= Broadland District Council elections =

Local government elections in Norfolk, England

Broadland District Council in Norfolk, England is elected every four years. Up until 2004 one third of the council was elected each year, followed by one year without election. Since the last boundary changes in 2004, 47 councillors have been elected from 27 wards.

== Council elections ==
- 1973 Broadland District Council election
- 1976 Broadland District Council election
- 1979 Broadland District Council election (New ward boundaries)
- 1980 Broadland District Council election
- 1982 Broadland District Council election
- 1983 Broadland District Council election
- 1984 Broadland District Council election
- 1986 Broadland District Council election
- 1987 Broadland District Council election
- 1988 Broadland District Council election
- 1990 Broadland District Council election
- 1991 Broadland District Council election
- 1992 Broadland District Council election
- 1994 Broadland District Council election
- 1995 Broadland District Council election
- 1996 Broadland District Council election
- 1998 Broadland District Council election
- 1999 Broadland District Council election
- 2000 Broadland District Council election
- 2002 Broadland District Council election
- 2003 Broadland District Council election
- 2004 Broadland District Council election (New ward boundaries reduced the number of seats by 2)
- 2007 Broadland District Council election
- 2011 Broadland District Council election
- 2015 Broadland District Council election
- 2019 Broadland District Council election
- 2023 Broadland District Council election

== Council composition ==
Year	Conservative	Liberal Democrats (Note: Includes totals for the predecessors of the Liberal Democrats, the Liberal Party and SDP (both of which participated in the Alliance).)	Labour	Green	Independents & Others	Council control after election
Local government reorganisation; council established (49 seats)
1973	21	0	6	–	22	No overall control
1976	33	2	1	0	13	Conservative
1979	40	0	0	0	9	Conservative
1980	37	0	3	0	9	Conservative
1982	38	1	1	0	9	Conservative
1983	37	3	1	0	8	Conservative
1984	39	4	0	0	6	Conservative
1986	34	9	0	0	6	Conservative
1987	33	10	0	0	6	Conservative
1988	35	7	0	0	7	Conservative
1990	31	6	5	0	7	Conservative
1991	26	8	7	0	8	Conservative
1992	27	8	6	0	8	Conservative
1994	21	16	6	0	6	No overall control
1995	18	14	13	0	4	No overall control
1996	12	12	20	0	5	No overall control
1998	21	8	16	0	4	No overall control
1999	25	9	12	0	3	Conservative
2000	32	9	7	0	1	Conservative
2002	26	10	6	0	7	Conservative
2003	27	12	2	0	8	Conservative
New ward boundaries (47 seats)
2004	31	11	0	0	5	Conservative
2007	35	9	0	0	3	Conservative
2011	34	12	1	0	0	Conservative
2015	43	4	0	0	0	Conservative
2019	33	12	2	0	0	Conservative
2023	21	14	8	4	0	No overall control

== Results maps ==
2004 results map

2007 results map

2011 results map

2015 results map

2019 results map

2023 results map

== By-election results ==
=== 1994-1998 ===
Hellesdon West By-Election 14 August 1997
Party	Candidate	Votes	%	±%
Conservative		370	38.9	+4.0
Labour		328	34.5	−4.5
Liberal Democrats		211	22.2	−2.2
Independent		41	4.3	+4.3
Majority		42	4.4	
Turnout		950	27.5	
Conservative gain from Labour		Swing		

Sprowston East By-Election 26 March 1998
Party	Candidate	Votes	%	±%
Conservative		364	36.7	
Labour		315	31.7	
Liberal Democrats		313	31.6	
Majority		49	5.0	
Turnout		992	27.2	
Conservative gain from Labour		Swing		

=== 1998-2002 ===
Great Witchingham By-Election 11 November 1999
Party	Candidate	Votes	%	±%
Conservative		245	43.9	+10.4
Labour		155	27.8	−9.2
Liberal Democrats		125	22.4	−0.7
Majority		90	16.1	
Turnout		525	34.0	
Conservative gain from Labour		Swing		

Cawston By-Election 14 December 2000
Party	Candidate	Votes	%	±%
Liberal Democrats	Veronica Beadle	211	38.7	+3.5
Conservative	Josef Large	196	36.0	+36.0
Labour	Terence Simons	138	25.3	+3.7
Majority		15	2.7	
Turnout		545	29.8	
Liberal Democrats gain from Independent		Swing		

=== 2004-2007 ===
Spixworth with St Faiths By-Election 12 January 2006
Party	Candidate	Votes	%	±%
Liberal Democrats	Balvinder Kular	902	65.8	+14.8
Conservative	Mark Fiddy	469	34.2	−14.8
Majority		433	31.6	
Turnout		1,371	31.4	
Liberal Democrats hold		Swing		

=== 2007-2011 ===
Buxton By-Election 5 March 2009
Party	Candidate	Votes	%	±%
Liberal Democrats	Barbara Rix	555	71.3	+50.4
Conservative	Ian Evans	201	25.8	−14.6
Green	Nick Ball	22	2.8	+2.8
Majority		354	45.5	
Turnout		778	40.0	
Liberal Democrats gain from Conservative		Swing		

Wroxham By-Election 1 October 2009
Party	Candidate	Votes	%	±%
Liberal Democrats	Ben McGilvray	960	62.5	+57.9
Conservative	Ian Evans	346	22.5	−9.5
UKIP	Glenn Tingle	134	8.7	+8.7
Green	Nick Ball	50	3.3	−2.8
Labour	Malcolm Kemp	46	3.0	+0.0
Majority		614	40.0	
Turnout		1,536	38.0	
Liberal Democrats gain from Independent		Swing		

Taverham North By-Election 18 March 2010
Party	Candidate	Votes	%	±%
Liberal Democrats	Nich Starling	630	54.5	+24.3
Conservative	John Griffin	471	40.8	−3.0
Green	Jennifer Parkhouse	54	4.7	+4.7
Majority		159	13.8	
Turnout		1,155	31.0	
Liberal Democrats gain from Conservative		Swing		

=== 2011-2015 ===
Blofield with South Walsham By-Election 2 May 2013
Party	Candidate	Votes	%	±%
Conservative	Susan Lawn	561	34.2	−6.2
Independent	George Debbage	522	31.8	+1.2
Independent	Stephen Heard	232	14.1	+14.1
Labour	Brenda Jones	222	13.5	−4.4
Liberal Democrats	Lauren Bean	105	6.4	−4.6
Majority		39	2.4	
Turnout		1,642		
Conservative hold		Swing		

Aylsham By-Election 2 May 2013
Party	Candidate	Votes	%	±%
Liberal Democrats	Steve Riley	688	50.2	+16.5
Conservative	Judi Meredith	501	36.6	−1.5
Labour	Malcolm Kemp	181	13.2	−2.3
Majority		187	13.6	
Turnout		1,370		
Liberal Democrats gain from Conservative		Swing		

Wroxham By-Election 20 March 2014
Party	Candidate	Votes	%	±%
Liberal Democrats	Alex Cassam	482	48.3	+2.5
Conservative	Fran Whymark	341	34.2	−0.3
UKIP	David Moreland	112	11.2	+11.2
Labour	Malcolm Kemp	63	6.3	−4.3
Majority		141	14.1	
Turnout		998		
Liberal Democrats hold		Swing		

Wroxham By-Election 21 August 2014
Party	Candidate	Votes	%	±%
Conservative	Fran Whymark	400	45.0	+10.5
Liberal Democrats	Malcolm Springall	386	43.4	−2.4
Labour	Malcolm Kemp	103	11.6	+1.0
Majority		14	1.6	
Turnout		889		
Conservative gain from Liberal Democrats		Swing		

=== 2015-2019 ===
Aylsham By-Election 17 March 2016
Party	Candidate	Votes	%	±%
Liberal Democrats	Steve Riley	829	48.0	+17.0
Conservative	Hal Turkmen	654	37.9	+5.6
Labour	Christopher Jenner	243	14.1	−7.9
Majority		175	10.1	
Turnout		1,726		
Liberal Democrats gain from Conservative		Swing		

Coltishall By-Election 8 June 2017
Party	Candidate	Votes	%	±%
Conservative	Jo Copplestone	780	49.5	−4.7
Labour	Stephen McNair	355	22.5	+1.0
Independent	Bob Grindrod	288	18.3	+18.3
Liberal Democrats	James Sparshatt	154	9.8	−1.6
Majority		425	26.9	
Turnout		1,577		
Conservative hold		Swing		

Aylsham By-Election 24 May 2018
Party	Candidate	Votes	%	±%
Liberal Democrats	Sue Catchpole	1,018	46.0	+15.0
Conservative	Hal Turkmen	865	39.1	+6.8
Labour	Peter Harwood	328	14.8	−7.2
Majority		153	6.9	
Turnout		2,211		
Liberal Democrats gain from Conservative		Swing		

=== 2019-2023 ===
Brundall By-Election 28 September 2021 (2 seats)
Party	Candidate	Votes	%	±%
Green	Jan Davis	594		
Green	Eleanor Laming	530		
Conservative	Tim Catmull	480		
Conservative	Michael Phelps	453		
Liberal Democrats	Eleanor Mason	425		
Liberal Democrats	Victor Scrivens	303		
Labour	Alice Free	161		
Labour	Glenn Springett	137		
Green gain from Conservative		Swing		
Green gain from Conservative		Swing		

Old Catton and Sprowston West By-Election 28 September 2021
Party	Candidate	Votes	%	±%
Conservative	Richard Potter	721	50.0	+3.5
Labour	Martin Booth	332	23.0	+4.8
Liberal Democrats	John Chettleburgh	278	19.3	−0.4
Green	Ian Chapman	110	7.6	−8.0
Majority		389	27.0	
Turnout		1,441		
Conservative hold		Swing		

Thorpe St Andrew North West By-Election 20 October 2022
Party	Candidate	Votes	%	±%
Labour	Calix Eden	860	51.8	+22.8
Conservative	Peter Berry	635	38.3	−17.8
Liberal Democrats	Brian Howe	165	9.9	−4.9
Majority		225	13.6	
Turnout		1,660		
Labour gain from Conservative		Swing		

=== 2023-2027 ===
Thorpe St Andrew North West By-Election 7 September 2023
Party	Candidate	Votes	%	±%
Conservative	Peter Berry	870	50.5	
Labour	Carol Ferris	757	43.9	
Liberal Democrats	Victor Morgan	96	5.6	
Majority		113	6.6	
Turnout		1,723		
Conservative gain from Labour		Swing		

Acle By-Election 15 May 2025
Party	Candidate	Votes	%	±%
Reform UK	Jimmi Lee	322	33.2	+33.2
Conservative	Vincent Tapp	208	21.4	−25.5
Green	Peter Carter	200	20.6	+20.6
Labour	Emma Covington	186	19.2	−23.1
Liberal Democrats	Philip Matthew	54	5.6	−5.2
Majority		114	11.8	
Turnout		970		
Reform UK gain from Conservative		Swing		
