= Christian Council of Britain =

British far-right organisation

- Formation: April 2006
- Type: British National Party-affiliated Christian lobby group

The Christian Council of Britain (CCoB) is an organisation founded by Robert West. While the CCoB claims to be "an independent, non-political organisation autonomous of any political party in Britain", it is closely associated with the British National Party, and West has been described as the BNP's religious affairs spokesman.

== Founder ==
The Times has stated that West is "an ordained elder" of the Apostolic Church; however, the church denies knowledge of him and has distanced itself from his views. In 2006 West, then a Conservative Party councillor on South Holland District Council in Lincolnshire, was suspended from the Party after Lincoln's Race Equality Council expressed concerns over his links with the BNP. BBC News subsequently reported that he had set up his own church, based in a house in Holbeach, to preach "traditional Bible beliefs". He later stood as a BNP candidate in the 2009 Norwich North by-election and in Lincoln during the General election of 2010, losing his deposit in both cases.

West also stood unsuccessfully during the 2009 European elections in the East Midlands region.

== Beliefs ==
The CCB claims that the Bible justifies its support for the BNP's repatriation policy, i.e. "firm but voluntary incentives for immigrants and their descendants to return home."

== Opposition ==
The Christian Council of Britain has been criticised by a number of mainline British Christian organisations. The ecumenical organisation Churches Together in Britain and Ireland disclaimed any connection to the CCoB. It endorsed a statement by the Methodist Church that "Christian belief is incompatible with any political party or philosophy that is based on hatred or treats people as inferior because of their race, beliefs or for any other reason" and rejecting the CCoB's theological views on the separation of races. The Church of England's General Synod passed a motion on 9 February 2004 condemning "any political movement that seeks to divide our communities on the basis of ethnicity" as "an affront to the nature of God revealed in creation and Scripture", and stating that "voting for and/or supporting a political party that offers racist policies is incompatible with Christian discipleship".

== See also ==
- Christian right
- Racism in the United Kingdom
