= East of England Regional Select Committee =

The East of England Regional Select Committee was one of nine regional select committees of the House of Commons in the Parliament of the United Kingdom. The establishment of the committee was agreed by the House of Commons on 12 November 2008, following the appointment of 'regional ministers' by Gordon Brown on his appointment as Prime Minister in June 2007. The committee came into existence on 1 January 2009 and ceased to exist upon the dissolution of Parliament on 12 April 2010.

The purpose of the committee was "to examine regional strategies and the work of regional bodies" in the East of England.

== Membership ==
The committee was first appointed on 3 March 2009 by the House of Commons, but only contained 5 Labour members as opposed to the 9 members from various parties as was agreed in the motion of 12 November 2008, due to the Conservatives and Liberal Democrats refusing to nominate any members as a sign of their opposition to the existence of regional committees.

Member	Party	Constituency
Margaret Moran MP (Chair)	Labour	Luton South
Charles Clarke MP	Labour	Norwich South
Dr. Ian Gibson MP	Labour	Norwich North
Patrick Hall MP	Labour	Bedford
Tony Wright MP	Labour	Great Yarmouth

Source: Parliament website
