= Robert West (politician) =

British activist (born 1955)

Member of South Holland District Council
- In office 1 May 2003 – 3 May 2007
- Constituency: Holbeach Town

Personal details
- Party: BNP (from 2006)
- Other political affiliations: Conservative (until 2006)

Robert Malcolm Brian West (born 11 October 1955) is a British National Party (BNP) activist and founder of the Christian Council of Britain.

== Theological training and claimed ordination ==
West is not an active minister of any mainstream Christian organisation, and his credentials remain ambiguous. Despite this, West has been described as the BNP's religious affairs spokesman.

West has stated that he is "an ordained elder" of the Apostolic Church; however, the church denies knowledge of him and has distanced itself from his views, saying that "the only means by which he can maintain either his membership or office [of the Apostolic Church] is by attending one of our churches. If he were an active member of the Church his views would not be accepted by the Church and disciplinary action would be undertaken by the Church which strongly distances itself from views such as these". At the website of the Apostolic Church, the third article under "Guidelines For Belief", makes it clear that only by regularly participating in the life of its church can one be considered a member, stating that "'luke warm' [sic] commitment is no good to God or to the Church".

In a BBC broadcast in April 2009, before the European election, West produced a framed certificate, which he claimed was evidence of his right to be considered an ordained minister. He said, "I attended the Apostolic Church training college, 1978 to 1979 in South Wales and I was in charge of one of their churches, which I ran, in effect, as a pastorate, for two years. And this has not been bought off the internet. It's a genuine article." On its website, the BNP says, "The Rev Robert West was ordained by the Vice President of the Apostolic Church in 1979 and in 2003 he entered politics to help bring the Christian message to all the peoples of Britain."

West now asserts himself to be a free and independent minister, sanctioned by the Christian Council of Britain, which he co-founded and which is closely connected to the BNP.

On the website for the Christian Council of Britain, a summary of the organisation's yearly report for 2010 cites a membership of "just over 45".

On the Church of England website a declaration dated 3 June 2014 states, "The House of Bishops of the Church of England have voted to make membership or support of the British National Party (BNP) or National Front (NF) a potential disciplinary offence for its clergy."

The Bishop of Lincoln, John Saxbee, has said, "The only church, as I understand it, which acknowledges him as a member is a church that he himself has founded and the only organisation which seems to endorse his views is an organisation which is a front organisation for the BNP. So I think we need to be very clear that Mr West, if he wants to promote his policies as being consistent with the Christian faith, is going to have to radically change his policies."

== Military and academic career ==
West is profiled on the BBC Norwich website as a former army officer and supply teacher, who holds a Bachelor of Science (BSc) degree in economics.

According to the website of the British National Party, "The Rev West became a Christian at the Royal Military Academy, Sandhurst, where he served under Lt General Sir Michael Willcocks RA, later Black Rod."

According to the Peterborough Today website, West taught law and history for about ten years at Peterborough Regional College, until he was made redundant as part of a staff shake-up in 2005. West "believed he was pushed out because of his religious beliefs and as a result of the school's equal opportunities policy, which, he claims, favours ethnic minority teachers". An article on the official website of the BNP, dated 15 July 2013, says West "... currently works in Peterborough, when not doing pastoral and preaching duties, as a supply teacher; being much appreciated for his class-handling skills amongst both primary and secondary children of all races and nationalities."

However, on 1 May 2015, following a hearing at the National College for Teaching and Leadership, a prohibition order was issued against West due to his derogatory remarks made towards Muslims - such as claiming he was "allergic to Mohammedans" and claiming "Muslims worship the Devil" during a lesson on the Crusades – thus preventing him from teaching. The order states "that Reverend Robert West is prohibited from teaching indefinitely and cannot teach in any school, sixth form college, relevant youth accommodation or children's home in England. He may apply for the prohibition order to be set aside, but not until 12 May 2018".

== Politics ==
West was formerly a councillor for the Holbeach Town ward of South Holland District Council in Lincolnshire. He was elected as a Conservative Party candidate but was suspended by the Conservatives after he spoke at a British National Party meeting in 2006. West subsequently defected to the BNP and stated that his switch was prompted by Conservative leader David Cameron's priority list of candidates for the next general election. He said the list "excluded white male candidates in favour of women, non-whites, homosexuals and lesbians". He stood again as a BNP candidate in 2007 but was defeated.

Before joining the BNP, West was a member of the Lincolnshire Racial Equality Council but he was suspended from the organisation.

In June 2009, West appeared alongside the BNP MEP Andrew Brons on the BBC's The Big Questions, and in 2014, he appeared in a BNP political broadcast. In this clip, West says, "The BNP is the only political party which will stop the Islamification of Britain, ban the burka and do its utmost to uphold your culture, heritage and identity."

He stood as a BNP candidate in the 2009 Norwich North by-election (finishing seventh of twelve, with 2.7% of the vote) and in Lincoln during the 2010 general election (finishing fourth of seven, with 3%), losing his deposit in both cases. West also stood unsuccessfully during the 2009 European elections in the East Midlands region.
