= Patrick Thompson =

British politician

Hugh Patrick Thompson (born 21 October 1935), known as Patrick Thompson, is a British Conservative Party politician.

== Early life ==
Educated at Felsted School and Emmanuel College, Cambridge, Thompson was a schoolmaster, teaching physics. From 1960 to 1965, he taught at the Manchester Grammar School and from 1965 to 1983 at Gresham's School, Holt.

== Parliamentary career ==
Thompson fought Bradford North in the February and October 1974 elections, being beaten by Labour's Ben Ford each time. In 1979 he was defeated at Barrow-in-Furness.

He was Member of Parliament for the marginal Norwich North seat, gaining it from Labour in 1983. He held the seat until his retirement in 1997.

Parliament of the United Kingdom
Preceded by David Ennals	Member of Parliament for Norwich North; 1983–1997	Succeeded by Ian Gibson
