= Chloe Smith =

British politician (born 1982)

The Right Honourable Chloe Smith
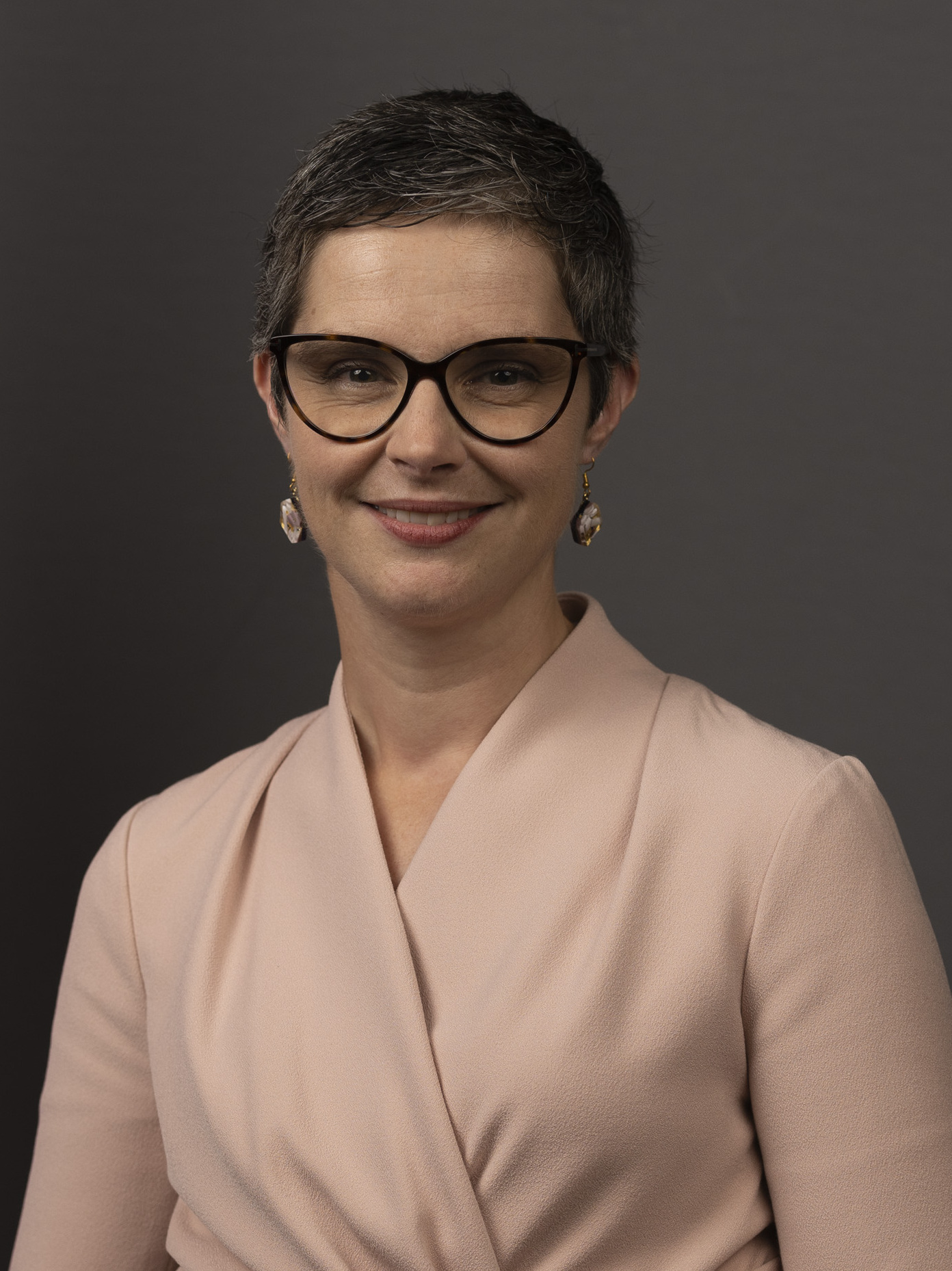
- Official portrait, 2022

Secretary of State for Science, Innovation and Technology
- In office 28 April 2023 – 20 July 2023 (Note: In accordance with the Ministerial and other Maternity Allowances Act 2021 Smith temporarily served in the position during the maternity leave of Donelan)
- Prime Minister: Rishi Sunak
- Preceded by: Michelle Donelan
- Succeeded by: Michelle Donelan

Secretary of State for Work and Pensions
- In office 6 September 2022 – 25 October 2022
- Prime Minister: Liz Truss
- Preceded by: Thérèse Coffey
- Succeeded by: Mel Stride
Junior ministerial offices
Minister of State for Disabled People, Work and Health
In office 16 September 2021 – 6 September 2022
Prime Minister	Boris Johnson
Preceded by	Justin Tomlinson
Succeeded by	Claire Coutinho
Minister of State for the Constitution and Devolution (Note: Parliamentary Secretary (2012–2013; 2018–2020))
In office 9 January 2018 – 16 September 2021
Prime Minister	Theresa May; Boris Johnson
Preceded by	Chris Skidmore
Succeeded by	Nigel Adams
In office 4 September 2012 – 6 October 2013
Prime Minister	David Cameron
Preceded by	Mark Harper
Succeeded by	Greg Clark
Parliamentary Under-Secretary of State for Northern Ireland
In office 14 June 2017 – 9 January 2018
Prime Minister	Theresa May
Preceded by	Kris Hopkins
Succeeded by	Shailesh Vara
Economic Secretary to the Treasury
In office 14 October 2011 – 4 September 2012
Prime Minister	David Cameron
Preceded by	Justine Greening
Succeeded by	Sajid Javid

Member of Parliament for Norwich North
- In office 23 July 2009 – 30 May 2024
- Preceded by: Ian Gibson
- Succeeded by: Alice Macdonald

Personal details
- Born: Chloe Rebecca Smith; 17 May 1982 (age 44) Ashford, Kent, England
- Party: Conservative
- Spouse: Sandy McFadzean (m. 2013)
- Children: 2
- Education: University of York
- Website: www.chloesmith.org.uk

Chloe Rebecca Smith (born 17 May 1982) is a British Conservative Party politician who served as the Member of Parliament (MP) for Norwich North from 2009 to 2024. She previously served as Secretary of State for Work and Pensions from September to October 2022 and Secretary of State for Science, Innovation and Technology from April to July 2023. (Note: In accordance with the Ministerial and other Maternity Allowances Act 2021 Smith temporarily served in the position during the maternity leave of Michelle Donelan)

Smith was elected in a 2009 by-election following the resignation of Labour MP Ian Gibson due to the MPs' expenses scandal. Smith held a number of junior ministerial roles under David Cameron and Theresa May, serving two terms as Parliamentary Secretary for the Constitution. She continued to serve in the latter role after Boris Johnson's victory in the 2019 Conservative Party leadership election.

In the February 2020 reshuffle, Smith was promoted to Minister of State during the second Johnson ministry. In the 2021 reshuffle, she was appointed by Johnson as Minister of State at the Department for Work and Pensions. After Johnson resigned in 2022, Smith supported Liz Truss’s bid to become Conservative leader. Following Truss's appointment as Prime Minister, she appointed Smith as Secretary of State for Work and Pensions. She was later temporarily Secretary of State for Science, Innovation and Technology during the time Michelle Donelan MP was Minister on Leave (Secretary of State), a position given to Secretaries of State and Ministers of State while on maternity leave.

== Early life ==
Chloe Smith was born in Ashford, Kent, in 1982. Her family moved to Stoke Ferry, Norfolk, when she was three years old, and she attended comprehensive schools in Swaffham and Methwold. After a gap year working for former Conservative Education Secretary Gillian Shephard, she read English Literature at the University of York. She undertook summer work for Bernard Jenkin.

After graduating from the University of York, Smith joined Deloitte Touche Tohmatsu as a management consultant. She advised private businesses, government departments and public bodies.

In 2007, Smith was chosen to be the Conservative Party candidate for the constituency of Norwich North at the general election. She then took leave from her job, working for Conservative Central Office on secondment, to "draw up detailed plans to put our policies into practice".

== Parliamentary career ==
Following the resignation of Labour MP Ian Gibson as a result of the MPs' expenses scandal, Smith became the Conservatives' by-election candidate. At the 2009 Norwich North by-election, Smith was elected, winning with 39.5% of the vote and a majority of 7,348. Smith became the youngest member of the House of Commons. She took her seat in the House of Commons when the parliamentary break ended in October.

At the 2010 general election, Smith was re-elected as MP for Norwich North with an increased vote share of 40.6% and a decreased majority of 3,901.

On 14 October 2011, she was appointed Economic Secretary to the Treasury in a ministerial reshuffle, becoming the youngest minister serving in government at that point. According to The Guardian newspaper Smith was appointed to the role because David Cameron wrongly understood her to be a trained accountant.

On 26 June 2012, she appeared on the BBC Two current affairs programme Newsnight and was interviewed about Chancellor George Osborne's decision that day to delay plans to increase fuel duty. Jeremy Paxman questioned the apparent change in her views on fuel duty. The interview attracted much comment, being described as a "mauling" and a "humiliation" of Smith. Politicians, including John Prescott and Nadine Dorries, questioned Osborne's judgement for sending a junior minister onto the programme in his place.

In September 2012, Smith was appointed Parliamentary Secretary at the Cabinet Office.

In August 2013, she was criticised for blocking identification of civil servants and public sector bodies responsible for £77m of flights booked through the Government Procurement Service. In October 2013, she resigned from the Cabinet Office to "concentrate on the most important part of my job: being the Member of Parliament for Norwich North".

In May 2014, she was awarded the Grassroot Diplomat Initiative Award under the Business Driver category for designing and conceiving the Norwich for Jobs campaign, which brought over 400 jobs and apprenticeships for young people in her constituency.

During the campaign for the 2015 general election, Smith was mocked by political opponents for quoting a constituent's letter in her election literature. The letter said she seemed "to act more like a Socialist than a Conservative". Smith responded: "Clearly I am not a socialist. I am a proud Conservative. What the letter writer was saying was my work can appeal across party lines".

At the 2015 general election, Smith was again re-elected, with an increased vote share of 43.7% and an increased majority of 4,463.

At the snap 2017 general election, Smith was again re-elected with an increased vote share of 47.7% and a decreased majority of 507. Following the election, she was appointed as Parliamentary Under Secretary of State for Northern Ireland working under James Brokenshire.

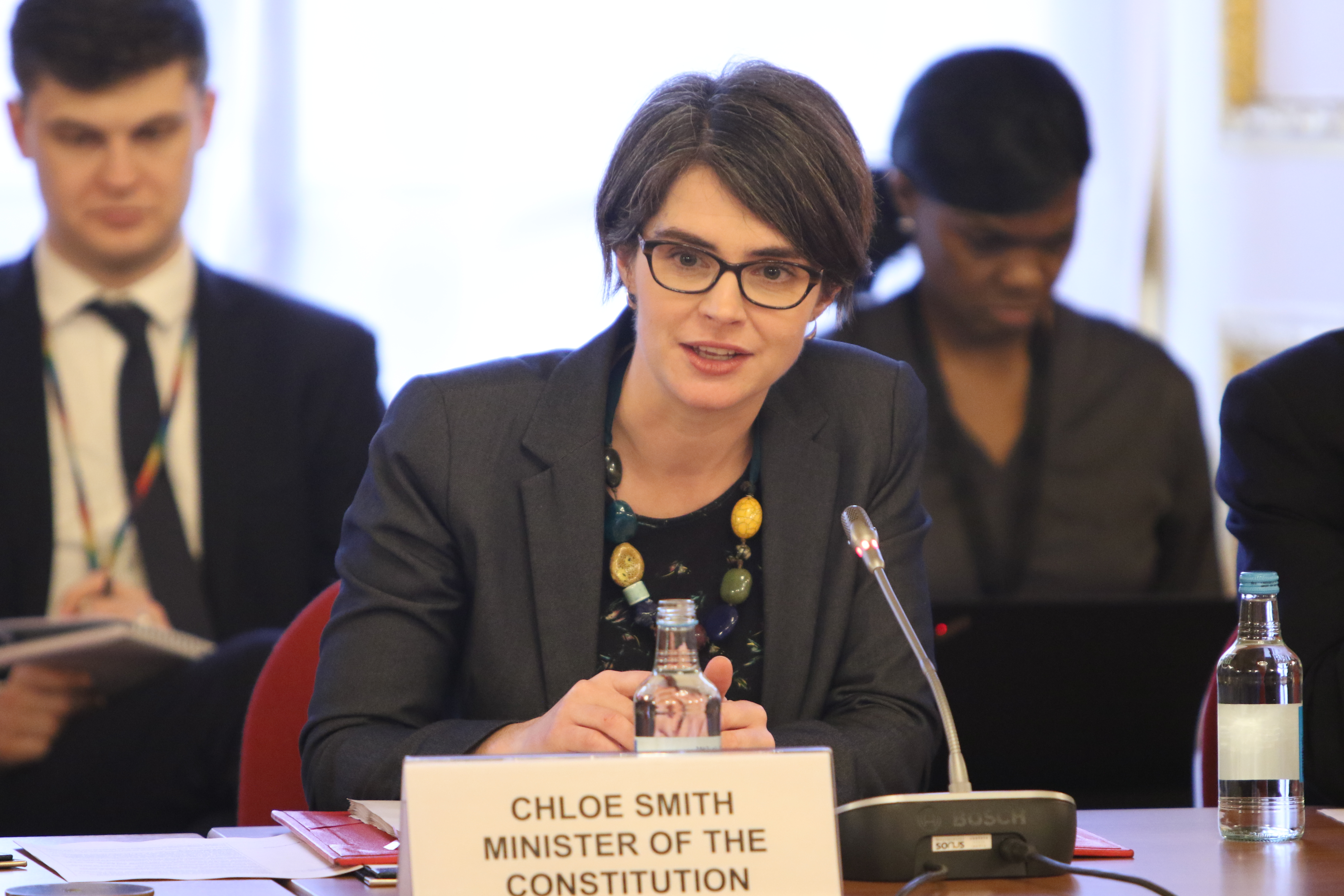
Smith in 2018

In January 2018, during the 2018 British cabinet reshuffle by Theresa May, Smith was appointed Parliamentary Secretary for the Constitution, a role she had previously held under David Cameron. In February 2020, Smith was promoted to Minister of State by Boris Johnson.

In August 2019, Smith was the victim of an anthrax scare in which she was sent a package of white powder.

At the 2019 general election, Smith was again re-elected, with an increased vote share of 50.5% and an increased majority of 4,738.

In September 2021, during the cabinet reshuffle, Smith became Minister of State for Disabled People, Work and Health at the Department for Work and Pensions.

On 6 September 2022, the then-Prime Minister Liz Truss appointed Smith as Secretary of State for Work and Pensions. She was sworn in as a member of the Privy Council on 13 September 2022 at Buckingham Palace following her appointment. entitling her to the honorific prefix "The Right Honourable" for Life.

On 25 October 2022, following the appointment of Rishi Sunak as Prime Minister, Smith returned to the backbenches.

On 22 November 2022 Smith announced that she would not stand for election to Parliament at the 2024 general election.

From 28 April 2023 to 19 July 2023, Smith was the temporary Secretary of State for Science, Innovation and Technology during Michelle Donelan's maternity leave in accordance with the Ministerial and other Maternity Allowances Act 2021.

== Political positions ==
Smith's political stances have included support for lower taxation, increasing VAT, and opposition to the Lisbon Treaty. She also supported the legalisation of same-sex marriage. She singles out Benjamin Disraeli as a political leader she admires.

Smith was opposed to Brexit before the 2016 referendum. She endorsed Boris Johnson during the 2019 Conservative Party leadership election.

== Career after politics ==
After leaving Parliament in May 2024, Smith returned to the private sector, supporting start-ups and larger organisations on innovation, technology and business strategy. She also became a trustee of the deafness charity RNID and the cancer charity Big C.

In January 2025, Smith was elected president of the Chartered Institute of Personnel and Development (CIPD), the professional body for human resources and people development, taking up the role in March. As president, she has focused on the relationship between people and technology, the responsible adoption of artificial intelligence in the workplace, workforce transformation, inclusive employment and skills. The role is unpaid and part-time.

In September 2026, Smith was appointed an adviser to LaunchLemonade, a UK artificial intelligence company founded by Cien Solon. She advises the company's founders on strategy and partnerships, with a particular focus on regulated industries, AI governance, workforce adoption and issues affecting small and medium-sized businesses.

== Personal life ==
Smith is an active volunteer and fundraiser for several charities including Cancer Research UK and Sport Relief. She is an atheist.

In 2013, Smith married financial consultant Sandy McFadzean. They had their first child, a son, in 2016. In 2019, their second child, a daughter, was born.

In November 2020, Smith announced that she had been diagnosed with breast cancer. In June 2021, she announced that after chemotherapy and surgery, she was cancer-free.

== Notes ==
Parliament of the United Kingdom
Preceded by Ian Gibson	Member of Parliament for Norwich North; 2009–2024	Succeeded by Alice Macdonald
Preceded by Jo Swinson	Baby of the House; 2009–2010	Succeeded by Pamela Nash
Political offices
Preceded by Justine Greening	Economic Secretary to the Treasury; 2011–2012	Succeeded by Sajid Javid
Preceded by Kris Hopkins	Parliamentary Under-Secretary of State for Northern Ireland; 2017–2018	Succeeded by Shailesh Vara
Preceded by Mark Harper	Parliamentary Secretary for the Cabinet Office; 2012–2013	Succeeded by Greg Clark
Preceded by Chris Skidmore	Parliamentary Secretary for the Cabinet Office; 2018–2020	Position abolished
Position established	Minister of State for the Constitution and Devolution; 2020–2021	Succeeded by Nigel Adams as Minister of State without Portfolio
Preceded by Justin Tomlinson	Minister of State for Disabled People, Work and Health; 2021–2022	Succeeded by Claire Coutinho
Preceded by Thérèse Coffey	Secretary of State for Work and Pensions; 2022	Succeeded by Mel Stride
