= Norwich North =

Parliamentary constituency in the United Kingdom, 1950 onwards

Coordinates: 52.65°N 1.30°E

- Borough constituency for the House of Commons
- Interactive map of boundaries since 2024
- Location within the East of England
- County: Norfolk
- Electorate: 71,441 (March 2020)

Current constituency
- Created: 1950
- Member of Parliament: Alice Macdonald (Labour)
- Seats: One
- Created from: Norwich

Norwich North is a constituency (Note: A borough constituency (for the purposes of election expenses and type of returning officer)) in the House of Commons of the UK Parliament represented by Alice Macdonald, member of the Labour Party, after winning the seat in the 2024 general election.

The constituency includes parts of two local government areas, Norwich and Broadland with the majority of the electorate in Broadland.

== Constituency profile ==
Norwich North is a constituency in Norfolk in the East of England. It covers the northern, suburban neighbourhoods of Norwich, most of which lie within the Broadland district outside the city's official boundaries. Areas within this constituency include Thorpe St Andrew, Old Catton, Sprowston, Hellesdon and Drayton.

Norwich is a historic city and was England's second-largest settlement after London until the industrial era. It is known for its medieval architecture and its traditional association with literature and the shoemaking industry. The suburbs that make up this constituency are historic settlements in their own right but have largely been absorbed into Norwich's wider urban area by Victorian and 20th-century development. Norwich North generally has average levels of wealth; there are high levels of deprivation in the Mile Cross and Heartsease council estates whilst the outer suburbs are more affluent. House prices across the constituency are lower than the regional and UK averages.

Residents of Norwich North have a similar age profile to the country as a whole. Household income is below-average whilst the child poverty and homeownership rates are in line with UK-wide figures. Residents have low levels of education and a low proportion work in professional occupations. The percentage claiming unemployment benefits is similar to the UK average. White people made up 93% of the population at the 2021 Census.

At the district council level, the neighbourhoods close to the city centre are represented mostly by Green Party councillors, Sprowston and the council estates by the Labour Party and the outer, wealthier suburbs by Conservatives. At the county council, which held elections in 2026, most of the constituency is represented by Reform UK. An estimated 56% of voters in Norwich North supported leaving the European Union in the 2016 referendum, higher than the UK-wide figure of 52%.

== History ==
The constituency was created by the Representation of the People Act 1948 for the 1950 general election, when the former two-seat constituency of Norwich was divided into two single-member seats, Norwich North and Norwich South.

It was initially a safe seat for the Labour Party, held continuously by the party until 1983, when major boundary changes made the seat much more favourable to the Conservatives, who then held the seat from 1983 to 1997. The Labour member from 1997 to 2009 was Ian Gibson, who resigned as an MP with immediate effect on 5 June 2009 after being implicated in the expenses scandal. A by-election was held to replace him on 23 July 2009, which was won by the Conservative Chloe Smith. She retained the seat in the 2010, 2015, 2017 and 2019 general elections, achieving over 50% of the vote for the first time in 2019. In 2022, Smith announced she would stand down from Parliament at the dissolution in advance of the 2024 general election, when the seat was regained by Labour's Alice McDonald.

== Boundaries and boundary changes ==
=== Historic ===
==== 1950–1951 ====
- The County Borough of Norwich wards of Catton, Coslany, Fye Bridge, Heigham, Hellesdon, Mousehold, Thorpe, and Westwick.

==== 1951–1974 ====
- The County Borough of Norwich wards of Catton, Coslany, Fye Bridge, Heigham, Hellesdon, Mousehold, Thorpe, and Westwick; and
- The part of the civil parish of Thorpe-next-Norwich in the Rural District of Blofield and Flegg, and the part of the parish of Sprowston in the Rural District of St Faiths and Aylsham, added to the County Borough of Norwich by the Norwich Extension Act 1950.

Minor expansion of boundaries under the provisions of Statutory Instrument 1951/325.

==== 1974–1983 ====
- The County Borough of Norwich wards of Catton, Coslany, Crome, Heigham, Hellesdon, Mancroft, Mousehold, and Thorpe.

Further to the Second Periodic Review of Westminster Constituencies a redistribution of seats was enacted in 1970. However, in the case of the two Norwich constituencies, this was superseded before the February 1974 general election by the Parliamentary Constituencies (Norwich) Order 1973 which followed on from a revision of the County Borough of Norwich wards in 1971, resulting in a realignment of the boundary with Norwich South.

==== 1983–1997 ====
- The District of Broadland wards of Catton, Hellesdon North, Hellesdon South East, Hellesdon West, Sprowston Central, Sprowston East, Sprowston South, Sprowston West, Thorpe St Andrew North East, Thorpe St Andrew North West, and Thorpe St Andrew South; and
- The City of Norwich wards of Catton Grove, Coslany, Crome, Mile Cross, and Mousehold.

Gained suburban areas now part of the District of Broadland, including Thorpe St Andrew from Yarmouth and Hellesdon and Sprowston from North Norfolk. Southern areas transferred to Norwich South.

==== 1997–2010 ====
- The District of Broadland wards of Catton, Drayton, Hellesdon North, Hellesdon South East, Hellesdon West, Sprowston Central, Sprowston East, Sprowston South, Sprowston West, Taverham, Thorpe St Andrew North East, Thorpe St Andrew North West, and Thorpe St Andrew South; and
- The City of Norwich wards of Catton Grove, Coslany, Crome, Mile Cross, and Mousehold.

District of Broadland wards of Drayton and Taverham transferred from Mid Norfolk.

==== 2010–2024 ====
Map of boundaries 2010-2024

- The District of Broadland wards of Hellesdon North West, Hellesdon South East, Old Catton and Sprowston West, Sprowston Central, Sprowston East, Thorpe St Andrew North West, and Thorpe St Andrew South East; and
- The City of Norwich wards of Catton Grove, Crome, Mile Cross, and Sewell.

Drayton and Taverham were transferred back out, to the new constituency of Broadland. In Norwich, the part of the Crome ward around Morse Road moved to Norwich North, while the area around Mousehold Street in Thorpe Hamlet became part of Norwich South.

Following their review of parliamentary constituencies in Norfolk that concluded in 2007 and came into effect for the 2010 general election, the Boundary Commission for England created a slightly modified Norwich North constituency. The changes were necessary to re-align the constituency boundaries with the new local government ward boundaries introduced in Broadland and Norwich and to take account of Norfolk being awarded an additional, ninth constituency by the Boundary Commission.

=== Current ===
Further to the 2023 review of Westminster constituencies, which came into effect for the 2024 general election, the constituency comprises the following (as they existed on 1 December 2020):

- The District of Broadland wards of Drayton North, Drayton South, Hellesdon North West, Hellesdon South East, Old Catton and Sprowston West, Sprowston Central, Sprowston East, Thorpe St Andrew North West, and Thorpe St Andrew South East; and
- The City of Norwich wards of Catton Grove, Crome, Mile Cross, and Sewell.

The seat was expanded slightly to regain Drayton (but not Taverham) from Broadland and the area around Mousehold Street from Norwich South.

== Members of Parliament ==
Norwich prior to 1950

Election	Member	Party
1950	John Paton	Labour
1964	George Wallace	Labour
February 1974	David Ennals	Labour
1983	Patrick Thompson	Conservative
1997	Ian Gibson	Labour
2009 by-election	Chloe Smith	Conservative
2024	Alice Macdonald	Labour Co-op

== Elections ==
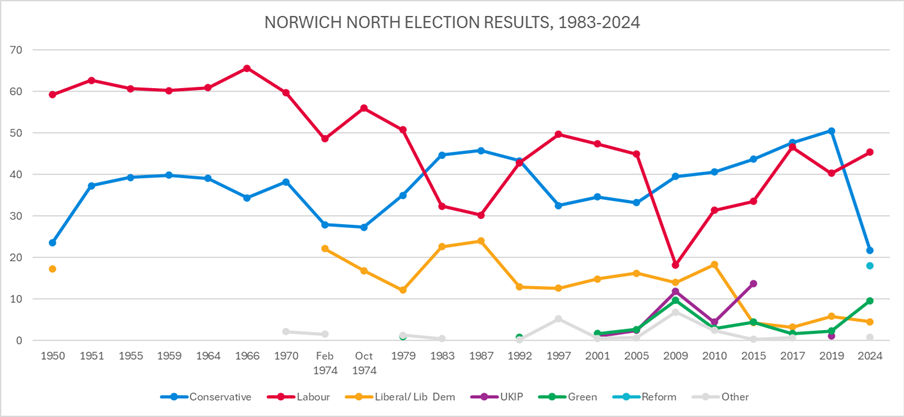
Election results 1950-2024

=== Elections in the 2020s ===
General election 2024: Norwich North
Party	Candidate	Votes	%	±%
Labour Co-op	Alice Macdonald	20,794	45.4	+6.5
Conservative	Charlotte Salomon	9,944	21.7	−29.9
Reform	Nick Taylor	8,229	18.0	N/A
Green	Ben Price	4,372	9.6	+7.3
Liberal Democrats	Chika Akinwale	2,073	4.5	−1.7
Independent	Fiona Grace	353	0.8	N/A
Majority		10,850	23.7	
Turnout		45,765	62.1	
Labour gain from Conservative		Swing	+18.2	

=== Elections in the 2010s ===
General election 2019: Norwich North
Party	Candidate	Votes	%	±%
Conservative	Chloe Smith	23,397	50.5	+2.8
Labour	Karen Davis	18,659	40.3	−6.3
Liberal Democrats	David Thomas	2,663	5.8	+2.6
Green	Adrian Holmes	1,078	2.3	+0.6
UKIP	David Moreland	488	1.1	N/A
Majority		4,738	10.2	+9.1
Turnout		46,285	68.9	+0.2
Conservative hold		Swing	+4.6	

General election 2017: Norwich North
Party	Candidate	Votes	%	±%
Conservative	Chloe Smith	21,900	47.7	+4.0
Labour	Christopher Jones	21,393	46.6	+13.1
Liberal Democrats	Hugh Lanham	1,480	3.2	−1.1
Green	Adrian Holmes	782	1.7	−2.7
Pirate	Liam Matthews	340	0.7	N/A
Majority		507	1.1	−9.1
Turnout		45,977	68.7	+1.8
Conservative hold		Swing	-4.6	

General election 2015: Norwich North
Party	Candidate	Votes	%	±%
Conservative	Chloe Smith	19,052	43.7	+3.1
Labour	Jessica Asato	14,589	33.5	+2.1
UKIP	Glenn Tingle	5,986	13.7	+9.3
Green	Adrian Holmes	1,939	4.4	+1.5
Liberal Democrats	James Wright	1,894	4.3	−14.0
Independent	Mick Hardy	132	0.3	N/A
Majority		4,463	10.2	+1.0
Turnout		43,592	66.9	+1.7
Conservative hold		Swing	+0.6	

General election 2010: Norwich North
Party	Candidate	Votes	%	±%
Conservative	Chloe Smith	17,280	40.6	+10.1
Labour Co-op	John Cook	13,379	31.4	+15.7
Liberal Democrats	David Stephen	7,783	18.3	+2.2
UKIP	Glenn Tingle	1,878	4.4	+2.1
Green	Jess Goldfinch	1,245	2.9	−0.3
BNP	Thomas Richardson	747	1.8	N/A
Independent	Bill Holden	143	0.3	N/A
Christian	Andrew Holland	118	0.3	N/A
Majority		3,901	9.2	N/A
Turnout		42,573	65.2	+4.1
Conservative hold		Swing	+12.9	

=== Elections in the 2000s ===
By-election 2009: Norwich North
Party	Candidate	Votes	%	±%
Conservative	Chloe Smith	13,591	39.5	+6.3
Labour	Chris Ostrowski	6,243	18.2	−26.7
Liberal Democrats	April Pond	4,803	14.0	−2.2
UKIP	Glenn Tingle	4,068	11.8	+9.4
Green	Rupert Read	3,350	9.7	+7.0
Put an Honest Man into Parliament	Craig Murray	953	2.8	N/A
BNP	Robert West	941	2.7	N/A
Independent	Bill Holden	166	0.5	−0.2
Monster Raving Loony	Alan Hope	144	0.4	N/A
NOTA	Anne Fryatt	59	0.2	N/A
Libertarian	Thomas Burridge	36	0.1	N/A
Independent	Peter Baggs	23	0.1	N/A
Majority		7,348	21.3	N/A
Turnout		34,377	45.9	−15.2
Conservative gain from Labour		Swing	+16.5	

General election 2005: Norwich North
Party	Candidate	Votes	%	±%
Labour	Ian Gibson	21,097	44.9	−2.5
Conservative	James Tumbridge	15,638	33.2	−1.4
Liberal Democrats	Robin Whitmore	7,616	16.2	+1.4
Green	Adrian Holmes	1,252	2.7	+1.0
UKIP	John Youles	1,122	2.4	+1.4
Independent	Bill Holden	308	0.7	N/A
Majority		5,459	11.7	−1.1
Turnout		47,033	61.1	+2.0
Labour hold		Swing	−0.6	

General election 2001: Norwich North
Party	Candidate	Votes	%	±%
Labour	Ian Gibson	21,624	47.4	−2.3
Conservative	Kay Mason	15,761	34.6	+2.1
Liberal Democrats	Moira Toye	6,750	14.8	+2.2
Green	Rob Tinch	797	1.7	N/A
UKIP	Guy Cheyney	471	1.0	N/A
Independent	Michael Betts	211	0.5	N/A
Majority		5,863	12.8	−5.4
Turnout		45,614	59.1	−16.8
Labour hold		Swing	−2.2	

=== Elections in the 1990s ===
General election 1997: Norwich North
Party	Candidate	Votes	%	±%
Labour	Ian Gibson	27,346	49.7	+6.9
Conservative	Robert Kinghorn	17,876	32.5	−10.8
Liberal Democrats	Paul Young	6,951	12.6	−0.3
Referendum	Tony Bailey-Smith	1,777	3.2	N/A
Legalise Cannabis	Howard Marks	512	0.9	N/A
Socialist Labour	James Hood	495	0.9	N/A
Natural Law	Diana Mills	100	0.2	0.0
Majority		9,470	17.2	N/A
Turnout		55,057	75.9	−5.9
Labour gain from Conservative		Swing	+8.8	

General election 1992: Norwich North
Party	Candidate	Votes	%	±%
Conservative	Patrick Thompson	22,419	43.3	−2.5
Labour	Ian Gibson	22,153	42.8	+12.6
Liberal Democrats	David Harrison	6,706	12.9	−11.1
Green	Lou Betts	433	0.8	N/A
Natural Law	R. Arnold	93	0.2	N/A
Majority		266	0.5	−15.1
Turnout		51,804	81.8	+2.6
Conservative hold		Swing	−7.6	

=== Elections in the 1980s ===
General election 1987: Norwich North
Party	Candidate	Votes	%	±%
Conservative	Patrick Thompson	22,772	45.8	+1.1
Labour	Mary Honeyball	14,996	30.2	−2.2
Liberal	Paul Nicholls	11,922	24.0	+1.4
Majority		7,776	15.6	+3.3
Turnout		49,690	79.2	+3.0
Conservative hold		Swing	+1.7	

General election 1983: Norwich North
Party	Candidate	Votes	%	±%
Conservative	Patrick Thompson	21,355	44.7	
Labour	David Ennals	15,476	32.4	
Liberal	Graham Jones	10,796	22.6	
Workers Revolutionary	F. Cairns	194	0.4	
Majority		5,879	12.3	
Turnout		47,821	76.2	
Conservative gain from Labour		Swing		

Note: This constituency underwent boundary changes after the 1979 election, so was notionally a Conservative-held seat.

=== Elections in the 1970s ===
General election 1979: Norwich North
Party	Candidate	Votes	%	±%
Labour	David Ennals	17,927	50.8	−5.2
Conservative	P. H. Rippon	12,336	35.0	+7.7
Liberal	P. Moore	4,253	12.1	−4.7
Ecology	G. Hannah	334	1.0	N/A
National Front	L. Goold	250	0.7	N/A
Communist	A. Panes	106	0.3	N/A
Workers Revolutionary	S. Colling	92	0.3	N/A
Majority		5,591	15.8	−12.9
Turnout		33,298	75.6	+4.4
Labour hold		Swing	-6.5	

General election October 1974: Norwich North
Party	Candidate	Votes	%	±%
Labour	David Ennals	17,958	56.0	+7.4
Conservative	T. P. Doe	8,754	27.3	−0.6
Liberal	E. M. Wheeler	5,378	16.8	−5.3
Majority		9,204	28.7	+8.0
Turnout		32,090	71.2	−7.7
Labour hold		Swing	+4.0	

General election February 1974: Norwich North
Party	Candidate	Votes	%	±%
Labour	David Ennals	17,111	48.6	−10.1
Conservative	T. P. Doe	9,817	27.9	−10.3
Liberal	E. M. Wheeler	7,773	22.1	N/A
National Front	G. Goold	544	1.5	N/A
Majority		7,294	20.7	−0.8
Turnout		35,245	78.9	+7.6
Labour hold		Swing	+0.1	

General election 1970: Norwich North
Party	Candidate	Votes	%	±%
Labour	George Wallace	18,564	59.7	−5.9
Conservative	Amédée Turner	11,868	38.2	+3.8
Independent Progressive	C. C. Fairhead	658	2.1	N/A
Majority		6,696	21.5	−9.7
Turnout		31,090	71.3	−2.9
Labour hold		Swing	−4.9	

=== Elections in the 1960s ===
General election 1966: Norwich North
Party	Candidate	Votes	%	±%
Labour	George Wallace	18,777	65.6	+4.7
Conservative	Amédée Turner	9,851	34.4	−4.7
Majority		8,926	31.2	+9.4
Turnout		28,628	74.2	−0.3
Labour hold		Swing	+4.7	

General election 1964: Norwich North
Party	Candidate	Votes	%	±%
Labour	George Wallace	18,111	60.9	+0.7
Conservative	Amédée Turner	11,620	39.1	−0.7
Majority		6,491	21.8	+1.4
Turnout		29,731	74.5	−2.4
Labour hold		Swing	+0.7	

=== Elections in the 1950s ===
General election 1959: Norwich North
Party	Candidate	Votes	%	±%
Labour	John Paton	19,092	60.2	−0.5
Conservative	Dudley R Chance	12,609	39.8	+0.5
Majority		6,483	20.4	−1.0
Turnout		31,701	76.9	+1.6
Labour hold		Swing	−0.5	

General election 1955: Norwich North
Party	Candidate	Votes	%	±%
Labour	John Paton	18,682	60.7	−2.0
Conservative	Thomas Eaton	12,087	39.3	+2.0
Majority		6,595	21.4	−4.0
Turnout		30,769	75.3	−8.8
Labour hold		Swing	−2.0	

General election 1951: Norwich North
Party	Candidate	Votes	%	±%
Labour	John Paton	22,880	62.7	+3.5
Conservative	Thomas Eaton	13,587	37.3	+13.8
Majority		9,293	25.4	−10.3
Turnout		36,467	84.1	−2.1
Labour hold		Swing	−5.2	

General election 1950: Norwich North
Party	Candidate	Votes	%
Labour	John Paton	21,898	59.2
Conservative	V. R. Rees	8,704	23.5
Liberal	Don Bennett	6,376	17.2
Majority		13,194	35.7
Turnout		36,978	86.2
Labour win (new seat)			

== See also ==
- 2009 Norwich North by-election
- List of parliamentary constituencies in Norfolk
- List of parliamentary constituencies in the East of England (region)
