= David Ennals, Baron Ennals =

British politician and activist

The Right Honourable The Lord Ennals PC
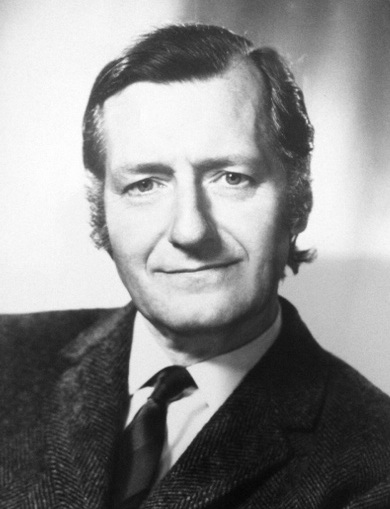

Shadow Secretary of State for Social Services
- In office 4 May 1979 – 14 June 1979
- Leader: James Callaghan
- Preceded by: Patrick Jenkin
- Succeeded by: Stanley Orme

Secretary of State for Social Services
- In office 8 April 1976 – 4 May 1979
- Prime Minister: James Callaghan
- Preceded by: Barbara Castle
- Succeeded by: Patrick Jenkin

Minister of State for Foreign and Commonwealth Affairs
- In office 7 March 1974 – 8 April 1976
- Prime Minister: Harold Wilson
- Succeeded by: Ted Rowlands

Member of Parliament for Norwich North
- In office 28 February 1974 – 13 May 1983
- Preceded by: George Wallace
- Succeeded by: Patrick Thompson

Member of Parliament for Dover
- In office 15 October 1964 – 29 May 1970
- Preceded by: John Arbuthnot
- Succeeded by: Peter Rees

Personal details
- Born: 19 August 1922 Walsall, Staffordshire, England
- Died: 17 June 1995 (aged 72) Belsize Park, London, England
- Party: Labour
- Other political affiliations: Liberal (early 1950s)
- Spouse(s): Eleanor Maud Caddick (m. 1950; div. 1977) Gene Tranoy (m. 1977)

David Hedley Ennals, Baron Ennals, PC (19 August 1922 – 17 June 1995) was a British Labour Party politician and campaigner for human rights. He served as Secretary of State for Social Services from 1976 to 1979.

== Early life and military career ==
Born in 1922 in Walsall, Staffordshire to Arthur Ford Ennals and his wife Jessie Edith Taylor, Ennals was educated at Queen Mary's Grammar School, Walsall and the Loomis Institute in Windsor, Connecticut on a one-year student exchange scholarship. In 1939 he was a reporter on the Walsall Observer.

In Wolverhampton on his nineteenth birthday, 19 August 1941, he enlisted in the Royal Army Service Corps (RASC) and joined 9th Training Battalion (Drivers) at Alfreton. Selected for officer training, he was posted to 162 Officer Cadet Training Unit at Lanark in March 1942.

He was commissioned into the Reconnaissance Corps in September 1942 and posted to the 3rd Regiment Reconnaissance Corps (NF) (3 Recce), part of the 3rd Infantry Division. His service number was 245228. Landing in Normandy on D-Day, 6 June 1944, Lieutenant Ennals commanded a Contact Detachment providing wireless links between units. On the night of 28/29 June 1944 he went on a night patrol with 1st Battalion Royal Norfolk Regiment who were holding the position to the right of 3 Recce to the north of Caen. The patrol was fired on and returned less Lt Ennals. He was reported as believed to be a prisoner of war. At the beginning of August 1944 Rennes Military Hospital was liberated by US troops. Amongst the patients was Lt Ennals, having been admitted on 3 July with at fracture of his right humerus. He was transferred to a UK hospital on the 14 August and classed as unfit for duty until he was invalided out with the rank of Lieutenant in 1947.

== Political career ==
Ennals stood unsuccessfully as a Liberal candidate for Richmond (Surrey) in the 1950 general election and again in 1951. He later joined the Labour Party and served as secretary to the international department at the Labour Party's head office.

In 1964 he was elected as the Member of Parliament for Dover. Following the 1966 election, Harold Wilson appointed Ennals as Parliamentary Under-Secretary of State for the Army. He moved to become Parliamentary Under-Secretary of State for the Home Department in 1967 under James Callaghan before being appointed as a Minister of State in the Department of Health and Social Security in 1968. He lost his government post and his seat following Labour's defeat in the 1970 general election. However, in Wilson's Resignation Honours, he was sworn of the Privy Council.

Ennals returned to parliament representing Norwich North following the February 1974 general election and was appointed Minister of State for Foreign and Commonwealth Affairs. In 1976 he became Secretary of State for Social Services, which he held until Labour lost power in 1979. During his tenure he appointed Sir Douglas Black to produce the Black Report (published in 1980) into health inequality. After losing his seat in the general election of 1983, he was created a life peer, as Baron Ennals, of Norwich in the County of Norfolk.

== Other work ==
Following his exit from parliament in 1970, Ennals became Campaign Director for the National Association for Mental Health (MIND), which he served as until 1973. He became chairman in 1984, and served as president from 1989 to 1995.

Ennals was Secretary of the Council for Education in World Citizenship (CEWC) 1947 - 1952, before leaving to serve as secretary to the United Nations Association from 1952 to 1957, he became chairman in 1984, as well as Chairman of the Gandhi Foundation, which he held until 1995. Ennals also served as Chairman of the Anti-Apartheid Movement, from 1960 to 1964, a position that would also be held by his brother John from 1968 to 1976. However, he later came under criticism from the Movement for his involvement in passing the Commonwealth Immigrants Act 1968.

In 1987 Lord Ennals went on a parliamentary fact-finding mission to Tibet and on his return to the UK he became a tireless campaigner for Tibetan independence and a friend of the 14th Dalai Lama. He joined the Tibet Society of the UK, the first Tibet support group in the world, established in 1959, and became its chairman for a number of years. He campaigned energetically and enthusiastically with it and various other UK and international Tibet support groups until his death in 1995.

== Personal life ==
Ennals married Eleanor Maud Caddick (born 1924/1925) on 10 June 1950, and they had four children before they divorced in 1977. Later that year he married Katherine Gene Tranoy (born 1926/1927).

Ennals had an older brother, John and a younger brother Martin Ennals, who was a human rights activist and Secretary-General of Amnesty International. His son, Sir Paul Ennals, is chief executive of the National Children's Bureau.

He died in 1995 of pancreatic cancer at his home in Belsize Park, London.

== Footnotes ==
Parliament of the United Kingdom
Preceded by John Arbuthnot	Member of Parliament for Dover; 1964–1970	Succeeded by Peter Rees
Preceded by George Wallace	Member of Parliament for Norwich North; 1974–1983	Succeeded by Patrick Thompson
Political offices
Preceded by Barbara Castle	Secretary of State for Social Services; 1976–1979	Succeeded by Patrick Jenkin
Party political offices
Preceded by Peter Ericsson	Secretary of the International Department of the Labour Party; 1958–1965	Succeeded by Gwyn Morgan
