= 2019 Broadland District Council election =

2019 UK local government election

- 2 May 2019

All 47 seats to Broadland District Council 24 seats needed for a majority

	First party	Second party	Third party
Party	Conservative	Liberal Democrats	Labour
Last election	43 seats, 49.7%	4 seats, 19.1%	0 seats, 18.9%
Seats won	33	12	2
Seat change	▼10	▲8	▲2
Popular vote	28,121	16,904	12,592
Percentage	45.9%	27.6%	20.6%
Swing	▼3.8%	▲8.5%	▲1.7%
- Winner of each seat at the 2019 Broadland District Council election
Council control before election
Conservative
Council control after election
Conservative

The 2019 Broadland District Council election took place on 2 May 2019 to elect members of the Broadland District Council in England. They were held on the same day as other local elections.

== Summary ==
=== Election result ===
2019 Broadland District Council election
Party	Seats	Gains	Losses	Net gain/loss	Seats %	Votes %	Votes	+/−
Conservative	33	0	10	▼10	70.2	45.9	28,121	–3.8
Liberal Democrats	12	8	0	▲8	25.5	27.6	16,904	+8.5
Labour	2	2	0	▲2	4.3	20.6	12,592	+1.7
Green	0	0	0	Steady	0.0	4.4	2,713	+3.5
Independent	0	0	0	Steady	0.0	0.9	562	+0.2
UKIP	0	0	0	Steady	0.0	0.5	323	–10.3

== Ward results ==
=== Acle ===
Acle
Party	Candidate	Votes	%	±%
Conservative	Lana Hampsall	422	53.1	−1.6
Labour	Tony Hemmingway	243	30.6	+7.5
Liberal Democrats	James Barker	130	16.4	N/A
Turnout		795	35.4	
Conservative hold		Swing		

=== Aylsham ===
Aylsham
Party	Candidate	Votes	%	±%
Liberal Democrats	Sue Catchpole	1,479	61.8	
Liberal Democrats	David Harrison	1,409	58.9	
Liberal Democrats	Steve Riley	1,126	47.1	
Conservative	Jonathan Wilton	738	30.9	
Independent	Lloyd Mills	422	17.6	
Labour	Peter Harwood	260	10.9	
Labour	Philip Williams	232	9.7	
Turnout		2,392	35.6	
Liberal Democrats gain from Conservative				
Liberal Democrats hold				
Liberal Democrats gain from Conservative				

=== Blofield with South Walsham ===
Blofield with South Walsham
Party	Candidate	Votes	%	±%
Conservative	Nigel Brennan	788	51.6	
Conservative	Justine Thomas	747	48.9	
Liberal Democrats	Malcolm Prior	463	30.3	
Labour	Claire Lees	391	25.6	
Labour	Glenn Springett	283	18.5	
Turnout		1,528	32.1	
Conservative hold				
Conservative hold				

==== Brundall ====
Brundall
Party	Candidate	Votes	%	±%
Conservative	Michael Snowling	814	45.8	
Conservative	Rebecca Grattan	720	40.5	
Labour	Alice Free	441	24.8	
Green	Jan Davis	427	24.0	
Labour	Marianne Gibbs	385	21.7	
Liberal Democrats	Eleanor Mason	304	17.1	
Green	Caroline Fernandez	295	16.6	
Turnout		1,777	36.9	
Conservative hold				
Conservative hold				

=== Burlingham ===
Burlingham
Party	Candidate	Votes	%	±%
Conservative	Clare Ryman-Tubb	213	33.8	−12.8
Independent	Glenn Tingle	140	22.2	N/A
Labour	Christopher Jones	118	18.7	−7.3
Green	Lynn Smithdale	81	12.8	N/A
Liberal Democrats	Deanne Thomas	79	12.5	+2.9
Turnout		631	29.8	
Conservative hold		Swing		

=== Buxton ===
Buxton
Party	Candidate	Votes	%	±%
Liberal Democrats	Karen Lawrence	305	45.4	+11.7
Conservative	Tim Catmull	303	45.1	+13.6
Labour	Stephen McNair	64	9.5	−0.5
Turnout		672	33.1	
Liberal Democrats hold		Swing		

=== Coltishall ===
Coltishall
Party	Candidate	Votes	%	±%
Conservative	Jo Copplestone	374	56.3	+2.1
Labour	Campbell Jones	163	24.4	+2.9
Liberal Democrats	Sarah Crane	128	19.3	+7.9
Turnout		665	31.9	
Conservative hold		Swing		

=== Drayton North ===
Drayton North
Party	Candidate	Votes	%	±%
Conservative	Adrian Crotch	301	56.8	+7.2
Liberal Democrats	Ian Leach	265	43.2	+13.3
Turnout		613	27.8	
Conservative hold		Swing		

=== Drayton South ===
Drayton South
Party	Candidate	Votes	%	±%
Conservative	Roger Foulger	403	58.9	+2.1
Liberal Democrats	Fran Cawdron	165	24.1	−0.4
Labour	Christine Hemmingway	116	17.0	N/A
Turnout		684	34.6	
Conservative hold		Swing		

=== Eynesford ===
Eynesford
Party	Candidate	Votes	%	±%
Conservative	Greg Peck	374	47.1	+5.9
Liberal Democrats	Dota Williams	296	37.3	−0.8
Labour	Jo Emmerson	124	15.6	N/A
Turnout		794	31.8	
Conservative hold		Swing		

=== Great Witchingham ===
Great Witchingham
Party	Candidate	Votes	%	±%
Conservative	Peter Bulman	317	45.7	−4.7
Labour	Ruth Goodall	219	31.6	+5.7
Liberal Democrats	Cameron Phillips	157	22.7	−1.0
Turnout		693	32.8	
Conservative hold		Swing		

=== Hellesdon North ===
Hellesdon North
Party	Candidate	Votes	%	±%
Conservative	Shelagh Gurney	688	53.8	
Conservative	David King	536	41.9	
Labour	Bibin Baby	324	25.3	
Liberal Democrats	Peter Balcombe	245	19.2	
Labour	Antony Crush	239	18.7	
Green	Kenneth Parsons	186	14.5	
Liberal Democrats	Jean Markwell	126	9.9	
Turnout		1,279	28.1	
Conservative hold				
Conservative hold				

=== Hellesdon South East ===
Hellesdon South East
Party	Candidate	Votes	%	±%
Conservative	Sue Prutton	474	39.5	
Liberal Democrats	David Britcher	437	36.4	
Conservative	Bill Johnson	412	34.3	
Liberal Democrats	Victor Scrivens	255	21.2	
Labour	Ian Duckett	248	20.6	
Labour	Annie Thompson	216	18.0	
Green	Gil Murray	161	13.4	
Turnout		1,201	29.0	
Conservative hold				
Liberal Democrats gain from Conservative				

=== Hevingham ===
Hevingham
Party	Candidate	Votes	%	±%
Liberal Democrats	Julie Neesam	382	52.3	+29.8
Conservative	Paul Carrick	271	37.1	−14.6
Labour	David Heywood	78	10.7	N/A
Turnout		731	32.5	
Liberal Democrats gain from Conservative		Swing		

=== Horsford and Felthorpe ===
Horsford and Felthorpe
Party	Candidate	Votes	%	±%
Liberal Democrats	Lisa Starling	799	67.1	
Liberal Democrats	Dave Thomas	657	55.2	
Conservative	Joanne Keeler	297	24.9	
Conservative	David Willmott	290	24.3	
Labour	Sebastian Loxton	115	9.7	
Turnout		1,191	29.9	
Liberal Democrats gain from Conservative				
Liberal Democrats gain from Conservative				

=== Marshes ===
Marshes
Party	Candidate	Votes	%	±%
Conservative	Grant Nurden	426	53.8	+6.1
Labour	Julie Williams	186	23.5	+1.5
Liberal Democrats	Allison Barker	180	22.7	+11.8
Turnout		792	32.6	
Conservative hold		Swing		

=== Old Catton and Sprowston West ===
Old Catton and Sprowston West
Party	Candidate	Votes	%	±%
Conservative	Karen Vincent	1,024	49.7	
Conservative	Ken Leggett	985	47.8	
Conservative	Samuel Walker	962	46.7	
Liberal Democrats	Bob Fowkes	433	21.0	
Liberal Democrats	Martin Callam	425	20.6	
Labour	Jan Hooks	401	19.5	
Labour	Sarah Taylor	398	19.3	
Labour	Barrie Osborne	351	17.0	
Green	Kahn Johnson	344	16.7	
Liberal Democrats	Thomas Maxwell	236	11.5	
Turnout		2,061	31.2	
Conservative hold				
Conservative hold				
Conservative hold				

=== Plumstead ===
Plumstead
Party	Candidate	Votes	%	±%
Conservative	Shaun Vincent	435	51.3	+0.5
Green	Andrew Cawdron	413	48.7	+27.6
Turnout		848	33.4	
Conservative hold		Swing		

=== Reepham ===
Reepham
Party	Candidate	Votes	%	±%
Liberal Democrats	Stuart Beadle	386	42.8	+2.9
Conservative	Graham Everett	305	33.9	−11.5
Green	Sarah Morgan	155	17.2	N/A
Labour	Jonathan Rackham	55	6.1	N/A
Turnout		901	42.7	
Liberal Democrats gain from Conservative		Swing		

=== Spixworth with St. Faiths ===
Spixworth with St. Faiths
Party	Candidate	Votes	%	±%
Liberal Democrats	Dan Roper	849	64.1	
Liberal Democrats	Susan Holland	679	51.3	
Conservative	Lawrence Hill	335	25.3	
Conservative	Stuart Dunn	333	25.2	
Labour	Bill Couzens	126	9.5	
Labour	Brenda Jones	109	8.2	
Turnout		1,324	30.1	
Liberal Democrats hold				
Liberal Democrats hold				

=== Sprowston Central ===
Sprowston Central
Party	Candidate	Votes	%	±%
Labour	Breanne Cook	713	48.1	
Labour	Natasha Harpley	615	41.5	
Conservative	Robin Knowles	552	37.3	
Conservative	Peter Berry	487	32.9	
UKIP	John Gilson	189	12.8	
Liberal Democrats	Bali Kular	134	9.0	
Turnout		1,481	35.0	
Labour gain from Conservative				
Labour gain from Conservative				

=== Sprowston East ===
Sprowston East
Party	Candidate	Votes	%	±%
Conservative	Ian Moncur	1,131	56.3	
Conservative	Judy Leggett	996	49.6	
Conservative	John Ward	943	47.0	
Labour	Chrissie Rumsby	567	28.2	
Labour	Harvey Tarlton	497	24.8	
Labour	Alan Pawsey	459	22.9	
Liberal Democrats	Sam Sirdar	364	18.1	
Liberal Democrats	Audrey Elliott	271	13.5	
Liberal Democrats	Jane Wright	260	12.9	
Turnout		2,008	30.5	
Conservative hold				
Conservative hold				
Conservative hold				

=== Taverham North ===
Taverham North
Party	Candidate	Votes	%	±%
Conservative	Tony Adams	469	43.9	
Liberal Democrats	Caroline Karimi-Ghovanlou	405	37.9	
Conservative	Richard Gill	375	35.1	
Liberal Democrats	Veronica Beadle	328	30.7	
Labour	Louise Baldry	230	21.5	
Labour	Trevor Turk	192	18.0	
Turnout		1,068	27.3	
Conservative hold				
Liberal Democrats gain from Conservative				

=== Taverham South ===
Taverham South
Party	Candidate	Votes	%	±%
Conservative	Stuart Clancy	851	67.4	
Conservative	Ken Kelly	658	52.1	
Liberal Democrats	Shirley Clayton	207	16.4	
Liberal Democrats	Malcolm Clayton	191	15.1	
Labour	Neil Brummage	181	14.3	
Labour	Mo Steel	161	12.8	
Turnout		1,262	35.2	
Conservative hold				
Conservative hold				

=== Thorpe St Andrew North West ===
Thorpe St Andrew North West
Party	Candidate	Votes	%	±%
Conservative	John Fisher	1,184	55.5	
Conservative	Ian Mackie	1,068	50.1	
Conservative	Nigel Shaw	1,042	48.9	
Labour	Sue Wright	612	28.7	
Labour	Anne Roderick	601	28.2	
Labour	Alan Wright	601	28.2	
Liberal Democrats	Brian Howe	313	14.7	
Liberal Democrats	Jon Goodwin	309	14.5	
Liberal Democrats	Amy Jenkins	302	14.2	
Turnout		2,132	36.0	
Conservative hold				
Conservative hold				
Conservative hold				

=== Thorpe St Andrew South East ===
Thorpe St Andrew South East
Party	Candidate	Votes	%	±%
Conservative	Jonathan Emsell	1,019	54.7	
Conservative	Susan Lawn	1,008	54.1	
Conservative	Trudy Mancini-Boyle	873	46.9	
Labour	Terry Phillips	380	20.4	
Labour	Nick Williams	360	19.3	
Labour	Gary Tibbitts	358	19.2	
Green	Spencer Groombridge	297	15.9	
Liberal Democrats	Phyllida Scrivens	293	15.7	
Green	Kate Rhind	285	15.3	
Liberal Democrats	Malcolm Martins	282	15.1	
Liberal Democrats	Grant Turner	242	13.0	
Turnout		1,863	34.3	
Conservative hold				
Conservative hold				
Conservative hold				

=== Wroxham ===
Wroxham
Party	Candidate	Votes	%	±%
Conservative	Fran Whymark	585	46.3	
Conservative	Martin Murrell	546	43.2	
Liberal Democrats	Stephen Heard	327	25.9	
Liberal Democrats	Linda Aspland	281	22.2	
Green	Nick Ball	160	12.7	
UKIP	Craig Dimbleby	134	10.6	
Labour	Malcolm Kemp	101	8.0	
Green	Delyth Crook	95	7.5	
Labour	Julia Wheeler	79	6.3	
Turnout		1,264	30.2	
Conservative hold				
Conservative hold				

== Changes 2019–2023 ==
=== Brundall ===
Brundall: 28 September 2021
Party	Candidate	Votes	%	±%
Green	Jan Davis	594	37.7	+13.7
Green	Eleanor Laming	530	33.6	+17.0
Conservative	Tim Catmull	480	30.4	−15.4
Conservative	Michael Phelps	453	28.7	−11.8
Liberal Democrats	Eleanor Mason	425	26.9	+9.8
Liberal Democrats	Victor Scrivens	303	19.2	N/A
Labour	Alice Free	161	10.2	−14.6
Labour	Glenn Springett	137	8.7	−13.0
Turnout		1,579	32.2	−4.7
Green gain from Conservative				
Green gain from Conservative				

The Brundall by-election followed the resignations of Conservative councillors Rebecca Grattan and Michael Snowling.

==== Old Catton & Sprowston West ====
Old Catton & Sprowston West: 28 September 2021
Party	Candidate	Votes	%	±%
Conservative	Richard Potter	721	50.0	+3.3
Labour	Martin Booth	332	23.0	+3.5
Liberal Democrats	John Chettleburgh	278	19.3	−1.7
Green	Ian Chapman	110	7.6	−9.1
Majority		389	27.0	
Turnout		1,449	21.9	−9.3
Conservative hold		Swing		

==== Thorpe St Andrew North West ====
Thorpe St Andrew North West: 20 October 2022
Party	Candidate	Votes	%	±%
Labour	Calix Eden	860	51.8	+22.8
Conservative	Peter Berry	635	38.3	−17.9
Liberal Democrats	Brian Howe	165	9.9	−4.9
Majority		225	13.5	
Turnout		1,660	27.9	
Labour gain from Conservative		Swing	▲20.4	

The Thorpe St Andrew North West by-election followed the death of Conservative councillor Nigel Shaw.
