= Alice Macdonald =

British Labour politician

Alice Macdonald MP
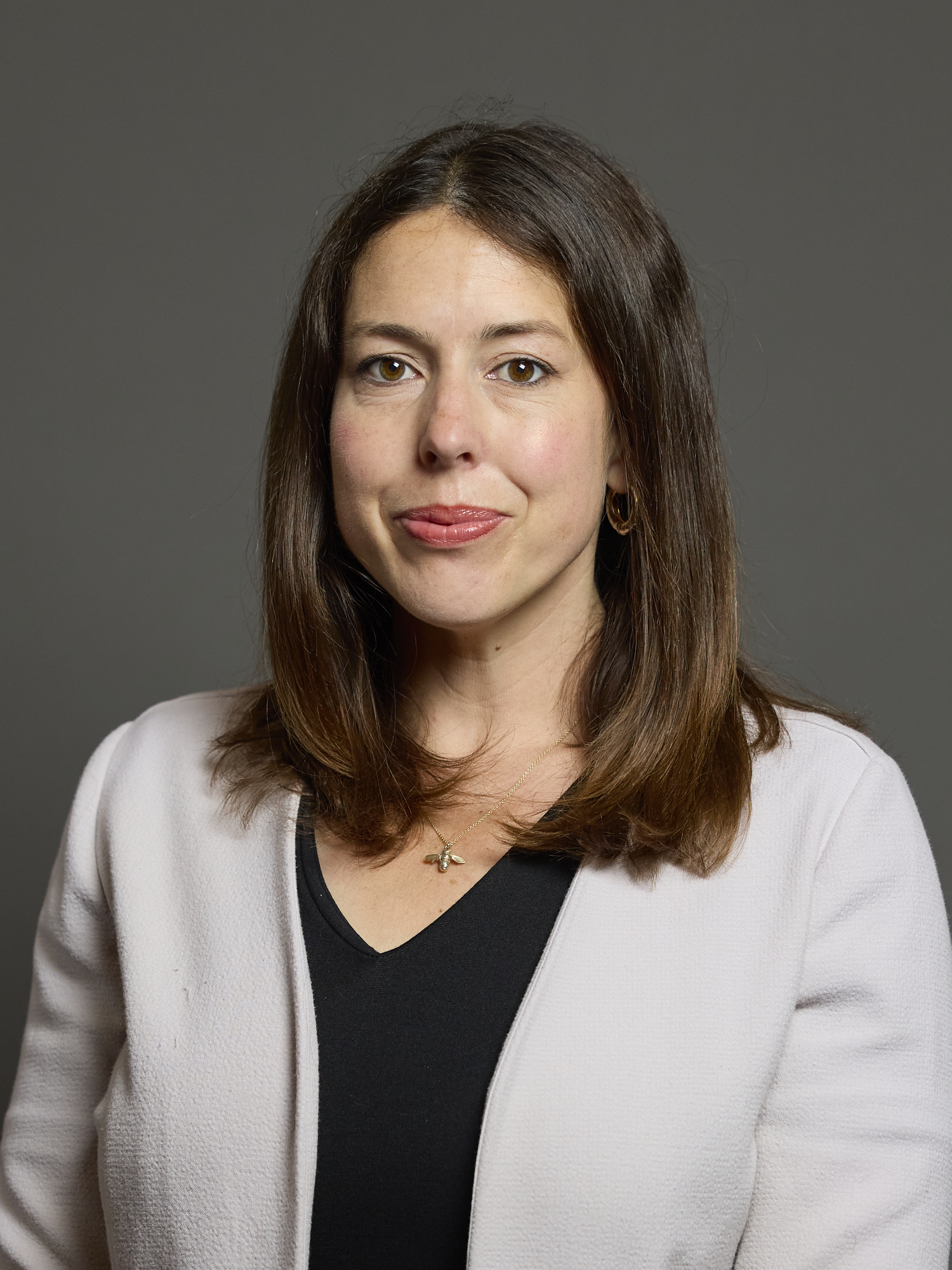
- Official portrait, 2024

Member of Parliament for Norwich North
- Incumbent
- Assumed office 4 July 2024
- Preceded by: Chloe Smith
- Majority: 10,850 (23.7%)

Member of Southwark London Borough Council for Newington
- In office 7 May 2018 – 29 June 2023

Personal details
- Born: 1 April 1983 (age 43) Norwich, Norfolk, England
- Party: Labour and Co-operative
- Parent(s): Irene and John Macdonald
- Education: University of Bristol (Bachelor of Arts: French and Italian); SOAS, University of London (Master of Arts: International Studies and Diplomacy)

Alice Macdonald (born 1 April 1983) is a British Labour and Co-operative Party politician serving as the Member of Parliament (MP) for Norwich North since 2024.

== Early life and education ==
Macdonald is the daughter of former West Norfolk Council Labour leader Irene Macdonald. She grew up in Marham and attended the Downham Market comprehensive high school, then commuted to a sixth form in Cambridge. She studied French and Italian at the University of Bristol in 2005, then went on to study a Master of the Arts in International Studies and Diplomacy at SOAS University of London, where she graduated in 2007.

== Pre-Parliamentary career ==
=== Local politics ===
Macdonald served as a councillor in the Newington ward of Southwark from 7 May 2018 to 29 June 2023. On 25 July 2022 she was announced as the official Labour parliamentary candidate for Norwich North. She has also served as a senior adviser to Harriet Harman and Bob Ainsworth.

=== Charity campaigning ===
Macdonald was Campaigns and Policy Director for London-based company Project Everyone between August 2016 and April 2023. Project Everyone was co-founded by Richard Curtis and is dedicated to "achieving sustainable development goals" via "campaign materials, [...] installations, [...] documentaries, [and] events". Macdonald also served as Campaign Director for Hungry for Action Campaign, who aim to spotlight the global food crisis, but resigned from this position upon becoming MP.

=== Appointments ===
Macdonald was a Director of the Potter Fields Park Management Trust, a not-for-profit organisation that manages events and maintenance for a park and a churchyard in Southwark. The appointment lasted from 21 July 2021 until 28 November 2022, when she resigned from her position.

== Parliamentary career ==
In 2022, Macdonald announced she would be standing for the Labour parliamentary candidacy against Karen Davis, who stood in the 2019 general election against Conservative incumbent Chloe Smith. In response to a video by Macdonald supporting her own candidacy, Emma Corlett, the deputy leader of Norfolk County Council, remarked: "This video literally uses photos from Karen Davis' campaign on holiday hunger and has you walking past the Vote Labour boards she and I put up with our bare (splintered) hands."

Macdonald was elected to represent Norwich North at the 2024 general election. She received 20,794 votes, a 45.4% share of the vote and a majority of 10,850. There were six candidates and a turnout of 62%.

Shortly after being elected, MacDonald stood to be the Chair of International Development Committee, but lost to Sarah Champion, who has served in that position since January 2020.

Parliament of the United Kingdom
| Preceded by Chloe Smith | Member of Parliament for Norwich North; 2024–present | Incumbent |
