= Rupert Read =

British philosopher (born 1966)

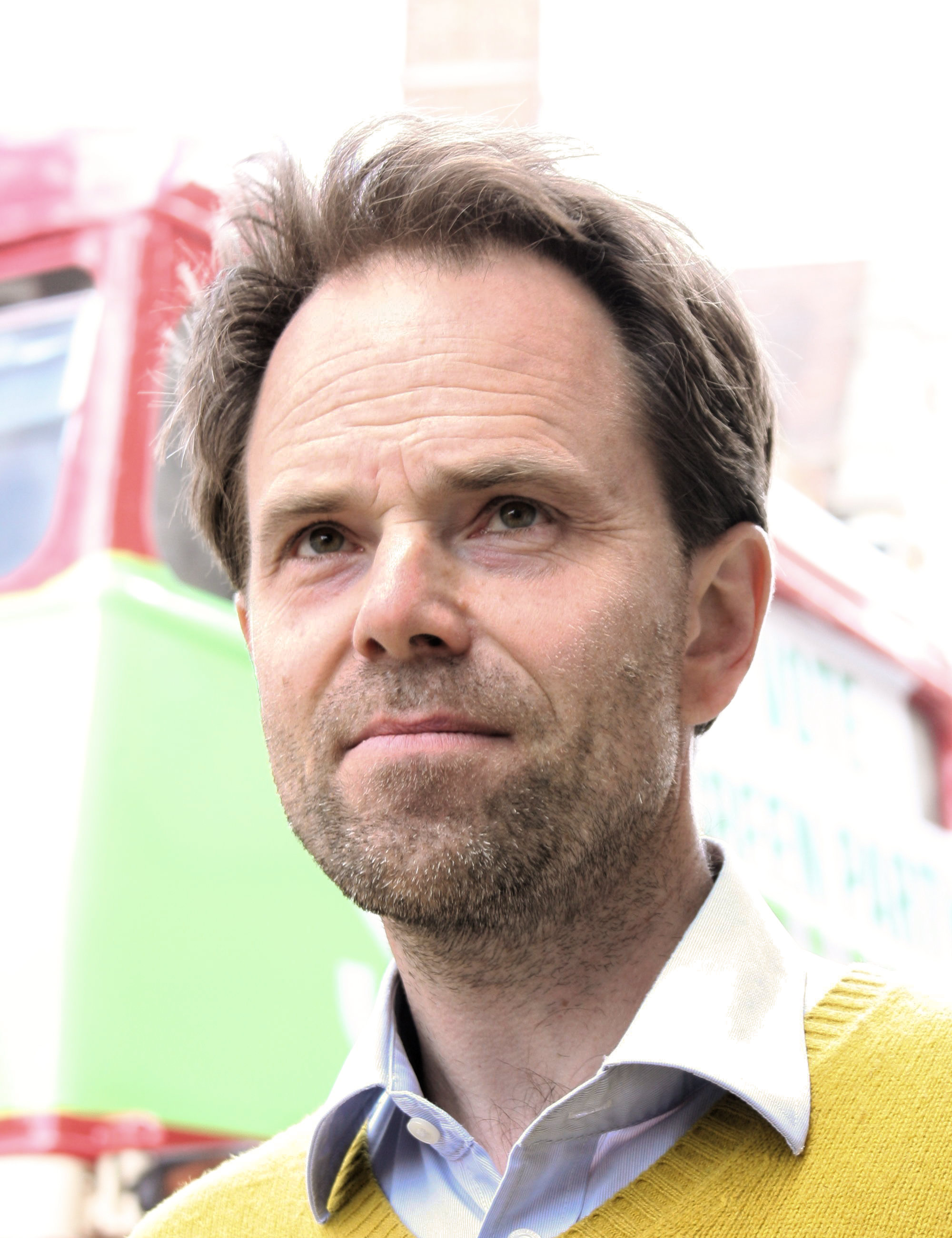
- Rupert Read campaigning in Cambridge during the general election of 2015.

Norwich City Councillor for Wensum Ward
- In office 10 June 2004 – 5 May 2011
- Preceded by: (new seat)
- Succeeded by: Lucy Galvin

Personal details
- Born: 1966 (age 59–60)
- Party: Green Party of England and Wales
- Education: Balliol College, Oxford

Rupert Read (born 1966) is an environmental philosopher, public intellectual, and the founder and current director of the Climate Majority Project. He is the author of several books on Wittgenstein, philosophy, and/or climate change, most recently Why Climate Breakdown Matters, Deep Adaptation: Navigating the Realities of Climate Chaos, and Do You Want to Know the Truth? Until 2023, Read was a reader in philosophy at the University of East Anglia where he was awarded – as Principal Investigator – Arts and Humanities Research Council (AHRC) funding for two projects on "natural capital". His other major recent academic focus has been on the precautionary principle, having contributed substantially to work co-authored with Nassim Nicholas Taleb on applying the principle to questions of genetic modification of organisms. In further work, Read has theorised the utility of the precautionary principle in a wide range of areas, including: climate change, the environment, as well as financial and technology sectors. He previously worked as a spokesperson for Extinction Rebellion.

Read's application of the precautionary principle in climate and environmental affairs underlies many of his talks and presentations, notably including "Shed a Light – This civilisation is finished: so what is to be done?" which was given at Churchill College, Cambridge and has gained success on YouTube with over 200,000 views.

In June 2018, Read triggered a BBC policy shift by publicly refusing to debate with a climate change denier. This led to new policy that meant the BBC would no longer present climate change deniers' views as a counterbalance to scientific standpoints.

In October 2018, Read declared his support for Extinction Rebellion. Acting as Extinction Rebellion's spokesperson, he gave a number of interviews on national news programmes during the Rebellion's London protests in April 2019 (see below). Read was part of the five members of the group invited to meet with Environment Secretary Michael Gove to discuss their demands. The following day the UK Parliament declared a "climate change emergency"; part of Extinction Rebellion's demands.

Read commented regularly through the Eastern Daily Press "One World Column" for five years. In his regular appearances in the local and national press, he speaks on sustainable transport, green economics, and social justice. He was formerly chair of the Green House thinktank, a former Green Party spokesperson for transport and former East of England party co-ordinator.

Read left UEA in the Summer of 2023, citing his dissatisfaction with current academia's failure to adequately confront the climate crisis, as well as its tendency to over-appreciate the sciences and under-appreciate the arts and humanities, coupled with the opportunity for Read to spend his time building the Climate Majority Project which he believes is a more vital use of his time.

Read's current focus is on Transformative Adaptation, a form of climate change adaptation that focuses on transforming society from the bottom-up to improve resilience against climate breakdown. As he argues, the majority of national and international effort around the climate crisis is spent on decarbonisation, but this implies that the climate crisis can be avoided if we decarbonise enough. This approach made sense a few decades ago, but now there is a certain level of climate breakdown that is inevitable. Whilst decarbonisation is still important in reducing the severity of climatic breakdown, to best prepare for the unfolding climate crisis, Read argues that we must adapt our communities to become more resilient against environmental collapse. Read co-wrote Transformative Adaptation: Another world is still just possible with Manda Scott and Morgan Phillips.

== Academic career ==
Rupert Read

Philosophical work
- Era: Contemporary philosophy
- Region: Western Philosophy
- School: Analytic philosophy
- Main interests: Philosophy of literature, Philosophy and film, Ludwig Wittgenstein, Philosophy of science

Read studied Philosophy, politics and economics (PPE) at Balliol College, Oxford, before undertaking postgraduate studies in the United States at Princeton University and Rutgers University (where he gained his doctorate). Influenced by Ludwig Wittgenstein's philosophy, his PhD involved "a Wittgensteinian exploration of the relationship between Kripke's 'quus' problem and Nelson Goodman's 'grue' problem."

He is a reader at the University of East Anglia, specialising in philosophy of language, philosophy of science, and environmental philosophy, previously having taught at Manchester. He has authored many books, including: Kuhn (2002), Applying Wittgenstein (2007), Philosophy for Life (2007), There is No Such Thing as a Social Science (2008), Wittgenstein Among the Sciences (2012), A Wittgensteinian Way with Paradoxes (2012), and A Film-Philosophy of Ecology and Enlightenment (2018). He has two chapters titled "Making the Best of Climate Disasters" and "Geoengineering as a Response to the Climate Crisis" in the Green House think-tank book: Facing up to Climate Reality (2019). His book 'This Civilisation Is Finished, co-authored by Samuel Alexander was published on 1 June 2019.

His editorial experience includes The New Hume Debate (co-edited, 2000), Film as Philosophy: Essays on Cinema after Wittgenstein and Cavell (2005), and the work for which he is perhaps best known, The New Wittgenstein (2000), which offers a major re-evaluation of Wittgenstein's thinking. He has also co-created other books including Debating Nature’s Value (2018).

Read was one of five contributors, including Nassim Nicholas Taleb, to a paper entitled "The Precautionary principle (with Application to the Genetic Modification of Organisms)"; this paper has been downloaded approximately a quarter of a million times.

Read has been awarded – as principal investigator – AHRC funding for two projects on "natural capital". The first in 2016 titled "Debating Nature's Value" has completed with a book being published of the same name (see above). Read then lead on the follow-up project titled "Taking the debate on nature's value to the valuers".

== Political career ==
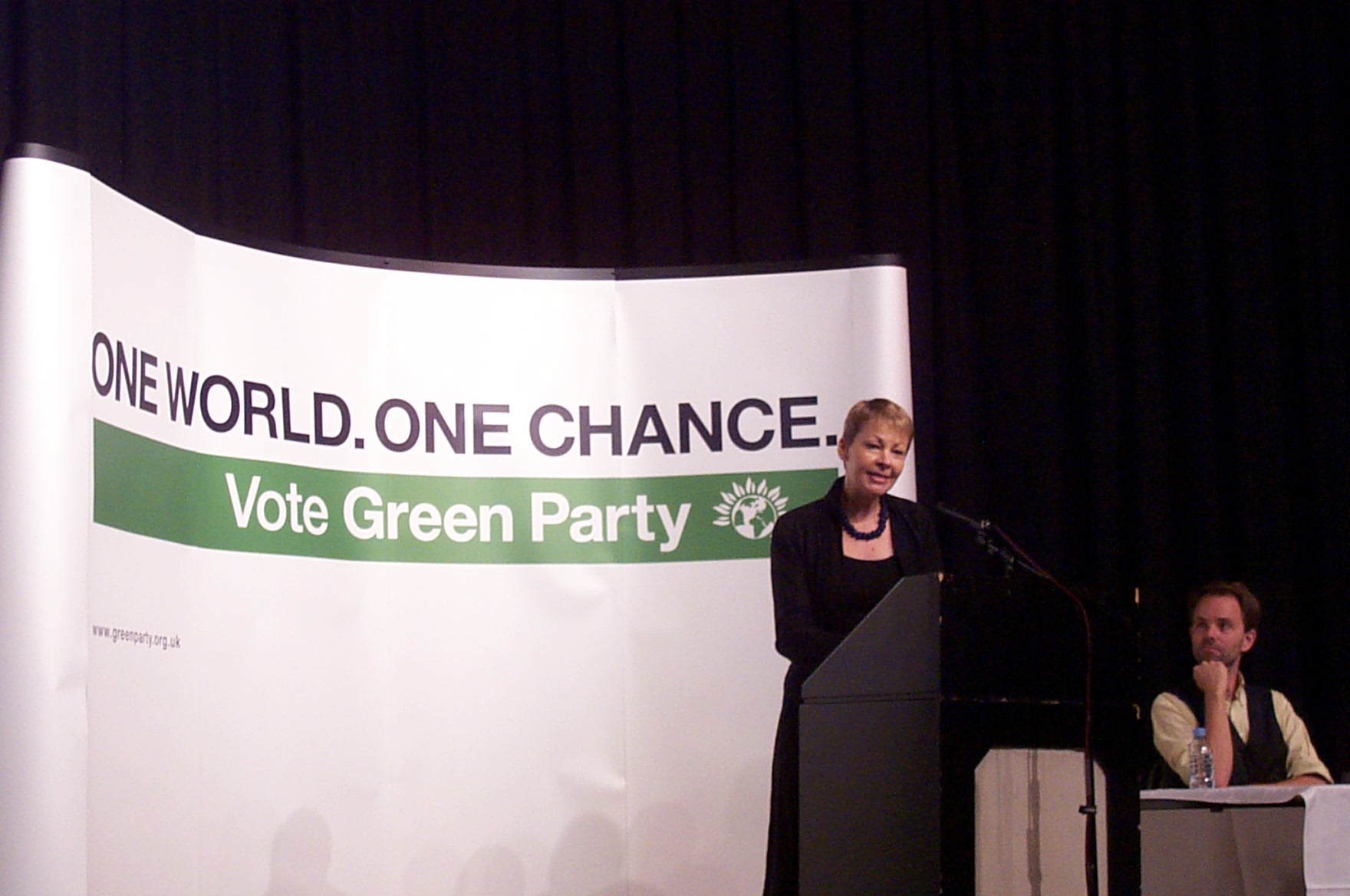
Caroline Lucas giving a keynote speech, with Rupert Read looking on, at the autumn conference of the Green Party of England and Wales, Hove, 2006

=== Green Party ===
Read was one of 13 Green Party councillors in Norwich, where he was first elected in 2004 to represent Wensum ward and re-elected in 2007 with 49% of the vote. He sat on the Joint Highways Committee of the city and county councils, and was spokesperson on Transport for the Green Party city councillors. Read stepped down from local politics in 2011 and Wensum was retained by the Green Party.

Having held a number of officer posts for the Eastern Region Green Party, at the beginning of 2007 Read was selected as Eastern Region Green Party's lead candidate for the European Parliament elections in 2009 and again in 2014. The East of England is one of the Green Party's stronger regions in terms of support, and under the proportional representation system on which the European elections operate, the party was optimistic that he would represent them in the European Parliament. However, he was beaten to the last of the seven seats in the constituency by the UK Independence Party (UKIP) in 2009, and similarly in 2014. For the 2019 European Elections, Read stood as the second ranked candidate on the Eastern Region list for the Green Party. He stood in the 2009 Norwich North by-election, as the Green Party candidate, and returned the then-biggest by-election vote share in Green history with 9.7% of the vote, which was not surpassed until the 2023 Somerton and Frome by-election.

Read stood as MP candidate for Cambridge in the 2015 general election. He came fourth, having received 8% of the vote.

In March 2019, Read delivered a talk at the Ealing Green Party in March 2019.

In April 2019, Read became the second candidate on the Green Party list for the Eastern Region in the 2019 EU Elections and spent time in May campaigning with Caroline Lucas across the region. Following the election, he became special adviser to Catherine Rowett during her time as an MEP: the first candidate on the Green Party list for the Eastern Region, who was elected an MEP.

Between 2013-2014, Read is recorded as having donated £50,011.69 to the Green Party.

=== School strike for climate ===
Read was one of 224 academics to sign an open letter of support for the School strike for climate – a movement where children walked out of schools to protest at and demand action on climate change. In February 2019, Read joined school strikers at the Forum Library in Norwich and subsequently gained media coverage for his own personal open letter to schools in Norwich urging them to be supportive of action from students.

=== Extinction Rebellion ===
In October 2018 Read declared himself a supporter of Extinction Rebellion, an environmental direct action group, becoming a signatory of their first and second open letters to The Guardian and taking part in at least one of their November actions in London. A month later, Read took part in a sit-in to disrupt the consultation stage of a link between two major A-roads across ecologically significant Wensum Valley in Norfolk.

In 2019, Read spoke to the Bath wing of Extinction Rebellion in a talk entitled "Your money or your life" which focused on biodiversity, pollution, and climate change before exploring practical options around responding to the climate and ecological 'emergencies'.

Read played a major role in the April 2019 Extinction Rebellion in London. In addition to joining and speaking to protesters across London, Read appeared on a number of news platforms as spokesman for Extinction Rebellion, putting forward their three demands not only to the New Scientist, but also to John Nicolson on talkRadio and Nick Ferrari on LBC; as well as debating Extinction Rebellion's approach and fracking's impact on climate change during Jacob Rees-Mogg’s LBC show; and explaining the Rebellion's approach to Doug Henwood’s KPFA radio show in the USA.

On television, Read appeared on Channel 5's 5 News in a performance described by Naomi Klein as "absolutely amazing", and BBC Politics Live where he notably successfully put pressure on Labour MP Jenny Chapman and Conservative minister Nadhim Zahawi to agree, live on TV, to meet Extinction Rebellion, and additionally demanded that politicians stop spreading the myth – and misleading statistics – that the UK is a leader on climate change action. More recently during the October 2019 Extinction Rebellion, Read appeared on BBC question time along with Secretary of State for Transport Grant Shapps MP, Lisa Nandy MP, businessman Theo Paphitis and journalist Julia Hartley-Brewer.

Through the work of their protests, Extinction Rebellion were invited to talk to the Mayor of London Sadiq Khan and Shadow Chancellor John McDonnell. Additionally, Read was personally involved in meeting Environment Secretary Michael Gove at DEFRA where he put forward Extinction Rebellion's demands and concerns directly to the government.

A day later the UK Parliament became the first in the world to declare a "climate change emergency"; part of the first one of Extinction Rebellion's three demands.

In 2020, Read orchestrated the leak of the JP Morgan report saying Earth is on unsustainable trajectory, in which the major fossil fuel financier warned its clients of the economic risks of man-made global warming.

In July 2020, Read published a collection of essays entitled Extinction Rebellion: Insights from the Inside about his experiences of being involved in Extinction Rebellion from its inception in 2018 up until the Covid pandemic. This piece was edited by, and contains a postscript from, Samuel Alexander.

Read is no longer a spokesperson for Extinction Rebellion, as he refuses to speak to any Murdoch-owned outlets "until climate change is front page news," and he felt that this stance would weaken his ability to be an efficient spokesperson for the activist organisation going forward.

=== Climate Majority Project ===
Read is now the co-director of the Climate Majority Project (previously known as the Moderate Flank) which aims to bring "funding and expertise to initiatives working to bring serious climate action into the mainstream." The Climate Majority Project endorses a moderate form of climate activism to encourage mass support from a variety of places, arguing that whilst Extinction Rebellion has been extremely successful in elevating climate change as a political and social issue, some of its tactics risk isolating people. On an issue as crucial as climate change, Read believes that all people must have an outlet to express their concerns and pressurise for political change, which requires the formation of a less radical wing of the climate movement. Another central part of the moderate flank is to avoid stances on identity politics in an attempt to maximise participation from all sides of the political spectrum. The Climate Majority Project is supported by veteran environmental campaigner Swampy, Conservative Lord John Randall, former Child's Laureate Michael Rosen, BBC Presenter Chris Packham, and former Chairman of the CCC Lord Deben.

Since the Climate Majority Project's launch in June 2023, Read has appeared on ITV News, Andrew Marr's show on LBC, and Good Morning Britain (alongside Swampy) to make the case for the Climate Majority Project. In Read's own words, "The Climate Majority Project is for anyone and everyone who is serious about taking action on this existential threat that now faces us, but doesn't want to glue themselves to anything."

=== Political journalism ===
Read was a regular contributor to the One World Column in the EDP, focusing on international development, poverty, globalisation, peacemaking, human rights, international relations and the environment. He has also had various articles appear in The Independent, The Guardian, and The Conversation.

=== Leave Our Kids Alone ===
Read is co-founder of the Leave our Kids Alone campaign, which seeks a ban on all advertising targeting children under 11.

=== Guardians for future generations ===
Read has developed, on the basis of his research in political and environmental philosophy, a radical proposal for institutional reform, to provide a place in the UK's democratic system for a voice for future people. The proposal was launched at Parliament on 10 January 2012.

== Works ==
- (Co-authored with James L. Guetti) Meaningful Consequences, The Philosophical Forum, Volume XXXth, Issue 4, December 1999, Pages 289–315.
- (Edited with Alice Crary) The New Wittgenstein, London: Routledge, 2000.
- (Co-authored with Wes Sharrock) Kuhn: Philosopher of Scientific Revolution, Oxford: Polity, (2002).
- (Co-edited with Jerry Goodenough) Film as Philosophy: Essays in Cinema after Wittgenstein and Cavell (2005).
- Philosophy for Life: Applying Philosophy in Politics and Culture (2007).
- (Co-authored with Matthew A. Lavery) 'Beyond the Tractatus Wars: The New Wittgenstein Debate' (2011)
- 'A Wittgensteinian Way with Paradoxes' (2012)
- Nassim Nicholas Taleb, Rupert Read, Raphael Douady, Joseph Norman, Yaneer Bar-Yam. The Precautionary Principle (With Application to the Genetic Modification of Organisms), (2014).
- "The Tale Parfit Tells: Analytic Metaphysics of Personal Identity vs. Wittgensteinian Film and Literature," in Philosophy and Literature 39.1 (April 2015): 128–53.
- 'A Film-Philosophy of Ecology and Environment' (2018)
- (Co-authored with Samuel Alexander) 'This Civilisation Is Finished' (2019)
- (Co-authored with Samuel Alexander) 'Extinction Rebellion: Insights From The Inside' (2020)
- 'Wittgenstein's Liberatory Philosophy: Thinking Through His Philosophical Investigations' (2020)
- 'Parents For A Future: how loving our children can prevent climate collapse' (2021)
- (Co-edited with Ian Sinclair) 'A Timeline of the Plague Year: A Comprehensive Record of the UK Government's Response to the Coronavirus Crisis' (2021)
- (Co-edited with Jem Bendell) 'Deep Adaptation: Navigating the Realities of Climate Chaos' (2021)
- 'Why Climate Breakdown Matters' (2022)
- 'Do You Want To Know The Truth' (2022)
