= 2004 Broadland District Council election =

Broadland District Council election

Results of the 2004 Broadland District Council election

The 2004 Broadland District Council election took place on 10 June 2004 to elect members of Broadland District Council in England. This was on the same day as other local elections.

The whole council was up for election on new ward boundaries.

== Election result ==
2004 Broadland District Council election
Party	Seats	Gains	Losses	Net gain/loss	Seats %	Votes %	Votes	+/−
Conservative	31			▲4	66.0	44.9	31,675	+12.5
Liberal Democrats	11			▼1	23.4	26.3	18,562	-2.5
Independent	5			▼1	10.6	7.8	5,487	-1.4
Labour	0			▼4	0.0	19.7	13,867	-5.3
Green	0			Steady	0.0	0.7	475	-4.0
UKIP	0			Steady	0.0	0.6	408	N/A
