= 1996 Broadland District Council election =

Broadland District Council election

The 1996 Broadland District Council election took place on 2 May 1996 to elect members of Broadland District Council in England. This was on the same day as other local elections.

== Election result ==
1996 Broadland District Council election
Party	This election			Full council			This election		
Party	Seats	Net	Seats %	Other	Total	Total %	Votes	Votes %	+/−
Labour	7	▲7	43.8	14	21	42.9	7,861	40.7	+0.3
Liberal Democrats	3	▲1	18.8	10	13	26.5	3,956	20.5	-6.4
Conservative	5	▼9	31.3	5	10	20.4	6,729	34.9	+7.4
Independent	1	▲1	6.3	4	5	10.2	683	3.5	+1.1
Green	0	Steady	0.0	0	0	0.0	69	0.4	+0.2
