= 1992 Broadland District Council election =

Broadland District Council election

The 1992 Broadland District Council election took place on 7 May 1992 to elect members of Broadland District Council in England. This was on the same day as other local elections.

== Election result ==
1992 Broadland District Council election
Party	This election			Full council			This election		
Party	Seats	Net	Seats %	Other	Total	Total %	Votes	Votes %	+/−
Conservative	14	Steady	87.5	12	26	53.1	9,355	51.8	+12.5
Liberal Democrats	2	Steady	12.5	6	8	16.3	3,824	21.2	+5.6
Independent	0	Steady	0.0	8	8	16.3	374	2.1	-12.6
Labour	0	Steady	0.0	7	7	14.3	4,385	24.3	-6.1
Ind. Conservative	0	Steady	0.0	0	0	0.0	106	0.6	N/A
