= 2000 Broadland District Council election =

Local government election in England

The 2000 Broadland District Council election took place on 4 May 2000 to elect members of Broadland District Council in England. This was on the same day as other local elections.

== Election result ==
2000 Broadland District Council election
Party	This election			Full council			This election		
Party	Seats	Net	Seats %	Other	Total	Total %	Votes	Votes %	+/−
Conservative	13	▲8	81.3	18	31	63.3	8,656	50.2	+7.8
Labour	1	▼6	6.3	7	8	16.3	4,897	28.4	-4.7
Liberal Democrats	2	▼1	12.5	6	8	16.3	3,425	19.9	-2.9
Independent	0	▼1	0.0	2	2	4.1	N/A	N/A	-1.7
Ind. Conservative	0	Steady	0.0	0	0	0.0	231	1.3	N/A
Liberal	0	Steady	0.0	0	0	0.0	20	0.1	N/A
