= 1995 Broadland District Council election =

Broadland District Council election

The 1995 Broadland District Council election took place on 4 May 1995 to elect members of Broadland District Council in England. This was on the same day as other local elections.

== Election result ==
1995 Broadland District Council election
Party	This election			Full council			This election		
Party	Seats	Net	Seats %	Other	Total	Total %	Votes	Votes %	+/−
Conservative	2	▼3	12.5	17	19	38.8	5,288	27.5	-5.8
Labour	10	▲8	62.5	4	14	28.6	7,779	40.4	+9.8
Liberal Democrats	2	▼2	12.5	10	12	24.5	5,180	26.9	-6.7
Independent	2	▼3	12.5	2	4	8.2	951	4.9	+2.4
Green	0	Steady	0.0	0	0	0.0	36	0.2	N/A
