= 1999 Broadland District Council election =

Broadland District Council election

The 1999 Broadland District Council election took place on 6 May 1999 to elect members of Broadland District Council in England. This was on the same day as other local elections.

== Election result ==
1999 Broadland District Council election
Party	This election			Full council			This election		
Party	Seats	Net	Seats %	Other	Total	Total %	Votes	Votes %	+/−
Conservative	7	▲5	43.8	16	23	46.9	6,645	42.4	-1.2
Labour	4	▼6	25.0	10	14	28.6	5,196	33.1	+0.7
Liberal Democrats	4	▲2	25.0	5	9	18.4	3,577	22.8	+3.2
Independent	1	▼1	6.3	2	3	6.1	271	1.7	-2.7
