= 2011 Broadland District Council election =

UK local election

- 5 May 2007

All 47 seats to Broadland District Council 24 seats needed for a majority

	First party	Second party
Party	Conservative	Liberal Democrats
Seats won	34	12
Seat change	▼1	▲3
Popular vote	40,191	18,879
Percentage	50.9%	25.5%
Swing	▲0.2%	▼3.1%
	Third party	Fourth party
Party	Labour	Independent
Seats won	1	0
Seat change	▲1	▼3
Popular vote	15,123	1,163
Percentage	19.1%	1.5%
Swing	▲6.9%	▼6.7%
- Winner of each seat at the 2011 Broadland District Council election.
Council control before election
Conservative
Council control after election
Conservative

The 2011 Broadland District Council election took place on 5 May 2011 to elect members of Broadland District Council in Norfolk, England. This was on the same day as other local elections.

== Summary ==
=== Election result ===
2011 Broadland District Council election
Party	Candidates	Seats	Gains	Losses	Net gain/loss	Seats %	Votes %	Votes	+/−
Conservative	47	34	5	6	▼1	72.3	50.9	40,191	+0.2
Liberal Democrats	43	12	6	3	▲3	25.5	23.9	18,879	–3.1
Labour	30	1	1	0	▲1	2.1	19.1	15,123	+6.9
UKIP	9	0	0	0	Steady	0.0	2.8	2,205	+2.4
Green	6	0	0	0	Steady	0.0	1.9	1,468	+0.4
Independent	2	0	0	3	▼3	0.0	1.5	1,163	–6.7
