= 1994 Broadland District Council election =

Broadland District Council election

The 1994 Broadland District Council election took place on 5 May 1994 to elect members of Broadland District Council in England. It took place on the same day as other local elections.

== Election results ==
1994 Broadland District Council election
Party	This election			Full council			This election		
Party	Seats	Net	Seats %	Other	Total	Total %	Votes	Votes %	+/−
Conservative	4	▼4	23.5	18	22	44.9	7,499	33.3	-18.5
Liberal Democrats	8	▲6	47.1	6	14	28.6	7,568	33.6	+12.4
Independent	2	▼1	11.8	5	7	14.3	564	2.5	+0.4
Labour	3	▼1	17.6	3	6	12.2	6,908	30.6	+6.3
