= James L. Guetti =

James L. Guetti (November 5, 1937 – January 11, 2007) was a philosopher of language, author, and a professor of English at Rutgers University.

His main interests were the fiction of Joseph Conrad and the philosophy of Ludwig Wittgenstein. The goals of his teaching were to have his students become better thinkers and more effective writers.

Born in Medford, Massachusetts, son of James and Gladys (Cutter) Guetti, his family moved to Florida when he was three years old. He spent his early childhood years in Miami, Hialeah, and Sweetwater. During his adolescence, his family moved back to Massachusetts, this time to Orange. From there, they relocated to Warwick, Rhode Island, where Jim graduated from James T. Lockwood High School in 1955.

As the first in his family to attend college, he received several academic and athletic awards at Amherst College. The latter awards were for his prowess in football. In 1959, he was awarded his A.B. degree cum laude. A year later, he received his M.A. from Cornell University. A Ph.D. from the same institution followed in 1964.

He then taught English at The Taft School for a year. Subsequently, he transferred to Rutgers University where he was an English professor for 36 years. Jim Guetti died of cancer at his home in Leverett, Massachusetts. He was married, with two sons.

== Career ==
Rupert Read of the University of East Anglia wrote a personal obituary for James Guetti, in which he expressed the following: "I was privileged to work closely with Guetti while I was a grad student at Rutgers, and to write with him then and afterwards. He was a massively stimulating colleague, an extraordinary mentor — and (to coin a much-abused term, which in this case is justly applied) an absolutely inspirational teacher."

Another former student, Millburn, New Jersey attorney Anthony Gaeta, said, "He made me more precise in how I communicate, and expanded my ability to really understand what people are saying when they use words." Rutgers professor Barry Qualls recalled, "Jim was breathtakingly smart and very funny, and didn't care for other people's sanctities. He had a feisty intelligence that didn't jump on bandwagons."

Barry Lipinski, a student of Jim Guetti in the undergraduate and graduate program at Rutgers who became a good friend, said “Jim gave me the highest compliment. He said “You are a word man; you care about words.” Barry said “I read Jim's novel “Action” when it first came out through my Baltimore County Enoch Pratt library system when I was a senior in high school and I was determined to take a course with him at Rutgers after reading it. Jim could not believe the level of detail I knew about the book and how his novel spurred me to visit Pimlico race track and become a lifelong devotee of thoroughbred racing and start a friendship with a buddy who would teach me the value of reading every word.”

Besides being a teaching writer of academic topics, as well as fiction, James Guetti had several other interests. He was very well versed in fishing, fly tying, cooking, and poker. To his advantage, he discovered that certain thoroughbred horses run faster when they first change from running on dirt to running on turf. His brother Michael, a retired Star Ledger sports writer, remembers Jim's adventurousness: "... tramping through the Everglades with just a knife in his back pocket." Also, Mike asserts that his brother "... was the most original thinker I've ever met. He was as serious about horse racing and flyfishing as he was about literature. He had a way of stringing ideas together to reach a clear sense of things."

== Works ==
Scholar Robert S. Ryf examined Guetti's assertion in The Limits of Metaphor regarding ineffability in the works of Melville, Conrad, and Faulkner. Because words, according to Guetti, are unable to express thoughts about reality, they become a mere communication about nothingness. Ryf claimed that "The argument deserves most serious attention, and is generally ably advanced."

Three years after the publication of Guetti's Action, the very similar movie The Gambler appeared. There has never been a statement, however, that the movie was taken from Guetti's book. William Pritchard, the Henry Clay Folger Professor of English at Amherst College, wrote about this novel. According to him, Action is "… exceptional in conveying some of the surprise, the uncertainty, the mixed feeling about what has been done." Professor Roger Sale, of the University of Washington, wrote that Action is "… the best novel I know about gambling, and indeed is so much better than most that the others cease to count. Furthermore, it has a grand opening sequence that is, by itself, a first-rate short story, and, to boot, a wonderful indicator for any wary reader of what is in store."

In Word-Music, Professor Guetti draws attention to two aspects of modern literature: visual and aural. With visual reading, the reader looks for a sensible meaning in the narrative. Scenes, colors, and other visual images are understood as being in a sequence. The reader's mind thereby actively creates a story that can be understood as an arrangement of a meaningful series of visual events. Aural reading, on the other hand is receptive. The reader is listening to a story. Elements of the narrative are not necessarily sequential. There can be repetitions or variations on a theme, as in music. The story is more playful than purposeful. Most works of modern fiction combine visual and aural ways of reading, being not exclusively one or the other. This analysis of the complicated response of the individual reader is in contrast to the usual concern with plot, characterization, and other textual topics.

The introduction to the Penguin Books edition of Conrad's Heart of Darkness contains editor Paul O'Prey's citation of Guetti's idea regarding central meaning: "Conrad leads us to expect, because of the myth–like nature of the journey discussed earlier, that by going to the centre, to the 'Inner Station', to the very heart of the matter, there will be some enlightenment, some meaning given. Yet, as James Guetti shows in his essay " 'Heart of Darkness': The Failure of Imagination", the story " … as the account of a journey into the center of things — of Africa, of Kurtz, of Marlow, and of human existence — poses itself as the refutation of such a journey and as the refutation of the general metaphorical conception that meaning may be found within, beneath, at the center. At the end of the search we encounter a darkness, and it is no more defined than at the beginning of the journey and the narration: it continues to exist only as something unapproachable. The unapproachable is, however, tremendously 'significant'.

In his "Fictions of Violence in The Deerslayer", Professor Michael Kowalewski of Carleton College referred to Guetti's article on detective fiction. He discusses Guetti's explanation of the way that realistic fiction sustains the illusion of life by directing focus to the imagined world and not to the words that the author used.

Regarding his book Wittgenstein and the Grammar of Literary Experience, Rupert Read claimed "This remarkable work is a beautiful compendium of stunningly sensitive close-readings and close-hearings (of Hemingway, Ransom, Stevens, Faulkner, Frost …), braided together by means of promptings from Wittgenstein."

== Bibliography ==
=== Books ===
- The Limits of Metaphor, A Study of Melville, Conrad, and Faulkner, Cornell University Press, 1967
- Action, The Dial Press, 1971
- Word-Music, Rutgers University Press, 1980, ISBN 0-8135-0883-5
- Wittgenstein and the Grammar of Literary Experience, University of Georgia Press, 1993, ISBN 0-8203-1496-X
- Silver Kings, iUniverse, Inc., 2005, ISBN 0-595-35894-2

=== Journal articles ===
- "Wittgenstein, Conrad, and The Darkness," Symploke II. 1 (Winter 1994)
- "Idling Rules," Philosophical Investigations, 16:3 (Summer 1993)
- "Wittgenstein and Literary Theory, Part II," Raritan, (Winter, 1985)
- "Wittgenstein and Literary Theory, Part I," Raritan, (Fall, 1984)
- "Theory Troubles," Raritan, Spring 1984
- "Aggressive Reading: Detective Fiction and Realistic Narrative," Raritan 2:2, Summer 1982: 133-54
- "'Heart of Darkness' and the Failure of Imagination," Sewanee Review, (Summer 1965)
- "Acting From Rules: "Internal Relations' vs 'Logical Existentialism'," International Studies in Philosophy, (Spring 1996)
- "Monologic and dialogic: Wittgenstein, Heart of Darkness, and linguistic skepticism," The Literary Wittgenstein, Routledge, 2004, ISBN 0-415-28973-4
