= 2003 Broadland District Council election =

Broadland District Council election

The 2003 Broadland District Council election took place on 1 May 2003 to elect members of Broadland District Council in England. This was on the same day as other local elections.

== Election result ==
2003 Broadland District Council election
Party	This election			Full council			This election		
Party	Seats	Net	Seats %	Other	Total	Total %	Votes	Votes %	+/−
Conservative	6	▼1	37.5	21	27	55.1	4,962	32.4	-8.4
Liberal Democrats	6	▲2	37.5	6	12	24.5	4,414	28.8	+5.8
Independent	3	▲2	18.8	3	6	12.2	1,406	9.2	-2.5
Labour	1	▼3	6.3	3	4	8.2	3,833	25.0	+1.9
Green	0	Steady	0.0	0	0	0.0	718	4.7	+3.4
