= 2007 Broadland District Council election =

Broadland District Council election

- 3 May 2007

All 47 seats to Broadland District Council 24 seats needed for a majority

	First party	Second party	Third party
Party	Conservative	Liberal Democrats	Independent
Seats won	35	9	3
Seat change	▲4	▼2	▼2
Popular vote	34,053	18,153	5,490
Percentage	50.7%	27.0%	8.2%
Swing	▲5.8%	▲0.7%	▲0.4%
- Winner of each seat at the 2007 Broadland District Council election
Council control before election
Conservative
Council control after election
Conservative

The 2007 Broadland District Council election took place on 3 May 2007 to elect members of Broadland District Council in England. This was on the same day as other local elections.

== Election result ==
2007 Broadland District Council election
Party	Seats	Gains	Losses	Net gain/loss	Seats %	Votes %	Votes	+/−
Conservative	35			▲4	74.5	50.7	34,053	+5.8
Liberal Democrats	9			▼2	19.1	27.0	18,153	+0.7
Independent	3			▼2	6.4	8.2	5,490	+0.4
Labour	0			Steady	0.0	12.2	8,165	-7.5
Green	0			Steady	0.0	1.5	1,033	+0.8
UKIP	0			Steady	0.0	0.4	249	-0.2
