= 1998 Broadland District Council election =

Broadland District Council election

The 1998 Broadland District Council election took place on 7 May 1998 to elect members of Broadland District Council in England. This was on the same day as other local elections.

== Election result ==
1998 Broadland District Council election
Party	This election			Full council			This election		
Party	Seats	Net	Seats %	Other	Total	Total %	Votes	Votes %	+/−
Labour	2	▼1	11.8	18	20	40.8	5,057	32.4	-8.3
Conservative	12	▲8	70.6	6	18	36.7	6,812	43.6	+8.7
Liberal Democrats	2	▼6	11.8	5	7	14.3	3,058	19.6	-0.9
Independent	1	▼1	5.9	3	4	8.2	680	4.4	+0.9
