= 2015 Broadland District Council election =

2015 UK local government election

Results of the 2015 Broadland District Council election

The 2015 Broadland District Council election took place on 7 May 2015 to elect members of the Broadland District Council in England. They were held on the same day as other local elections.
