= 1991 Broadland District Council election =

Broadland District Council election

The 1991 Broadland District Council election took place on 2 May 1991 to elect members of Broadland District Council in England. This was on the same day as other local elections.

== Election result ==
1991 Broadland District Council election
Party	This election			Full council			This election		
Party	Seats	Net	Seats %	Other	Total	Total %	Votes	Votes %	+/−
Conservative	5	▼5	31.3	21	26	53.1	7,402	39.3	+9.9
Liberal Democrats	4	▲2	25.0	4	8	16.3	2,945	15.6	-11.4
Independent	5	▲1	31.3	3	8	16.3	2,769	14.7	+4.4
Labour	2	▲2	12.5	5	7	14.3	5,733	30.4	-1.8
