= 2002 Broadland District Council election =

Broadland District Council election

The 2002 Broadland District Council election took place on 2 May 2002 to elect members of Broadland District Council in England. This was on the same day as other local elections.

== Election result ==
2002 Broadland District Council election
Party	This election			Full council			This election		
Party	Seats	Net	Seats %	Other	Total	Total %	Votes	Votes %	+/−
Conservative	9	▼3	52.9	19	28	57.1	7,381	40.8	-9.4
Liberal Democrats	4	▲2	23.5	6	10	20.4	4,164	23.0	+3.1
Labour	1	▼1	5.9	6	7	14.3	4,178	23.1	-5.3
Independent	3	▲2	17.6	1	4	8.2	2,117	11.7	N/A
Green	0	Steady	0.0	0	0	0.0	240	1.3	N/A
