= 2009 Norwich North by-election =

2009 by-election won by Chloe Smith

- 23 July 2009

Norwich North parliamentary seat
- Turnout: 45.9%
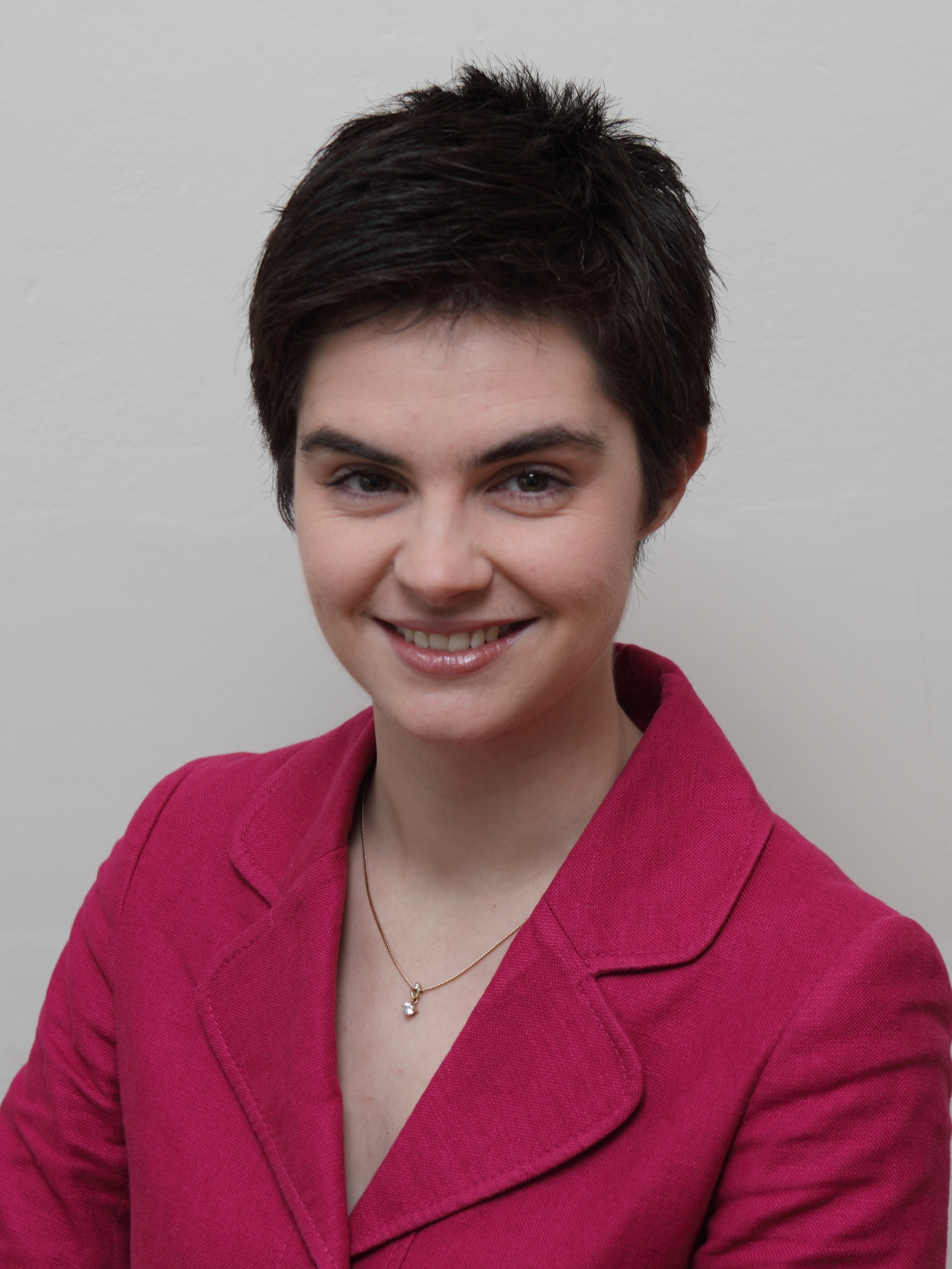

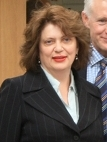

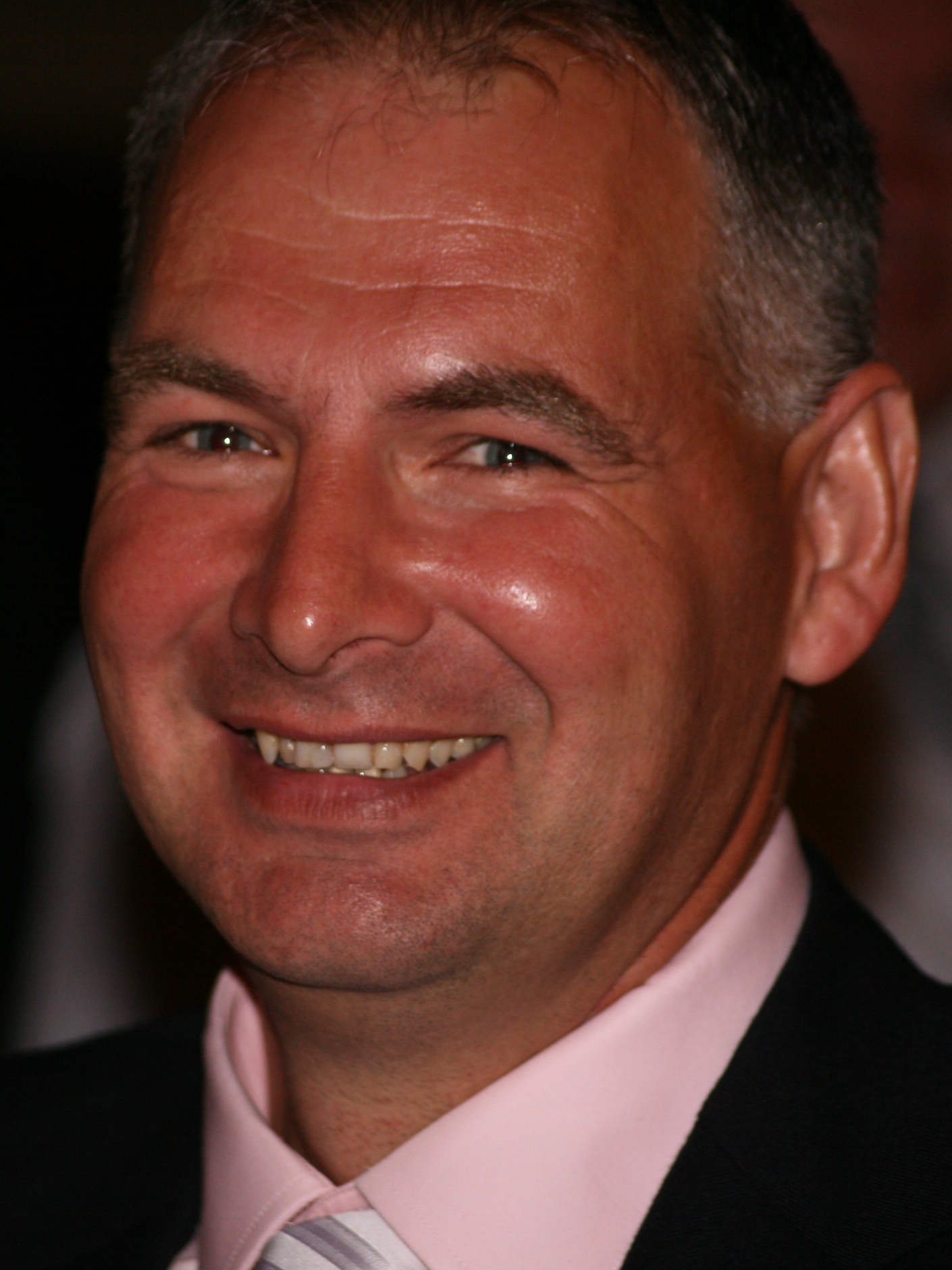

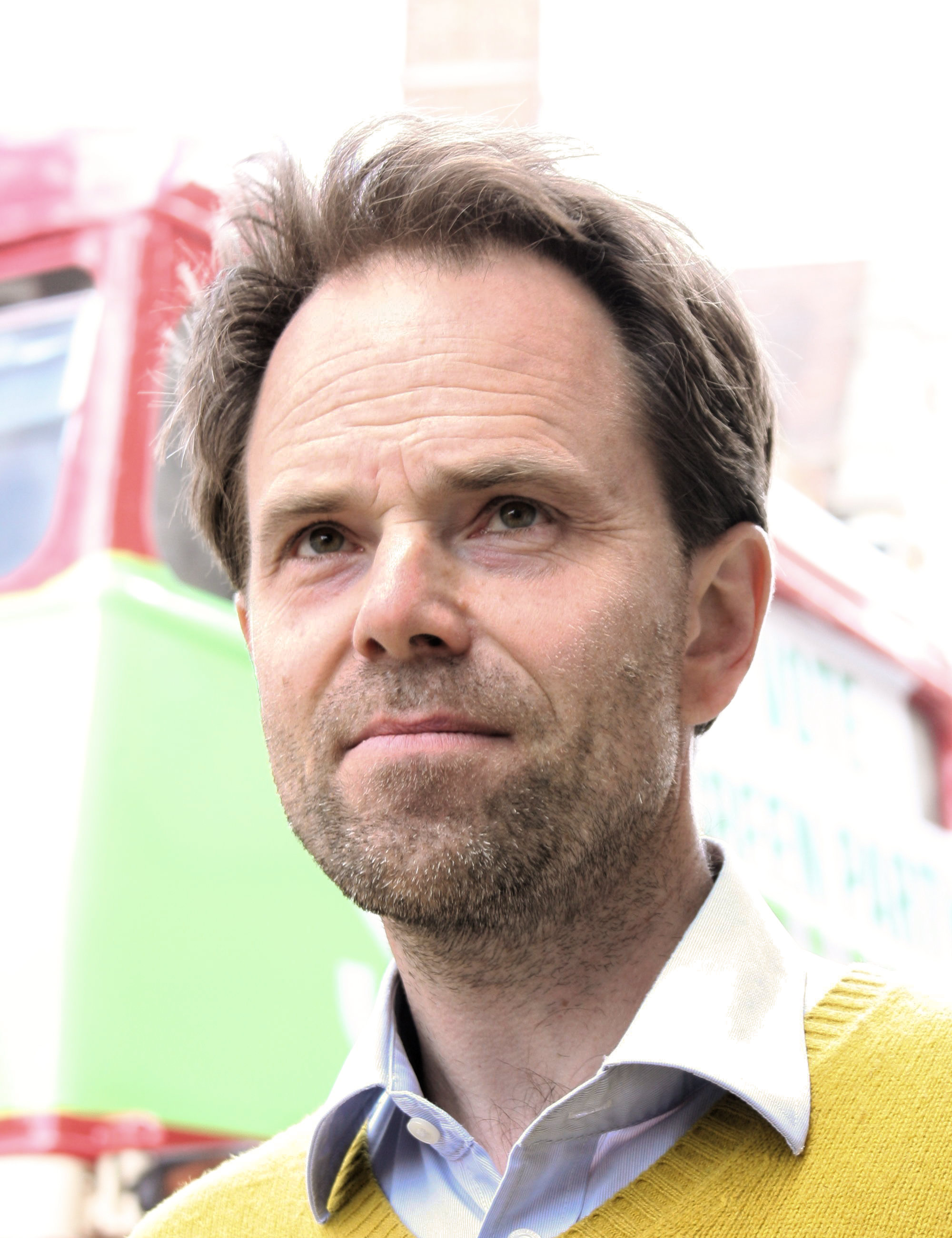
	First party	Second party	Third party
		Lab
Candidate	Chloe Smith	Chris Ostrowski	April Pond
Party	Conservative	Labour	Liberal Democrats
Popular vote	13,591	6,243	4,803
Percentage	39.5%	18.2%	14.0%
Swing	▲6.3%	▼26.7%	▼2.2%
	Fourth party	Fifth party
Candidate	Glenn Tingle	Rupert Read
Party	UKIP	Green
Popular vote	4,068	3,350
Percentage	11.6%	9.7%
Swing	▲9.4%	▲7.0%
MP before election
Ian Gibson
Labour
Subsequent MP
Chloe Smith
Conservative

A by-election for the United Kingdom parliamentary constituency of Norwich North was held on 23 July 2009, following the resignation of incumbent Labour Party MP Ian Gibson after being banned from standing as the party's candidate at the next general election due to the MPs' expenses scandal. It was won by Chloe Smith of the Conservative Party, who at 27 years old became the youngest member of the House of Commons, known as the Baby of the House.

== Background ==
In May 2009, sitting Labour MP Ian Gibson became embroiled in the MPs' expenses scandal, reportedly claiming for a flat in which his daughter lived rent-free before selling it to her for half its market value. As a result of this, he was blocked from standing in the 2010 general election by a Labour Party disciplinary panel, which his constituency chairman called a "kangaroo court", resulting in the resignation of the constituency chairman from the role and the party.

Gibson was said to be "deeply disappointed" by the panel's decision. Saying that his position was "untenable", he announced his resignation as an MP on 5 June 2009 by applying for the Chiltern Hundreds. The writ to trigger the by-election was moved on 30 June.

== Boundaries ==
As boundary changes did not come into effect until the 2010 general election, Norwich North was fought on those boundaries in place at the 2005 general election.

The constituency includes parts of two local government areas, Norwich and Broadland, with the majority of the electorate in Broadland. Nine wards of Broadland (Mile Cross, Crome, Thorpe St Andrew, Sprowston, Old Catton, Catton Grove, Hellesdon, Drayton and Taverham) fall within its boundaries, together with four wards of the City of Norwich (Catton Grove, Crome, Mile Cross, Sewell).

In boundary changes in place for the 2010 general election, Norwich North lost Taverham North, Taverham South, Drayton North and Drayton South to the new Broadland constituency.

== Candidates ==
The Labour Party selected Chris Ostrowski, a University of East Anglia graduate, as their candidate on 28 June.

The Conservative Party had already selected Chloe Smith as their candidate for the general election.

The Liberal Democrats selected April Pond, a local businesswoman and former Norwich City Councillor, who was a candidate for South West Norfolk in 2005.

The Green Party's candidate at the last general election, Adrian Holmes, announced that he would not be standing, and Norwich City Councillor Rupert Read, the Green Party's lead candidate for the East of England in the European elections, was selected on 24 June. In the European elections the Green Party polled 24.9% across Norwich, more than any other party, while they took 9.6% of the vote in Broadland.

Glenn Tingle stood for the UK Independence Party.

Other minor parties included Robert West for the British National Party, who stood as first candidate for the East Midlands Region in the 2009 European Elections, and the Official Monster Raving Loony Party's leader, Howling Laud Hope.

Three new parties stood candidates for the first time. The Libertarian Party selected 18-year-old Thomas Burridge as their first parliamentary candidate. NOTA, which stands for "None of the Above", a party set up by former boxer Terry Marsh, announced that Anne Fryatt would stand as their candidate. Former ambassador Craig Murray stood as an anti-sleaze candidate for the Put an Honest Man into Parliament party, which was registered with the Electoral Commission on 3 July 2009.

There were also two independent candidates: Bill Holden, who was a candidate in 2005, and Peter Baggs.

Ian Gibson announced that he would not be running as an independent candidate. On 26 June he hinted to Newsnight's Michael Crick that he might run as an independent, but he endorsed the Labour candidate three days later.

Broadland District Council published the Statement of Persons Nominated and Notice of Poll, which lists candidates' names, addresses, official descriptions, and names of nominators, on 8 July 2009.

== Result ==
Unusually for a UK by-election, the counting process was not started until the day after the election, for a variety of reasons including the high number of postal votes.

Both the UK Independence Party and the Green Party of England and Wales achieved their best results to date in a Parliamentary by-election; UKIP had previously taken a 10.2% share in the 2004 by-election in Hartlepool, and the Greens took 7.4% in the 2008 Haltemprice and Howden by-election. For the Greens this would stand until the 2023 Somerton and Frome by-election when Green Candidate Martin Dimery received 10.2% of the vote.

Norwich North by-election, 23 July 2009
Party	Candidate	Votes	%	±%
Conservative	Chloe Smith	13,591	39.5	+6.3
Labour	Chris Ostrowski	6,243	18.2	–26.7
Liberal Democrats	April Pond	4,803	14.0	–2.2
UKIP	Glenn Tingle	4,068	11.8	+9.4
Green	Rupert Read	3,350	9.7	+7.0
Put an Honest Man into Parliament	Craig Murray	953	2.8	New
BNP	Robert West	941	2.7	New
Independent	Bill Holden	166	0.5	–0.2
Monster Raving Loony	Alan Hope	144	0.4	New
NOTA	Anne Fryatt	59	0.2	New
Libertarian	Thomas Burridge	36	0.1	New
Independent	Peter Baggs	23	0.1	New
Majority		7,348	21.3	N/A
Turnout		34,377	45.9	–15.2
Conservative gain from Labour		Swing	+16.5	

== Previous result ==
General election 2005: Norwich North
Party	Candidate	Votes	%	±%
Labour	Ian Gibson	21,097	44.9	−2.5
Conservative	James Tumbridge	15,638	33.2	−1.4
Liberal Democrats	Robin Whitmore	7,616	16.2	+1.4
Green	Adrian Holmes	1,252	2.7	+1.0
UKIP	John Youles	1,122	2.4	+1.4
Independent	Bill Holden	308	0.7	New
Majority		5,459	11.7	−1.1
Turnout		47,033	61.1	+2.0
Labour hold		Swing	−0.6	
