= Parliamentary constituencies in Norfolk =

The county of Norfolk in relation to England

The county of Norfolk is divided into 10 parliamentary constituencies: 2 borough constituencies and 8 county constituencies. (Note: Waveney Valley is a cross-county boundary constituency with Suffolk)

== Constituencies ==
Conservative † Labour ‡ Liberal Democrat ¤ Restore Britain ± Green ¥

Constituency (Note: BC denotes borough constituency, CC denotes county constituency.)	Electorate	Majority (Note: The majority is the number of votes the winning candidate receives more than their nearest rival.)	Member of Parliament	Nearest opposition	Map
Broadland and Fakenham CC	76,863	719	Jerome Mayhew †	Iain Simpson ‡	
Great Yarmouth CC	73,317	1,426	Rupert Lowe ± (elected from Reform UK)	Keir Cozens ‡	
Mid Norfolk CC	75,238	3,054	George Freeman †	Michael Rosen ‡	
North Norfolk CC	71,438	2,585	Steffan Aquarone ¤	Duncan Baker †	
North West Norfolk CC	74,415	4,954	James Wild †	Tim Leaver ‡	
Norwich North BC	73,717	10,850	Alice Macdonald ‡	Charlotte Salomon †	
Norwich South BC	76,296	13,239	Clive Lewis ‡	Jamie Osborn ¥	
South Norfolk CC	74,006	2,826	Ben Goldsborough ‡	Poppy Simister-Thomas †	
South West Norfolk CC	74,724	630	Terry Jermy ‡	Liz Truss †	
Waveney Valley CC	73,056	5,593	Adrian Ramsay ¥	Richard Rout †	

== 2024 boundary changes ==
For the 2023 review of Westminster constituencies, which redrew the constituency map ahead of the 2024 United Kingdom general election, the Boundary Commission for England opted to combine Norfolk with Suffolk as a sub-region of the East of England region, with the creation of the cross-county boundary constituency of Waveney Valley, which incorporated areas transferred from South Norfolk to the north of the River Waveney, including the towns of Diss and Harleston. To compensate South Norfolk, Wymondham was transferred in from Mid Norfolk.

Apart from changes to align with new ward boundaries, the only other adjustment was to move Drayton from Broadland (renamed Broadland and Fakenham) to Norwich North.

Former name
1. Broadland CC
2. Great Yarmouth CC
3. Mid Norfolk CC
4. North Norfolk CC
5. North West Norfolk CC
6. Norwich North BC
7. Norwich South BC
8. South Norfolk CC
9. South West Norfolk CC
Boundaries 2010-2024

Current name
1. Broadland and Fakenham CC
2. Great Yarmouth CC
3. Mid Norfolk CC
4. North Norfolk CC
5. North West Norfolk CC
6. Norwich North BC
7. Norwich South BC
8. South Norfolk CC
9. South West Norfolk CC
10. Waveney Valley CC
Boundaries 2024–present

== Results history ==
=== 2024 ===
The number of votes cast for each political party who fielded candidates in constituencies comprising Norfolk in the 2024 general election were as follows: (Note: It should be acknowledged that as Waveney Valley is a cross-county constituency between Norfolk and Suffolk, and the results of UK elections on sub-constituency levels are not disclosed, the following vote shares include parts of the Waveney Valley constituency located in Suffolk.)

Party	Votes	%	Change from 2019	Seats	Change from 2019
Conservative	132,494	28.70%	▼28.9%	3	▼5
Labour	132,398	28.68%	▲2.8%	4	▲3
Reform	86,482	18.7%	▲18.0%	1	▲1
Liberal Democrats	50,962	11.0%	▼1.4%	1	▲1
Greens	50,249	10.9%	▲8.4	1	▲1
Others	8,999	1.9%	▲1.0%	0	0
Total	461,584	100.0		10	

=== Percentage votes ===
Primary data source: House of Commons research briefing - General election results from 1918 to 2019

Election year	1950	1951	1955	1959	1964	1966	1970	1974 (Feb)	1974 (Oct)	1979	1983	1987	1992	1997	2001	2005	2010	2015	2017	2019	2024
Conservative^{1}	44.2	50.4	50.5	50.6	47.8	47.7	51.4	42.7	43.3	50.9	49.7	51.0	49.2	36.7	41.6	39.9	43.1	44.9	52.7	57.6	28.7
Labour	46.9	49.6	49.5	47.3	46.8	51.0	43.6	35.3	38.9	35.7	22.0	22.9	31.2	39.9	35.5	30.0	19.0	22.7	33.4	25.9	28.7
Reform^{2}	-	-	-	-	-	-	-	-	-	-	-	-	-	-	-	-	-	-	-	0.7	18.7
Liberal Democrat^{3}	8.8	-	-	2.1	5.3	1.3	4.8	21.7	17.7	12.8	27.9	25.8	18.6	18.2	19.6	25.4	27.8	10.3	10.0	12.4	11.0
Green Party	-	-	-	-	-	-	-	-	-	-	-	*	*	*	*	*	3.2	5.1	1.6	2.5	10.9
UKIP	-	-	-	-	-	-	-	-	-	-	-	-	-	*	*	*	4.6	17.0	2.3	*	*
Other	-	-	-	-	0.1	-	0.2	0.3	0.1	0.6	0.3	0.2	1.0	5.1	3.3	4.7	2.3	0.1	0.1	0.8	1.9

^{1}Includes National Liberal Party up to 1966

^{2}As the Brexit Party in 2019

^{3}1950-1979 - Liberal; 1983 & 1987 - SDP–Liberal Alliance

* Included in Other

=== Seats ===
Election year	1950	1951	1955	1959	1964	1966	1970	1974 (Feb)	1974 (Oct)	1979	1983	1987	1992	1997	2001	2005	2010	2015	2017	2019	2024
Labour	5	2	3	3	4	5	1	2	2	2	0	1	1	4	3	3	0	1	1	1	4
Conservative^{1}	3	6	5	5	4	3	7	5	5	5	8	7	7	4	4	4	7	7	7	8	3
Reform	-	-	-	-	-	-	-	-	-	-	-	-	-	-	-	-	-	-	-	-	1
Liberal Democrat^{2}	0	0	0	0	0	0	0	0	0	0	0	0	0	0	1	1	2	1	1	0	1
Greens	-	-	-	-	-	-	-	-	-	-	-	0	0	0	0	0	0	0	0	0	1
Total	8	8	8	8	8	8	8	7	7	7	8	8	8	8	8	8	9	9	9	9	10

^{1}Includes National Liberal Party up to 1966

^{2}1950-1979 - Liberal; 1983 & 1987 - SDP–Liberal Alliance

=== Maps ===
==== 1885-1910 ====
1885

1886

1892

1895

1900

1906

Jan 1910

Dec 1910

==== 1918-1945 ====
1918

1922

1923

1924

1929

1931

1935

1945

==== 1950-1979 ====
1950

1951

1955

1959

1964

1966

1970

1974 Feb

1974 Oct

1979

==== 1983-2019 ====
1983

1987

1992

1997

2001

2005

2010

2015

2017

2019

==== 2024-present ====
2024

== Timeline ==
Green represents former constituencies, pink represents current ones.

Constituency	1295-1298	1298-1529	1529-1558	1558-1832	1832-1867	1867-1885	1885-1918	1918-1950	1950-1974	1974-1983	1983-2010	2010–present
Broadland												2010–present
Castle Rising				1558-1832								
Central Norfolk									1950-1974			
East Norfolk					1832-1867		1885-1950					
Great Yarmouth	1295-1867						1885–present					
King's Lynn		1298-1974										
Mid Norfolk							1885-1918				1983–present	
Norfolk	1295-1832											
North Norfolk						1867–present						
North West Norfolk							1885-1918			1974–present		
Norwich		1298-1950										
Norwich North									1950–present			
Norwich South									1950–present			
South Norfolk						1867–present						
South West Norfolk							1885–present					
Thetford			1529-1867									
West Norfolk					1832-1885							

== Historical representation by party ==
A cell marked → (with a different colour background to the preceding cell) indicates that the previous MP continued to sit under a new party name.

=== 1885 to 1918 ===
Conservative Labour Liberal Liberal Unionist

Constituency	1885	86	1886	86	1892	93	95	1895	98	99	1900	04	1906	06	Jan 1910	Dec 1910	12	15	18
Great Yarmouth	Tyler				Moorsom			Colomb					Fell						
King's Lynn	Bourke			Jarvis	Bowles								Bellairs	→	Bowles	Ingleby			
Norfolk East	Birkbeck				Price														
Norfolk Mid	R. Gurdon		→		Higgins	→	R. Gurdon	Wilson					Wodehouse		Boyle		→		Jodrell
Norfolk North	Cozens-Hardy									W. Gurdon					Buxton				
Norfolk North West	Arch		Cavendish-Bentinck		Arch						White						Hemmerde		
Norfolk South	Taylor		→						Soames										
Norfolk South West	Tyssen-Amherst				Hare								Winfrey						
Norwich (Two members)	Colman							Bullard				Tillett			Low			Young	
Norwich (Two members)	Bullard	Hoare											Roberts						

=== 1918 to 1950 ===
Coalition Labour Coalition Liberal (1918-22) / National Liberal (1922-23) Conservative Independent Labour Liberal

Constituency	1918	20	1922	1923	1924	26	1929	30	31	1931	1935	39	41	43	1945
Great Yarmouth	Fell		Harbord		Meyer		Harbord		→				Jewson		Kinghorn
King's Lynn	Jodrell			Woodwark	Roche						Maxwell			Roche	Wise
Norfolk East	Falcon			Seely	Neville		Lygon		→			Medlicott			
Norfolk North	King	→	Buxton					Noel-Buxton		Cook					Gooch
Norfolk South	Cozens-Hardy	Edwards	Hay	Edwards	Christie										Mayhew
Norfolk South West	Winfrey		→	McLean			Taylor			McLean	de Chair				Dye
Norwich (Two members)	Young		→	Jewson	Young	→	Shakespeare		→						Paton
Norwich (Two members)	Roberts		→	Smith	Fairfax		Smith			Hartland	Strauss				Noel-Buxton

=== 1950 to 1983 ===
Conservative Labour National Liberal (1931-68) Social Democratic

Constituency	1950	1951	55	1955	59	1959	62	1964	1966	1970	Feb 1974	Oct 1974	1979	81
Great Yarmouth	Kinghorn	Fell							Gray	Fell				
King's Lynn / North West Norfolk (1974)	Wise	Scott-Miller				Bullard		Page		Brocklebank-Fowler				→
Norfolk Central	Medlicott					Collard	Gilmour	→						
Norfolk North	Gooch							Hazell		Howell				
Norfolk South	Baker		Hill								MacGregor			
Norfolk South West	Dye	Bullard		Dye	Hilton			Hawkins						
Norwich North	Paton							Wallace			Ennals			
Norwich South	Strauss			Rippon				Norwood		Stuttaford	Garrett			

=== 1983 to present ===
Conservative Labour Liberal Democrats Reform Restore Britain Independent

Constituency	1983	1987	1992	1997	2001	2005	09	2010	2015	2017	2019	2024	25	26
Broadland / Broadland & Fakenham ('24)								Simpson			Mayhew			
Great Yarmouth	Carttiss			Wright				B. Lewis				Lowe	→	→
Mid Norfolk	Ryder			Simpson				Freeman						
North Norfolk	Howell			Prior	Lamb						Baker	Aquarone		
North West Norfolk	Bellingham			Turner	Bellingham						Wild			
Norwich North	Thompson			Gibson			Smith					Macdonald		
Norwich South	Powley	Garrett		Clarke				Wright	C. Lewis					
South Norfolk	MacGregor				Bacon							Goldsborough		
South West Norfolk	Hawkins	Shephard				Fraser		Truss				Jermy		

== See also ==
- List of parliamentary constituencies in the East of England (region)
- History of parliamentary constituencies and boundaries in Norfolk
