= List of electoral wards in Norfolk =

This is a list of electoral divisions and wards in the ceremonial county of Norfolk in the East of England. All changes since the re-organisation of local government following the passing of the Local Government Act 1972 are shown. The number of councillors elected for each electoral division or ward is shown in brackets.

== County council ==
Electoral Divisions from 1 April 1974 (first election 12 April 1973) to 2 May 1985:

1. Blofield & Flegg No. 1 (1)
2. Blofield & Flegg No. 2 (1)
3. Blofield & Felgg No. 3 (West Flegg) (1)
4. Blofield & Flegg No. 4 (1)
5. Blofield & Flegg No. 5 (1)
6. Cromer (1)
7. Depwade No. 1 (1)
8. Depwade No. 2 (1)
9. Depwade No. 3 (1)
10. Dereham (1)
11. Ditchingham (1)
12. Docking No. 1 (1)
13. Docking No. 2 (1)
14. Downham (1)
15. Erpingham No. 1 (1)
16. Erpingham No. 2 (1)
17. Feltwell (1)
18. Fincham (1)
19. Forehoe & Henstead No. 1 (Henstead) (1)
20. Forehoe & Henstead No. 2 (Humbleyar (1)
21. Forehoe & Henstead No. 3 (1)
22. Forehoe & Henstead No. 4 (1)
23. Great Yarmouth No. 1 (Magdalen) (1)
24. Great Yarmouth No. 2 (Gorleston) (1)
25. Great Yarmouth No. 3 (1)
26. Great Yarmouth No. 4 (1)
27. Great Yarmouth No. 5 (Nelson South) (1)
28. Great Yarmouth No. 6 (1)
29. Great Yarmouth No. 7 (1)
30. Hilgay (1)
31. Hunstanton (1)
32. Kings Lynn (Central) (1)
33. Kings Lynn (Gaywood) (1)
34. Kings Lynn (North) (1)
35. Kings Lynn (South) (1)
36. Loddon (1)
37. Lothingland North (1)
38. Mitford & Launditch No. 1 (Elmham) (1)
39. Mitford & Launditch No. 2 (1)
40. Mitford & Launditch No. 3 (Mattisha (1)
41. North Walsham (1)
42. Northern Freebridge Lynn (1)
43. Norwich (Bowthorpe) (1)
44. Norwich (Catton) (1)
45. Norwich (Coslany) (1)
46. Norwich (Crome) (1)
47. Norwich (Earlham) (1)
48. Norwich (Eaton) (1)
49. Norwich (Heigham) (1)
50. Norwich (Hellesdon) (1)
51. Norwich (Lakenham) (1)
52. Norwich (Mancroft) (1)
53. Norwich (Mousehold) (1)
54. Norwich (Nelson) (1)
55. Norwich (St Stephen) (1)
56. Norwich (Thorpe) (1)
57. Norwich (Town Close) (1)
58. Norwich (University) (1)
59. Sheringham (1)
60. Smallburgh (North) (1)
61. Smallburgh (South) (1)
62. Southern Freebridge Lynn (1)
63. St Faiths & Aylsham No. 1 (Aylsham (1)
64. St Faiths & Aylsham No. 2 (Reepham (1)
65. St Faiths & Aylsham No. 3 (1)
66. St Faiths & Aylsham No. 4 (1)
67. St Faiths & Aylsham No. 5 (1)
68. St Faiths & Aylsham No. 6 (1)
69. St Faiths & Aylsham No. 7 (1)
70. Swaffham (1)
71. Swaffham Rural (1)
72. Terrington (1)
73. Thetford No. 1 (1)
74. Thetford No. 2 (1)
75. Upwell (1)
76. Walsingham No. 1 (Fakenham) (1)
77. Walsingham No. 2 (Melton Constable) (1)
78. Walsingham No. 3 (1)
79. Walsoken (1)
80. Wayland No. 1 (Attleborough) (1)
81. Wayland No. 2 (Watton) (1)
82. Wayland No. 3 (1)
83. Wymondham (1)

Electoral Divisions from 2 May 1985 to 5 May 2005:

1. Acle (1)
2. Attleborough (1)
3. Aylsham (1)
4. Blofield & Brundall (1)
5. Bowthorpe (1)
6. Caister & Great Yarmouth North (1)
7. Catton Grove (1)
8. Clavering (1)
9. Coslany (1)
10. Costessey (1)
11. Crome (1)
12. Cromer (1)
13. Dereham East (1)
14. Dereham West (1)
15. Dersingham (1)
16. Diss (1)
17. Docking (1)
18. Downham Market (1)
19. East Depwade (1)
20. East Flegg (1)
21. Eaton (1)
22. Elmham & Mattishall (1)
23. Erpingham & Melton Constable (1)
24. Fakenham (1)
25. Feltwell (1)
26. Fincham (1)
27. Freebridge Lynn (1)
28. Gaywood North & Central (1)
29. Gaywood South (1)
30. Gorleston St Andrews (1)
31. Great Yarmouth Nelson (1)
32. Guiltcross (1)
33. Heigham (1)
34. Hellesdon (1)
35. Henderson (1)
36. Henstead (1)
37. Hingham (1)
38. Holt (1)
39. Horsford (1)
40. Humbleyard (1)
41. Hunstanton (1)
42. Kings Lynn North & Central (1)
43. Kings Lynn South (1)
44. Lakenham (1)
45. Loddon (1)
46. Long Stratton (1)
47. Lothingland East & Magdalen West (1)
48. Lothingland West (1)
49. Magdalen East & Claydon (1)
50. Mancroft (1)
51. Marshland North (1)
52. Marshland South (1)
53. Mile Cross (1)
54. Mousehold (1)
55. Mundesley (1)
56. Necton & Launditch (1)
57. Nelson (1)
58. North Smallburgh (1)
59. North Walsham (1)
60. Northgate (1)
61. Old Catton (1)
62. Reepham (1)
63. Sheringham (1)
64. South Smallburgh (1)
65. Southtown & Cobholm (1)
66. Sprowston (1)
67. St Stephen (1)
68. Swaffham (1)
69. Taverham (1)
70. Thetford East (1)
71. Thetford West (1)
72. Thorpe Hamlet (1)
73. Thorpe St Andrew (1)
74. Town Close (1)
75. University (1)
76. Watton (1)
77. Wells (1)
78. West Depwade (1)
79. West Flegg (1)
80. Winch (1)
81. Wissey (1)
82. Woodside (1)
83. Wroxham (1)
84. Wymondham (1)

Electoral Divisions from 5 May 2005 to 7 May 2026:

1. Acle (1)
2. Attleborough (1)
3. Aylsham (1)
4. Blofield & Brundall (1)
5. Bowthorpe (1)
6. Breydon (1)
7. Caister-on-Sea (1)
8. Catton Grove (1)
9. Clavering (1) †
10. Clenchwarton & King’s Lynn South (1)
11. Costessey (1)
12. Crome (1)
13. Cromer (1)
14. Dereham North (1)
15. Dereham South (1)
16. Dersingham (1)
17. Diss & Roydon (1)
18. Docking (1)
19. Downham Market (1)
20. Drayton & Horsford (1)
21. East Depwade (1) †
22. East Flegg (1)
23. Eaton (1)
24. Elmham & Mattishall (1)
25. Fakenham (1)
26. Feltwell (1)
27. Fincham (1)
28. Forehoe (1) †
29. Freebridge Lynn (1) ‡
30. Gayton & Nar Valley (1)
31. Gaywood North & Central (1) ‡
32. Gaywood South (1)
33. Gorleston St Andrews (1)
34. Guiltcross (1)
35. Hellesdon (1)
36. Henstead (1)
37. Hevingham & Spixworth (1)
38. Hingham (1)
39. Holt (1)
40. Hoveton & Stalham (1)
41. Humbleyard (1) †
42. King’s Lynn North & Central (1)
43. Lakenham (1)
44. Loddon (1) †
45. Long Stratton (1)
46. Lothingland (1)
47. Magdalen (1)
48. Mancroft (1)
49. Marshland North (1)
50. Marshland South (1)
51. Melton Constable (1)
52. Mile Cross (1)
53. Mundesley (1)
54. Necton & Launditch (1)
55. Nelson (1)
56. North Coast (1)
57. North Walsham East (1)
58. North Walsham West & Erpingham (1)
59. Old Catton (1)
60. Reepham (1)
61. Sewell (1)
62. Sheringham (1)
63. South Smallburgh (1)
64. Sprowston (1)
65. Swaffham (1)
66. Taverham (1)
67. The Brecks (1)
68. Thetford East (1)
69. Thetford West (1)
70. Thorpe Hamlet (1)
71. Thorpe St Andrew (1)
72. Town Close (1)
73. University (1)
74. Watton (1)
75. Wells (1)
76. Wensum (1)
77. West Depwade (1)
78. West Flegg (1)
79. Woodside (1)
80. Wroxham (1)
81. Wymondham (1)
82. Yare & All Saints (1)
83. Yarmouth Nelson & Southtown (1)
84. Yarmouth North & Central (1)

† minor boundary changes in 2009‡ minor boundary changes in 2013

Electoral divisions from 7 May 2026 to present:

1. Acle (1)
2. Attleborough (1)
3. Aylsham (1)
4. Blofield & Brundall (1)
5. Bowthorpe (1)
6. Breydon (1)
7. Catton Grove (1)
8. Clenchwarton & King's Lynn South (1)
9. Coltishall & Spixworth (1)
10. Costessey (1)
11. Crome (1)
12. Cromer (1)
13. Dereham North & Scarming (1)
14. Dereham South (1)
15. Dersingham (1)
16. Diss & Roydon (1)
17. Docking (1)
18. Downham Market (1)
19. Drayton & Horsford (1)
20. East Depwade (1)
21. Eaton (1)
22. Elmham & Mattishall (1)
23. Erpingham (1)
24. Fakenham & The Raynhams (1)
25. Feltwell (1)
26. Forehoe (1)
27. Freebridge Lynn (1)
28. Gaywood North & Central (1)
29. Gaywood South (1)
30. Gorleston (1)
31. Guiltcross (1)
32. Hellesdon (1)
33. Henstead (1)
34. Hethersett (1)
35. Hingham (1)
36. Holt (1)
37. Hoveton (1)
38. King's Lynn North & Central (1)
39. Lakenham (1)
40. Launditch (1)
41. Loddon (1)
42. Long Stratton (1)
43. Lothingland (1)
44. Magdalen (1)
45. Mancroft (1)
46. Marshland North (1)
47. Marshland South (1)
48. Mile Cross (1)
49. Nar & Wissey Valleys (1)
50. Nelson (1)
51. North Caister & Ormesby (1)
52. North Coast (1)
53. North Walsham East (1)
54. North Walsham West & Mundesley (1)
55. Old Catton (1)
56. Reepham (1)
57. Sewell (1)
58. Sheringham (1)
59. South Caister & Bure (1)
60. Sprowston (1)
61. Stalham (1)
62. Swaffham (1)
63. Taverham (1)
64. The Brecks (1)
65. The Fleggs (1)
66. Thetford East (1)
67. Thetford West (1)
68. Thorpe Hamlet (1)
69. Thorpe St Andrew (1)
70. Town Close (1)
71. University (1)
72. Watlington & The Fens (1)
73. Watton (1)
74. Waveney Valley (1)
75. Wells (1)
76. Wensum (1)
77. West Depwade (1)
78. Woodside (1)
79. Wroxham (1)
80. Wymondham (1)
81. Yare & Necton (1)
82. Yare Valley (1)
83. Yarmouth Nelson & Southtown (1)
84. Yarmouth North & Central (1)

== District councils ==
=== Breckland ===
Breckland District Wards from 1 April 1974 (Note: first election 7 June 1973) to 3 May 1979:

Wards from 3 May 1979 to 1 May 2003:

Wards from 1 May 2003 to 7 May 2015:

1. All Saints (1)
2. Buckenham (1)
3. Burgh & Haverscroft (2)
4. Conifer (1)
5. Dereham-Central (2)
6. Dereham-Humbletoft (1)
7. Dereham-Neatherd (2)
8. Dereham-Toftwood (2)
9. East Guiltcross (1)
10. Eynsford (1)
11. Haggard de Toni (1)
12. Harling & Heathlands (2)
13. Hermitage (1)
14. Launditch (1)
15. Mid Forest (1)
16. Nar Valley (1)
17. Necton (1)
18. Queen's (3)
19. Shipdham (1)
20. Springvale & Scarning (2)
21. Swaffham (3)
22. Swanton Morley (1)
23. Taverner (1)
24. Templar (1)
25. Thetford-Abbey (2)
26. Thetford-Castle (1)
27. Thetford-Guildhall (3)
28. Thetford-Saxon (3)
29. Two Rivers (2)
30. Upper Wensum (1)
31. Upper Yare (1)
32. Watton (3)
33. Wayland (1)
34. Weeting (1)
35. West Guiltcross (1)
36. Wissey (1)

Wards from 7 May 2015 to present:

1. All Saints & Wayland (2)
2. Ashill (1)
3. Bedingfeld (1)
4. Attleborough Burgh & Haverscroft (2)
5. Attleborough Queens & Besthorpe (3)
6. Dereham Neatherd (3)
7. Dereham Toftwood (2)
8. Dereham Withburga (2)
9. Forest (2)
10. Guiltcross (1)
11. Harling & Heathlands (1)
12. Hermitage (1)
13. Launditch (1)
14. Lincoln (2)
15. Mattishall (2)
16. Nar Valley (1)
17. Necton (1)
18. Saham Toney (2)
19. Shipdham-with-Scarning (2)
20. Swaffham (3)
21. The Buckenhams & Banham (1)
22. Thetford Boudica (2)
23. Thetford Burrell (2)
24. Thetford Castle (2)
25. Thetford Priory (2)
26. Upper Wensum (2)
27. Watton (3)

=== Broadland ===
Broadland District Wards from 1 April 1974 to 3 May 1979:

Wards from 3 May 1979 to 10 June 2004:

Wards from 10 June 2004 to present:

1. Acle (1)
2. Aylsham (3)
3. Blofield with South Walsham (2)
4. Brundall (2)
5. Burlingham (1)
6. Buxton (1)
7. Coltishall (1)
8. Drayton North (1)
9. Drayton South (1)
10. Eynesford (1)
11. Great Witchingham (1)
12. Hellesdon North West (2)
13. Hellesdon South East (2)
14. Hevingham (1)
15. Horsford & Felthorpe (2)
16. Marshes (1)
17. Old Catton & Sprowston West (3)
18. Plumstead (1)
19. Reepham (1)
20. Spixworth with St Faiths (2)
21. Sprowston Central (2)
22. Sprowston East (3)
23. Taverham North (2)
24. Taverham South (2)
25. Thorpe St Andrew North West (3)
26. Thorpe St Andrew South East (3)
27. Wroxham (2)

=== Great Yarmouth ===
Borough of Great Yarmouth wards from 1 April 1974 to 1 May 1980:

Wards from 1 May 1980 to 10 June 2004:

Wards from 10 June 2004 to present:

1. Bradwell North (3)
2. Bradwell South & Hopton (3)
3. Caister North (2)
4. Caister South (2)
5. Central & Northgate (3)
6. Claydon (3)
7. East Flegg (2)
8. Fleggburgh (1)
9. Gorleston (2)
10. Lothingland (2)
11. Magdalen (3)
12. Nelson (3)
13. Ormesby (2)
14. St Andrews (2)
15. Southtown & Cobholm (2)
16. West Flegg (2)
17. Yarmouth North (2)

=== King's Lynn and West Norfolk ===
Wards from 1 April 1974 to 5 May 1983:

Wards from 5 May 1983 to 1 May 2003:

Wards from 1 May 2003 to 2 May 2019:

1. Airfield (2)
2. Brancaster (1)
3. Burnham (1)
4. Clenchwarton (1)
5. Denton (3)
6. Dersingham (2)
7. Docking (1)
8. Downham Old Town (1)
9. East Downham (1)
10. Emneth with Outwell (2)
11. Fairstead (2)
12. Gayton (1)
13. Gaywood Chase (2)
14. Gaywood North Bank (3) †
15. Grimston (1)
16. Heacham (2)
17. Hilgay with Denver (1)
18. Hunstanton (3)
19. Mershe Lande (1)
20. North Downham (1)
21. North Lynn (2)
22. North Wootton (1) †
23. Old Gaywood (1)
24. Rudham (1)
25. Priory (1)
26. St Lawrence (1)
27. St Margarets with St Nicholas (2)
28. Snettisham (2)
29. South & West Lynn (2)
30. South Downham (1)
31. South Wootton (2) †
32. Spellowfields (2) †
33. Springwood (1)
34. Upwell & Delph (2)
35. Valley Hill (1)
36. Walpole (1) †
37. Walton (1)
38. Watlington (1)
39. West Winch (2)
40. Wiggenhall (1)
41. Wimbotsham with Fincham (1)
42. Wissey (1)

† minor boundary changes in 2015

Wards from 2 May 2019 to present:

1. Airfield (2)
2. Bircham with Rudhams (1)
3. Brancaster (1)
4. Burnham Market & Docking (1)
5. Clenchwarton (1)
6. Denver (1)
7. Dersingham (2)
8. Downham Old Town (1)
9. East Downham (1)
10. Emneth & Outwell (2)
11. Fairstead (2)
12. Feltwell (2)
13. Gayton & Grimston (2)
14. Gaywood Chase (1)
15. Gaywood Clock (1)
16. Gaywood North Bank (3)
17. Heacham (2)
18. Hunstanton (2)
19. Massingham with Castle Acre (1)
20. Methwold (1)
21. North Downham (1)
22. North Lynn (2)
23. Snettisham (1)
24. South & West Lynn (2)
25. South Downham (1)
26. Springwood (1)
27. St Margaret's with St Nicholas (2)
28. Terrington (2)
29. The Woottons (3)
30. Tilney, Mershe Lande & Wiggenhall (2)
31. Upwell & Delph (2)
32. Walsoken, West Walton & Walpole (2)
33. Watlington (1)
34. West Winch (2)
35. Wissey (1)

=== North Norfolk ===
Wards from 1 April 1974 to 3 May 1979:

Wards from 3 May 1979 to 1 May 2003:

Wards from 1 May 2003 to 2 May 2019:

1. Astley (1)
2. Briston (1)
3. Chaucer (1)
4. Corpusty (1)
5. Cromer Town (2)
6. Erpingham (1)
7. Glaven Valley (1)
8. Gaunt (1)
9. Happisburgh (1)
10. High Heath (1)
11. Holt (2)
12. Hoveton (1)
13. Lancaster North (2)
14. Lancaster South (2)
15. Mundesley (2)
16. North Walsham East (2)
17. North Walsham North (2)
18. North Walsham West (2)
19. Poppyland (1)
20. Priory (2)
21. Roughton (1)
22. Scottow (1)
23. Sheringham North (2)
24. Sheringham South (2)
25. St Benet (1)
26. Stalham & Sutton (2)
27. Suffield Park (2)
28. The Raynhams (1)
29. The Runtons (1)
30. Walsingham (1)
31. Waterside (2)
32. Waxham (1)
33. Wensum (1)
34. Worstead (1)

Wards from 2 May 2019 to present:

1. Bacton (1)
2. Beeston Regis & The Runtons (1)
3. Briston (1)
4. Coastal (1)
5. Cromer Town (2)
6. Erpingham (1)
7. Gresham (1)
8. Happisburgh (1)
9. Hickling (1)
10. Holt (2)
11. Hoveton & Tunstead (2)
12. Lancaster North (1)
13. Lancaster South (2)
14. Mundesley (1)
15. North Walsham East (2)
16. North Walsham Market Cross (1)
17. North Walsham West (2)
18. Poppyland (1)
19. Priory (1)
20. Roughton (1)
21. Sheringham North (1)
22. Sheringham South (2)
23. Stalham (2)
24. St Benet's (1)
25. Stibbard (1)
26. Stody (1)
27. Suffield Park (1)
28. The Raynhams (1)
29. Trunch (1)
30. Walsingham (1)
31. Wells with Holkham (1)
32. Worstead (1)

=== Norwich ===
Wards from 1 April 1974 to 3 May 1979:

Wards from 3 May 1979 to 10 June 2004:

Wards from 10 June 2004 to 2 May 2019:

1. Bowthorpe (3)
2. Catton Grove (3)
3. Crome (3)
4. Eaton (3)
5. Lakenham (3)
6. Mancroft (3)
7. Mile Cross (3)
8. Nelson (3)
9. Sewell (3)
10. Thorpe Hamlet (3)
11. Town Close (3)
12. University (3)
13. Wensum (3)

Wards from 2 May 2019 to present:

1. Bowthorpe (3)
2. Catton Grove (3)
3. Crome (3)
4. Eaton (3)
5. Lakenham (3)
6. Mancroft (3)
7. Mile Cross (3)
8. Nelson (3)
9. Sewell (3)
10. Thorpe Hamlet (3)
11. Town Close (3)
12. University (3)
13. Wensum (3)

=== South Norfolk ===
Wards from 1 April 1974 to 3 May 1979:

Wards from 3 May 1979 to 1 May 2003:

Wards from 1 May 2003 to 2 May 2019:

1. Abbey (1)
2. Beck Vale (1) †
3. Bressingham & Burston (1) †
4. Brooke (1)
5. Bunwell (1)
6. Chedgrave & Thurton (1) †
7. Cringleford (2) †
8. Cromwells (1) †
9. Dickleburgh (1)
10. Diss (3) †
11. Ditchingham & Broome (1)
12. Earsham (1) †
13. Easton (1)
14. Forncett (1)
15. Gillingham (1) †
16. Harleston (2) †
17. Hempnall (1)
18. Hethersett (2) †
19. Hingham & Deopham (1)
20. Loddon (1) †
21. Mulbarton (2) †
22. New Costessey (2)
23. Newton Flotman (1)
24. Northfields (1)
25. Old Costessey (2)
26. Poringland with the Framinghams (2)
27. Rockland (1)
28. Roydon (1) †
29. Rustens (1)
30. Scole (1)
31. Stoke Holy Cross (1)
32. Stratton (2)
33. Tasburgh (1)
34. Thurlton (1)
35. Town (1)
36. Wicklewood (1)

† minor boundary changes in 2007

Wards from 2 May 2019 to present:

1. Beck Vale, Dickleburgh & Scole (2)
2. Bressingham & Burston (1)
3. Brooke (1)
4. Bunwell (1)
5. Central Wymondham (2)
6. Cringleford (2)
7. Diss & Roydon (3)
8. Ditchingham & Earsham (2)
9. Easton (1)
10. Forncett (1)
11. Harleston (2)
12. Hempnall (1)
13. Hethersett (3)
14. Hingham & Deopham (1)
15. Loddon & Chedgrave (2)
16. Mulbarton & Stoke Holy Cross (3)
17. New Costessey (2)
18. Newton Flotman (1)
19. North Wymondham (2)
20. Old Costessey (3)
21. Poringland, Framinghams & Trowse (3)
22. Rockland (1)
23. South Wymondham (2)
24. Stratton (2)
25. Thurlton (1)
26. Wicklewood (1)

== Electoral wards by constituency ==
Wards as they existed on 1 December 2020.

=== Broadland and Fakenham ===
Broadland: Acle; Aylsham; Blofield with South Walsham; Brundall; Burlingham; Buxton; Coltishall; Eynesford; Great Witchingham; Hevingham; Horsford & Felthorpe; Marshes; Plumstead; Reepham; Spixworth with St. Faiths; Taverham North; Taverham South; Wroxham.

North Norfolk: Lancaster North; Lancaster South; Stibbard; The Raynhams; Walsingham.

=== Great Yarmouth ===
Great Yarmouth: Bradwell North; Bradwell South & Hopton; Caister North; Caister South; Central & Northgate; Claydon; East Flegg; Fleggburgh; Gorleston; Lothingland; Magdalen; Nelson; Ormesby; St Andrews; Southtown & Cobholm; West Flegg; Yarmouth North.

=== Mid Norfolk ===
Breckland: All Saints & Wayland; Attleborough Burgh & Haverscroft; Attleborough Queens & Besthorpe; Dereham Neatherd; Dereham Toftwood; Dereham Withburga; Hermitage; Launditch; Lincoln; Mattishall; Necton; Saham Toney; Shipdham-with-Scarning; The Buckenhams & Banham; Upper Wensum; Watton.

South Norfolk: Hingham & Deopham; Wicklewood.

=== North Norfolk ===
North Norfolk: Bacton; Beeston Regis & The Runtons; Briston; Coastal; Cromer Town; Erpingham; Gresham; Happisburgh; Hickling; Holt; Hoveton & Tunstead; Mundesley; North Walsham East; North Walsham Market Cross; North Walsham West; Poppyland; Priory; Roughton; St. Benet’s; Sheringham North; Sheringham South; Stalham; Stody; Suffield Park; Trunch; Wells with Holkham; Worstead.

=== North West Norfolk ===
King's Lynn and West Norfolk: Bircham with Rudhams; Brancaster; Burnham Market & Docking; Clenchwarton; Dersingham; Fairstead; Gayton & Grimston; Gaywood Chase; Gaywood Clock; Gaywood North Bank; Heacham; Hunstanton; Massingham with Castle Acre; North Lynn; St. Margaret’s with St. Nicholas; Snettisham; South & West Lynn; Springwood; Terrington; The Woottons; Walsoken, West Walton & Walpole; West Winch.

=== Norwich North ===
Broadland: Drayton North; Drayton South; Hellesdon North West; Hellesdon South East; Old Catton & Sprowston West; Sprowston Central; Sprowston East; Thorpe St. Andrew North West; Thorpe St. Andrew South East.

Norwich: Catton Grove; Crome; Mile Cross; Sewell.

=== Norwich South ===
Norwich: Bowthorpe; Eaton; Lakenham; Mancroft; Nelson; Thorpe Hamlet; Town Close; University; Wensum.

South Norfolk: New Costessey.

=== South Norfolk ===
South Norfolk: Brooke; Central Wymondham; Cringleford; Easton; Forncett; Hempnall; Hethersett; Loddon & Chedgrave; Mulbarton & Stoke Holy Cross; Newton Flotman; North Wymondham; Old Costessey; Poringland, Framinghams & Trowse; Rockland; South Wymondham; Stratton; Thurlton.

=== South West Norfolk ===
Breckland: Ashill; Bedingfeld; Forest; Guiltcross; Harling & Heathlands; Nar Valley; Swaffham; Thetford Boudica; Thetford Burrell; Thetford Castle; Thetford Priory.

King's Lynn and West Norfolk: Airfield; Denver; Downham Old Town; East Downham; Emneth & Outwell; Feltwell; Methwold; North Downham; South Downham; Tilney, Mershe Lande & Wiggenhall; Upwell & Delph; Watlington; Wissey.

=== Waveney Valley (part) ===
South Norfolk: Beck Vale, Dickleburgh & Scole; Bressingham & Burston; Bunwell; Diss & Roydon; Ditchingham & Earsham; Harleston.

== See also ==
- List of parliamentary constituencies in Norfolk
