= Up the Line to Death =

Up The Line To Death: The War Poets 1914–1918
- A copy of the first edition cover
- Editor: Gardner, Brian
- Language: English
- Subject: World War I
- Genre: Poetry anthology
- Published: London
- Publisher: Methuen Publishing
- Publication date: 1964

Up The Line To Death: The War Poets 1914–1918 is a poetry anthology edited by Brian Gardner, and first published in 1964. It was a thematic collection of the poetry of World War I.

A significant revisiting of the tradition of the war poet, writing in English, was backed up by strong biographical research on the poets included. Those were mainly British and Irish combatants of World War I; but there are also Australian, Canadian and American poets. The poems are arranged roughly in chronological order, from the start of the war to the end. Some contemporary poems by major poets not involved in the fighting are also given. The title of the anthology comes from the Siegfried Sassoon poem 'Base Details'.

== Poets in Up The Line To Death ==
Richard Aldington - Martin Armstrong - Herbert Asquith - Maurice Baring - Leonard Barnes - Paul Bewsher - Laurence Binyon - John Peale Bishop - Edmund Blunden - Rupert Brooke - Leslie Coulson - E. E. Cummings - Jeffery Day - Geoffrey Dearmer - John Drinkwater - Lord Dunsany - J. Griffyth Fairfax - Gilbert Frankau - John Freeman - Crosbie Garstin - Wilfrid Gibson - Robert Graves - Julian Grenfell - Wyn Griffith - Thomas Hardy - F. W. Harvey - A. P. Herbert - W. N. Hodgson - A. E. Housman - Philip Johnstone - David Jones - T. M. Kettle - Rudyard Kipling - Francis Ledwidge - P. H. B. Lyon - D. S. MacColl - John McCrae - Patrick MacGill - E. A. Mackintosh - R. B. Marriott-Watson - A. A. Milne - Harold Monro - Sir Henry Newbolt - Robert Nichols - Wilfred Owen - Nowell Oxland - Robert Palmer - Max Plowman - Herbert Read - Edgell Rickword - Isaac Rosenberg - Siegfried Sassoon - R. H. Sauter - Alan Seeger - Robert W. Service - Edward Shanks - Patrick Shaw-Stewart - Osbert Sitwell - C. H. Sorley - Edward de Stein - Edward Tennant - Edward Thomas - Edward Thompson - W. J. Turner - R. E. Vernède - Alec Waugh - Willoughby Weaving - I. A. Williams - T. P. Cameron Wilson - W. B. Yeats - E. Hilton Young - Francis Brett Young
