= 1918 Mid Norfolk by-election =

UK Parliamentary by-election

The 1918 Mid Norfolk by-election was held on 23 October 1918. The by-election was held due to the death of the incumbent Liberal Unionist MP, William Lewis Boyle. It was won by the Conservative candidate Neville Jodrell, who was unopposed due to a War-time electoral truce.
