= Copthorne Preparatory School =

Coordinates: 51°8′20.68″N 0°5′56.73″W

Location
- Effingham Lane; Near Copthorne, Surrey, RH10 3HR; England

Information
- Type: Preparatory School
- Motto: Pervincet Vivida Virtus (Lively manliness conquers all)
- Established: 1902
- Local authority: Surrey
- Department for Education URN: 125406 Tables
- Headmistress: Kylie McGregor
- Gender: Mixed
- Age: 2 to 13
- Enrollment: c. 300
- Houses: Newton, Rendall, Sale and Workman
- Colours: Red and Black
- Founder: Bernard Rendall
- School Years: Preschool - Y8
- Website: www.copthorneprep.co.uk

Copthorne Preparatory School is an independent preparatory school for children aged between two and eleven near Copthorne in West Sussex, but just over the county boundary in Surrey.

Copthorne School has some 55 acres (220,000 m^{2}) of playing fields and woodland. It is owned by an educational trust and is a member of the Caterham family of schools, affiliated with Caterham School. It has a nursery school for infants from the age of 2½, a junior department for children under the age of eight (from Reception to Year 2), and a main school for those aged eight to eleven .

== Buildings ==
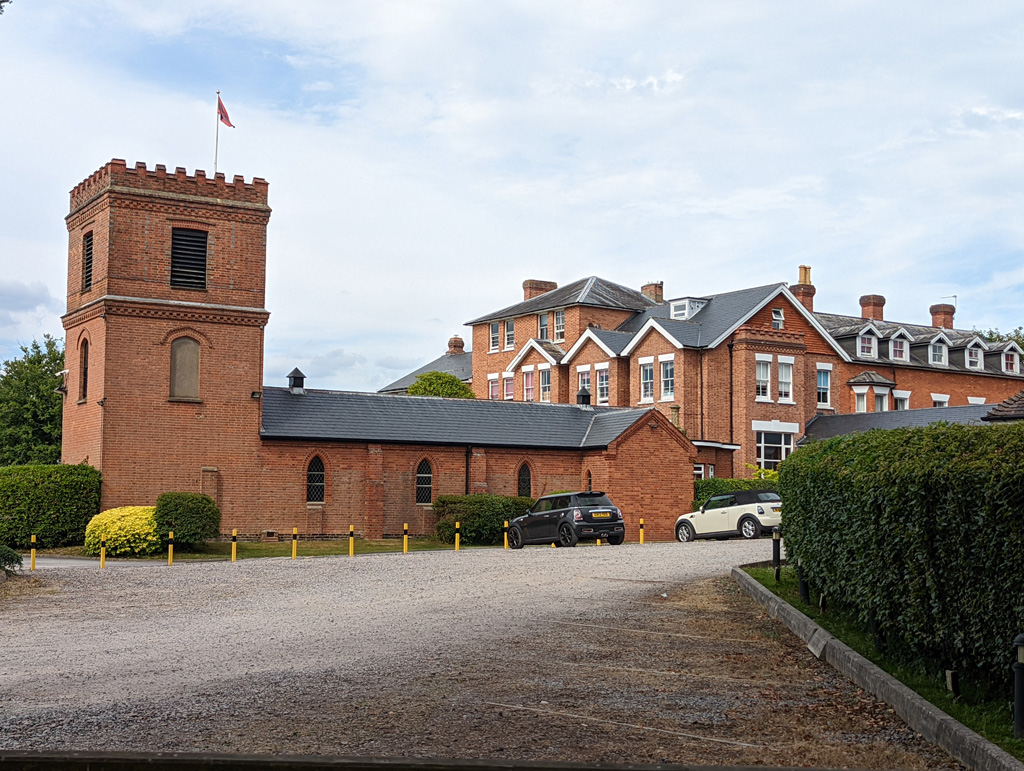
The Chapel and Old Block

The main building, or 'Old Block', is largely taken up by dormitories and sleeping quarters for staff, but it also has the school's dining room, a music room, a theatre, and some classrooms. The 'New Block' is the main teaching building.

== History ==
The 'Old Block' of Copthorne Preparatory School began as a private English country house called Emsworth House and in the 19th century was owned by a family called Kensington. In 1900, it became a small girls' school. In 1902, after that had closed, Bernard Rendall, a brother of Montague Rendall, then the Second Master of Winchester College, founded the present school with a view to preparing boys for Winchester.

The Rendalls had a brother-in-law, Dr Edward Wilson, one of the men who died in 1913 while on Robert Falcon Scott's polar expedition, and Wilson used Copthorne School to prepare for his trip, with the boys giving money to provide huskies. A stained glass window in the school chapel commemorates him.

The school motto, Pervincet Vivida Virtus (Lively manliness conquers all) may be inspired by the lines of the Swiss writer Henricus Loritus Glareanus (1488–1563), in his poem Ad Erasmum Roterodamum -

At longe tua me probitas, tua vivida virtus
Vincit, et est versu non bene picta meo.

In 1928, Edward Skeete Workman took over the running of the school in partnership with J.P. Howard. Tim Workman took over as Headmaster in 1952 on the death of his father and was later joined as joint Headmaster by David Sale. Then Sale was joint Headmaster with David Cann and then with David Newton. Sale died in 1984, David Newton was the sole Headmaster until his retirement in 1999, then was followed by Charles Allen who was Headmaster for six years. The present head, Kylie McGregor was appointed in 2025.

During the Second World War, the school was evacuated to the Lee Bay Hotel in Ilfracombe. Its home was requisitioned for use by the Army (the Buffs had it for six weeks) and then by the Royal Air Force.

In 1976 the school was formed into a charitable trust, and in 1980 girls were admitted for the first time. A Pre-Prep school was started in the late 1970s.

A Nursery was opened in 1997. The school is now predominantly a day school, although some children board weekly and others flexi-board.

== Notable former pupils ==
See also Category:People educated at Copthorne Preparatory School

Former pupils of the school, known as Old Copthornians, include:

- Derek Abbott (born 1960), scientist and engineer
- Charles Brutton (1899–1964), soldier, Clerk of the peace, and cricketer
- Charles Graves (born 1899), author
- Robert Graves (born 1895), poet, novelist
- Richard Perceval Graves (born 1945), biographer, poet
- Stuart Head, Great Britain and England field hockey international
- Sir Adrian Holman (1895–1974), diplomat
- Rory Knight-Bruce, author, journalist
- Dennis Price, actor
- Frederic Raphael (born 1931), author
- Edward Sanders, actor
- Oliver Stewart, First World War flying ace
- Sir John Stanley, Conservative member of parliament
- Crispian Steele-Perkins, classical trumpet player
- Derek Tangye, author
- Francis Wheen (born 1957), journalist

== Notable former staff ==
- Sarah Kennedy, radio and television presenter who was matron at the school for a time
