= Rita Shell =

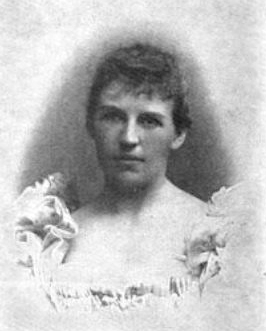
- Photo in The Sketch, 1896
- Born: Henrietta Shell; 1863 England
- Died: 8 November 1950 (aged 86–87)
- Occupation: Magazine editor
- Genre: Women
- Notable works: The Lady
- Partner: Thomas Gibson Bowles
- Children: 4, including Oliver Stewart

Rita Shell (née, Henrietta Shell; in private life, Mrs. John Stewart; nickname, Tello; 1863–1950) was a British magazine editor. She began her journalism career with The Princess, a penny weekly, and in 1895, she was appointed the first woman editor of The Lady, a position she held until her retirement in 1925. Under her leadership, The Lady focused on practical subjects such as home decoration, household management, and cooking, often featuring legal advice and handling a mass of reader correspondence.

== Career ==
While serving as the governess to his children, Shell (nickname "Tello") was the mistress of Thomas Gibson Bowles after the death of his wife Jessica Gordon. According to his granddaughter, Julia Budworth, Bowles fathered the last three of Shell's four children. The children were Humphrey (b. 1891), Oliver (b. 1895), and Peter (b. 1900). Shell changed her surname to Stewart.

Shell's journalism career commenced with the Princess, a penny weekly for women, where she did a variety of work. It was published by Bowles. In 1894, she assisted the editor of Bowles' magazine The Lady. In January 1895, she became the first woman editor of The Lady, serving in that role till 1925, when she retired. From the time of Shell's appointment, no men served as editor of the publication until Matt Warren was appointed in January 2012.

With Shell as its editor, The Lady took up a very practical side, aiming to help its readers as much as possible. Thus, it devoted considerable space to home decoration, household management and cooking, going into each subject very thoroughly. These features in their turn brought in a mass of correspondence. Shell believed that few ladies' papers had more queries to answer. The Lady was alone in devoting one column to giving legal advice. She wrote little for the paper itself, except when away for a holiday. But she saw every single item that went in the paper; no item appeared in the paper to which Shell did not give personal attention.

She was also involved with the Society of Women Journalists, serving as its vice-president.

== Death ==
Shell died in England on 8 November 1950, at the age of 87.
