= Bertram Gurdon, 2nd Baron Cranworth =

British peer and soldier

Bertram Gurdon, 2nd Baron Cranworth KG MC
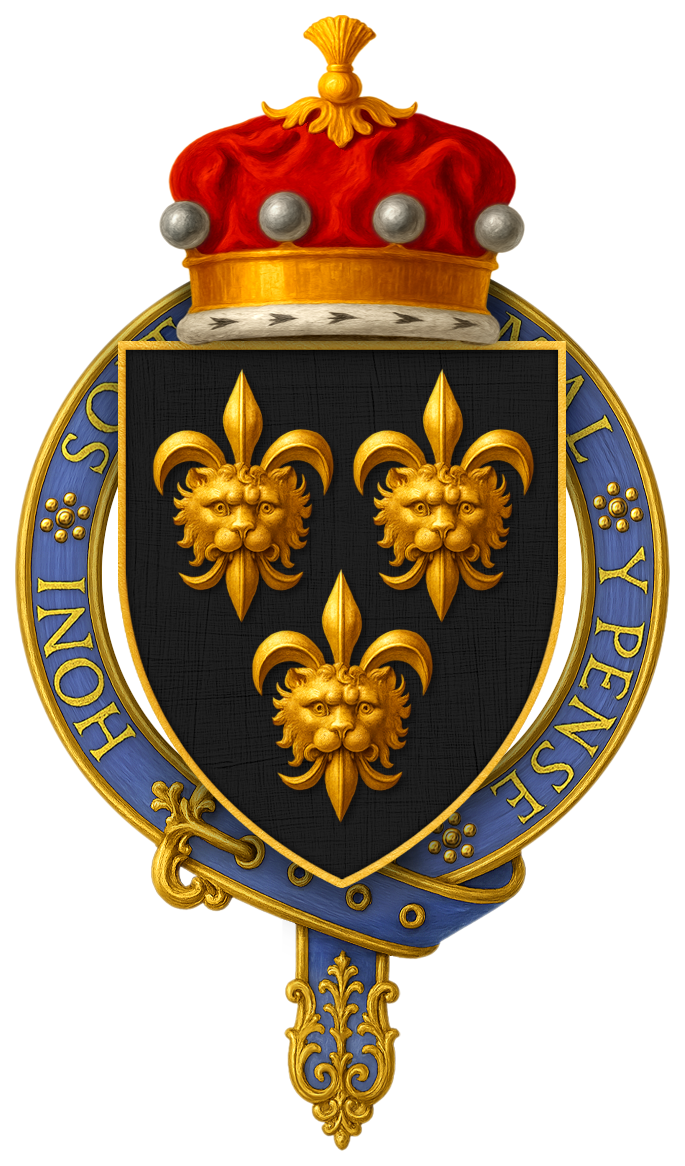
- Born: 13 June 1877
- Died: 4 January 1964 (aged 86)
- Offices: Baron Cranworth
- Spouse: Vera Ridley (m. 1903)
- Issue: Robert
- Father: Robert Gurdon, 1st Baron Cranworth
- Mother: Emily Frances Heathcote
- Military career
- Allegiance: United Kingdom
- Branch: Militia
- Service years: 1900–1948
- Rank: Honorary Colonel
- Unit: 358th (Suffolk) Medium Regiment
- Conflicts: Second Boer War

Bertram Francis Gurdon, 2nd Baron Cranworth (13 June 1877 – 4 January 1964) was a British peer and soldier.

Gurdon was the eldest son of Robert Gurdon, 1st Baron Cranworth and was educated at Trinity College, Cambridge.

He was commissioned a second lieutenant in the Norfolk Artillery Militia on 7 March 1900, and volunteered for active service in the Second Boer War in South Africa. He was promoted to lieutenant on 25 August 1900. Two years into the war, he was wounded, but was discharged from hospital to duty in May 1902, shortly before the end of hostilities. He left Cape Town on board the SS Walmer Castle the following month, and arrived at Southampton in early July. He inherited his father's title in October 1902 and later became a captain.

On 18 July 1903, he married Vera Ridley (a cousin of Matthew Ridley, 1st Viscount Ridley). In 1937, he was appointed Honorary Colonel of the 358th (Suffolk) Medium Regiment and on retiring in 1948, was made a Knight of the Garter. Lord Cranworth died in 1964 and his title passed to his grandson, Philip (his only son Robert having been killed in action in Libya in 1942).

He wrote A Colony in the Making, or Sport and Profit in British East Africa (1912; 2nd edition 1919) and Kenya Chronicles (1939).

== Arms ==
Coat of arms of Bertram Gurdon, 2nd Baron Cranworth
Crest A goat climbing up a rock with sprigs issuant therefrom all Proper. Escutcheon Sable three leopards' faces jessant-de-lis Or. Supporters On either side a goat Proper gorged with a collar gemel Or and standing on a rock also Proper. Motto In Arduis Viget Virtus

Military offices
Preceded by H. Jolly	Honorary Colonel of the 358th (Suffolk) Medium Regiment; 1937–1948	Succeeded by Henry Corry
Peerage of the United Kingdom
Preceded by Robert Gurdon	Baron Cranworth; 1902–1964	Succeeded by Philip Gurdon
