= Baron Cranworth =

Title in the Peerage of the United Kingdom

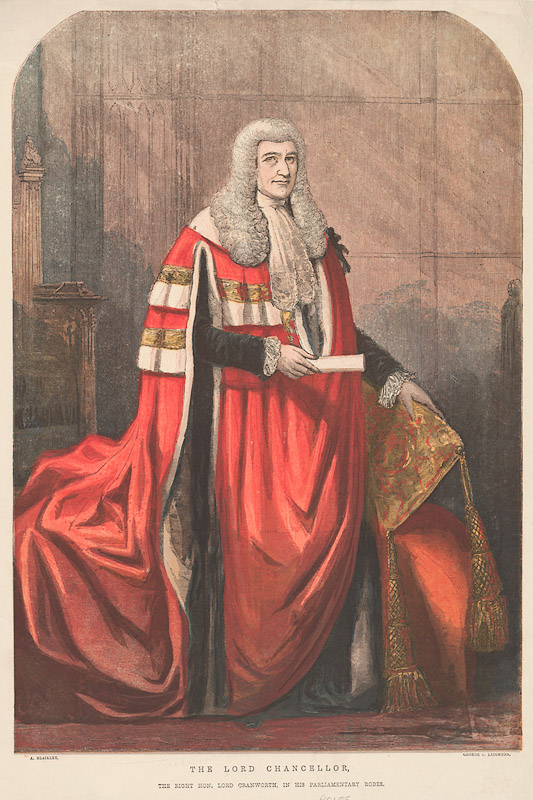
Robert Rolfe, 1st Baron Cranworth

Baron Cranworth is a title that has been created twice, both times in the Peerage of the United Kingdom. The first creation came in 1850 when the lawyer and Liberal politician Sir Robert Rolfe was made Baron Cranworth, of Cranworth in the County of Norfolk. He later served as Lord High Chancellor of Great Britain. This creation became extinct on his death in 1868.

The second creation came in 1899 when Robert Gurdon was created Baron Cranworth, of Letton and Cranworth in the County of Norfolk. He had earlier represented South Norfolk and Mid Norfolk in the House of Commons. As of 2017 the title is held by his great-grandson, the third Baron, who succeeded his grandfather in 1964. He is the son of the Hon. Robert Brampton Gurdon, who was killed in action in Libya in July 1942.

The family seat is Grundisburgh Hall, near Woodbridge, Suffolk.

== Barons Cranworth, First creation (1850) ==
- Robert Monsey Rolfe, 1st Baron Cranworth (1790–1868)

== Barons Cranworth, Second creation (1899) ==
- Robert Thornhagh Gurdon, 1st Baron Cranworth (1829–1902)
- Bertram Francis Gurdon, 2nd Baron Cranworth (1877–1964)
- Philip Bertram Gurdon, 3rd Baron Cranworth (b. 1940)

The heir apparent is the present holder's son the Hon. Sacha William Robin Gurdon (b. 1970).
The heir apparent's heir apparent is his son Alec Martin Philip Gurdon (b. 2006)

Coat of arms of the Barons Cranworth (1899)
Crest A goat climbing up a rock with sprigs issuant therefrom all Proper. Escutcheon Sable three leopards' faces jessant-de-lis Or. Supporters On either side a goat Proper gorged with a collar gemel Or and standing on a rock also Proper. Motto In Arduis Viget Virtus
