= Oliver Stewart =

- Born: 26 November 1896; London, England
- Died: 1976 (aged 79–80)
- Military career
- Allegiance: United Kingdom
- Branch: Aviation
- Rank: Major
- Nickname: Stewpot
- Units: Middlesex Regiment, No. 22 Squadron RFC, No. 54 Squadron RFC
- Awards: Military Cross, Air Force Cross
- Other work: Aviation journalist and author

Major Oliver Stewart MC AFC (1896–1976) was a World War I flying ace credited with five aerial victories. Post war, he had a long and distinguished career as a writer. His parents were Thomas Gibson Bowles and Rita Shell.

== Early life ==
Stewart was educated at Copthorne School, Bradfield College, and the Royal College of Music.

== First World War ==
Stewart was commissioned as a second lieutenant into the Middlesex Regiment in October 1914. He transferred to the Royal Flying Corps in 1915. After a brief time with 22 Squadron, he moved on in 1917 to 54 Squadron to fly a Sopwith Pup. He gained a flight commandership, a nickname (Stewpot), five victories, and a Military Cross while with the squadron. The victories came between 6 April and 25 September 1917; the MC came on 17 September.

He then returned to England, was promoted to major in June 1918, and given command of the Aeroplane and Armament Experimental Establishment. He received an Air Force Cross for his efforts.

== Post war ==
He retired from service in 1921, to begin a new career as an aviation journalist. From 1939 through 1962, he was the editor of Aeronautics magazine. His books included Aerobatics: A Simple Explanation of Aerial Evolutions, Of Flight and Flyers, and his autobiography, Words and Music of a Mechanical Man.
