= William Lewis Boyle =

British politician

William Lewis Boyle (27 May 1859 – 2 October 1918) was Liberal Unionist MP for Mid Norfolk. He was the grandson of Vice-Admiral Sir Courtenay Boyle.

The four times he stood in the constituency it was a straight fight between the Liberals and the Liberal Unionists.

He stood unsuccessfully in 1900 and 1906, and won in the two general elections of 1910.

Boyle joined the Conservative Party when it merged with the Liberal Unionists in 1912. He died in office; the resulting by-election had only one candidate because of the wartime truce.

== Sources ==
- Leigh Rayment's historical list of MPs
- F.W.S. Craig British Parliamentary Election Results 1885-1918
- Whitaker's Almanack 1901 to 1919 editions

Parliament of the United Kingdom
Preceded by Lord Wodehouse	Member of Parliament for Mid Norfolk; 1910–1918	Succeeded by Neville Jodrell
