= Dorothy Jewson =

British teacher, trade union organiser and Labour Party politician

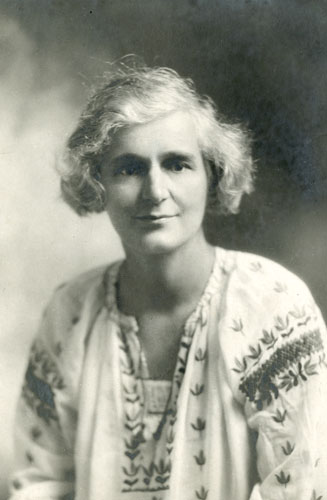

Member of Parliament for Norwich
- In office 6 December 1923 – 28 October 1924 Serving with Walter Robert Smith
- Preceded by: George Henry Roberts
- Succeeded by: James Griffyth Fairfax

Personal details
- Born: 17 August 1884 Norwich
- Died: 29 February 1964 (aged 79)
- Party: Labour
- Spouse(s): R. Tanner Smith (m. 1936; died 1939) Campbell Stephen (m. 1945; died 1947)
- Education: Girton College, Cambridge

Dorothea Jewson (17 August 1884 – 29 February 1964), better known as Dorothy Jewson, was a British teacher, trade union organiser, Labour Party politician, and one of her party's first female Members of Parliament. Whilst at Girton College, Cambridge, she joined socialist organisations including the Independent Labour Party, and went on to campaign for Women's Suffrage in Norwich. She became the "Chief Organiser" of the women's section of National Union of General Workers, before leaving to work as a housemaid at a London hotel, investigating the working conditions there.

In 1923, she was elected as Member of Parliament in one of Norwich's two seats, one of the earliest Labour women to do so. After causing some initial controversy by not wearing a hat to Parliament, she gave her maiden speech in support of reducing the age of suffrage for women from 30 to 21, to match that of men. She was also a member of committees looking into legal aid and adoption. She lost her seat in the 1924 general election, and went on to become president of the Women's Birth Control Group, then a councillor in Norwich City Council, where she ensured the building many of Norwich's parks.

== Early life ==
Dorothea Jewson was born on 17 August 1884 in Thorpe Hamlet to Alderman George Jewson and Mary Jane Jewson. Her sister, Violet, went on to become a doctor in the Norwich area. George Jewson's family had established a business in timber mills, Jewson, which would go on to be a well known builders merchant chain. Jewson was educated at Norwich High School for Girls before going on to Cheltenham Ladies' College and finally completing Classical Tripos at Girton College, Cambridge in 1907. Whilst at university, she joined the Fabian Society and the Independent Labour Party, two socialist organisations.

== Early career ==
After completing her degree, Jewson achieved a teaching qualification from Cambridge Training College for Women in 1908, then returned to Norwich to teach. With her brother, she carried out a large-scale investigation into poverty in the city. It was published as The Destitute of Norwich and how they Live: a Report into the Administration of out Relief in 1912. In 1914 she put up the £200 surety for Miriam Pratt who was a suffragette and arsonist before she was sentenced to 18 months.

During the first world war, Jewson managed a centre focused on training unemployed girls up to the age of 17, and by 1916, she had joined the National Federation of Women Workers as an organiser. In 1919, she had become the secretary of that society and in this role, she attempted to act as an advocate in court, though the judge did not allow it as she had not been appointed as King's Counsel.

By 1922, Jewson had become a vocal speaker on the rights of employed women and was the "chief organiser" of the women's section of the "National Union of General Workers". Over the next year, she left the role in the union and spent a period working as a housemaid in a high end London hotel to experience the working conditions there. She explained that the hotel had "... telephones in every room, pile carpets and marble pillars everywhere [for the guests] but the servants quarters were filthy, miserable and loathsome.". She shared a mice infested room on the tenth floor with four other housemaids, and ate cold, stale, leftover food from the guests in the windowless basement. Working hours were between six in the morning and nine in the evening, with a break from five to seven in the evening and the wage was 15 shillings per week (worth approximately £145 in 2018) (Note: Comparing average earnings between 1922 and 2018, 15 shillings is valued at approximately £145.40 by MeasuringWorth.com)

== Political career ==
At the December 1923 general election, she was elected as one of the two Members of Parliament (MP) for Norwich. In doing so, she became one of the first three women — Margaret Bondfield and Susan Lawrence were the others — to be elected as Labour MPs. When Parliament re-opened on 6 January 1924, Jewson arrived early to ensure she had a seat, but she and Bondfield caused some controversy by not wearing a hat. A few days later, Christine Murrell hosted a dinner for the ladies who had been elected as MPs and discussion turned to the hats. While, Nancy Astor made light of the topic, Jewson was clear that the women were "not in Parliament to discuss dress or millinery, but to do something" and then carried on attending without a hat.

At the end of January 1924, during a train strike, Jewson refused to use the strikebreaking trains to travel back to her constituency in Norwich. The press reported on how she would "walk" the 115 miles back. In reality, she and another trade union official hitched rides on brick cart, a brewer's lorry and a furniture van. They also used buses and trains once the strike was over. In February, 1924, Jewson and Mabel Philipson became the first women to sit on the Parliamentary Kitchen Committee.

On 29 February, Jewson joined William Adamson in putting forward a motion to reduce the age that women could vote from 30 to 21, the same age as men. Estimates at the time suggested that this proposal would have meant half a million more women than men on the electoral register, and that 70% of wage earning women at the time were currently unable to vote. Jewson's speech on the matter was her first in Parliament, and she went on to act as a teller for the vote alongside the Duchess of Atholl, the first time women had done so. The vote was returned at 288 to 72, paving the way for Representation of the People (Equal Franchise) Act 1928.

Jewson was appointed as part of committee to look at problems with Child Adoption and another to look into ensuring that the poor could access legal advice. She also broadcast talks on the radio, such as "Psychology and Domestic Service".

Despite a campaign over the summer of 1924, focussed on "Faith, Hope and Dorothy", she lost her seat at the 1924 general election, and never returned to Parliament, despite running in 1929 and 1931.

== Later career ==
As she was not re-elected as an MP, Jewson focused her time elsewhere, between 1924 and 1928 she became president of the Worker's Birth Control Group, despite being a single lady. There she argued for birth control information to be given to poor women. Her presidency and outspoken feminist views were given as possible reasons for her lack of election success. Jewson did get elected on a local level and acted as Councillor for Norwich City Council between 1929 and 1936. There, she instigated the building of more parks and roads around Norwich, to increase employment, and she is considered to be an incremental in the creation of many of the parks there today.

When the Labour Party split, she focused on the Independent Labour Party, and during the 1929 part conference, she put forward a resolution that there should be a higher taxation on the rich to pay for a children's allowance. and at the 1930 conference she argued that inheritance tax should be used to "abolish inherited wealth".

== Legacy ==
Jewson's political career was reduced after 1936, when she married Richard Tanner-Smith, a tea merchant who died in 1939. In 1945, she married Campbell Stephen, member of Parliament for Glasgow Camlachie, who died just two years later.

Throughout her career Jewson was considered a firm feminist, whilst in Parliament she was considered unlikely to accept any special treatment of women MPs. She was willing to get involved at the ground level, at one point she stated she "nearly had the clothes torn off her back" due to suffrage activities, which endeared her to the crowds.

In 2018, Norfolk theatre company The Common Lot put on a play All Mouth, No Trousers about "rebel women" which featured Jewson as a character, and in 2019, when it was discovered that just 25 out of 300 blue plaques in Norwich were focussed on women, the group created 8 "unofficial" blue plaques including Jewson. She was also included in a project commemorating suffrage pioneers across the country.

== Notes ==
Parliament of the United Kingdom
Preceded by Hilton Young; George Henry Roberts	Member of Parliament for Norwich; 1923–1924; With: Walter Robert Smith	Succeeded by Hilton Young; James Griffyth Fairfax
Party political offices
Preceded by Percy F. Pollard	Eastern Division representative on the National Administrative Council of the Independent Labour Party; 1926–1934	Succeeded by George Johnson
