= Holcombe Ingleby =

English solicitor and politician

Holcombe Ingleby (18 March 1854 – 6 August 1926) was an English solicitor and Conservative Party politician. He was mayor of the borough of King's Lynn in Norfolk, and for eight years a Member of Parliament (MP) for King's Lynn.

Born on 18 March 1854, he was the son of the distinguished Shakespearian scholar, Clement Mansfield Ingleby (1823–1886) and his wife, Sarah Oakes (d. 3 January 1906), of whom he contributed an interesting memoir to the Dictionary of National Biography. Ingleby died 6 August 1926 at Sedgeford Hall, Norfolk, at the age of 72.

From his father — originally a Birmingham man who settled near Ilford, in Essex — Holcombe Ingleby inherited everything except the ill health which interfered so much with the elder Ingleby's work; he had wealth for instance, some antiquarian tastes, much musical knowledge, and a fine voice. He went up to Corpus Christi College, Oxford, and took honours in History. After entering at Inner Temple, he changed his mind and was admitted a solicitor, practising for several years in London. The title of his firm was Ingleby and Royds, which afterwards became Royds, Rawstorne, and Co.

His marriage in 1886 to Harriett Jane Neville Rolfe, daughter of C. F. Neville Rolfe, of Heacham Hall, took him to Norfolk and King's Lynn. There he passed most of the remaining years of his life throwing himself into the affairs of the ancient borough. One of his most lasting legacies is the Royal West Norfolk Golf Club, opened in 1892, whose course he laid out.

He became Mayor of King's Lynn in 1909, and again from 1919 to 1922. He had desired that office, partly because he was fond of the place and people and a born administrator, but also for the sentimental reason that his wife's ancestors had held it 200 years before. In 1919 and 1923 he edited the Red Register of King's Lynn, described in The Times as "a collection of records of no little importance for students of social life and organization in England during the 14th and 15th centuries." At the December 1910 general election he stood as Conservative candidate for the borough, and defeated the former member, the energetic and independent Thomas Gibson Bowles by a majority of 97.

What followed caused some scandal and much amusement. Three humble voters confessedly backed by more powerful people, lodged an election petition against the new member on the ground that he and his agents had been guilty of bribery and corruption. The case was tried at King's Lynn before Mr Justice Ridley and Mr Justice Channell, and the hearing lasted several days, reports being eagerly read all over the country. Ingleby had undoubtedly been the most lavish of entertainers. At his house, Sedgeford Hall, a few miles away, he had habitually received vast parties of guests, providing them with "pageants and carnivals," not to speak of refreshments, the attendance numbering 7,000 in 1905 and 3,000 in 1909. At that time he was not a Parliamentary candidate, but something of the kind went on after he became one, while presents of game were abundant. In giving evidence, the Liberal agent declared that rabbits had been scattered among the voters; he confessed that he himself had accepted a couple of wild duck. In the end, the Judges decided that the festivals and gifts had not been corruptly provided, and Ingleby was declared duly elected, and held the seat till 1918.

It was not only in Norfolk, where he was High Sheriff in 1923, that Ingleby was popular. The House of Commons liked him for geniality and common sense; at the Carlton Club, at Boodle's, and at The Athenæum he was always welcome. In his Treasures of Lynn, a short history of the town of King's Lynn Ingleby demonstrated his racist antipathy to Jews, writing of "the increasing power of the Jews and their doubtful value in our Anglo-Saxon community, having regard to the fact that they do none of the spade-work, but take a large share of the wealth which that spade-work helps to create".

Parliament of the United Kingdom
Preceded by Thomas Gibson Bowles	Member of Parliament for King's Lynn; December 1910 – 1918	Succeeded by Neville Jodrell
