= Frederick William Wilson =

British politician

Wilson in 1897

Wilson in 1895

Frederick William Wilson (26 March 1844 – 26 May 1924), was a British Liberal Party politician and newspaper owner.

== Background ==
He was the second son of William Wilson, Manor House, Scarning, Norfolk and Elisa Turner, of Old Puckenham, Norfolk. He was educated at Wymondham Grammar School. He married in 1870, Mary Elizabeth Cappes of Forest Hill.

== Business career ==
He was a farmer of his own land in Norfolk. He was called up as a volunteer to defend Chester Castle against the Fenians in 1866, 29 years after, meeting one of the attacking party as a colleague in the House of Commons. He was indentured to J. H. Tillett, editor of the Norfolk News and MP for Norwich, 1868–80. He subsequently was assistant to Sir Edward Russell on the Liverpool Daily Post. He founded the East Anglian Daily Times in 1874. He was President of the Newspaper Society of the United Kingdom in 1894, and President of the Institute of Journalists in 1907.

== Political career ==
He was a justice of the peace for Suffolk. DL for Norfolk. He sat as Liberal MP for Norfolk Mid from 1895 to 1906. He first stood unsuccessfully in April 1895 before gaining the seat in July 1895;

General election 1895 Norfolk Mid Electorate
Party	Candidate	Votes	%	±%
Liberal	Frederick William Wilson			
Liberal Unionist	Robert Gurdon			
Majority				
Turnout				
Liberal gain from Liberal Unionist		Swing		

In 1897 session he rode in the Parliamentary steeplechase, and played chess for the House of Commons of the United Kingdom against the United States House of Representatives. He was one of the founders of the Norfolk Small Holdings Association, and took great interest in all movements calculated to keep the villager in the village. He retired at the general election of January 1906. He did not stand for parliament again.

== Sources ==
- Who Was Who
- British parliamentary election results 1885–1918, Craig, F. W. S.

Parliament of the United Kingdom
Preceded by Robert Gurdon	Member of Parliament for Norfolk Mid; 1895–January 1906	Succeeded by John Wodehouse
