= Robert Gurdon, 1st Baron Cranworth =

British Member of Parliament

Robert Thornhagh Gurdon, 1st Baron Cranworth, DL (18 June 1829 – 13 October 1902) was a British Member of Parliament.

Gurdon was the eldest son of Brampton Gurdon (1797–1881), of Letton Hall in Norfolk and of Grundisburgh Hall in Suffolk, who was a Liberal Party Member of Parliament from Norfolk. His mother Henrietta Susanna Ridley-Colborne (1810–1880) was the daughter of Lord Colborne, another Member of Parliament.

He was educated at Eton and Trinity College, Cambridge, and was called to the Bar at Lincoln's Inn in 1856. His early career saw him practicing on the Northern Circuit. Gurdon was elected to the House of Commons for South Norfolk as a Liberal in 1880, after having tried unsuccessfully in the elections of 1871 and 1874. He held the seat until 1885, when he was returned for Mid Norfolk. In 1886, he split with the Liberal leader William Ewart Gladstone over Irish Home Rule, and joined the Liberal Unionists. Gurdon continued to represent Mid Norfolk until 1892, and then again briefly in 1895. He was chairman of the Norfolk County Council from its institution and until early 1902, when he resigned due to ill health. He was also chairman of quarter sessions, an honorary colonel of the 4th Volunteer battalion, Norfolk Regiment, and a deputy lieutenant and justice of the peace for Norfolk.

In 1899 he was raised to the peerage as Baron Cranworth, of Letton and Cranworth in the County of Norfolk.

Lord Cranworth married firstly, in 1862, Harriott Ellin Miles, daughter of Sir William Miles, 1st Baronet, and they had a daughter, Amy Harriott Gurden, in 1864. After her death in childbirth in 1864 he married secondly, in 1874, Emily Frances Heathcote, daughter of Robert Boothby Heathcote.

Lord Cranworth died aged 73 at his residence Letton Hall, near Thetford, on 13 October 1902, and was succeeded in the barony by his son from his second marriage Bertram Francis Gurdon. Lady Cranworth died in 1934.

== Arms ==
Coat of arms of Robert Gurdon, 1st Baron Cranworth
Crest A goat climbing up a rock with sprigs issuant therefrom all Proper. Escutcheon Sable three leopards' faces jessant-de-lis Or. Supporters On either side a goat Proper gorged with a collar gemel Or and standing on a rock also Proper. Motto In Arduis Viget Virtus

Parliament of the United Kingdom
Preceded by Clare Sewell Read; Sir Robert Jacob Buxton	Member of Parliament for South Norfolk; 1880–1885; With: Sir Robert Jacob Buxton	Succeeded by Francis Taylor
New constituency	Member of Parliament for Mid Norfolk; 1885–1892	Succeeded by Clement Higgins
Preceded by Clement Higgins	Member of Parliament for Mid Norfolk; April 1895 – July 1895	Succeeded by Frederick William Wilson
Peerage of the United Kingdom
New creation	Baron Cranworth; 1899–1902	Succeeded by Bertram Francis Gurdon
