= J. Griffyth Fairfax =

British politician

- Born: James Griffyth Fairfax; 15 July 1886; Sydney, New South Wales, Australia
- Died: 27 January 1976 (aged 89); France
- Education: Winchester School; New College, Oxford
- Occupations: poet; translator; politician
- Parents: Charles Burton Fairfax (father); Florence Fairfax (née Frazer) (mother)
- Relatives: Sir James Reading Fairfax (grandfather); John Fairfax (great-grandfather)

Member of Parliament for Norwich
- In office 29 October 1924 – 30 May 1929 Serving with Hilton Young
- Preceded by: Dorothy Jewson; Walter Robert Smith
- Succeeded by: Walter Robert Smith; Geoffrey Shakespeare

Personal details
- Party: Conservative and Unionist Party
- Military career
- Allegiance: United Kingdom
- Branch: British Army
- Rank: Captain
- Unit: Royal Army Service Corps
- Commands: 15th Indian Division
- War: World War I

James Griffyth Fairfax (15 July 1886 – 27 January 1976) was a British poet, translator, and politician.

== Biography ==
Fairfax, a great-grandson of the Australian newspaper tycoon John Fairfax, was a member of the Fairfax family, and was educated at Winchester School and New College, Oxford. Fairfax departed permanently from Australia in 1904.

He served in the 15th Indian Division for the duration of the First World War, and rose to the rank of captain in the Army Service Corps.

His first volume of poetry was published in 1906. He was also active in literary circles and had an influence on and was influenced by his friend Ezra Pound.

Married Rosetta Mary Glover, 10 October 1922 at St Paul's Church, Knightsbridge the daughter of Captain Sir John Hawley Glover.

Fairfax was a Member of the UK House of Commons representing the borough constituency of Norwich for the Conservative and Unionist Party from the 1924 election until the 1929 election.

== Published works ==
- Fairfax, J. G.; University of California Libraries (1914). The horns of Taurus. London: Smith, Elder & Co.
- Fairbairn, J. V.; Fairfax, J. G. (1960). Civil aviation in Australia. Canberra: Canberra Pub. Co.

=== Poetry ===
- Fairfax, J. G. (1906). The Gates of Sleep and other poems. London: Elkin Mathews, Vigo Street.
- Fairfax, J. G. (1919). Mesopotamia: sonnets and lyrics at home and abroad, 1914-1919. London: John Murray.
- Billington, William John, ed. (1921). Catalogue of the war poetry collection presented by and anonymous donor in memory of Private William John Billington. Birmingham Public Libraries.
- Fairfax, J. G. (1937) The Fifth Element. London: John Murray.
- Gardner, Brian, ed. (1964). Up the Line to Death: The War Poets 1914-18. London: Methuen.
- Fairfax, J. G. (2013). "The forest of the dead". In Dapin, Mark (ed.). From the trenches: the best ANZAC writing of World War One. Melbourne, Victoria: Viking. ISBN 978-0-670-07781-6.

Parliament of the United Kingdom
Preceded by Dorothy Jewson; Walter Robert Smith	Member of Parliament for Norwich; 1924–1929; With: Hilton Young	Succeeded by Walter Robert Smith; Geoffrey Shakespeare
