= Jerome Mayhew =

British Conservative politician (born 1970)

The Honourable Jerome Mayhew MP
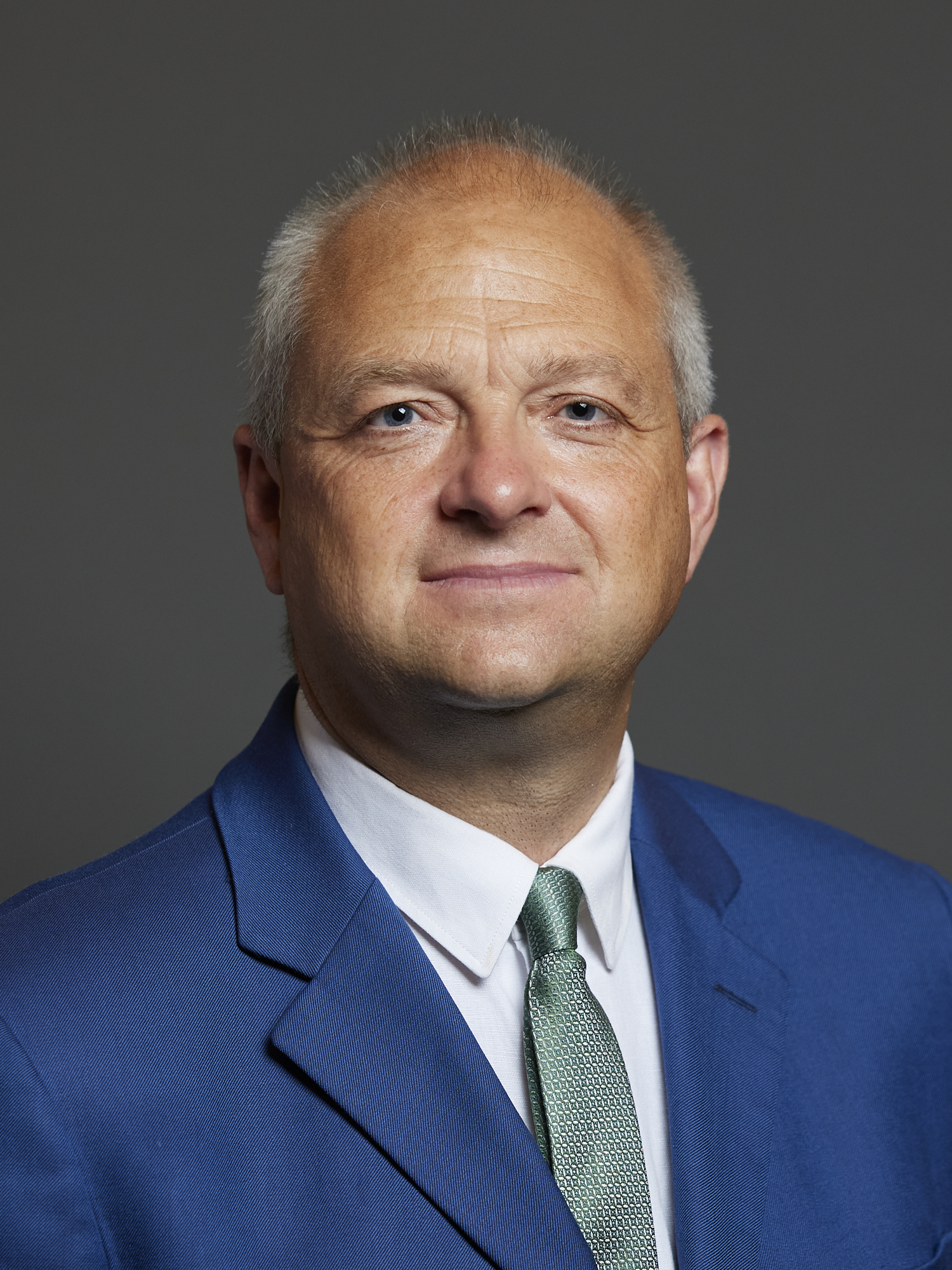
- Official portrait, 2024

Shadow Solicitor General
- Incumbent
- Assumed office 2 September 2026
- Leader: Kemi Badenoch
- Preceded by: Helen Grant

Shadow Minister for Transport
- In office 8 November 2024 – 1 September 2026
- Leader: Kemi Badenoch
- Preceded by: Alec Shelbrooke
- Succeeded by: Greg Smith

Opposition Whip
- In office 20 November 2024 – 1 September 2026
- Leader: Kemi Badenoch

Shadow Minister for Business and Trade
- In office 20 July 2024 – 6 November 2024
- Leader: Rishi Sunak

Member of Parliament for Broadland and Fakenham
- Incumbent
- Assumed office 12 December 2019
- Preceded by: Keith Simpson
- Majority: 719 (1.4%)

Personal details
- Party: Conservative
- Relations: Patrick Mayhew (father)
- Education: University of Edinburgh; Cranfield University
- Occupation: Politician
- Website: www.jeromemayhew.org.uk

Jerome Patrick Burke Mayhew is a British Conservative Party politician who has been the Member of Parliament (MP) for Broadland and Fakenham since 2019. He has served as Shadow Solicitor General since September 2026.

== Early life and career ==
Jerome Mayhew is the son of Patrick Mayhew (latterly Baron Mayhew of Twysden), a former Conservative cabinet minister, and the Reverend Jean Elizabeth Mayhew OBE. He was privately educated at Tonbridge School, and then studied at University of Edinburgh (where he received an MA Hons) and Cranfield University. He was called to the Bar at Middle Temple in 1995, and until 2006 worked in practice as a barrister, based at 1 Temple Gardens.

He was a director of the Go Ape (Adventure Forest Ltd) adventure park company from 2006 to 2009, and its managing director from 2009 to 2018.

== Parliamentary career ==
Mayhew was selected as the Conservative candidate for Broadland in November 2019. At the 2019 general election, Mayhew was elected to Parliament as MP for Broadland with 59.6% of the vote and a majority of 21,861.

Mayhew is a member of the Environmental Audit Committee, and was elected to it in 2020. He supports the use of offshore wind farms in East Anglia. In reference to the wind projects Norfolk Vanguard and Norfolk Boreas he says, "offshore wind projects like these are essential to ensure that we can maintain a reliable supply chain and job opportunities this project will bring to East Anglia."

In December 2021, plans were submitted for an asylum seeker processing facility to be set up in Broadland which would house up to 200 lone-male asylum seekers while their applications were assessed. Mayhew campaigned against this application on the basis that the site was too remote and unsuitable for asylum seekers. The plans were dropped and the Home Office conceded to their campaign.

In January 2022, Mayhew was appointed to sit as a British Delegate for the Committee on Political Affairs and Democracy on the Council of Europe. Mayhew's work on the Council of Europe has included supporting the expulsion of Russia from the Council in response to their invasion of Ukraine. In March, Mayhew became a member of the Backbench Business Committee and in the July he was appointed as a member to the Public Accounts Commission in Parliament.

In 2023, Mayhew was made Parliamentary Private Secretary (PPS) to Jeremy Hunt, Chancellor of the Exchequer of the United Kingdom.

Mayhew was re-elected as MP for Broadland and Fakenham at the 2024 general election with a decreased vote share of 33.0% and majority of 719.

In the 2026 British shadow cabinet reshuffle, he replaced Helen Grant as Shadow Solicitor General. On 8 September 2026, he was reselected for the next United Kingdom general election.

== Personal life ==
In 2001, Mayhew married Kate Louise; the couple have a son and two daughters. He lists his recreations in Who's Who as sailing and Ireland. He is a member of the South Cork Sailing and Royal Harwich Yacht clubs.

== Electoral history ==
General election 2024: Broadland and Fakenham
Party	Candidate	Votes	%	±%
Conservative	Jerome Mayhew	16,322	33.0	−26.1
Labour	Iain Simpson	15,603	31.5	+9.9
Reform	Eric Masters	8,859	17.9	N/A
Liberal Democrats	Leyla Hannbeck	5,526	11.2	−4.9
Green	Jan Davis	3,203	6.5	+4.0
Majority		719	1.5	−36.0
Turnout		49,513	65.4	−7.0
Registered electors		75,730		
Conservative hold		Swing	−18.0	

General election 2019: Broadland
Party	Candidate	Votes	%	±%
Conservative	Jerome Mayhew	33,934	59.6	+1.7
Labour	Jess Barnard	12,073	21.2	−8.4
Liberal Democrats	Ben Goodwin	9,195	16.1	+8.2
Green	Andrew Boswell	1,412	2.5	+0.8
Majority		21,861	38.4	+10.1
Turnout		56,977	72.9	+0.5
Conservative hold		Swing	+5.1	

Parliament of the United Kingdom
Preceded by Keith Simpson	Member of Parliament for Broadland and Fakenham; 2019–present	Incumbent
