= Thomas Gibson Bowles =

British politician and publisher (1841–1922)

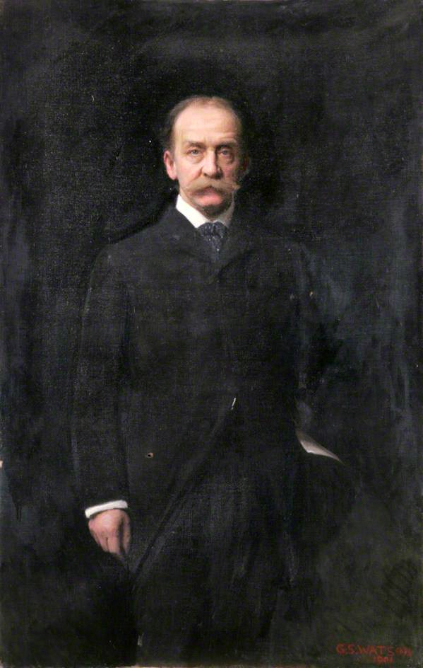
- Portrait of Bowles by George Spencer Watson, 1901

Member of Parliament for King's Lynn
- In office 1910–1910
- Preceded by: Carlyon Bellairs
- Succeeded by: Holcombe Ingleby
- In office 1892–1906
- Preceded by: Weston Jarvis
- Succeeded by: Carlyon Bellairs

Personal details
- Born: 15 January 1841 London, England
- Died: 12 January 1922 (aged 79) Algeciras, Spain
- Party: Conservative
- Spouse: Jessica Evans-Gordon (m. 1875; died 1887)
- Domestic partner: Rita Shell
- Children: 4, including George
- Parent(s): Thomas Milner Gibson; Susannah Bowles
- Education: King's College London

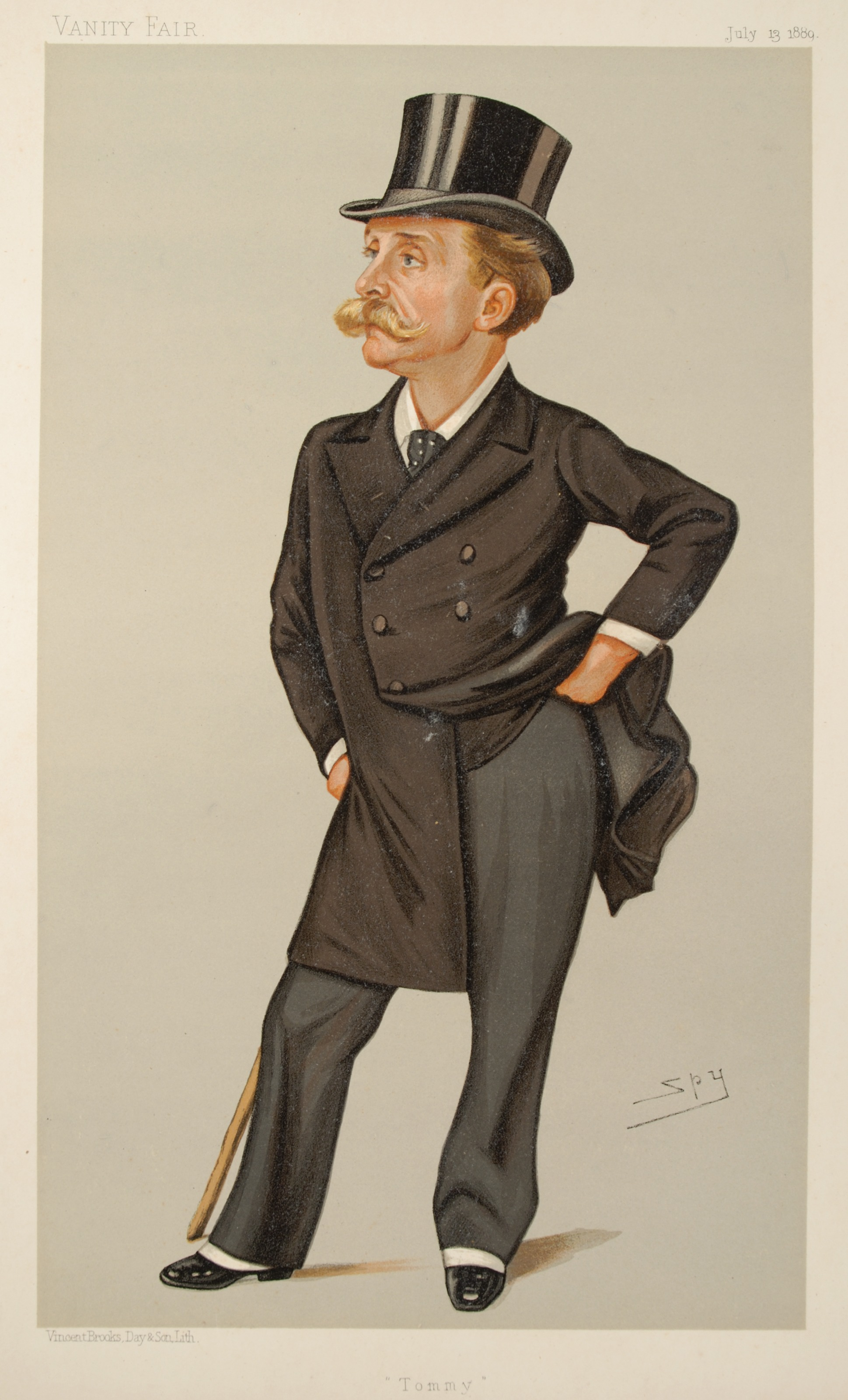
"Tommy". Caricature by Spy published in Vanity Fair in 1889.

Thomas Gibson Bowles (15 January 1841 – 12 January 1922) was a British politician and publisher. He founded the magazines The Lady and Vanity Fair, and became a Member of Parliament in 1892. He was also the maternal grandfather of the Mitford sisters.

== Early life ==
Thomas Gibson Bowles was born in 1841 to Susannah Bowles, being baptised on 10 March 1841 at Christ Church, Spitalfields, London. He was the illegitimate son of the politician Thomas Milner Gibson. He attended school in France and then studied for a year at King's College London. His father gave him a yearly stipend of £90 and helped him find a job at Somerset House.

== Career ==
He began his journalism and publishing career by writing a column for the Morning Post in 1866. His coverage of the Siege of Paris sent by balloon and pigeon post ensured his fame.

He borrowed £200 to found Vanity Fair in 1868. Shattered by the death of his wife Jessica (née Gordon) in childbirth, he sold his stake in Vanity Fair in 1887 for £20,000. He founded The Lady magazine in 1885, supposedly spurred by advice Jessica had once given to him. He became a competent sailor and wrote for decades in support of the Royal Navy. Bowles (nicknamed Jehu Junior after a biblical prophet who effected the downfall of his enemies) compiled the biographical notes that went with the caricatures. He was editor for twenty years and shaped magazine policy so that no-one was exempt from his enquiring eye. This approach made for an entertaining and popular magazine.

The targets of Jehu Junior's satire usually considered themselves honoured to have been chosen, and although the scrutiny was acute, it was humorous rather than malicious. Bowles generally maintained this balance throughout his association with the magazine.

=== Political career ===
At the 1892 general election, he was elected as Conservative Party Member of Parliament for King's Lynn and served in the House of Commons until losing his seat at the 1906 election. He was re-elected at the January 1910 as a Liberal, but lost his seat again at the December 1910 election. He stood in the 1916 Harborough by-election as an independent.

=== Litigation ===
In 1912, Bowles brought (and personally argued) a claim in the High Court against the Bank of England, in which he succeed in establishing that the long-standing practice of informally collecting income tax before the act of Parliament imposing it for the year had been passed was unlawful. This led to the passing of the Provisional Collection of Taxes Act 1913 (3 & 4 Geo. 5. c. 3), which for the first time authorised taxes to be collected on the basis of Budget resolutions passed by the House of Commons (a procedure that remains in place to this day).

== Personal life ==
In 1875, he married Jessica Evans-Gordon (1852–1887), the sister of William Evans-Gordon MP, and daughter of Maj.-Gen. Charles Spalding Evans-Gordon (1813–1901), a descendant of the Lochinvar branch of Clan Gordon, by his wife Catherine Rose, daughter of Rev. Alexander Rose and Janet Mackintosh, of Inverness. Before her death in 1887, they were the parents of:

- George Frederic Stewart Bowles (1877–1955), a barrister and MP who married Madeline Mary Tobin.
- Geoffrey Tatton Bowles (1879–1968), a Commander of the Royal Navy.
- Sydney Bowles (1880–1963), married the Hon. David Mitford (later Lord Redesdale) in 1902, and was the mother of the Mitford sisters.
- Dorothy Jessica Bowles (1885–1971), who married Col. Percy Bailey (son of Sir James Bailey).

He died on 12 January 1922 while on a holiday at Algeciras, Spain, and is buried in Gibraltar.

=== Mitford Descendants ===
Through his elder daughter Sydney, he was a grandfather of Nancy, Pamela, Thomas, Diana, Unity, Jessica, and Deborah Mitford.

=== Relationship with Rita Shell ===
According to his granddaughter Julia Budworth, Bowles also fathered the last three of the four children of assistant Rita Shell (his children's governess, after the death of his wife Jessica Gordon), who changed her surname to Stewart. She later became editor of The Lady. They were Humphrey (b. 1891), Oliver (b. 1895) and Peter (b. 1900). Peter Stewart later assisted at Marlborough House when it was used by Queen Mary.

Parliament of the United Kingdom
Preceded by Weston Jarvis	Member of Parliament for King's Lynn; 1892 – 1906	Succeeded by Carlyon Bellairs
Preceded by Carlyon Bellairs	Member of Parliament for King's Lynn; January 1910 – December 1910	Succeeded by Holcombe Ingleby
