= George Hartland =

British politician (1884–1944)

George Albert Hartland (14 July 1884 – 18 July 1944) was a British Conservative Party politician. He was a member of parliament (MP) for Norwich from 1931 to 1935. He was educated at St. Francis Xavier's College, Liverpool. He served with the Liverpool Scottish during the First World War.

Parliament of the United Kingdom
Preceded by Walter Smith; Geoffrey Shakespeare	Member of Parliament for Norwich; 1931–1935; With: Geoffrey Shakespeare	Succeeded by Henry Strauss; Geoffrey Shakespeare
