= Mid Norfolk =

UK Parliament constituency (1885–1918, 1983 onwards)

Coordinates: 52.47°N 1.71°E

- County constituency for the House of Commons
- Interactive map of boundaries since 2024
- Location within the East of England
- County: Norfolk
- Electorate: 71,060 (March 2020)
- Major settlements: Dereham, Attleborough, Watton

Current constituency
- Created: 1983
- Member of Parliament: George Freeman (Conservative)
- Seats: One
- Created from: Norfolk North, Norfolk South West and Yarmouth

1885–1918
- Seats: One
- Type of constituency: County constituency
- Created from: North Norfolk, South Norfolk and West Norfolk
- Replaced by: South Norfolk and South West Norfolk

Mid Norfolk is a constituency (Note: A county constituency (for the purposes of election expenses and type of returning officer)) represented in the House of Commons of the UK Parliament since 2010 by George Freeman, a Conservative. (Note: As with all constituencies, the constituency elects one Member of Parliament (MP) by the first past the post system of election at least every five years.)

== Constituency profile ==
Mid Norfolk is a constituency in Norfolk. Its largest settlement is the town of Dereham which has a population of around 21,000. Other settlements in the constituency include the towns of Watton, Attleborough and Hingham and the village of Mattishall.

This constituency covers a large rural area west of the city of Norwich and includes many small villages and historic market towns. Much of its industry is based around agriculture and rural business. The constituency has average levels of wealth and deprivation, and house prices are lower than the national and East of England averages.

Residents of the constituency are generally older than average due to the large retiree population, and most are homeowners. They have low levels of education and the rates of household income and child poverty are average. A high proportion of residents work in the manufacturing and construction sectors and a low percentage claim unemployment benefits. White people made up 97% of the population at the 2021 census.

At the local district council level, most of the constituency is represented by Conservative councillors with some Labour Party representatives elected in the west of Dereham. At the county council, which held elections more recently, most of the constituency is represented by Reform UK. Voters in Mid Norfolk strongly supported leaving the European Union in the 2016 referendum; an estimated 62% voted in favour of Brexit compared to the nationwide figure of 52%.

== History ==
Under the Redistribution of Seats Act 1885, the three two-member county divisions of Norfolk were replaced with six single-member divisions, including the newly created Mid Division of Norfolk. It was abolished at the next redistribution of seats under the provisions of the Representation of the People Act 1918, when it was absorbed by neighbouring constituencies.

The seat was re-established as a County Constituency for the 1983 general election, since which it has only elected and been served by a Conservative MP.

The Boundary Commission's Fifth periodic review of Westminster constituencies for the 2010 general election created a new constituency, Broadland, based on the local government district of the same name, which was formed from the majority of the Mid Norfolk seat, together with parts of North Norfolk. The Mid Norfolk seat was retained with substantially altered boundaries, gaining parts of South Norfolk and South West Norfolk in compensation (see below). The former MP for Mid Norfolk, Keith Simpson, was selected to contest the newly created Broadland constituency.

== Boundaries and boundary changes ==
=== Historic ===
==== 1885–1918 ====
- The Sessional Divisions of Forehoes, Guiltcross and Shropham, and Mitford and Launditch.

The constituency was created from parts of the Southern Division of Norfolk and parts of the abolished Eastern Division. The main settlements were East Dereham and Attleborough.

On abolition, southern areas, including Wymondham, were returned to the Southern Division and northern areas, including East Dereham, were transferred to the South-Western Division.

==== 1983–1997 ====
- The District of Breckland wards of Beetley and Gressenhall, East Dereham Neatherd, East Dereham St Withburga, East Dereham Toftwood, East Dereham Town, Eynsford, Hermitage, Launditch, Mattishall, Shipworth, Springvale, Swanton Morley, Taverner, Two Rivers, Upper Wensum, and Upper Yare; and
- The District of Broadland wards of Acle, Aylsham, Blofield, Brundall, Burlingham, Buxton, Cawston, Coltishall, Drayton, Foulsham, Freethorpe, Great Witchingham, Hainford, Hevingham, Horsford, Plumstead, Rackheath, Reedham, Reepham, South Walsham, Spixworth, St Faiths, Taverham, and Wroxham.

Eastern areas were transferred from Yarmouth, central areas (including Aylsham) from North Norfolk and western areas (including East Dereham) from South West Norfolk.

==== 1997–2010 ====
- The District of Breckland wards of Beetley and Gressenhall, East Dereham Neatherd, East Dereham St Withburga, East Dereham Toftwood, East Dereham Town, Eynsford, Hermitage, Launditch, Mattishall, Shipworth, Springvale, Swanton Morley, Taverner, Two Rivers, Upper Wensum, and Upper Yare; and
- The District of Broadland wards of Acle, Aylsham, Blofield, Brundall, Burlingham, Buxton, Cawston, Coltishall, Foulsham, Freethorpe, Great Witchingham, Hainford, Hevingham, Horsford, Plumstead, Rackheath, Reedham, Reepham, South Walsham, Spixworth, St Faiths, and Wroxham.

The District of Broadland wards of Drayton and Taverham were transferred to Norwich North.

Map of boundaries 2010–2024

==== 2010–2024 ====
- The District of Breckland wards of All Saints, Buckenham, Burgh and Haverscroft, Dereham Central, Dereham Humbletoft, Dereham Neatherd, Dereham Toftwood, Eynsford, Haggard De Toni, Hermitage, Launditch, Necton, Queen's, Shipdham, Springvale and Scarning, Swanton Morley, Taverner, Templar, Two Rivers, Upper Wensum, Upper Yare, Watton, and Wissey; and
- The District of South Norfolk wards of Abbey, Cromwells, Hingham and Deopham, Northfields, Rustens, Town, and Wicklewood.

Significant changes. The District of Broadland areas, which had comprised the majority of the constituency, were now included in the new constituency of Broadland. The District of Breckland areas were retained from the 1997–2010 contents, with further parts, including Watton and Attleborough, transferred from South West Norfolk. The District of South Norfolk wards, which incorporated the town of Wymondham, were transferred from the constituency of South Norfolk.

=== Current ===
Further to the 2023 review of Westminster constituencies, which came into effect for the 2024 general election, the composition of the Mid Norfolk constituency is as follows (as they existed on 1 December 2020):

- The District of Breckland wards of: All Saints & Wayland; Attleborough Burgh & Haverscroft; Attleborough Queens & Besthorpe; Dereham Neatherd; Dereham Toftwood; Dereham Withburga; Hermitage; Launditch; Lincoln; Mattishall; Necton; Saham Toney; Shipdham-with-Scarning; The Buckenhams & Banham; Upper Wensum; Watton.
- The District of South Norfolk wards of: Hingham & Deopham; Wicklewood.

The town of Wymondham was transferred back to South Norfolk. Other minor changes due to the revision of local authority ward boundaries.

== Members of Parliament ==
=== MPs 1885–1918 ===
North Norfolk, South Norfolk and West Norfolk prior to 1885

Election	Member	Party	Notes
1885	Robert Gurdon	Liberal	Gurdon was elected as a Liberal, but joined the Liberal Unionists when the party split
1886	Robert Gurdon	Liberal Unionist	Gurdon was elected as a Liberal, but joined the Liberal Unionists when the party split
1892	Clement Higgins	Liberal	Higgins was elected as a Liberal, but later joined the Liberal Unionists. He resigned his seat in 1895
1895	Clement Higgins	Liberal Unionist	Higgins was elected as a Liberal, but later joined the Liberal Unionists. He resigned his seat in 1895
1895 by-election	Robert Gurdon	Liberal Unionist	later Baron Cranworth
1895	Frederick Wilson	Liberal	
1906	John Wodehouse, Lord Wodehouse	Liberal	later 3rd Earl of Kimberley
1910 (Jan)	William Boyle	Liberal Unionist	
1912	William Boyle	Conservative	
1918 by-election	Neville Jodrell	Conservative	Later MP for King's Lynn
1918	Constituency abolished, but re-established 1983		

=== MPs since 1983 ===
Norfolk North, Norfolk South West and Yarmouth prior to 1983

Election	Member	Party
1983	Richard Ryder	Conservative
1997	Keith Simpson	Conservative
2010	George Freeman	Conservative

== Elections ==
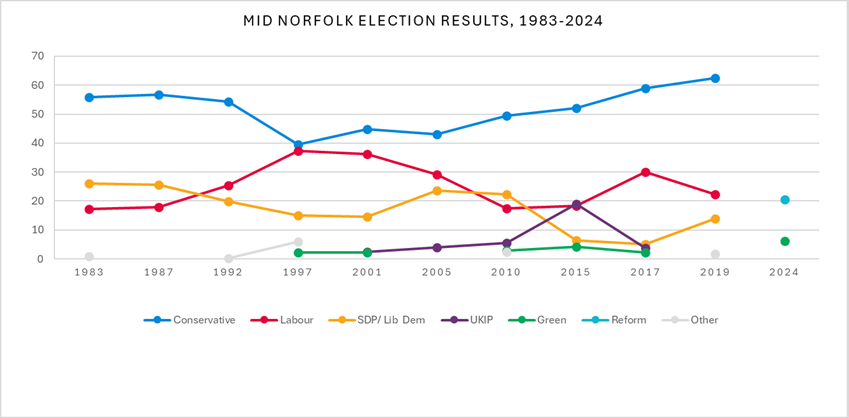
Mid Norfolk election results 1983–2024

=== Elections in the 2020s ===
General election 2024: Mid Norfolk
Party	Candidate	Votes	%	±%
Conservative	George Freeman	16,770	36.5	−27.9
Labour	Michael Rosen (Note: Not to be confused with the children's author of the same name.)	13,716	29.9	+7.0
Reform	Kabeer Kher	9,427	20.5	New
Liberal Democrats	Stuart Howard	3,126	6.8	−3.6
Green	Ash Haynes	2,858	6.2	+5.9
Majority		3,054	6.7	−34.8
Turnout		45,897	61.0	−8.1
Registered electors		75,238		
Conservative hold		Swing	−17.5	

=== Elections in the 2010s ===
2019 notional result
Party	Vote	%
Conservative	31,639	64.4
Labour	11,251	22.9
Liberal Democrats	5,127	10.4
Others	939	1.9
Green	154	0.3
Turnout	49,110	69.1
Electorate	71,060	

General election 2019: Mid Norfolk
Party	Candidate	Votes	%	±%
Conservative	George Freeman	35,051	62.4	+3.4
Labour	Adrian Heald	12,457	22.2	−7.9
Liberal Democrats	Steff Aquarone	7,739	13.8	+8.7
Independent	P O'Gorman	939	1.7	New
Majority		22,594	40.2	+11.3
Turnout		56,186	68.5	−1.1
Conservative hold		Swing	+5.7	

General election 2017: Mid Norfolk
Party	Candidate	Votes	%	±%
Conservative	George Freeman	32,828	59.0	+6.9
Labour	Sarah Simpson	16,742	30.1	+11.7
Liberal Democrats	Fionna Tod	2,848	5.1	−1.2
UKIP	Tracy Knowles	2,092	3.8	−15.2
Green	Hannah Lester	1,158	2.1	−2.1
Majority		16,086	28.9	−4.2
Turnout		55,668	69.6	+1.8
Conservative hold		Swing	−2.4	

General election 2015: Mid Norfolk
Party	Candidate	Votes	%	±%
Conservative	George Freeman	27,206	52.1	+2.6
UKIP	Anna Coke	9,930	19.0	+13.5
Labour	Harry Clarke	9,585	18.4	+1.0
Liberal Democrats	Paul Speed	3,300	6.3	−15.9
Green	Simeon Jackson	2,191	4.2	+1.3
Majority		17,276	33.1	+5.8
Turnout		52,212	67.8	−0.6
Conservative hold		Swing	−5.5	

General election 2010: Mid Norfolk
Party	Candidate	Votes	%	±%
Conservative	George Freeman	25,123	49.5	+2.9
Liberal Democrats	David Newman	11,267	22.2	+3.0
Labour	Elizabeth Hughes	8,857	17.4	−12.8
UKIP	Toby Coke	2,800	5.5	+1.5
Green	Tim Birt	1,457	2.9	New
BNP	Christene Kelly	1,261	2.5	New
Majority		13,856	27.3	+13.5
Turnout		50,765	68.4	+2.8
Conservative hold		Swing	−0.1	

=== Elections in the 2000s ===
General election 2005: Mid Norfolk
Party	Candidate	Votes	%	±%
Conservative	Keith Simpson	23,564	43.1	−1.7
Labour	Daniel Zeichner	16,004	29.2	−6.9
Liberal Democrats	Vivienne Clifford-Jackson	12,988	23.7	+9.2
UKIP	Simon Fletcher	2,178	4.0	+1.5
Majority		7,560	13.8	+5.1
Turnout		54,734	67.0	−1.1
Conservative hold		Swing	+2.6	

General election 2001: Mid Norfolk
Party	Candidate	Votes	%	±%
Conservative	Keith Simpson	23,519	44.8	+5.2
Labour	Daniel Zeichner	18,957	36.1	−1.2
Liberal Democrats	Vivienne Clifford-Jackson	7,621	14.5	−0.5
UKIP	Stuart Agnew	1,333	2.5	New
Green	Peter Reeve	1,118	2.1	0.0
Majority		4,562	8.7	+6.4
Turnout		52,548	68.1	−8.2
Conservative hold		Swing	+3.2	

=== Elections in the 1990s ===
General election 1997: Mid Norfolk
Party	Candidate	Votes	%	±%
Conservative	Keith Simpson	22,739	39.6	−14.7
Labour	Daniel Zeichner	21,403	37.3	+11.9
Liberal Democrats	Susan Frary	8,617	15.0	−4.9
Referendum	Nigel Holder	3,229	5.6	New
Green	Tony Park	1,254	2.1	New
Natural Law	Bruce Parker	215	0.4	New
Majority		1,336	2.3	−26.6
Turnout		57,457	76.3	−5.2
Conservative hold		Swing	−13.3	

General election 1992: Mid Norfolk
Party	Candidate	Votes	%	±%
Conservative	Richard Ryder	35,620	54.3	−2.4
Labour	Michael Castle	16,672	25.4	+7.6
Liberal Democrats	Michael Gleed	13,072	19.9	−5.6
Natural Law	Coral Waite	226	0.3	New
Majority		18,948	28.9	−2.3
Turnout		65,590	81.5	+3.3
Conservative hold		Swing	−5.0	

=== Elections in the 1980s ===
General election 1987: Mid Norfolk
Party	Candidate	Votes	%	±%
Conservative	Richard Ryder	32,758	56.7	+0.8
SDP	Gavin Graham	14,750	25.5	−0.5
Labour	Keith Luckey	10,272	17.8	+0.6
Majority		18,008	31.2	+1.3
Turnout		57,600	78.2	+2.9
Conservative hold		Swing		

General election 1983: Mid Norfolk
Party	Candidate	Votes	%	±%
Conservative	Richard Ryder	29,032	55.9	
SDP	David Cargill	13,517	26.0	
Labour	Leslie Potter	8,950	17.2	
Independent	Mona McNee	405	0.8	
Majority		15,515	29.9	
Turnout		51,904	75.3	
Conservative win (new seat)				

=== Elections in the 1910s ===
1918 Mid Norfolk by-election
Party	Candidate	Votes	%	±%
Unionist	Neville Jodrell	Unopposed		
Unionist hold				

General Election 1914–15:

Another General Election was required to take place before the end of 1915. The political parties had been making preparations for an election to take place and by July 1914, the following candidates had been selected;

- Unionist: William Lewis Boyle
- Liberal: David Waterlow

General election December 1910: Mid Norfolk
Party	Candidate	Votes	%	±%
Liberal Unionist	William Lewis Boyle	4,345	50.2	−2.4
Liberal	William Richard Lester	4,308	49.8	+2.4
Majority		37	0.4	−4.8
Turnout		8,653	86.7	−3.3
Registered electors		9,984		
Liberal Unionist hold		Swing	−2.4	

Lester

General election January 1910: Mid Norfolk
Party	Candidate	Votes	%	±%
Liberal Unionist	William Lewis Boyle	4,724	52.6	+2.8
Liberal	William Richard Lester	4,265	47.4	−2.8
Majority		459	5.2	N/A
Turnout		8,989	90.0	+1.8
Registered electors		9,984		
Liberal Unionist gain from Liberal		Swing	+2.8	

=== Elections in the 1900s ===
Wodehouse

General election 1906: Mid Norfolk
Party	Candidate	Votes	%	±%
Liberal	John Wodehouse	4,197	50.2	−3.7
Liberal Unionist	William Lewis Boyle	4,170	49.8	+3.7
Majority		27	0.4	−7.4
Turnout		8,367	88.2	+7.8
Registered electors		9,490		
Liberal hold		Swing	−3.7	

General election 1900: Mid Norfolk
Party	Candidate	Votes	%	±%
Liberal	Frederick William Wilson	3,996	53.9	+3.1
Liberal Unionist	William Lewis Boyle	3,422	46.1	−3.1
Majority		574	7.8	+6.2
Turnout		7,418	80.4	−6.9
Registered electors		9,226		
Liberal hold		Swing	+3.1	

=== Elections in the 1890s ===
Wilson

General election 1895: Mid Norfolk
Party	Candidate	Votes	%	±%
Liberal	Frederick William Wilson	4,220	50.8	−2.3
Liberal Unionist	Robert Gurdon	4,086	49.2	+2.3
Majority		134	1.6	−4.6
Turnout		8,306	87.3	−1.9
Registered electors		9,509		
Liberal hold		Swing	−2.3	

By-election, 23 Apr 1895: Mid Norfolk
Party	Candidate	Votes	%	±%
Liberal Unionist	Robert Gurdon	4,112	51.3	+4.4
Liberal	Frederick William Wilson	3,904	48.7	−4.4
Majority		208	2.6	N/A
Turnout		8,016	84.3	−4.9
Registered electors		9,509		
Liberal Unionist gain from Liberal		Swing	+4.4	

General election 1892: Mid Norfolk
Party	Candidate	Votes	%	±%
Liberal	Clement Higgins	4,069	53.1	+6.7
Liberal Unionist	Robert Gurdon	3,599	46.9	−6.7
Majority		470	6.2	N/A
Turnout		7,668	89.2	+32.6
Registered electors		8,601		
Liberal gain from Liberal Unionist		Swing	+6.7	

=== Elections in the 1880s ===
General election 1886: Mid Norfolk
Party	Candidate	Votes	%	±%
Liberal Unionist	Robert Gurdon	3,032	53.6	+18.3
Liberal	James Toller	2,625	46.4	−18.3
Majority		407	7.2	N/A
Turnout		5,657	56.6	−24.9
Registered electors		9,992		
Liberal Unionist gain from Liberal		Swing	+18.3	

General election 1885: Mid Norfolk
Party	Candidate	Votes	%	±%
Liberal	Robert Gurdon	5,275	64.7	
Conservative	Ailwyn Fellowes	2,872	35.3	
Majority		2,403	29.4	
Turnout		8,147	81.5	
Registered electors		9,992		
Liberal win (new seat)				

== See also ==
- parliamentary constituencies in Norfolk
- List of parliamentary constituencies in the East of England (region)
