= Keith Simpson (politician) =

British politician

The Right Honourable Keith Simpson PC
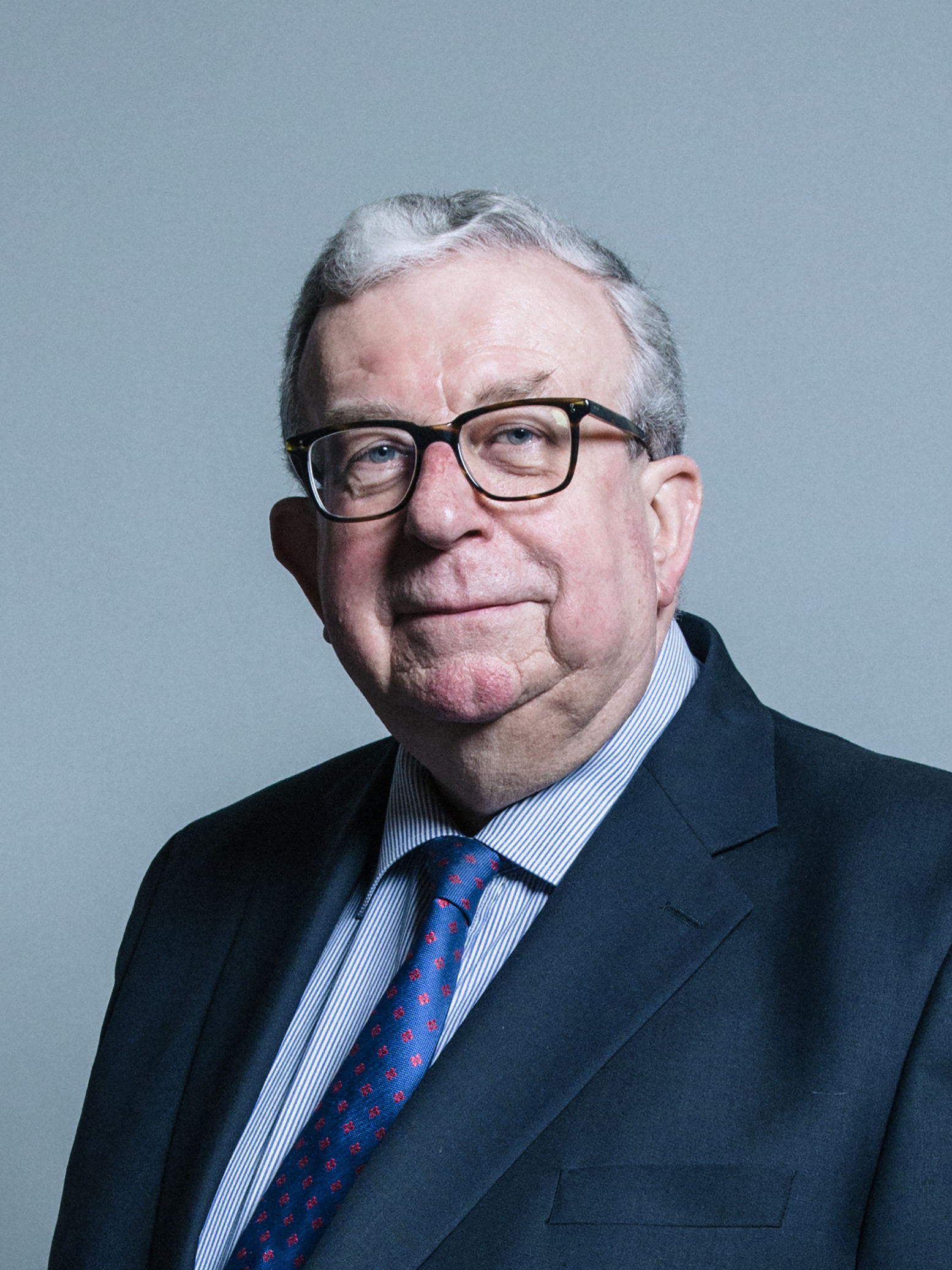
- Official portrait, 2017

Member of Parliament for Broadland
- In office 6 May 2010 – 6 November 2019
- Preceded by: Constituency established
- Succeeded by: Jerome Mayhew

Member of Parliament for Mid Norfolk
- In office 1 May 1997 – 12 April 2010
- Preceded by: Richard Ryder
- Succeeded by: George Freeman

Personal details
- Born: 29 March 1949 (age 77) Norwich, Norfolk, England
- Party: Conservative
- Education: University of Hull; King's College London
- Website: keithsimpson.com

Keith Robert Simpson, PC (born 29 March 1949) is a British Conservative Party politician and military historian who served as Member of Parliament (MP) for Broadland from 2010 to 2019, having previously served as the MP for Mid Norfolk from 1997 to 2010.

== Early life ==
Simpson was born in Norwich, the son of Harry Simpson and Jean Day. He was educated at Thorpe Grammar School (now known as Thorpe St Andrew School), in Thorpe St Andrew, Norfolk. He went on attain a BA in History at the University of Hull, and undertook postgraduate research in War Studies at King's College London, where he completed a PGCE in 1975.

== Political career ==
Simpson served as the National Vice-Chairman of the Federation of Conservative Students from 1972–73.

He was Head of Foreign Affairs and Defence at Conservative Central Office from 1986–88. From 1988–90, he was a Political Adviser to the Secretary of State for Defence (first to George Younger, and then to Tom King).

Simpson was the Conservative Parliamentary candidate for Plymouth Devonport at the 1992 general election, where he lost to the Labour candidate David Jamieson.

At the 1997 general election, Simpson was elected as the Member of Parliament for Mid Norfolk with a majority of 1,336.

In July 1997, Simpson was appointed to the Conservative Parliamentary Defence Committee. In June 1998, he was appointed a frontbench defence spokesman. From June 1999 to June 2001, he was an Opposition Whip responsible for Treasury, Home Affairs and Health. He was subsequently appointed Shadow Agriculture Spokesman in October 2001. From 2002–05, he was Shadow Minister for Defence, and from 2005–10 he served as Shadow Minister for Foreign Affairs.

During its extensive coverage of the United Kingdom parliamentary expenses scandal, The Daily Telegraph published the story that Simpson had claimed £185 for light bulbs over a period of four years.

Following parliamentary boundary changes and prior to the 2010 general election, Simpson's constituency of Mid Norfolk was redrawn. He was selected to stand for the newly created seat of Broadland, which derived from parts of the Mid Norfolk, Norfolk North and Norwich North constituencies. Simpson won the seat with a majority of 7,292.

Following the 2010 general election, Simpson was appointed the Parliamentary Private Secretary to the Foreign Secretary, William Hague, in the Conservative-Liberal Democrat coalition government.

In May 2014 he was one of seven unsuccessful candidates for the chairmanship of the House of Commons Defence Select Committee.

In March 2015, he was appointed to the Privy Council of the United Kingdom and therefore granted the title The Right Honourable.

Simpson was opposed to Brexit prior to the 2016 referendum.

Simpson stood down at the 2019 general election.

== Career outside politics ==
As a military historian, Simpson has served as Director of the Cranfield Security Studies Institute at Cranfield University from 1991–7, and as a Senior Lecturer in War Studies and International Affairs at the Royal Military Academy Sandhurst from 1973–86. He is the author of five books on military history. It was also in this capacity that he was invited to debate masculine violence with a drunken Oliver Reed on an infamous edition of the late night Channel 4 television programme After Dark, broadcast on 26 January 1991. Reed confronted him and called him 'flash boy'.

== Personal life ==
Simpson married Pepita, the daughter of Norman Hollingsworth, on 4 August 1984 at the Royal Memorial Chapel, Sandhurst. The couple currently live in Coltishall, Norfolk, and have one son.

== Bibliography ==
- — (1985). History of the German Army. Military Press. ISBN 978-0-517-45138-0.
- — (1990). Waffen SS. Gallery Books. ISBN 978-0-8317-2673-7.
- — (1993). German War Against Resistance. Penguin Group (USA) Incorporated. ISBN 978-0-670-81052-9.
- Ian F W Beckett; Keith Simpson (2004). A Nation in Arms. Pen and Sword. ISBN 978-1-4738-1662-6.
- — (2015). The Old Contemptibles. Taylor & Francis. ISBN 978-1-317-40411-8.

Parliament of the United Kingdom
Preceded by Richard Ryder	Member of Parliament for Mid Norfolk; 1997–2010	Succeeded by George Freeman
New constituency	Member of Parliament for Broadland; 2010–2019	Succeeded by Jerome Mayhew
