= Walter Smith (British politician) =

British politician (1872–1942)

Walter Robert Smith (7 May 1872 – 25 February 1942) was a Labour Member of Parliament (MP) who represented Wellingborough and Norwich. He was an organiser with the National Union of Boot and Shoe Operatives.

== Early career ==
Smith was president of the Norwich Union of Clickers and Roughstuff Cutters in 1893, and when that organisation was merged in the National Union of Boot and Shoe Operatives in 1894, Smith became the part-time president of the Norwich branch, a position he held until his election as national organiser in 1916. He was member of Norwich City Council and honorary president of the National Union of Agricultural Workers from 1911 to 1923. He also served as president of Norwich Trades Council from 1904 until 1917, and was the first president of the International Landworkers' Federation.

== Political career ==
Smith was the first Labour MP who was elected for Wellingborough. He represented the division from 1918 to 1922. He represented his native city of Norwich in between 1923 and 1924, and again in from 1929 to 1931. In 1924 he was Parliamentary Secretary to the Board of Agriculture and Fisheries in the First MacDonald ministry. The next year he replaced John Stirling-Maxwell as member of the Forestry Commission. In the Second MacDonald ministry Smith was Parliamentary Secretary to the Board of Trade (1929–31). He was chairman of the Labour Party in 1934, and the following year Smith was announced as a member of the newly created Herring Industry Board.

Parliament of the United Kingdom
New constituency	Member of Parliament for Wellingborough; 1918–1922	Succeeded by Geoffrey Shakespeare
Preceded by Hilton Young and George Henry Roberts	Member of Parliament for Norwich; 1923–1924; With: Dorothy Jewson	Succeeded by Hilton Young and J. Griffyth Fairfax
Preceded by Hilton Young and J. Griffyth Fairfax	Member of Parliament for Norwich; 1929–1931; With: Geoffrey Shakespeare	Succeeded by George Hartland and Geoffrey Shakespeare
Party political offices
Preceded by Joseph Compton	Chair of the Labour Party; 1933–1934	Succeeded by William Albert Robinson
Political offices
Preceded by The Earl of Ancaster	Parliamentary Secretary to the Ministry of Agriculture and Fisheries; 1924	Succeeded by The Lord Bledisloe
Trade union offices
Preceded by George Nicholls	President of the National Union of Agricultural Workers; 1911–1923	Succeeded by Bill Holmes
Preceded by John Robertson and Ben Smith	Auditor of the Trades Union Congress; 1920; With: William Straker	Succeeded by David Grenfell and Samuel Lomax
Preceded by New position	President of the International Landworkers' Federation; 1920–1924	Succeeded by Joseph Forbes Duncan
