= Neville Jodrell =

British politician

Sir Neville Paul Jodrell (27 May 1858 – 20 May 1932) was a Conservative Party politician in the United Kingdom.

He was elected as member of parliament (MP) for Mid Norfolk at a by-election in October 1918 following the death of William Lewis Boyle MP.

However, the Mid Norfolk constituency was abolished for the general election in December 1918, and Jodrell was returned to the House of Commons as MP for the King's Lynn constituency, with a majority of only 366 votes over his only opponent, the Labour candidate. He was re-elected in a three-way contest in 1922 by a larger margin, but at the 1923 general election, he lost his seat to the Liberal candidate, George Woodwark.

Jodrell did not stand for Parliament again.

He was knighted in the 1922 Dissolution Honours List.

Parliament of the United Kingdom
Preceded by William Lewis Boyle	Member of Parliament for Mid Norfolk; October 1918 – December 1918	Constituency abolished
Preceded by Holcombe Ingleby	Member of Parliament for King's Lynn; 1918 – 1923	Succeeded by George Woodwark
