= Graham Woodwark =

George Graham Woodwark CBE (1 July 1874 – 26 December 1938) was an English Liberal politician.

== Family and education ==
Born in 1874 in King's Lynn, Norfolk, Woodwark was the son of the Alderman G S Woodwark JP. He was educated at King Edward VII’s Grammar School, King’s Lynn. In 1930 he married Isabel Palmer. He was always known to his family and friends as Graham.

== Career ==
=== Military service ===
Woodwark’s career was almost exclusively one of public service. He served in the armed forces in the First World War. Having been for some years associated with the local Territorials, Woodwark raised and trained battalions in England in the early period of the War. He served in France, 1916–18 and was wounded on the Somme. While in France he gained the Legion of Honour (1917) and was mentioned in despatches in the same year. On discharge from hospital he joined the War Office and was then sent on the British War Mission to America in 1918. He remained in the US for fifteen months, during which period frequently deputised for the British Ambassador, Lord Reading. He retained his connection to the TA reaching the rank of Colonel in the 2/5th Battalion of the Norfolk Regiment, although during his mission to the US and throughout he 1920s he was frequently referred to as Lieutenant-Colonel.

=== Politics ===
==== Beliefs ====
Woodwark was a proponent of the traditional Liberal policy of Free Trade. He seems to have been a supporter of the Conservatives at one point but then associated himself with the Liberals. In 1926 he became Chairman of the Eastern Counties Liberal Federation. However his position is less certain as the crisis surrounding the National Government unfolded. At the 1931 general election Woodwark was publicly supporting the Conservative MP for his home town of King’s Lynn, Lord Fermoy for the National Government on the principle of sound money. This seems to have been as part of a general agreement between Conservatives, Liberals and Liberal Nationals in Norfolk. Woodwark maintained his support for the new National candidate at the 1935 general election, even though a Liberal candidate, Mr F Darvall, was adopted to contest the seat.

==== Local government ====
Woodwark served on King’s Lynn Town Council, of which he was sometime an Alderman. In 1926 and again in 1932 he was Mayor of the town. He was a member of various committees including the Town Planning Committee, and the Elementary Education and War Pensions Committees, both of which he chaired.

==== Parliament ====
Woodwark first stood for Parliament as Liberal candidate for King’s Lynn at the 1922 general election. In a tight three-cornered contest he came third behind the sitting Conservative MP, Neville Jodrell who held the seat and the Labour candidate, R B Walker. At the 1923 general election however in an ever-closer race, Woodwark leapt to the top of the poll to take King’s Lynn by the narrow majority of 677 votes. However he could not hold on in the face of a national Conservative revival in 1924 and lost the seat back to the Tories. He did not stand for election to the House of Commons again.

=== Other appointments ===
Like his father, Woodwark served as a Justice of the Peace and was a member of the Juvenile Panel of Magistrates. He was a member of the King’s Lynn Conservancy Board, the King’s Lynn Docks and Railway Board, and the Eastern Sea Fisheries Committee. He was also a Pilotage Commissioner for The Wash. In pursuing his interest in education, Woodwark was a Governor of King Edward VII’s Grammar School and a Member of the Executive Committee of the Association of Education Committees.

=== Awards ===
Woodwark received his CBE in the New Year Honours of 1920. He was awarded la Croix de Chevalier du Mérite Agricole in 1932 and was made a Grand Officer of the Nichan Iftikhar in 1933. In 1934 he was created an Officer of the Legion of Honour in recognition of his services as an honorary Consular Agent of France and in 1937 he was made Officer in the Order of Orange-Nassau.

== Dogs ==
Woodwark was a keen dog owner and breeder. He exhibited in many shows winning numerous prizes for his wire fox terriers at various venues including Crufts and the Kennel Club. He was also an officer of the Wire Fox Terrier Association, founded in 1913.

== Death ==
Woodwark died at his home, Croylands in King’s Lynn, on the night of 26 December 1938 aged 64.

Parliament of the United Kingdom
Preceded by Sir Neville Paul Jodrell	Member of Parliament for King's Lynn; 1923–1924	Succeeded by Lord Fermoy
