= Clement Higgins =

British politician

Member of Parliament for Mid Norfolk
- In office 4 July 1892 – 3 April 1895
- Preceded by: Robert Gurdon
- Succeeded by: Robert Gurdon

Personal details
- Born: c. 1844
- Died: 4 December 1916
- Party: Liberal

Clement Higgins (c. 1844 – 4 December 1916) was a British Liberal Party politician who served as Member of Parliament for Mid Norfolk in the 25th Parliament between 1892 and 1895.

Higgins was first elected at the 1892 general election.

In February 1895 he joined the Liberal Unionist Party, and resigned his seat in the House of Commons on 3 April 1895.

Parliament of the United Kingdom
Preceded by Robert Gurdon	Member of Parliament for Mid Norfolk; 1892–1895	Succeeded by Robert Gurdon
