= Broadland and Fakenham =

UK Parliament constituency (since 2010)

Coordinates: 52.72°N 1.16°E

- County constituency for the House of Commons
- Interactive map of boundaries since 2024
- Location within the East of England
- County: Norfolk
- Population: 95,188 (2011 census)
- Electorate: 72,907 (March 2020)
- Major settlements: Taverham, Aylsham, Fakenham

Current constituency
- Created: 2010
- Member of Parliament: Jerome Mayhew (Conservative)
- Seats: One
- Created from: Mid Norfolk, North Norfolk and Norwich North

Broadland and Fakenham is a Norfolk constituency, (Note: A county constituency (for the purposes of election expenses and type of returning officer)) which has been represented in the House of Commons of the UK Parliament since the 2019 general election by Jerome Mayhew, a Conservative. (Note: As with all constituencies, the constituency elects one Member of Parliament (MP) by the first past the post system of election at least every five years.)

Although the constituency contained the town of Fakenham when it was created for the 2010 general election, it was formally known as Broadland up until the 2024 general election. Further to the 2023 review of Westminster constituencies, the Boundary Commission for England recommended that it be renamed Broadland and Fakenham.

== Constituency profile ==
The Broadland and Fakenham constituency is located in Norfolk and covers a large rural area to the north of the city of Norwich. It is named after the Broads, an area of navigable rivers and lakes with status equivalent to a national park, which is partly located in the constituency. The largest settlement in the constituency is the affluent village of Taverham on outskirts of Norwich, which has a population of over 10,000. Other settlements include the small market towns of Fakenham, Reepham, Aylsham and Acle. The constituency is mostly agricultural and contains many farms and small villages.

Compared to national averages, residents of the constituency are older and have average levels of wealth and professional employment. White people make up 97% of the population. At the local council level, most parts of the constituency are represented by Conservative and Liberal Democrat councillors, with the Conservatives more popular in the east of the constituency. Most voters in Broadland and Fakenham supported leaving the European Union in the 2016 referendum, with an estimated 55% voting in favour of Brexit.

== History ==
Under the Fifth Periodic Review of Westminster constituencies coming into effect for the 2010 general election, the Boundary Commission for England created the Broadland constituency as the successor seat to Mid Norfolk, which was relocated. It comprised the majority of Mid Norfolk, together with parts of North Norfolk and Norwich North.

Since its creation, the seat has been held by the Conservative Party with comfortable majorities – until 2024, when the majority over the Labour Party was cut to 1.5%.

== Boundaries ==
=== 2010–2024 ===
Map of boundaries 2010–2024

- The District of Broadland wards of Acle, Aylsham, Blofield with South Walsham, Brundall, Burlingham, Buxton, Coltishall, Drayton North, Drayton South, Eynesford, Great Witchingham, Hevingham, Horsford and Felthorpe, Marshes, Plumstead, Reepham, Spixworth with St Faiths, Taverham North, Taverham South, and Wroxham; and
- The District of North Norfolk wards of Astley, Lancaster North, Lancaster South, The Raynhams, Walsingham, and Wensum.

The seat includes the District of Broadland wards which had previously comprised a majority of the Mid Norfolk constituency, as well as Drayton and Taverham, transferred back from Norwich North. The six District of North Norfolk wards, including the town of Fakenham, were transferred from the constituency of North Norfolk.

=== Current ===
Further to the 2023 review of Westminster constituencies, which came into effect for the 2024 general election, the composition of the Broadland and Fakenham constituency is as follows (as they existed on 1 December 2020):

- The District of Broadland wards of: Acle; Aylsham; Blofield with South Walsham; Brundall; Burlingham; Buxton; Coltishall; Eynesford; Great Witchingham; Hevingham; Horsford and Felthorpe; Marshes; Plumstead; Reepham; Spixworth with St. Faiths; Taverham North; Taverham South; Wroxham.
- The District of North Norfolk wards of: Lancaster North; Lancaster South; Stibbard; The Raynhams; Walsingham.

Minor losses, including the transfer of Drayton back to Norwich North.

== Members of Parliament ==
Election	Member	Party
2010	Keith Simpson	Conservative
2019	Jerome Mayhew	Conservative
Broadland and Fakenham
2024	Jerome Mayhew	Conservative

== Elections ==
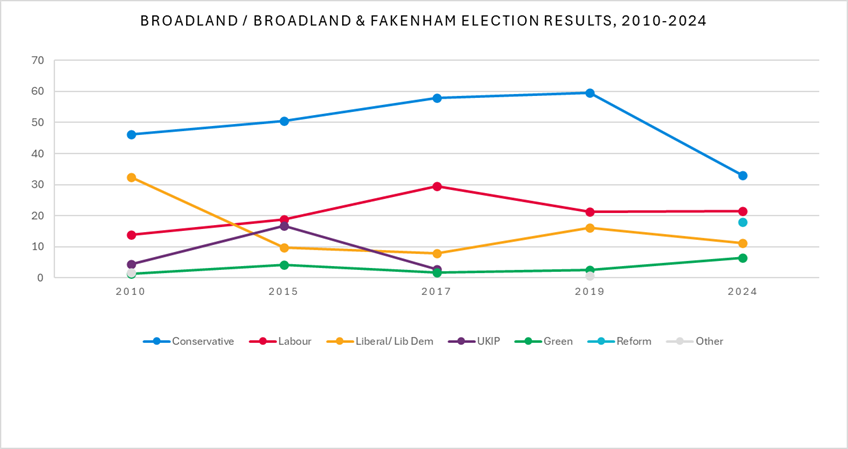
Broadland election results 2010–2024

=== Elections in the 2020s ===
General election 2024: Broadland and Fakenham
Party	Candidate	Votes	%	±%
Conservative	Jerome Mayhew	16,322	33.0	−26.1
Labour	Iain Simpson	15,603	31.5	+9.9
Reform	Eric Masters	8,859	17.9	N/A
Liberal Democrats	Leyla Hannbeck	5,526	11.2	−4.9
Green	Jan Davis	3,203	6.5	+4.0
Majority		719	1.5	−36.0
Turnout		49,513	65.4	−7.0
Registered electors		75,730		
Conservative hold		Swing	−18.0	

=== Elections in the 2010s ===
2019 notional result
Party	Vote	%
Conservative	31,239	59.1
Labour	11,414	21.6
Liberal Democrats	8,480	16.1
Green	1,318	2.5
Others	363	0.7
Turnout	52,814	72.4
Electorate	72,907	

General election 2019: Broadland
Party	Candidate	Votes	%	±%
Conservative	Jerome Mayhew	33,934	59.6	+1.7
Labour	Jess Barnard	12,073	21.2	−8.4
Liberal Democrats	Ben Goodwin	9,195	16.1	+8.2
Green	Andrew Boswell	1,412	2.5	+0.8
The Universal Good Party	Simon Rous	363	0.6	N/A
Majority		21,861	38.4	+10.1
Turnout		56,977	72.9	+0.5
Conservative hold		Swing	+5.1	

General election 2017: Broadland
Party	Candidate	Votes	%	±%
Conservative	Keith Simpson	32,406	57.9	+7.4
Labour	Iain Simpson	16,590	29.6	+10.8
Liberal Democrats	Steve Riley	4,449	7.9	−1.9
UKIP	David Moreland	1,594	2.8	−13.9
Green	Andrew Boswell	932	1.7	−2.5
Majority		15,816	28.3	−3.4
Turnout		55,971	72.4	+1.3
Conservative hold		Swing	−1.7	

General election 2015: Broadland
Party	Candidate	Votes	%	±%
Conservative	Keith Simpson	26,808	50.5	+4.3
Labour	Chris Jones	9,970	18.8	+5.0
UKIP	Stuart Agnew	8,881	16.7	+12.2
Liberal Democrats	Steve Riley	5,178	9.8	−22.6
Green	Andrew Boswell	2,252	4.2	+2.8
Majority		16,838	31.7	+17.9
Turnout		53,098	71.1	−0.9
Conservative hold		Swing	−0.3	

General election 2010: Broadland
Party	Candidate	Votes	%	±%
Conservative	Keith Simpson*	24,338	46.2	+2.8
Liberal Democrats	Daniel Roper	17,046	32.4	+2.9
Labour	Allyson Barron	7,287	13.8	−9.8
UKIP	Stuart Agnew	2,382	4.5	+1.1
BNP	Edith Crowther	871	1.7	N/A
Green	Susan Curran	752	1.4	N/A
Majority		7,292	13.8	−0.1
Turnout		52,676	72.0	+7.6
Conservative hold		Swing		

* Served in the 2005–2010 Parliament as MP for Mid Norfolk

== See also ==
- List of parliamentary constituencies in Norfolk
