= Geoffrey Shakespeare =

British Liberal Party politician (1893–1980)

The Right Honourable Sir Geoffrey Shakespeare Bt
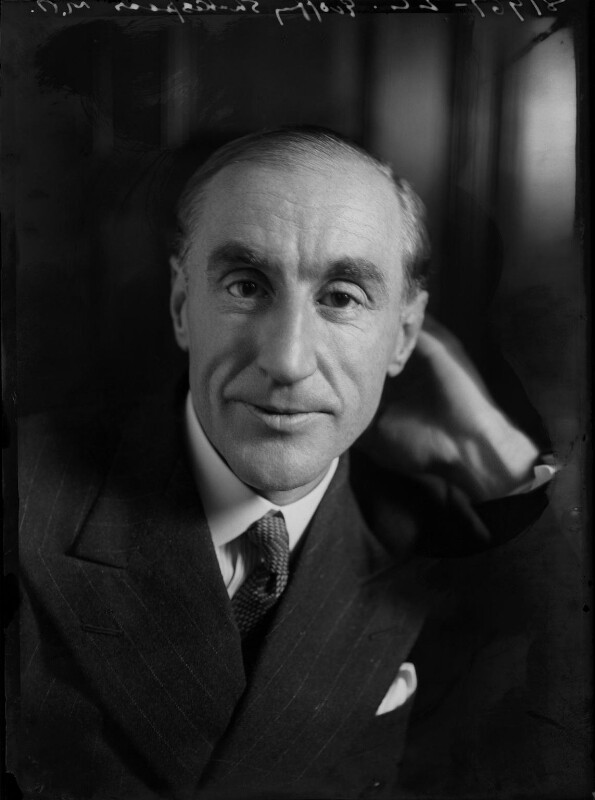
- Shakespeare in 1936

Member of Parliament for Wellingborough
- In office 15 November 1922 – 16 November 1923
- Preceded by: Walter Smith
- Succeeded by: William Cove

Member of Parliament for Norwich
- In office 30 May 1929 – 15 June 1945
- Preceded by: Hilton Young and J. Griffyth Fairfax
- Succeeded by: Lucy Noel-Buxton and John Paton

Personal details
- Born: 23 September 1893 Norwich, England
- Died: 8 September 1980 (aged 86) Bromley, England
- Parent: Rev. John Howard Shakespeare (father)

Sir Geoffrey Hithersay Shakespeare, 1st Baronet (23 September 1893 – 8 September 1980) was a British Liberal and later Liberal National politician.

== Life ==
Born in Norwich, the second son of Rev. John Howard Shakespeare, secretary of the Baptist Union of Great Britain, he was educated at Highgate School. He was a descendant of Richard Shakespeare, the grandfather of William Shakespeare. He served in the First World War. He studied at Emmanuel College, Cambridge, where he graduated with an MA and an LLB degree. He was president of the Cambridge Union Society in Lent Term 1920.

He was called to the Bar in 1922, was Private Secretary to David Lloyd George in 1921–1923 and worked as a political journalist. As Private Secretary, he attended the peace negotiations leading to the Anglo-Irish Treaty of 1921, of which he gave a valuable account in his memoirs, Let Candles be Brought In.

He was National Liberal Member of Parliament (MP) for Wellingborough, Northamptonshire in 1922–1923 and Liberal Member for Norwich in 1929–1931 and Liberal National member in 1931–1945.

He served in government as a Lord Commissioner of the Treasury and Liberal National Chief Whip from November 1931 – October 1932, as Parliamentary Secretary to the Ministry of Health in 1932–1936, Parliamentary Secretary to the Board of Education in 1936–1937, Parliamentary and Financial Secretary to the Admiralty in 1937–1940, Secretary for Overseas Trade from April to May 1940, Parliamentary Under-Secretary of State for Dominion Affairs from 1940 to 1942. He was also chairman of the Children's Overseas Reception Board, 1940–1942.

He was a Director of Abbey National Building Society from 1943 to 1977, and was Deputy chairman from 1965 to 1969. He was chairman of the Standing Council of the Baronetage in 1972–1975.

He was created a baronet in 1942 and appointed a Privy Counsellor in 1945. He died in Bromley, Kent, aged 86.

In 1949, he published a memoir, Let Candles Be Brought In. It was of great value to historians of the Anglo-Irish peace negotiations in 1921, to which he was an eyewitness. Particularly useful is his description of the final hours of the talks on 5–6 December 1921 when Lloyd George presented the Irish delegation with the famous ultimatum that they must sign the Treaty at once or face "terrible and immediate war".

His grandson is the sociologist and bioethicist Tom Shakespeare.

Coat of arms of Geoffrey Shakespeare
Crest In front of a portcullis Sable an eagle rising grasping with the dexter claw a spear Or barbed Argent. Escutcheon Or on a bend between in chief a portcullis and in base an anchor Sable a spear of the field.

== Bibliography ==
- Craig, F. W. S. (1983) [1969]. British parliamentary election results 1918–1949 (3rd ed.). Chichester: Parliamentary Research Services. ISBN 0-900178-06-X.
- Mark Pottle, entry on Shakespeare in Dictionary of National Biography, OUP 2004–08
- Leigh Rayment's list of baronets
- Leigh Rayment's Historical List of MPs

Parliament of the United Kingdom
Preceded by Walter Smith	Member of Parliament for Wellingborough; 1922–1923	Succeeded by William Cove
Preceded by Hilton Young; J. Griffyth Fairfax	Member of Parliament for Norwich; 1929–1945; With: Walter Smith 1929–1931; George Hartland 1931–1935; Henry Strauss 1935–1945	Succeeded by Lucy Noel-Buxton; John Paton
Baronetage of the United Kingdom
New creation	Baronet (of Lakenham); 1942–1980	Succeeded by William Geoffrey Shakespeare
