= Stuttaford =

Stuttaford is a surname. Notable people with the surname include:

- Richard Stuttaford (1870–1945), South African businessman and politician
- Thomas Stuttaford (1931–2018), British doctor, politician, author, medical columnist
- Wally Stuttaford, Rhodesian/Zimbabwean politician
- William Stuttaford (1928–1999), British stockbroker, businessman and political activist
