= Ropner =

Ropner is a surname. Notable people with the surname include:

- Sir Leonard Ropner, 1st Baronet (1895–1977), British politician
- Pamela Ropner (1931–2013), British writer
- Robert Ropner (1838–1924), British shipbuilder and politician
- Johanna Ropner (1963–present), British lord lieutenant of North Yorkshire

== See also ==
- Ropner baronets, British baronetcies
