= Blida (disambiguation) =

Blida is a city in Algeria.

Blida may also refer to:

== People ==
- Saint Blida, an Anglo-Saxon saint
- Barbara Blida (1949–2007), Polish politician

== Places ==
- Blida, Lebanon
- Blida Province, Algeria

== Other uses ==
- USM Blida, an Algerian football team
- First Battle of Blida (July 1830)
