= John Garrett (British politician) =

British management consultant and Labour Party politician

Member of Parliament for Norwich South
- In office 28 February 1974 – 13 May 1983
- Preceded by: Thomas Stuttaford
- Succeeded by: John Powley
- In office 11 June 1987 – 8 April 1997
- Preceded by: John Powley
- Succeeded by: Charles Clarke

Personal details
- Born: 8 September 1931 Romford, Essex, England
- Died: 11 September 2007 (aged 76) Norwich, Norfolk, England
- Party: Labour
- Spouse: Wendy Ady (m. 1959)
- Children: 2
- Education: Monoux School
- Alma mater: University College, Oxford

John Laurence Garrett (8 September 1931 – 11 September 2007) was a British management consultant and Labour Party politician. He was Member of Parliament for Norwich South for 19 years in two non-consecutive terms, from 1974 to 1983, and later from 1987 to 1997.

== Early life ==
Garrett was born in Romford, the son of a book-keeper. He was brought up in Walthamstow, and attended the Monoux School. After National Service in the Royal Air Force he read geography at University College, Oxford, graduating with a first. He undertook research into industrial location, receiving a B.Litt, and spent a year at the University of California graduate business school as a King George VI Fellow.

He worked in industry as a labour officer in the chemical industry, then a market research manager in the car industry, and finally a management consultant with Inbucon from 1963. He contributed to the Fulton Commission, on the reform of the civil service, from 1966 to 1968.

== Political career ==
He joined the Labour Party in 1951, and was elected to Greenwich Borough Council in 1970. He fought Norwich South in 1972, and unseated the Conservative Thomas Stuttaford, a local GP, at the February 1974 general election. He was re-elected in October 1974, and served as Parliamentary private secretary to the Minister for the Civil Service, Robert Sheldon, in 1974, and to the Minister of State for Social Security, Stan Orme, from 1977 to 1979.

He was re-elected again in 1979, and became an opposition spokesman on Trade and Industry, but failed to gain a position in the shadow cabinet as a Tribune group candidate. With Robert Sheldon and Norman St John-Stevas, he was instrumental in the creation of the system of departmental Select committees. He and Sheldon collaborated in the establishment of the statutory independence of the National Audit Office.

He lost his seat to the Conservative John Powley in the Conservative landslide at the 1983 election, and returned to work for Inbucon, but regained the seat at the next election, with a majority of only 336.

He resumed his post as an opposition spokesman on Trade and Industry, then moved on to Energy, and finally to the Civil Service. He was re-elected in 1992, but retired due to ill health at the 1997 general election. His successor as MP for Norwich South was Charles Clarke, who later became Home Secretary.

In retirement, he was a councillor for on Norfolk County Council from 1997 to 2001 and then on Norwich City Council, representing Bowthorpe. He was an honorary lecturer in government at the University of East Anglia.

== Personal life ==
Garrett married Wendy Ady in 1959; they had two daughters.

Garrett died in Norwich on 11 September 2007, aged 76.

== Sources ==
- Times Guide to the House of Commons, Times Newspapers Limited, 1987, 1992 and 1997 editions.
- Leigh Rayment's Historical List of MPs

Parliament of the United Kingdom
Preceded by Thomas Stuttaford	Member of Parliament for Norwich South; February 1974 – 1983	Succeeded by John Powley
Preceded by John Powley	Member of Parliament for Norwich South; 1987–1997	Succeeded by Charles Clarke
