= Costessey =

Town and civil parish in Norfolk, England

Coordinates: 52.66023°N 1.21614°E

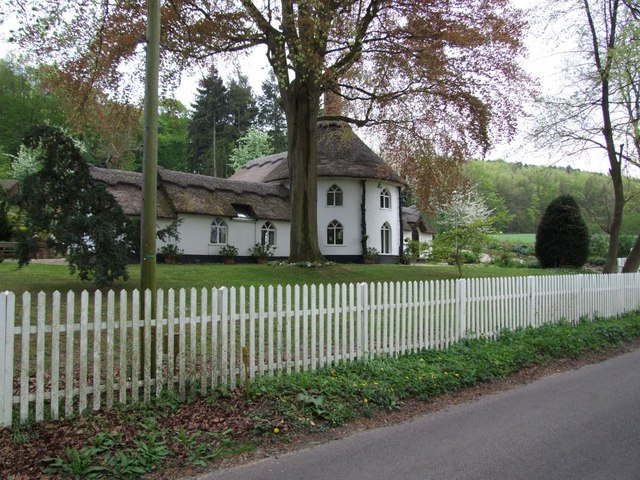
- Beehive Lodge

- Location within Norfolk
- Area: 12.39 km^{2} (4.78 sq mi)
- Population: 12,463 (2011)
  - Density: 1,006/km^{2} (2,610/sq mi)
- OS grid reference: TG176118
- Civil parish: Costessey
- District: South Norfolk
- Shire county: Norfolk
- Region: East
- Country: England
- Sovereign state: United Kingdom
- Post town: NORWICH
- Postcode district: NR5, NR8
- Dialling code: 01603
- Police: Norfolk
- Fire: Norfolk
- Ambulance: East of England
- UK Parliament: South Norfolk; Norwich South

Costessey (/ˈkɒsi/ KOSS-ee) is a town and civil parish in the South Norfolk district of Norfolk, England, and is 4 miles (6.4 km) north west of Norwich. The civil parish forms part of the Norwich Urban Area. It includes the residential suburb of Queen's Hills.

== History ==
Costessey lies in the valleys of the rivers Wensum and Tud. Archaeological records indicate that there was a strong farming community on this site during the late Bronze Age and Roman times. Anglo-Saxon settlers established a community at some point after 600 AD, and it is generally believed that the name Costessey, meaning Kost's Island, dates from this time. Furthermore, records from 1648 recount that Oliver Cromwell referred to the village and estate as Cossey, indicating that the current pronunciation of the name has long existed. There is also evidence to suggest that the spelling was changed from Cossey to Costessey in the 19th century.

Costessey features in the legend of St Walstan, the little-known patron saint of farm labourers, who is remembered in villages across Norfolk and north Suffolk. According to legend, Walstan was born into the nobility at neighbouring Bawburgh – then part of the Costessey estate – circa 970, but relinquished his privileges, choosing instead to spend most of his life working as a farm labourer in Taverham. It is said that his initial route took him on foot from Bawburgh to Taverham through Costessey Park, where he donated his fine garments to some passing peasants. Following his death and the return of his body by cart to Bawburgh, springs of holy water are said to have arisen at three sites in Taverham, Costessey and Bawburgh.

=== Manor of Costessey ===
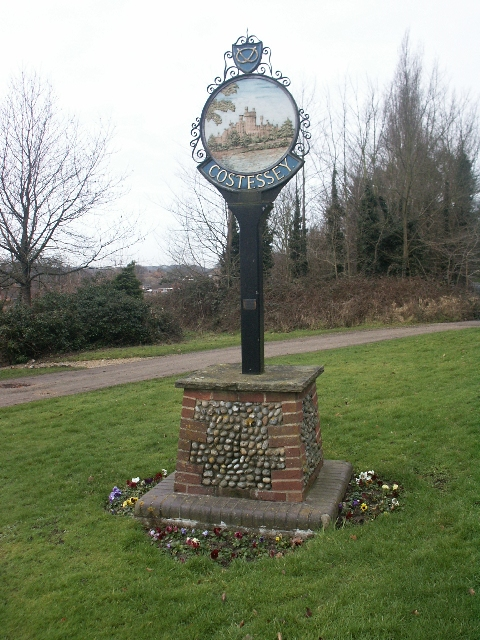
The village sign depicting the now derelict Costessey Hall

In the Domesday Book of 1086, the village of Costesela appears in the hundred of Forehoe, with mention of a mill, and of a manor with over of estate across Norfolk, including the only listed hunting park in Norfolk. This formerly belonged to Earl Gyrth Godwinson but was awarded by William the Conqueror to his Breton relative, Count Alan Rufus. Here began a 500-year period in which ownership of the manor passed through a variety of families, regularly being reverted to the Crown and reallocated.

In 1546, Henry VIII granted the manor to Anne of Cleves, his fourth wife, although evidence suggests that she never actually occupied Costessey Hall. A surviving early Tudor building sited in what remains of Costessey Park is thought by some to be the hall granted by Henry. In 1555, Queen Mary granted Costessey Manor to Sir Henry Jerningham, heralding a long period of occupancy by the Jernegans, Jerninghams and Stafford Jerninghams. Sir Henry commissioned the building of a new Tudor Hall on Costessey Park, beginning his residency there in 1565.

In 1827, Sir George William Jerningham, 8th Baron Stafford, commissioned large-scale grand and elaborate expansions of Sir Henry's Hall, with many towers and mock-Tudor windows. The project was ongoing over several decades, continued by the 9th Baron Stafford from 1851, and although many features of the new design were realised, completion was ultimately prevented by dwindling funds. The 10th Baron Stafford, who inherited the title in 1884, was certified as a lunatic; during his ownership, the estate was held by the Lunacy Commission. The generous and reclusive Sir FitzOsbert Stafford Jerningham, 11th Baron Stafford, resided at Costessey Hall until his death in 1913, upon which the Hall's contents were auctioned at a high-profile sale.

== Late 19th century map ==
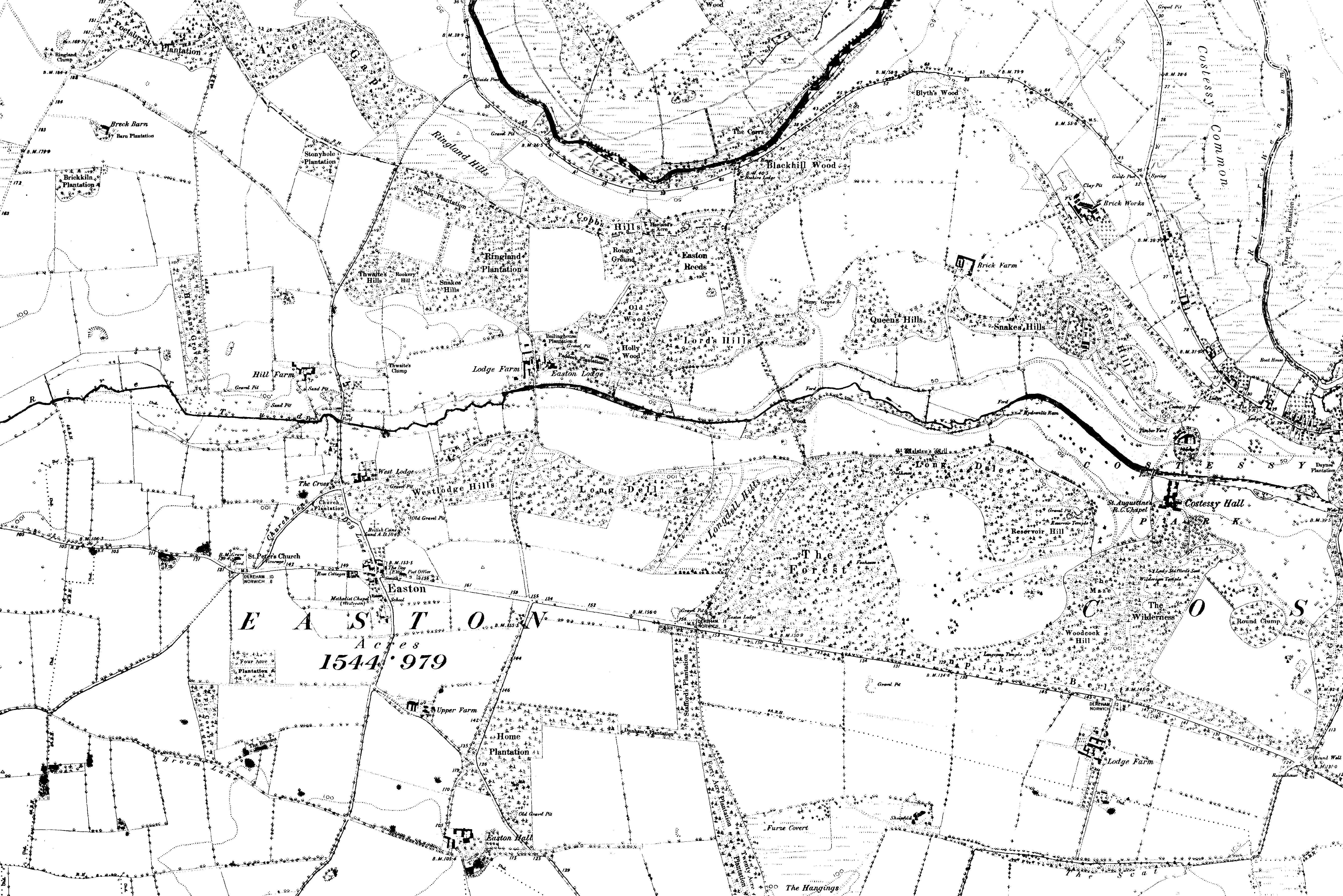
"Costessy": western half in the 1880s or 90s. Click for broader map and to enable varied magnification. The number of acres equates to 4.74 square miles.

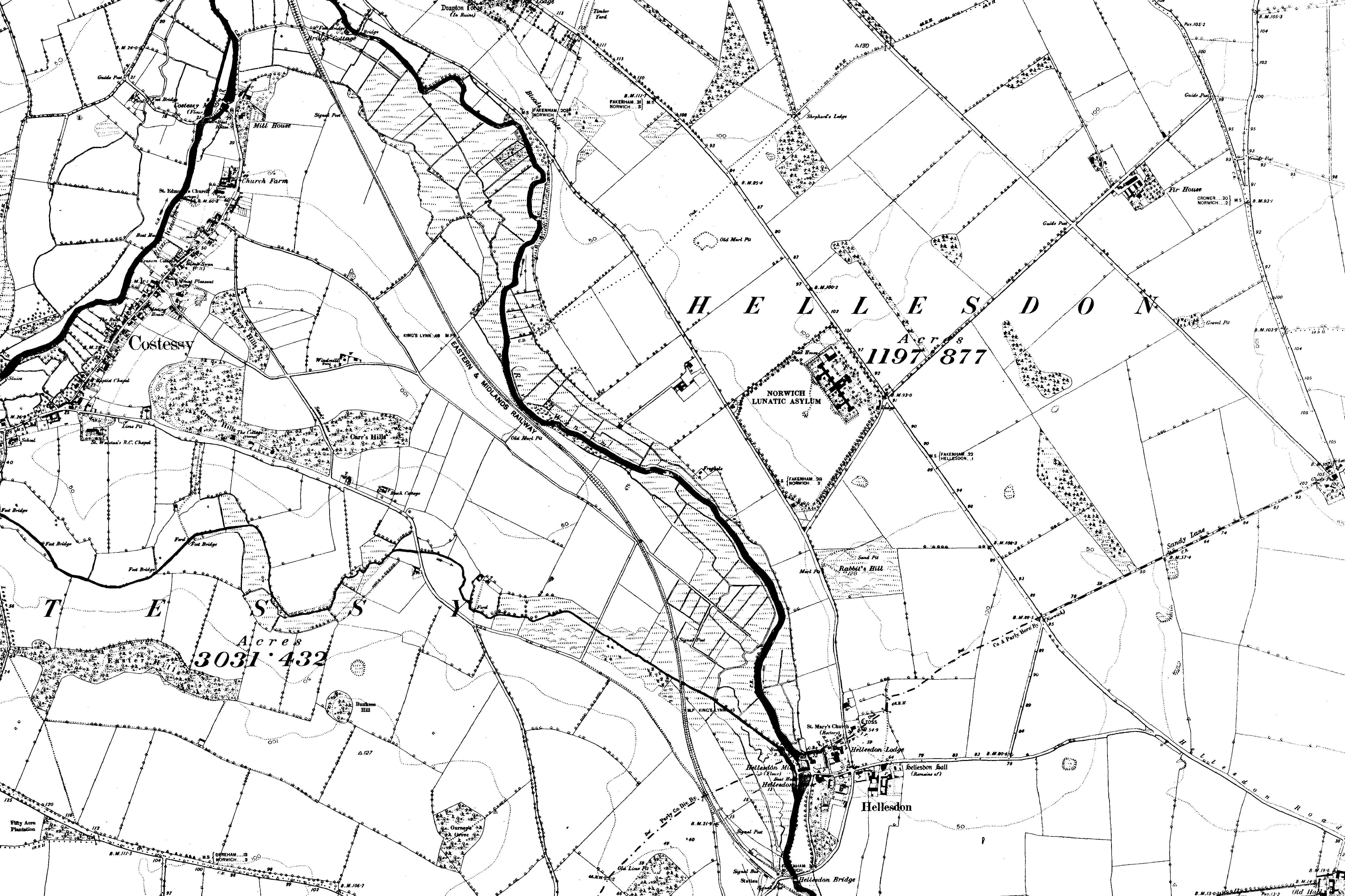
(eastern half).

=== Costessey since 1913 ===
The final owner of the empty but intact Costessy Hall building was the War Office, who commandeered the Hall from 1914 to 1918 for the training of infantry, cavalry and artillery troops to serve in World War I. Soon after war ended, Costessey Park was divided into small plots sold cheaply to working-class residents of Norwich, who erected makeshift wooden houses or brought disused railway carriages as their dwellings. The well-trodden paths amongst these plots became the basis of a street network, and the ramshackle homes gave way to brick buildings during the 1930s – 1950s, to become New Costessey. The street names of Jerningham Road and Stafford Avenue honour the local associations with the aristocratic family.

The structure of Costessey Hall was gradually weathered, plundered by builders, and carefully demolished over a period of several decades. During training for World War II, one of the towers was struck by a fully armed Blenheim Bomber from a nearby airfield, causing the death of the unfortunate pilot but inflicting remarkably little damage upon the tower. Today, all that remains of the building is the belfry tower, now ivy-clad, and a small adjoining block, which stand prominently in what is now Costessey Park Golf Course. Costessey village sign depicts the hall in its former splendour. Plans for the hall to be part of a new complex for an architecture business are only in their early stages.

== Amenities ==
=== Services ===
There are four pubs (The Bush, The Harte, The Crown and The Copper Beech, which was built in 2011 near Longwater Retail Park); a fifth (The Roundwell), was on the former edge of Costessey Park. It was demolished in 2010.

A new NHS doctors' clinic, the Roundwell Medical Centre, was recently built thereon replacing the old.

Since early summer 2010 the Costessey Centre, a new community centre, stands by Longwater Lane recreation grounds.

The parish contains out-of-town superstores by a Park and Ride site, which serves the Norfolk and Norwich University Hospital and the University of East Anglia, at regulated, subsidised fares.

Norfolk Showground is on the western parish border with Easton.

=== Footpaths and nature ===
Marriott's Way footpath follows the route of the dismantled Norwich-to-Reepham railway across the north of the parish. Pockets of old woodland remain at East Hills and Gunton Lane, the latter named after the prominent Gunton family of Costessey.

=== Education ===
There are now four schools in Costessey. Catering for the ages 4 to 11 are Costessey Primary School, Queen's Hill Primary School, and in Old Costessey, St Augustine's Roman Catholic Primary Schools.

Ormiston Victory Academy is for pupils from the ages of 11 to 18. It replaced Costessey High School in 2010. The academy, under Dame Rachel de Souza, was rated Outstanding by Ofsted.

== See also ==
- Stafford knot – the family emblem, which is incorporated into the design of the Staffordshire arms.

== Sources ==
- Gage, Ernest G. (1991). Costessey Hall: A Retrospect of the Jernegans, Jerninghams and Stafford Jerninghams of Costessey Hall, Norfolk. Colin House, Norwich. ISBN 0-9517494-0-4.
- Gage, Ernest G. (2003). Costessey: A Look Into The Past. Brian Gage, Norwich. ISBN 0-9542113-0-8.
- "The Hundred of Forehoe: Cossey".http://www.british-history.ac.uk/topographical-hist-norfolk/vol2/pp406-419. Retrieved 9 April 2015.
- "Costessey". People and events through the centuries (Part I: To mid sixteenth-century). Archived from the original on 13 January 2011.
- "British Survey". All About New Costessey. Archived from the original on 14 June 2005.
- "Norfolk County Council Planning & Transportation" (PDF). Demographic Information Note.
- Office for National Statistics & Norfolk County Council (2001). Census population and household counts for unparished urban areas and all parishes. Retrieved on 2 December 2005.
- "£15m cash injection for Costessey school". Evening News report on Costessey cash injection. 6 January 2011.
