= Ormiston Victory Academy =

Location
- Middleton Crescent; Costessey, Norfolk, NR5 0PX; England; 52°39′00″N 1°12′42″E

Information
- Type: Academy
- Established: 1952
- Trust: Ormiston Academies Trust
- Department for Education URN: 136186 Tables
- Ofsted: Reports
- Principal: Naomi Palmer
- Gender: Coeducational
- Age: 11 to 19
- Website: www.ormistonvictoryacademy.co.uk

Ormiston Victory Academy (formerly Costessey High School) is a secondary school and sixth form located in Costessey, Norfolk, England. The academy has specialisms in Science and Applied Learning.

The academy catchment area covers Easton, Marlingford, East Tuddenham, Bawburgh and the neighbouring suburb of Bowthorpe, as well as Costessey. The school students from Year 7 to Year 11 study GCSEs. The academy sixth form (Lord Nelson Sixth Form) offers its Year 12 to Year 13 students A Levels.

== History ==
Costessey High School was renamed Ormiston Victory Academy in September 2010.

A building designed by Nicholas Hare Architects has been built replacing the old school building, and can now cater for 1250 pupils. The academy received a £15 million to revamp the old site. The new school building opened in November 2013.

== Ofsted inspections ==
In 1999 the school, then Costessey High School, was judged Inadequate by Ofsted.

In August 2014 The Observer newspaper alleged that the school was given two weeks' advance warning of a May 2013 inspection by Ofsted, the government body responsible for inspecting and regulating schools. In England and Wales schools should not be informed of an inspection before noon on the day prior to the inspection.

The newspaper cited whistleblowers who claimed that the advance notice enabled the school to "parachute" in extra teaching staff who had never taught at the school prior to the inspection, "to put in place high-quality lesson planning, get on top of marking and create "evidence files" presenting the day-to-day running of the school in as positive light as possible," and "to mitigate for known staff absence" by providing a supply teacher with "comprehensive lesson plan materials in an "Ofsted-friendly" format... including detailed information on each pupil's progress, especially for the inspection, before the school was notified officially by Ofsted of the visit."

Ormiston Academies Trust denied that the school "received prior notification not allowed under Ofsted rules". Ofsted initially stated that the school did not receive an early warning and that it "had not received any complaints about any of the inspections" but later admitted that it had received an official complaint from one parent in May 2013. The complainant said that his daughter, a pupil at the school, had been told by a teacher that an inspection would be taking place a week later. A teacher who had worked at the school during the May inspection also claimed that "senior staff knew the exact inspection dates the previous week."

Ofsted subsequently announced: "Ofsted regional director Sir Robin Bosher is reviewing the circumstances of specific inspections in Norfolk and the wider handling of the sharing of information about inspection schedules. He will report back shortly."

Sir Michael Wilshaw, Her Majesty's Chief Inspector of Education, Children's Services and Skills, said: "If any evidence comes to light that proves anyone within Ofsted or our contractors have shared information inappropriately, I will have no hesitation in taking the strongest possible action."

== Notable alumni ==
=== Costessey High School ===
- Sam Claflin, actor
