= William Stuttaford =

British stockbroker, businessman and Conservative activist

Sir William Royden Stuttaford CBE (21 November 1928 – 2 January 1999), also known as Bill Stuttaford, was a British stockbroker, businessman and Conservative activist, a President of the National Union of Conservative and Unionist Associations.

== Early life ==
Born in 1928, the son of Dr William Joseph Edward Stuttaford and his wife Mary Marjorie Dean Royden, Stuttaford was educated at Gresham's School, Holt, and Trinity College, Oxford. He was a brother of Thomas Stuttaford and an uncle of Andrew Stuttaford.

== Career ==
He was commissioned as a second lieutenant into the 10th Royal Hussars in 1952, then took up a career as a stockbroker and was a member of the London Stock Exchange from 1959 to 1992, Chairman of Framlington Unit Management from 1974 to 1987 and of the Framlington Group from 1983 to 1989. He was also Senior Partner of Laurence, Prust & Co., from 1983 to 1986, a Director of Brown Shipley Holdings, 1990–1993, of Towry Law, 1993–1998, and Chairman of the Unit Trust Association, 1987–89, and a Director of Amvescap (formerly Invesco) plc, 1993–1998.

== Political life ==
For much of his life an active member of the Conservative Party, Stuttaford was chairman of the Conservative Political Centre from 1978 to 1981, of the Eastern Area Conservative Council from 1986 to 1989, joint vice-chairman of the National Union of Conservative and Unionist Associations from 1991 to 1994 and finally NUCUA's president in 1994–1995.

== Private life ==
In 1958, Stuttaford married firstly Sarah Jane Legge, and they had two sons and two daughters. In 1974, he married secondly Susan d'Esterre Grahame (née Curteis).

He was a member of the Cavalry and Guards Club.

At the time of his death, he lived at Moulshams Manor, Great Wigborough, near Colchester, Essex.
