= Queen's Hills =

Suburb of Costessey, Norfolk, England

Coordinates: 52°39′53″N 1°10′58″E

Queen's Hills is a residential suburb located in Costessey, a civil parish on the western outskirts of Norwich, Norfolk, England. Developed primarily in the early 21st century, Queen's Hills has rapidly expanded, with its population growing from 92 in 2001 to 4,463 by 2021.

== History ==
Queen's Hills was developed as a modern housing estate in the early 2000s to accommodate the growing population of Norwich and its surrounding areas. The area was previously rural land before being transformed into a suburban community. It was named for Anne of Cleves, forth wife of King Henry VIII, because In 1546, Henry VIII granted Costessey Hall and its manor to Anne of Cleves. A surviving early Tudor building, located in what remains of Costessey Park near Queen's Hills, is believed to be the hall granted by the king.

== Geography ==
Queen’s Hills is situated in Costessey, west of Norwich, and is bordered by natural landscapes, including woodlands and open spaces. It is part of the South Norfolk district and lies near the A47, providing access to Norwich and other nearby towns.
