= John Powley =

British politician (1936–2020)

Member of Parliament for Norwich South
- In office 9 June 1983 – 18 May 1987
- Preceded by: John Garrett
- Succeeded by: John Garrett

Personal details
- Born: John Albert Powley; 3 August 1936
- Died: 16 October 2020 (aged 84)
- Party: Conservative
- Spouse: Jill Palmer (m. 1957)
- Children: 3
- Education: Cambridge Grammar School; Cambridgeshire College of Arts and Technology

John Albert Powley (3 August 1936 – 16 October 2020) was a British Conservative Party politician. He was the Member of Parliament (MP) for Norwich South between 1983 and 1987 and served as the chairman of the Cambridgeshire County Council from 2011 to 2013. Powley also ran for MP for Harlow in 1979, but was beaten by Labour and Co-operative politician Stan Newens.

== Biography ==
He was born to Albert and Evelyn Powley on 3 August 1936. He attended Cambridge Grammar School and the Cambridgeshire College of Arts and Technology before undergoing national service with the RAF.

Powley was elected to Cambridge City Council and Cambridgeshire and Isle of Ely County Council in 1967. In the mid-1970s, he was instrumental in the construction of the Grafton Centre in Cambridge, a shopping centre, though there was controversy at the time over the demolition of a number of nineteenth-century terraces as a result. He was leader of the City Council beginning in 1976.

At the 1979 general election, he contested Harlow, securing a 13% swing from Labour to Conservative, which just failed to oust Labour MP Stan Newens (by 1,392 votes). In the local elections, held that same day, he lost his seat on Cambridge City Council to the Liberals.

He was elected as the member of parliament for Norwich South in the Conservative landslide at the 1983 general election, defeating Labour incumbent John Garrett, with a majority of 1,712 votes. However, at the 1987 election Garrett regained the seat with a narrow majority of 336 votes.

Powley returned to local government in Cambridgeshire following his defeat. He served as one of the county councillors for Soham and was prominent as a spokesman for the local community following the Soham murders of 2003. He was Chairman of Cambridgeshire County Council for two years from 2011 to 2013, when he decided not to stand for re-election to the County Council after about 50 years of public service.

He married Jill Palmer in 1957 and had three children with her: Stephen, Amanda and Stewart. Powley died in October 2020 at the age of 84.

Parliament of the United Kingdom
Preceded by John Garrett	Member of Parliament for Norwich South; 1983–1987	Succeeded by John Garrett
