= Simon Wright (politician) =

British Liberal Democrat politician

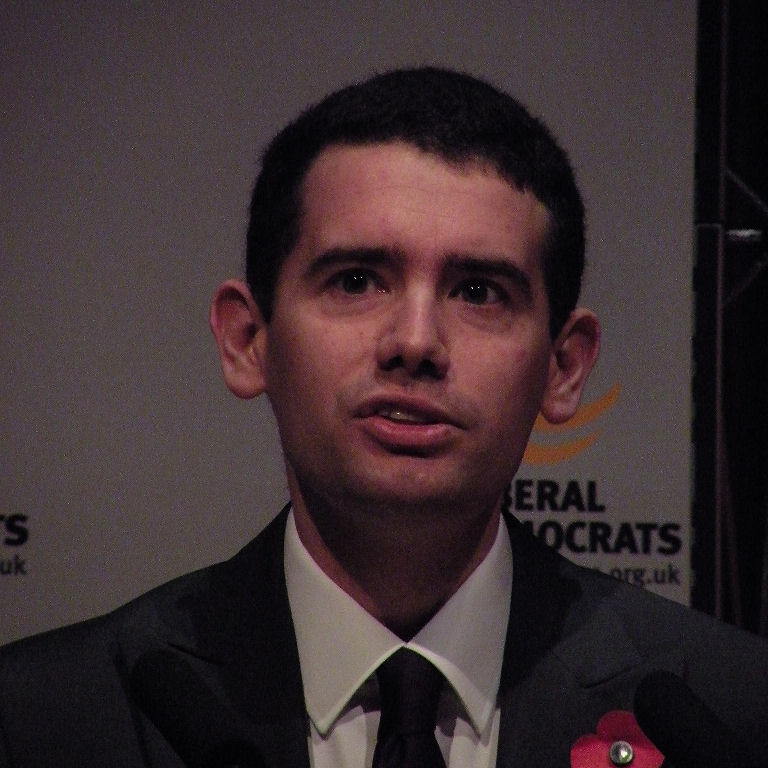
- Wright in 2010

Member of Parliament for Norwich South
- In office 6 May 2010 – 30 March 2015
- Preceded by: Charles Clarke
- Succeeded by: Clive Lewis

Personal details
- Born: 15 September 1979 (age 47)
- Party: Liberal Democrats
- Education: Imperial College London; King's College London

Simon James Wright (born 15 September 1979) is a former British Liberal Democrat politician, who served as the Member of Parliament for Norwich South from 2010 to 2015. Wright defeated former Labour frontbench incumbent Charles Clarke. 29.7% of the votes and a narrow majority of 310 votes. He is now chief executive officer of a Norfolk-based charity, Nelson's Journey.

== Early life ==
Wright was educated at Dereham Neatherd High School. He attended Imperial College London, receiving a BSc in Maths, and King's College London, receiving a PGCE. He has worked as a maths teacher at Alderman Peel High School in Wells-next-the-Sea in North Norfolk.

== Political career ==
Wright was elected as a councillor for the Lancaster North ward (Fakenham) on North Norfolk District Council in 2003. Wright achieved the second-highest percentage of the vote of two seats available in the poll behind Cllr Nich Starling (LD).

Later that year, Wright quit his job as a teacher to become campaigns officer for Norman Lamb, Liberal Democrat MP for North Norfolk. In 2005, Wright oversaw Norman Lamb's successful re-election campaign in North Norfolk, which increased his majority from 483 votes to 10,606.

Wright stepped down as campaigns officer in 2007 to devote himself full-time to being the Liberal Democrat prospective parliamentary candidate for Norwich South.

Wright's first parliamentary appointment saw him appointed to the Environmental Audit Select Committee in July 2010.

He lost his seat at the 2015 general election, when he finished in fourth place behind the Green, Conservative and Labour Party candidates.

== Personal life ==
Simon Wright worked as campaigns officer for Norman Lamb MP. The member of staff whom Wright replaced in that role became his wife in 2006.

After losing his parliamentary seat in 2015, Simon became chief executive officer of a children's bereavement charity called Nelson's Journey in Norfolk in June 2016.

In 2019 Simon got re-married to fellow runner Anna Thorpe, making headlines for taking part in the weekly parkrun with other guests before the ceremony.

Parliament of the United Kingdom
Preceded by Charles Clarke	Member of Parliament for Norwich South; 2010–2015	Succeeded by Clive Lewis
