= Bowthorpe =

Suburban village to the west of Norwich, Norfolk, England

Coordinates: 52.636°N 1.217°E

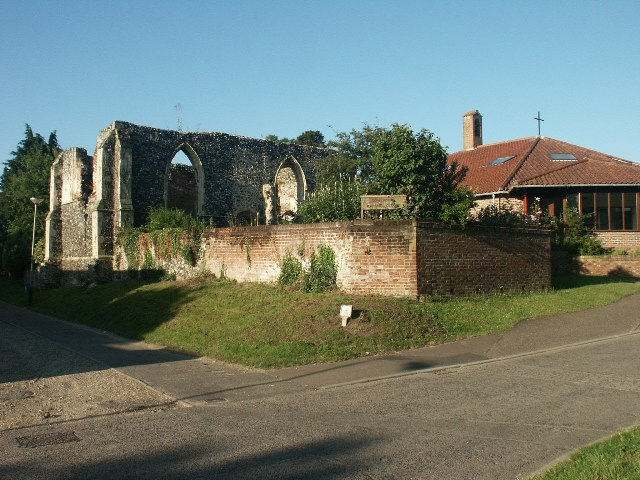
- St Michael's Church, Bowthorpe

- Location within Norfolk
- Population: 11,683 (2011.Norwich Ward)
- District: Norwich
- Shire county: Norfolk
- Region: East
- Country: England
- Sovereign state: United Kingdom
- Post town: NORWICH
- Postcode district: NR5
- Dialling code: 01603
- UK Parliament: Norwich South

Bowthorpe is a suburban village to the west of Norwich, in the county of Norfolk, England.

== Geography ==
Bowthorpe is primarily a residential area, but includes a large industrial estate (Bowthorpe Industrial Estate; occupied by mix-use commercial business, including the technology sector) and one small out-of-town shopping centre, containing a supermarket and various smaller retail outlets. A community hall is situated close to Bowthorpe village centre. A police station was located near the centre until it closed in 2018. Most of present-day Bowthorpe has been developed from the 1970s onward.

Bowthorpe is divided into four distinct areas:

- Clover Hill
- Chapel Break
- Three Score
- Bowthorpe Industrial Estate

The largest of these areas is Clover Hill, a mix of council development and private housing, making up almost two-thirds of Bowthorpe. Clover Hill, situated to the east of the other three areas was developed in the 1970s and 1980s. Further development of the mainly private housing estates, Chapel Break and Three Score took place in the 1990s and early 2000s.

Bowthorpe differs from the nearby estates of Earlham and Costessey; by having a high variability of housing stock, and a centrally planned network of bus and bicycle-only lanes. Large open spaces and parks border the periphery of the Bowthorpe housing estate, with Bowthorpe Park between the north of the estate and Dereham Road, and the Yare Marshland and Bowthorpe Southern Park bordering the south and west of the estate.

== History ==
Bowthorpe's name is of Norse origin and refers to 'Bui's' farm or settlement.

In the Domesday Book, Bowthorpe is recorded as being made up of 19 households and being owned principally by William the Conqueror.

In 1549, Robert Kett briefly camped at Bowthorpe at the beginning of the rebellion that was to bear his name. On 10 July 1549, the Sheriff of Norfolk, Sir Edward Wyndham, was nearly pulled from his house by the rebels in the village as he tried to persuade them to disband. This helped to inspire further people from Norwich to join Kett at his camp in the village. Kett quickly decided that Bowthorpe was too exposed for a rebel camp, and moved on to Mousehold Heath.

In 1931 the civil parish had a population of 44. On 1 April 1935 the parish was abolished and merged with Costessey.

== Politics ==
Bowthorpe Ward falls within the Norwich South constituency (despite being located slightly north), which has been held by the Labour Member of Parliament (MP) Clive Lewis since 2015. Although the ward returned several Conservative councillors to Norwich City Council in the late 2000s, it is presently provides 3 safe seats for the Labour Party, and following the 2019 local elections represented by Councillors Sally Button, Sue Sands and Mike Sands.

== Education ==
Bowthorpe is home to three schools; made up of two infant schools and one junior school. One infant school is located in Clover Hill, the other schools are located in Chapel Break.

There was originally a Bowthorpe High School, which was actually located in nearby Earlham. Bowthorpe High School has since been demolished and replaced with a fire station and private housing. The nearest high schools to Bowthorpe are Ormiston Victory Academy (previously Costessey High School), and the City Academy Norwich (previously Earlham High School).

== Transport ==
Bowthorpe is served by a frequent bus service, operated by First Norfolk & Suffolk, to the University of East Anglia (UEA), Norfolk and Norwich University Hospital (NNUH, formerly known by the acronym N&N), West Earlham, Norwich City Centre and Old Catton.

== Sport ==
Bowthorpe makes a notable contribution to local sport, providing grounds for Norwich's largest 5-a-side football complex. Bowthorpe also was the home of Sunday League team Wendene Wanderers, who folded towards the end of 2010 due to lack of finance. Wendene was mainly a youth club, with many teams ranging from Under-6s to Under-16s.

== Notable people ==
- Herbie Hide, retired heavyweight boxer and former resident
- Paul McVeigh, retired Norwich City and Northern Ireland football player and former resident
- Martin Tyler, English football commentator and former resident
