= Saint Walstan =

East Anglian saint

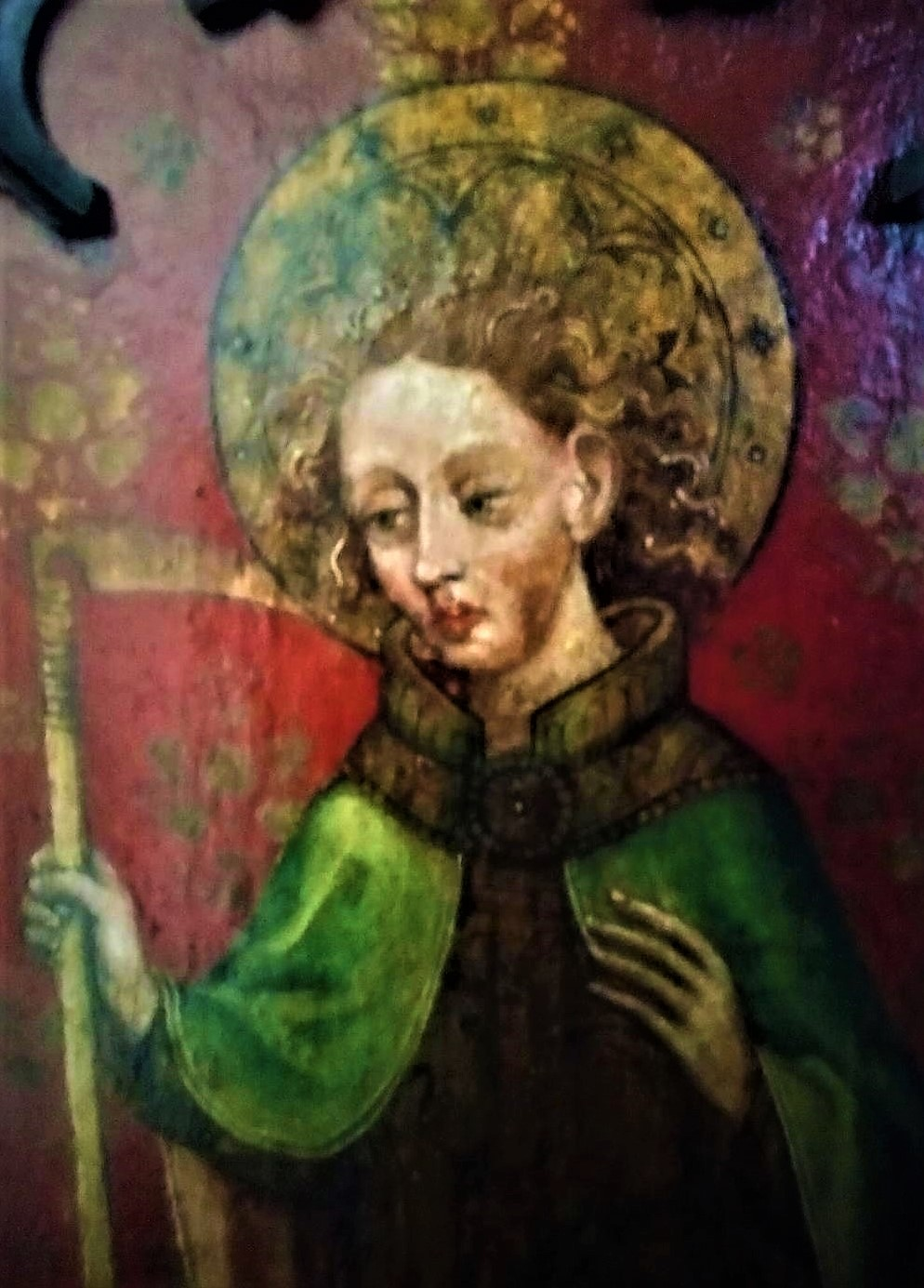
- The saint depicted on part of a mediaeval rood screen at St Mary Magdalene, Norwich

Farmer Confessor
- Born: c. 975? Bawburgh, Norfolk (or Blythburgh, Suffolk)
- Died: c. 1016; Taverham, Norfolk
- Venerated in: Anglican Communion; Eastern Orthodox Church
- Canonized: Pre-Congregation
- Major shrine: previously at Bawburgh
- Feast: 30 May
- Patronage: Farms, farm workers

Walston (recorded as Walstan in some sources) was an Anglo-Saxon prince, known for the miracles which occurred during and after his life after he became a farm worker. He is a patron saint of farm animals and agricultural workers, who once visited his shrine at the church at Bawburgh, in the English county of Norfolk. Two sources for his life exist: the De Sancto Walstano Confessore in the Nova Legenda Angliæ, printed by Wynkyn de Worde in 1516, and known as the English Life; and a later Latin manuscript copied in 1658 from a now lost medieval triptych, now in the Lambeth Palace library in London.

Walstan is associated with Norfolk, but the Latin Life gives his birthplace as Blythburgh in Suffolk and not Bawburgh, as stated in the English Life. Described as the son of Benedict and Blida, he is said to have "received a pious education". At the age of 12 he determined to devote his life to one of prayer, and became a farm worker for a man at Taverham, near Norwich. After being told of his forthcoming death, he made his confession, stopped working and instructed that his two bulls were to pull his body in a cart wherever God willed. After his death on 30 May 1016, his hearse left Taverham and passed through Costessey before reaching Bawburgh, where he was buried; along the route springs miraculously appeared. A small chapel dedicated to Walstan was built at Bawburgh.

He is represented by a crown and sceptre with a scythe in his hand and cattle near him. St Walstan's Day is still celebrated each year in Bawburgh, when a special service takes place on the nearest Sunday to 30 May, his day in the calendar of saints.

== Hagiographical and medieval sources ==
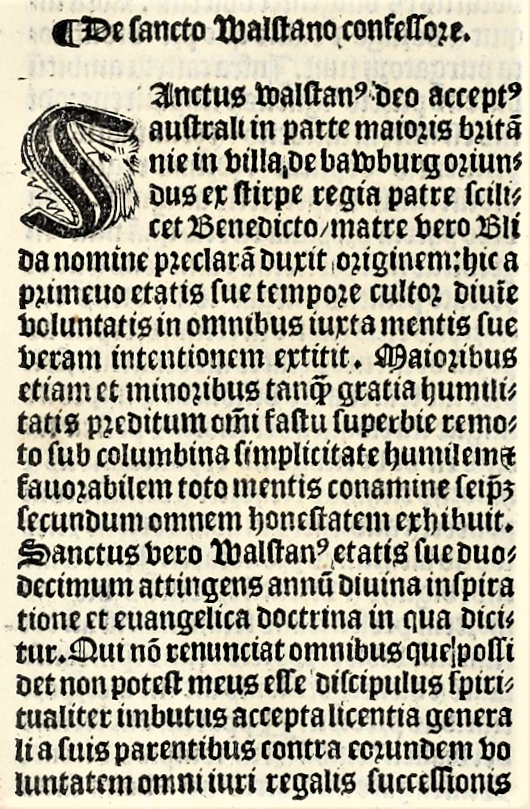
The beginning of Walstan's Latin Life, from the Nova Legenda Angliæ (1516)

Walstan is supposed to have been born in 975. He is associated with the English county of Norfolk, but uncertainty surrounds his actual identity and any details of his life. Information that he existed comes from two sources, the earliest of which is De Sancto Walstano Confessore in the Nova Legenda Angliæ, written by the English historian John Capgrave, and known as the Latin Life. Capgrave's Nova Legenda Angliæ was printed by Wynkyne de Worde in 1516; Walstan was included as one of 15 new saints in a compilation that did not form part of the main text. The source for de Worde's information is unknown.

Walstan's story was also described in a manuscript now known as the Lambeth Life (or English Life), which was copied on 29 September 1658 by a scribe from a now lost medieval triptych from Bawburgh church in Norfolk. Now part of manuscript Lambeth MSS 935 at Lambeth Palace library in London, it is recorded as 'The History of St. Walston taken out of an ancient parchment MS, enclosed in a case of 3 pieces of Wainscott about a yard long each of ym', with a drawing of the case. The triptych was owned by a man named Clarke, a Norfolk recusant, who claimed it once came from Bawburgh.

The two Lives were written for two different audiences; the Latin Life was intended for monastic readership, and the later English Life was meant to be read by lay readers, as indicated when stresses the need to commit to working hard for a master.

Despite being declared a saint prior to the Norman Conquest of England, no images of Walstan or versions of his life are known to have existed before the Latin Life was written centuries later. The Domesday Book, completed in 1086, provides details of Bawburgh, the site of Walstan's shrine during the Middle Ages, but does not state that the church there was important in any way. According to the historian Tim Pestell, the discovery in 2002 of a lead plaque near to the church—possibly a kind of burial inscription—raises the possibility that "devotion to Walstan had already taken hold at Bawburgh by the time of the Norman conquest".

Walstan has been compared with Godric of Finchale, a Norfolk man who was known for his kindness towards animals.

== Legend ==
Walstan was born in the vill of Bawburgh. Descended from royalty, his parents were named as being Benedict and Blithe (or Blida) of Martham, a kinswoman of the English king Æthelred the Unready and his son Edmund Ironside. (Note: Following Blida's death and burial at Martham, a chapel was dedicated in her honour, and bequests were made to her for over 400 years.) As a boy he "received a pious education", showed great devotion to God and was full of divine grace. At the age of 12 he renounced his life of privilege and with his parents' permission determined to devote his life to one of prayer, although not as a monk.

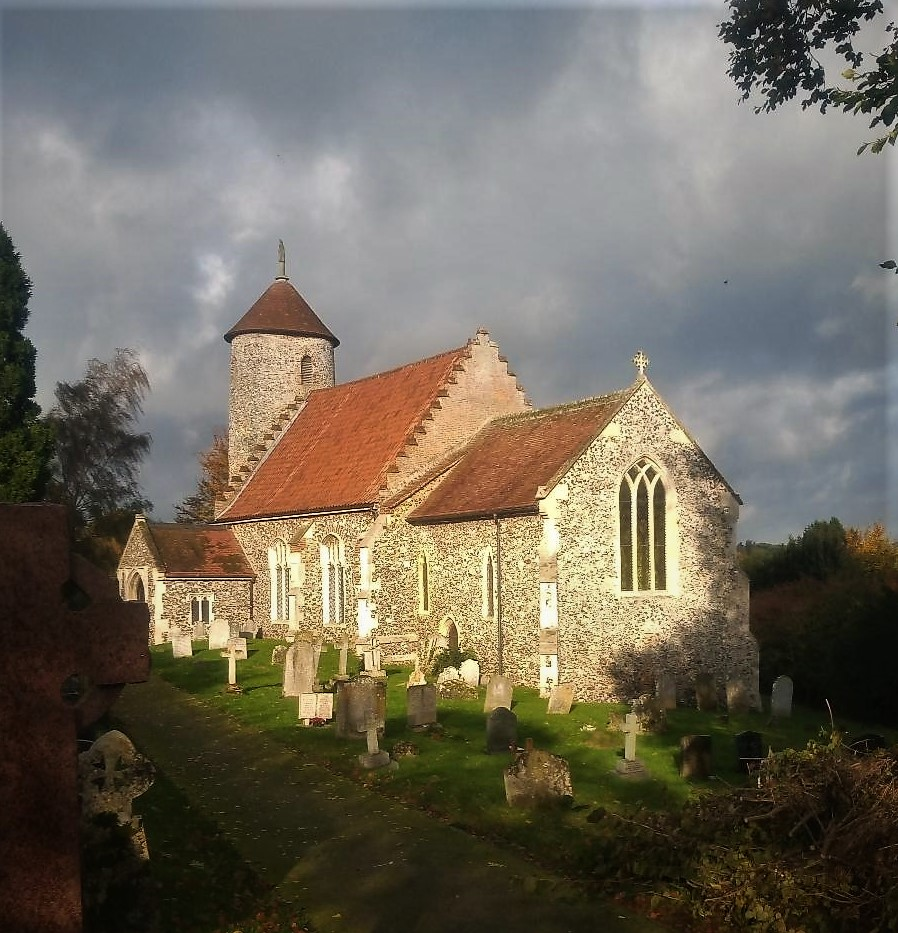
St Mary and St Walstan's, Bawburgh

Walstan became a serf and worked as a farm hand for a man at Taverham. He distributed his belongings amongst the needy and gave away his shoes to a poor man. This act of kindness was witnessed by his master's wife, who then cruelly ordered him to load prickly plants onto a cart. Walstan was miraculously saved from injuring his feet, whereby the woman begged his forgiveness. His master then declared he wished him to be his heir, an offer rejected by Walstan, who instead accepted a gift of a pregnant cow. The animal delivered two calves, which Walstan then cared for, not knowing that one day they would transport his body to where he was to be buried.

One Friday, when he was scything in a field, an angel appeared, saying, "Brother Walstan, on the third day from today you will enter paradise." Walstan then went to make his confession to a priest. The following day he stopped working and on the Monday he instructed his master and others around him that his two bulls were to pull his hearse wherever God ordained. He died that day, on 30 May 1016, and those present witnessed a white dove flying from his mouth to heaven. His hearse left Taverham and passed through Costessey, where the bulls pulled the cart over a deep pool without sinking, and a spring appeared. Near Bawburgh, another spring was made which was later found to have the power to cure the infirm. Walstan was placed inside the church at Bawburgh with the bishop and his monks in attendance. (Note: The bishop and the monks who attended Walstan's funeral are not identified in the legend.) In the following years, people came for themselves and their animals to be cured.

The anonymous English Life gives Walstan's birthplace as "Blyborow town" or Blythburgh, Suffolk, and relates that he was the son of a king; as a young prince he might suddenly return home, which would have threatened the contract established between himself and the farmer in Taverham. The Life contains 11 miracles that occurred from the 14th century onwards, including the miracle of the thorns and the vision of the angel, both also described in the Latin Life.

== Legacy and veneration ==
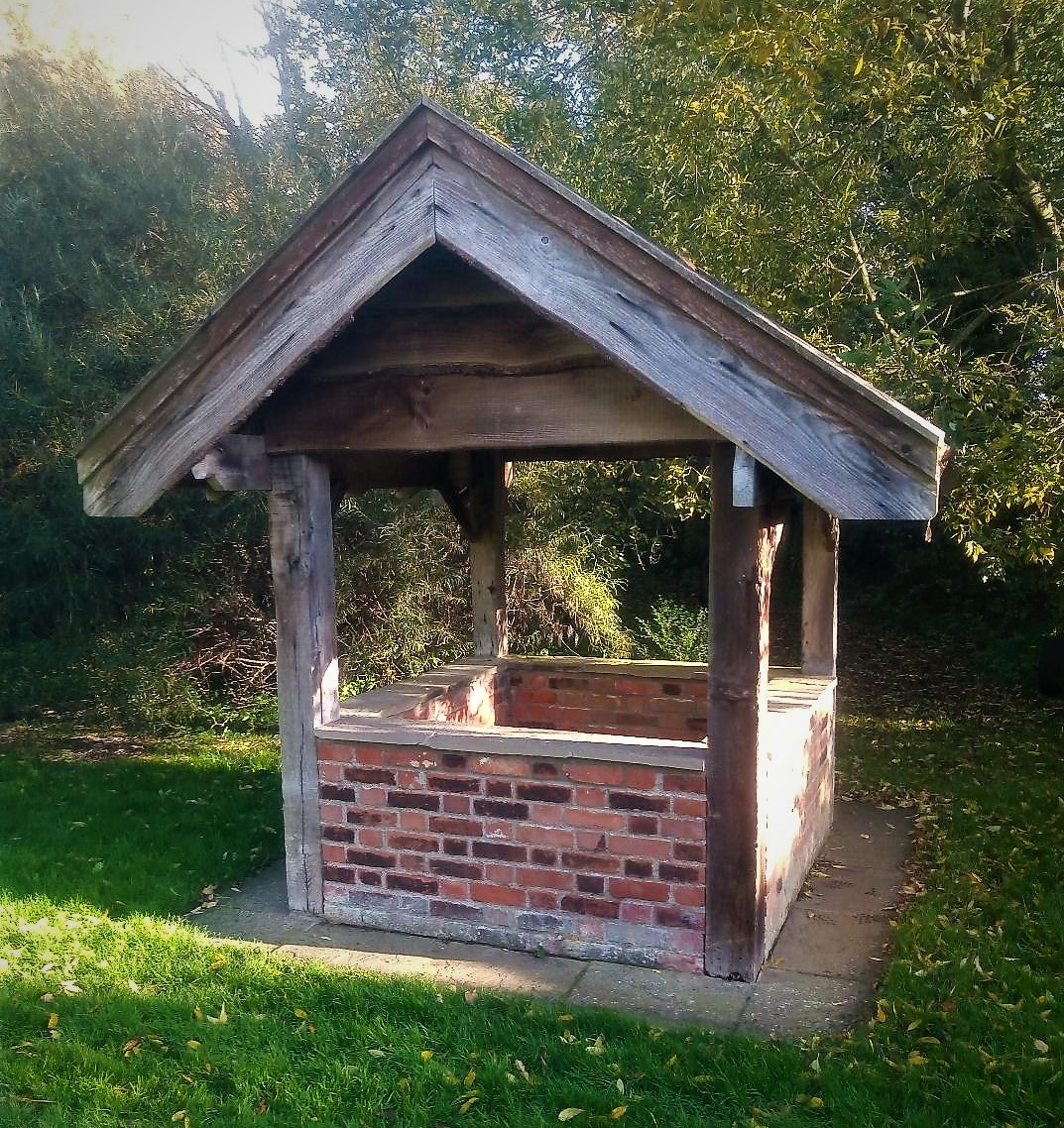
St. Walstan's Well, Bawburgh

A small chapel was built off the existing church dedicated to Mary, which was given a new dedication of Mary and Walstan. He is venerated as a saint of farms and farm workers, and his shrine and the wells associated with him were visited by local farmers and farm laborers throughout the Middle Ages. In 1309 the revenues generated at Bawburgh by pilgrims could provide an income for six priests and the church vicar, in addition to providing the finances needed to rebuild the chancel. In later decades the shrine became ruinous; it was rebuilt in the 15th century. After the dissolution of the monasteries, the church once again fell into disrepair. During the 19th century, the village church regained its prosperity when miracles were associated with the water obtained from the well. In 1913 the Eastern Daily Press named it the "Lourdes of Norfolk". The well at Bawburgh can still be seen.

At Costessey, the second place where Walstan's hearse rested, the well there had dried up by 1750. In April 1978 it was recorded as being a deep circular pit about 4 metres (13 ft) across, with lumps of flint wall at the base, and filled with fallen trees. By January 2015 the depression was still visible, and a plan was proposed to fence off the site of the well and place a plaque there. The site of the well, now located on the grounds of a golf course, has been marked with a sign.

Walstan is represented in religious art by a crown and sceptre (his generic emblems)—at least five figures from medieval rood screens depict him in this way—and with a scythe in his hand and cattle near him (his specific emblems). (Note: Writing in 1850, the church historian Frederick Husenbeth noted five depictions of Walstan in Norfolk: crowned and in royal attire, holding a scythe and styled orb on a painting at the church at Burlingham St, Andrew; leaning on a straight staff, with a scythe blade tied to the top on a rood screen formerly in St James the Less, Pockthorpe, Norwich, and now in St Mary Magdalene, Silver Road, Norwich; holding a scythe and sceptre at Ludham Church and at Barnham Broom; crowned with a scythe and two calves at Sparham, and holding a scythe on the side of Denton's church chest.) Churches dedicated to Walstan dating from before the English Reformation are found in Norfolk. Uniquely outside England, a church in Rongai, Kenya, is dedicated to Walstan.

The historian Kellie Robertson has said that during the Middle Ages, Walstan was a "good example of a localized cult exemplifying the vibrancy of lay popular piety" and "an exemplar of filial love, charity, devotion to work, and obedience to the Church. His absence from medieval liturgical calendars is thought to be a reflection of the local nature of the cult that appeared after his death. Robertson connects Walstan's popularity in the mid 15th century with the popular unrest in East Anglia during this period, caused by restrictive laws on agricultural workers in the aftermath of the Black Death that swept across the country in 1349. That he only appears as a saint in the 16th century—and in a revision of an earlier version of Sanctilogium angliae—implies he was relatively unimportant at the time it was first compiled, and his cult revived in the mid 15th century.

St Walstan's Day is celebrated each year in Bawburgh, when a special Patronal Service takes place on the nearest Sunday to 30 May, his feast date. St. Walstan's Day occurred on 28 December in some 17th and 18th century saints' calendars.

== Sources ==
- Blair, John (2002). "A Handlist of Anglo-Saxon Saints". In Thacker, Alan; Sharpe, Richard (eds.). Local Saints and Local Churches in the Early Medieval West. Oxford: Oxford University Press. ISBN 9-780-19820-394-0.
- Blomefield, Francis (1805). "Hundred of Forehoe: Bawburgh". An Essay Towards A Topographical History of the County of Norfolk. Vol. 2 (British History Online ed.). London. pp. 387–393.
- Bond, Francis (1914). Dedications And Patron Saints of English Churches Ecclesiastical Symbolism Saints And Their Emblems. London; New York: Oxford University Press. OCLC 940457978.
- Byrne, Joseph Patrick (2004). The Black Death. Westport, Connecticut: Greenwood Press. ISBN 9-780-31332-492-5.
- Farmer, David Hugh (2011). The Oxford Dictionary of Saints. Oxford: Oxford University Press. ISBN 9-780-19959-660-7.
- Galbraith, V.H. (1961). The Making of Domesday Book. Oxford: Clarenden Press. ISBN 9-780-31322-344-0.
- Harper-Bill, Christopher (2002). "Searching for Salvation in Anglo-Norman East Anglia". In Harper-Bill, Christopher; Rawcliffe, Carole; Wilson, Richard G. (eds.). East Anglia's History: Studies in Honour of Norman Scarfe. Woodbridge, Suffolk: The Boydell Press. ISBN 978-0-85115-878-5.
- Husenbeth, Frederick Charles (1850). Emblems of saints: by which they are distinguished in works of art. London: Burns and Lambert. OCLC 1044649412.
- Hutchison-Hall, John (Ellsworth) (2014). Orthodox Saints of the British Isles. Vol. II - April–June. United States of America: St. Eadfrith Press. ISBN 978-0-69202-245-0.
- James, M.R. (1916). "Lives of St Walstan of Bawburgh". Norfolk Archaeology. 19 (3): 238–267. doi:10.5284/1077639 – via Archaeology Data Service. This source contains transcriptions of the English Life and Latin Life of Walstan.
- Pestell, Tim (2004). Landscapes of monastic foundation: the establishment of religious houses in East Anglia c. 650-1200. Woodbridge, Suffolk: Boydell Press. ISBN 9-781-84383-062-7.
- Robertson, Kellie (2005). The Laborer's Two Bodies: Literary and Legal Productions in Britain, 1350-1500. Basingstoke: Palgrave Macmillan. ISBN 9-781-13706-784-5.
- Shortt, L. M. (1914). Lives and legends of English saints. London: Methuen. OCLC 940469649.
- Société des Bollandistes (1898). Bibliotheca hagiographica latina: antiquae et mediae aetatis (in Latin). Vol. K–Z. Brussels. OCLC 17520487.
- Stanton, Richard (1887). A Menology of England and Wales. London: Burns & Oates. OCLC 982778548.
- Twinch, Carol (2015). Saint Walstan: The Third Search. Media Associates. ISBN 978-0-9521499-4-1.
