= Christopher Norwood =

British politician

Member of Parliament for Norwich South
- In office 15 October 1964 – 29 May 1970
- Preceded by: Geoffrey Rippon
- Succeeded by: Thomas Stuttaford

Personal details
- Born: 17 December 1932
- Died: 14 November 1972 (aged 39)
- Party: Labour
- Spouse: Beryl
- Children: 1
- Education: Whitgift School
- Alma mater: Gonville and Caius College, Cambridge (BA)

Christopher Bonnewell Burton Norwood (17 December 1932 – 14 November 1972) was a Labour Party politician in the United Kingdom.

Norwood was educated at Whitgift School, Croydon and Gonville and Caius College, Cambridge, whence he graduated with a BA in 1953. Following university Norwood worked firstly as a management trainee, then assumed various positions at the National Coal Board (NCB) before finding employment in the economic projection section of the Central Electricity Generating Board (CEGB). Having previously contested Sutton Coldfield in 1955 and Bromsgrove in 1959, at the 1964 general election he was elected as the Member of Parliament (MP) for Norwich South, serving until he stood down in 1970. Norwood died suddenly two years later aged 39, leaving behind one son by his ex-wife Beryl.

== Footnotes ==
Parliament of the United Kingdom
Preceded by Geoffrey Rippon	Member of Parliament for Norwich South; 1964–1970	Succeeded by Thomas Stuttaford
