= Clive Lewis (politician) =

British Labour politician (born 1971)

Clive Lewis MP
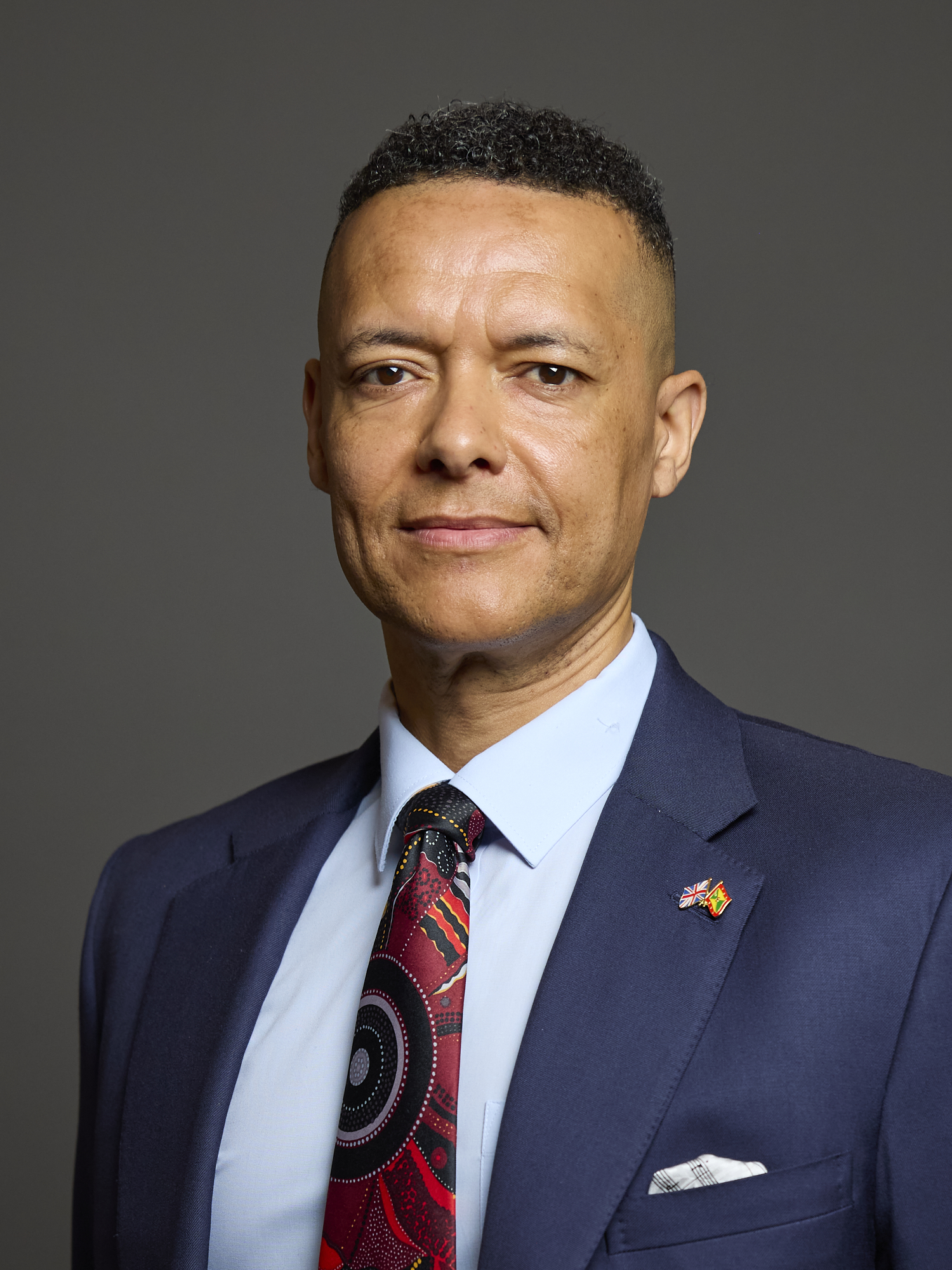
- Official portrait, 2024

Shadow Minister for Sustainable Economics
- In office 12 January 2018 – 9 April 2020
- Leader: Jeremy Corbyn
- Preceded by: Office established
- Succeeded by: Office abolished

Shadow Secretary of State for Business, Energy and Industrial Strategy
- In office 6 October 2016 – 8 February 2017
- Leader: Jeremy Corbyn
- Preceded by: Jon Trickett (Note: As Shadow Secretary of State for Business, Innovation and Skills. Barry Gardiner preceded Lewis as Energy and Climate Change.)
- Succeeded by: Rebecca Long-Bailey

Shadow Secretary of State for Defence
- In office 27 June 2016 – 6 October 2016
- Leader: Jeremy Corbyn
- Preceded by: Emily Thornberry
- Succeeded by: Nia Griffith

Member of Parliament for Norwich South
- Incumbent
- Assumed office 7 May 2015
- Preceded by: Simon Wright
- Majority: 13,239 (29.3%)

Personal details
- Born: Clive Anthony Lewis; 11 September 1971 (age 55) London, England
- Party: Labour
- Other political affiliations: Momentum Labour
- Spouse: Katy Steel (m. 2017)
- Children: 1
- Education: University of Bradford; Royal Military Academy Sandhurst
- Website: Official website

Military service
- Allegiance: United Kingdom
- Branch/service: British Army (Territorial Army)
- Years of service: 2006–2009
- Rank: Captain, (Territorial Army)
- Unit: 7th Battalion, The Rifles
- Battles/wars: Operation Herrick

Clive Anthony Lewis (born 11 September 1971) is a British Labour politician who has been the Member of Parliament (MP) for Norwich South since 2015. Lewis was a candidate for Leader of the Labour Party in the 2020 leadership election. Lewis is aligned with Mainstream, a network launched in September 2025 and whose founding statement he signed.

He previously served as vice-president of the National Union of Students, worked as a TV reporter for BBC News and served as an infantry officer with the Army Reserve. Lewis served a three-month tour of duty in Afghanistan in 2009.

Lewis became shadow defence secretary in June 2016, and shadow business secretary in October 2016. Lewis left the Shadow Cabinet in 2017 in protest over the Labour Party's decision to whip its MPs into voting to trigger Article 50, but re-joined the front bench a year later as shadow minister for sustainable economics. He stood in the 2020 Labour Party leadership election, but did not receive the required 22 parliamentarian nominations, and withdrew.

Lewis has written extensively about the climate crisis, race, and democracy. He has argued that Britain is built on forgetting its imperial history, stating that this "forgetting" is crucial to the "British state – the Union, an unwritten constitution, and even our voting system".

== Early life and education ==
Clive Lewis was born on 11 September 1971 in London. He grew up on a council estate in Northampton, the son of a single father from Grenada and a mother from England. He was the first member of his family to attend university, studying economics at the University of Bradford before being elected student union president, and later vice-president of the National Union of Students (NUS). In November 1995, he was a signatory to a letter that argued for the abolition of student loans.

Lewis was temporarily suspended from the role of vice-president of the NUS in 1996 by its president, Jim Murphy, for publicly supporting concerns about tuition fees. Murphy's actions were condemned by Ken Livingstone, then a Labour MP. Lewis ran for president of the National Union of Students in 1996 on a platform of unfunded full grants and free education, and lost the election to Douglas Trainer.

== Early career ==
After completing a postgraduate diploma in journalism, Lewis worked on local newspapers in Northampton and Milton Keynes, and was then accepted into the BBC's News Trainee Scheme. He went on to work as a broadcast journalist in Nottingham, Norwich, and Coventry. He then became the main reporter on the BBC's Politics Show East.

Lewis joined the Army Reserve, passing out of the Royal Military Academy Sandhurst in 2006 as an infantry officer with The Rifles. In 2009, he served a three-month tour of duty in Afghanistan. In an opinion piece he wrote years later, Lewis said "despite being on the left, and despite being told in the cadets that 'there ain't no black in the union jack', I still opted to serve". Shortly after returning from his tour of duty, he experienced depression, saying "I just felt like I was being crushed by it all." He received counselling through the Ministry of Defence and recovered.

== Parliamentary career ==
=== Candidate ===
Lewis was selected as the Labour Party's prospective parliamentary candidate for Norwich South at the party's hustings in November 2011, beating other candidates including the musician Dave Rowntree. Norwich South had been won by Simon Wright of the Liberal Democrats in the 2010 general election with a majority of just over 300 votes, defeating former Home Secretary and Education Secretary Charles Clarke.

In April 2015, during an interview with the New Statesman, in response to a prediction that Norwich South was 97 per cent likely to vote Labour, Lewis said "I’m more worried about complacency. I mean, in the multiverse there’s still 3 universes in a 100 where there’s a Green MP in Norwich, so anything could happen. I could be caught with my pants down behind a goat with Ed Miliband at the other end – well, hopefully that won’t happen.". He subsequently apologised for the remark, saying he was sincerely sorry if anyone had been offended by the comment.

Lewis opposed the Labour Party's position on immigration. Locally, Lewis supported the campaign to prevent the Hewett School, a comprehensive school in Norwich, from being turned into an academy.

=== 1st term (2015–2017) ===
At the 2015 general election, Lewis was elected MP for Norwich South with 39.3% of the vote and a majority of 7,654. In his victory speech, Lewis declared New Labour to be "dead and buried" and promised to stand up for Norwich's most vulnerable against an "onslaught of cuts" by the governing Conservative Party.

In his maiden speech, Lewis brought attention to the Government's plan to allow Housing Association homes to be bought by individuals. He accused the Government of forcibly asset-stripping housing associations, stating the policy would "further segregate" Norwich as well as increase the number of homes that were owned "as mere units of speculation".

In June 2015, Lewis was elected Chair of the All Party Parliamentary Humanist Group. In the same month, he became a patron of the Anti-Academies Alliance.

In December 2015, Lewis voted against airstrikes in Syria.

Lewis was one of 36 Labour MPs to nominate Jeremy Corbyn as a candidate in the 2015 Labour leadership election. Corbyn credited Lewis with getting his nominations "off the ground". Lewis has been described as an ally of Corbyn, who was elected leader. In September 2015, he was appointed to the Labour frontbench as a shadow minister in the Energy and Climate Change team.

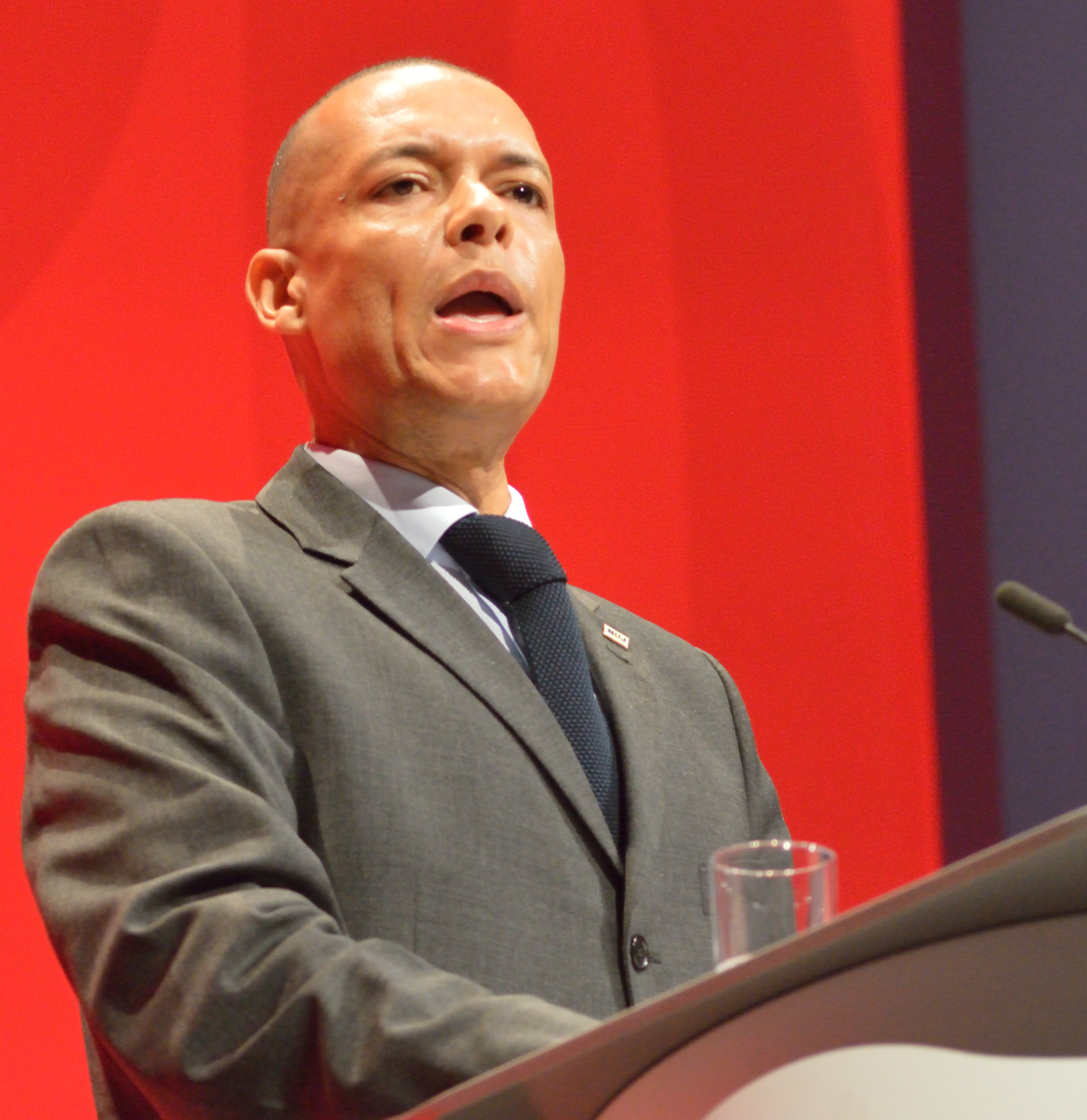
Lewis speaking at the 2016 Labour Party Conference

Following resignations from Corbyn's shadow cabinet after the 2016 EU referendum, Lewis was appointed as shadow defence secretary. In September 2016, at the Labour Party's 2016 Conference, when Lewis was preparing to give his first speech as shadow defence secretary, a section of his speech announcing that he "would not seek to change" Labour's current policy on nuclear weapons was changed by Corbyn's communications advisor Seumas Milne. Lewis was informed of the change by a sticky note. A month later, Corbyn removed Lewis from the defence brief, replacing him with Nia Griffith. Lewis was then appointed as shadow business secretary, with the move viewed as a tactical demotion.

On 8 February 2017, Lewis resigned from the shadow cabinet, citing the Labour Party's decision to whip its MPs to vote to trigger Article 50 to start Brexit negotiations.

In April 2017, Lewis was one of thirteen MPs to vote against triggering the 2017 general election.

=== 2nd term (2017–2019) ===
At the snap 2017 general election, Lewis was re-elected to Parliament as MP for Norwich South with an increased vote share of 61% and an increased majority of 15,596.

At the 2017 Labour Conference, video footage taken at a fringe event emerged in which Lewis told the male actor Sam Swann to "get on your knees, bitch". Lewis' language attracted criticism from Labour colleagues. Stella Creasy, a Labour colleague, said: "It's not OK. Even if it's meant as a joke, it reinforces menace that men have the physical power to force compliance." Swann told The Guardian: "It is clearly jovial and nothing vicious". Swann also said "The whole event was so brilliant for seeing MPs letting their hair down and fucking around with people who support them. I think Clive Lewis is an absolute legend." Lewis subsequently tweeted an apology, in which he described his behaviour as "offensive and unacceptable". At the same conference, Lewis was accused of groping a woman at Momentum's The World Transformed event. In response, Lewis said he was "pretty taken aback" by the accusation and "completely" and "categorically" denied it. On 12 December 2017, he was cleared by Labour's National Executive Committee sexual harassment panel.

In January 2018, Lewis was reappointed to Labour's shadow frontbench as a shadow Treasury minister, responsible for sustainable economics.

Lewis supported Labour activist Marc Wadsworth, who was expelled from the party in April 2018 for bringing it into disrepute. Wadsworth had accused Jewish Labour MP Ruth Smeeth of working "hand in hand" with the media at the launch of the Chakrabarti report into anti-Semitism in the party. Lewis, who had provided a character reference for Wadsworth, opposed the decision to expel him. Jewish students at the University of East Anglia, in Lewis's constituency, criticised him for his stance, whilst the Union of Jewish Students (UJS) issued an open letter to Lewis, who they believed had "categorically failed" Jewish people.

At the 2019 Labour conference, Lewis published a paper which accused the party of a "moral failure" on migrants' rights and called for the party to adopt an open border immigration policy with the European Union. He also accused party leader Jeremy Corbyn of being "silent on detention centres" and the "no recourse to public funds" policy of the Conservative government.

=== 3rd term (2019–2024) ===
At the 2019 general election, Lewis was again re-elected, with a decreased vote share of 53.7% and a majority of 12,760.

In December 2019, he announced that he would run in the 2020 Labour Party leadership election following Corbyn's resignation. Despite a petition by members and supporters to get him on the ballot due to his democratisation and electoral reform policies, he received only five of the necessary 22 nominations from Labour MPs, and withdrew from the contest, which allowed his five supporters to nominate other candidates before nominations closed on 13 January.

In September 2019, alongside Caroline Lucas MP, Lewis tabled the Green New Deal Bill (formally known as the Decarbonisation and Economic Strategy Bill). The Bill was tabled to "change the way the government manages the economy to enable extensive public and private investment in a Green New Deal".

In February 2022 Lewis was appointed to the Environmental Audit Committee, which explores the extent to which the policies and programmes of government departments and non-departmental public bodies contribute to environmental protection and sustainable development.

A few days before Liz Truss became prime minister in September 2022, Lewis said that the government had the power to address the United Kingdom cost-of-living crisis through measures such as: a windfall tax, nationalisation of energy companies, implementing retrofits of homes, and establishing a universal basic income and universal basic services. He said such things would not be implemented under Truss because, "it will not favour the private interests who are benefiting from the cost of living crisis, such as the funders of dark money think tanks that appear to be driving the incoming Truss government's agenda."

In September 2022, following the death of Queen Elizabeth II, Lewis wrote an article criticising the monarchy and the "flawed reality of the very limited democracy we inhabit". Lewis stated that he despaired at the queues to see the Queen's coffin and noted that the royal succession "is as much about coercion as consent". He also criticised the language of "duty" and "sacrifice" used about the royal family, which he said to be a lie, and he called for constitutional, democratic reform. In the title of the article he referred to himself as a republican. Ahead of the coronation of King Charles III, Lewis said that the monarchy had exempted itself from 160 different pieces of legislation. He stated that exemptions to the taxes people must pay have allowed the King to amass a fortune of almost £2 billion "at a time when almost three million children, his subjects, face abject poverty".

In March 2023 Lewis led a Westminster Hall debate on the UK's role in promoting financial security and reducing inequality in the Caribbean, where he urged the Government to enter "meaningful negotiations with the governments of the Caribbean" about reparations for Britain's role in the transatlantic slave trade.

=== 4th term (2024–) ===
At the 2024 general election, Lewis was again re-elected, with a decreased vote share of 47.6% and an increased majority of 13,239.

Lewis prefaced his parliamentary affirmation stating that he took his "oath under protest and in the hope that one day my fellow citizens will democratically decide to live in a republic". He subsequently remade his affirmation having omitted the words "his heirs and successors" on the first occasion. He was faced with a fine and potentially losing his seat if he refused to do so. He prefaced his second affirmation by stating: "I was elected to parliament to represent my constituents and our country to the best of my ability to defend democracy and uphold human rights and one day I hope all members of parliament will be entitled to swear an oath of allegiance based on those values."

Alongside a majority of the Labour MPs, Lewis voted against an amendment to the King's Speech that sought to "abolish the two-child limit to Universal Credit; recognise that this policy is pushing children into poverty". Seven MPs were suspended from the Labour Party for voting for the amendment by Keir Starmer, while Starmer himself abstained, as did chancellor Rachel Reeves.

In response to the 2024 United Kingdom riots, Lewis spoke at two anti-racism protests in Norwich – one outside a hotel housing asylum seekers, and another in the city centre.

In September 2025, he publicly stated that Keir Starmer "doesn't seem up to the job" following the controversy surrounding the resignation of ambassador Peter Mandelson.

Lewis was a signatory of the founding statement of Mainstream, a which organises for centre-left ideas and policy within the Labour Party. He is no longer a member of the Socialist Campaign Group of MPs, and convenes a series of policy seminars in partnership with Mainstream.

In November 2025, he publicly called for Keir Starmer to step down as Prime Minister, arguing that Mayor of Greater Manchester Andy Burnham should succeed him. He became the first sitting Labour MP to call for Starmer’s resignation. He later offered to resign his parliamentary seat should Burnham decide to challenge Starmer, a move that would trigger a by-election in his constituency.

== Personal life ==
Clive Lewis married Yorkshire school teacher and actress Katy Steel in May 2017. Their daughter Zana was born in 2018.

== Bibliography ==
- Extinction Rebellion, ed. (2019). "Chapter 26: A Green New Deal". This Is Not a Drill: An Extinction Rebellion Handbook. Penguin Books. pp. 155–161. ISBN 9780141991443.

== Notes ==
Parliament of the United Kingdom
Preceded by Simon Wright	Member of Parliament for Norwich South; 2015–present	Incumbent
Political offices
Preceded by Emily Thornberry	Shadow Secretary of State for Defence; 2016	Succeeded by Nia Griffith
Preceded by Jon Trickett as Shadow Secretary of State for Business, Innovation and Skills	Shadow Secretary of State for Business, Energy and Industrial Strategy; 2016–2017	Succeeded by Rebecca Long-Bailey
Preceded by Barry Gardiner as Shadow Secretary of State for Energy and Climate Change	Shadow Secretary of State for Business, Energy and Industrial Strategy; 2016–2017	Succeeded by Rebecca Long-Bailey
