= Andrew Stuttaford =

British-American solicitor and journalist (born 1958)

Andrew Irving Ropner Stuttaford (born 22 March 1958) is a British-American solicitor, journalist, editor, and former banker.

The eldest of the three sons of Dr Thomas Stuttaford and Pamela Ropner, he was educated at Brasenose College, Oxford, graduating BA in jurisprudence in 1979, and gaining a Licence spéciale en droit européen from l’Institut d’Etudes Européennes of the Free University of Brussels in 1980. After qualifying as a solicitor, for nearly forty years he worked in international financial markets, lastly from 2002 to 2020 as President of the U.S. subsidiary of ABG Sundal Collier, a Nordic investment bank. He was also a part-time journalist and for many years a contributing editor of National Review, writing on politics, economics, and culture, before going full-time in 2020. He became a Fellow of the National Review Institute and is an editor of National Review Capital Matters.

Stuttaford has written for The Wall Street Journal, The New Criterion, The Weekly Standard, and Standpoint, among many others.

Writing about Harriet Harman in August 2015, he asked "Who is this nut?" and predicted that Jeremy Corbyn would be the next leader of the Labour Party.

He is a nephew of Sir William Stuttaford.
