= Bawburgh =

Village and civil parish in the South Norfolk district of Norfolk, England

Coordinates: 52.633°N 1.183°E

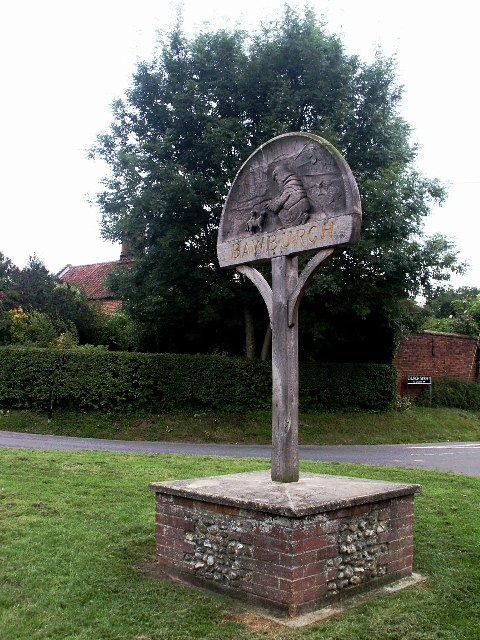
- Signpost in Bawburgh

- Location within Norfolk
- Area: 5.82 km^{2} (2.25 sq mi)
- Population: 595 (2011)
  - Density: 102/km^{2} (260/sq mi)
- Civil parish: Bawburgh
- District: South Norfolk
- Shire county: Norfolk
- Region: East
- Country: England
- Sovereign state: United Kingdom
- Post town: NORWICH
- Postcode district: NR9
- Dialling code: 01603
- Police: Norfolk
- Fire: Norfolk
- Ambulance: East of England
- UK Parliament: South Norfolk

Bawburgh (/ˈbeɪbər, ˈbɔːbərə/) is a village and civil parish in the South Norfolk district of Norfolk, England. It is in the valley of the River Yare about 5 miles (8.0 km) west of Norwich city centre. According to the 2001 census it had a population of 466, increasing to 595 at the 2011 census. Bawburgh is very close to the relatively new Norfolk and Norwich University Hospital and the Bowthorpe Estate.

The name is first recorded as Bauenburc in 1086. The mill at the centre of the village was the original site of the manufacture of Colman's mustard.

== Church ==
The church of Bawburgh St Mary and St Walstan is one of 124 existing round-tower churches in Norfolk. St Walstan's Day is celebrated on an annual basis with a church service and walk to the nearby St Walstan's Well. The church is a Grade I listed building.. There is a canonical sundial on the south wall.

Bawburgh is a significant location in the legend of St Walstan, the 10th-11th century patron saint of farm labourers. According to legend, Walstan was born at Bawburgh (or possibly Blythburgh in Suffolk) into a Saxon noble family circa 970, but at the age of 12 gave up his privileged life, choosing instead to work as a farm labourer in Taverham. His initial journey on foot from Bawburgh to Taverham took Walstan through Costessey, where he donated his noble garments to two passing peasants. After many years, Walstan's imminent death was foretold by an angel and he asked a priest for the last rites; no water was available but a miraculous spring welled up on the spot. On his death, Walstan's body was returned to Bawburgh on a cart drawn by two white oxen. The oxen stopped at Costessey, where a second spring gushed forth and at Bawburgh, where a third spring appeared. St Walstan's Well at Bawburgh is the only one of the legendary springs that remains identifiable. Walstan's body was taken into the church and Bawburgh became the centre of a cult of pilgrimage, with several miracles recorded.
