= Saint Blida =

East Anglian saint

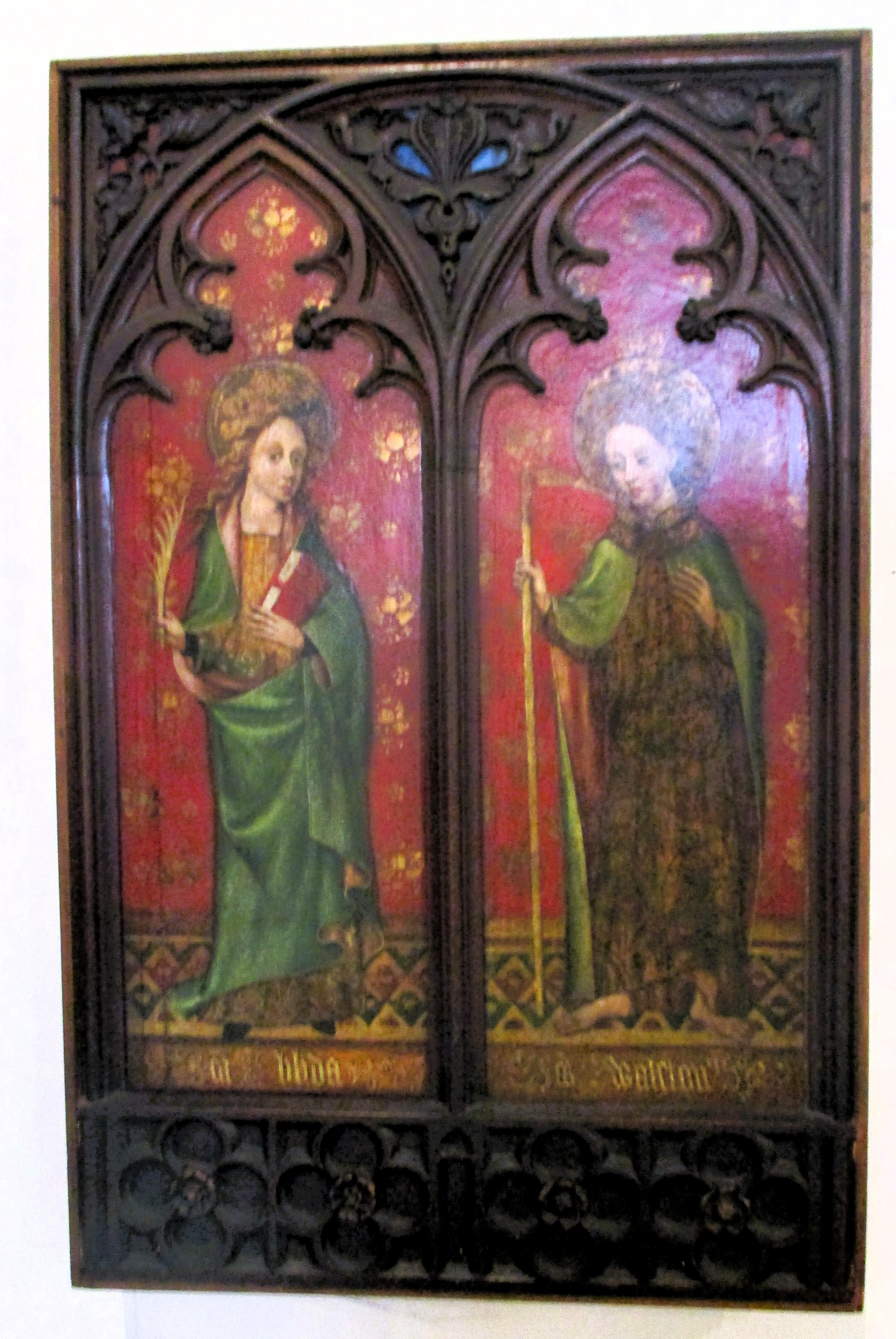
- The saint and her son Saint Walstan depicted on a mediaeval rood screen panel at St Mary Magdalene, Norwich
- Died: Martham, Norfolk
- Canonized: Pre-Congregation

Blida (recorded as Blithe in some sources) was an Anglo-Saxon princess, known for being the mother of Saint Walstan, whose cult was celebrated during the Middle Ages in the English county of Norfolk. She is associated with the Norfolk village of Martham, where she is considered to have been buried, and where there was once a chapel.

== Life ==
Blida lived in the vill of Bawburgh, where her son Walstan was born. Descended from royalty, her husband is named as being Benedict. She was a kinswoman of the English king Æthelred the Unready and his son Edmund Ironside. Following her death and burial at Martham, Norfolk, a chapel was dedicated in her honour, and bequests were made to her for over 400 years. At the age of 12, Walstan renounced his life of privilege and with his parents' permission determined to devote his life to one of prayer, although not as a monk.

The anonymous English Life gives Walstan's birthplace as "Blyborow town" or Blythburgh, Suffolk, and relates that he was the son of a king; as a young prince he might suddenly return home, which would have threatened the contract established between himself and the farmer in Taverham.

Blida was represented on a painted panel of a rood screen, formerly in the church of St James the Less, Pockthorpe in Norwich. She is depicted with her crown, holding a book and palm. Blida is also depicted in a chancel window at North Tuddenham. She had no known feast day.

The south aisle chapel at the parish church in Martham is a prayer corner dedicated to the saint, who may have been buried there in the 11th century,

== Sources ==
- Blair, John (2002). "A Handlist of Anglo-Saxon Saints". In Thacker, Alan; Sharpe, Richard (eds.). Local Saints and Local Churches in the Early Medieval West. Oxford: Oxford University Press. ISBN 9-780-19820-394-0.
- Farmer, David Hugh (2011). The Oxford Dictionary of Saints. Oxford: Oxford University Press. ISBN 9-780-19959-660-7.
- Robertson, Kellie (2005). The Laborer's Two Bodies: Literary and Legal Productions in Britain, 1350-1500. Basingstoke: Palgrave Macmillan. ISBN 9-781-13706-784-5.
- Stanton, Richard (1887). A Menology of England and Wales. London: Burns & Oates. OCLC 982778548.
- Twinch, Carol (2015). Saint Walstan: The Third Search. Media Associates. ISBN 978-0-9521499-4-1.
