= Charles Clarke =

British Labour politician (born 1950)

The Right Honourable Charles Clarke
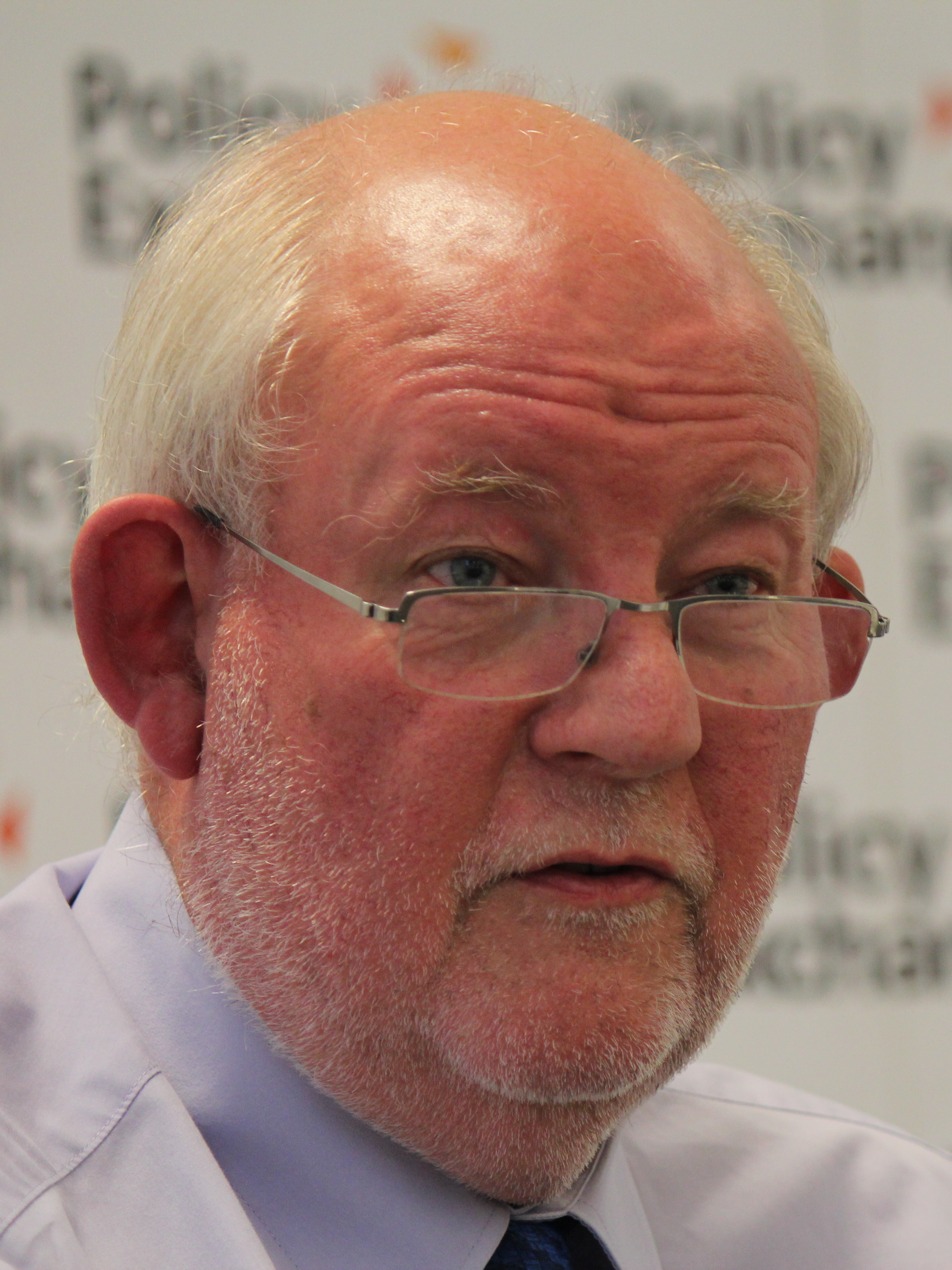
- Clarke in 2014

Home Secretary
- In office 15 December 2004 – 5 May 2006
- Prime Minister: Tony Blair
- Preceded by: David Blunkett
- Succeeded by: John Reid

Secretary of State for Education and Skills
- In office 24 October 2002 – 15 December 2004
- Prime Minister: Tony Blair
- Preceded by: Estelle Morris
- Succeeded by: Ruth Kelly

Minister without Portfolio Chairman of the Labour Party
- In office 9 June 2001 – 24 October 2002
- Prime Minister: Tony Blair
- Preceded by: Peter Mandelson
- Succeeded by: John Reid

Minister of State for Home Affairs
- In office 29 July 1999 – 9 June 2001
- Prime Minister: Tony Blair
- Preceded by: Baron Williams
- Succeeded by: Keith Bradley

Parliamentary Under-Secretary of State for Lifelong Learning
- In office 28 July 1998 – 29 July 1999
- Prime Minister: Tony Blair
- Preceded by: Kim Howells
- Succeeded by: Malcolm Wicks

Member of Parliament for Norwich South
- In office 1 May 1997 – 12 April 2010
- Preceded by: John Garrett
- Succeeded by: Simon Wright

Personal details
- Born: Charles Rodway Clarke; 21 September 1950 (age 76) London, England
- Party: Labour
- Spouse: Carol Pearson
- Education: King's College, Cambridge

Charles Rodway Clarke (born 21 September 1950) is a British Labour Party politician who held various Cabinet positions under Prime Minister Tony Blair from 2001 to 2006, lastly as Home Secretary from December 2004 to May 2006. Clarke was the Member of Parliament (MP) for Norwich South from 1997 to 2010.

== Early life ==
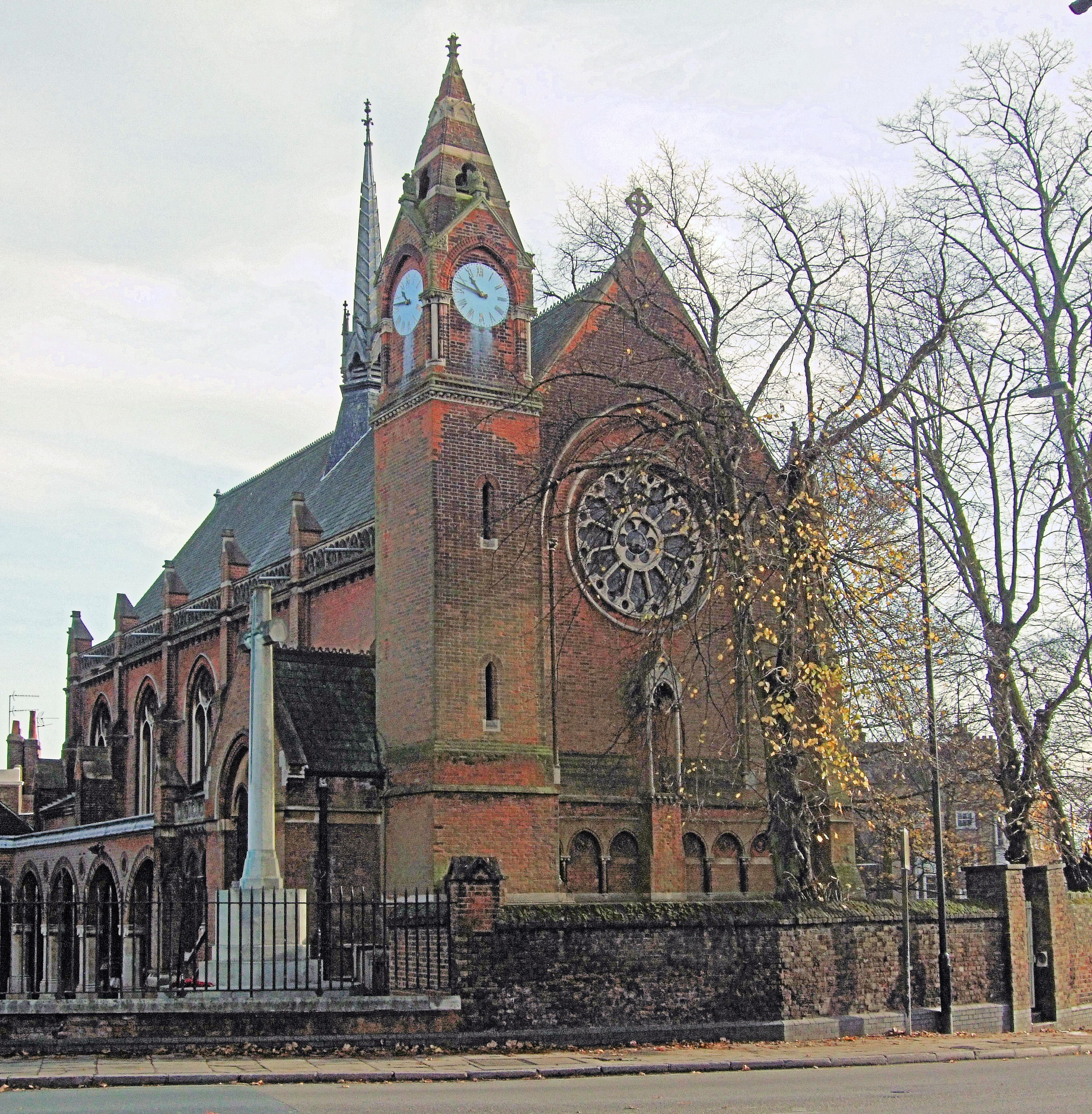
Highgate School

The son of Civil Service Permanent Secretary Sir Richard Clarke, Charles Rodway Clarke was born in London on 21 September 1950. He attended the fee-paying Highgate School where he was Head Boy. He then studied Mathematics and Economics at King's College, Cambridge, where he also served as the president of the Cambridge Students' Union.

A member of the Broad Left faction, he was president of the National Union of Students from 1975 to 1977. Clarke had joined the Labour Party by then and was active in the Clause Four group. Clarke was the British representative on the Permanent Commission for the World Youth Festival (Cuba) from 1977 to 1978.

=== Local government ===
He was elected as a local councillor in the London Borough of Hackney, being chair of its Housing Committee and vice chair of economic development from 1980 to 1986. He worked as a researcher, and later chief of staff, for Labour Party leader Neil Kinnock from February 1981 to 1992. He was Kinnock's chief of staff from 1985 onwards.

His long association with Kinnock and with the general election defeat in 1992 was expected to handicap him in his career, but Clarke bounced back. He spent the mid-1990s away from national politics, working in the private sector – from 1992 to 1997, he was chief executive of Quality Public Affairs, a public affairs management consultancy – and subsequently emerged as a high flyer under the Labour leadership of Tony Blair.

== Member of Parliament ==
Elected to the House of Commons in the Labour landslide of 1997, Clarke served just over a year on the back benches, before joining the government as a junior education minister in July 1998. He moved to the Home Office in 1999, and joined the Cabinet as Minister without Portfolio and Party Chair following the 2001 general election.

=== Education Secretary ===
He returned to Education as Secretary of State on 24 October 2002, after the resignation of Estelle Morris. As Education Secretary, he defended Oxbridge, encouraged the establishment of specialist secondary schools, and allegedly suggested that the state should not fund "unproductive" humanities research.

In 2003, he said in a speech to University College, Worcester: "Universities exist to enable the British economy and society to deal with the challenges posed by the increasingly rapid process of global change." He explained:

I argue that what I described as the medieval concept of a community of scholars seeking truth is not in itself a justification for the state to put money into that. We might do it at say a level of a hundredth of what we do now and have one university of medieval seekers after truth that we thought were very good, to support them as an adornment to our society. But I don't think that we will have the level of funding that we do now for universities unless we can justify it on some kind of basis of the type I have described.

He also oversaw the introduction of Bills to enable universities in parts of Britain to charge top-up fees, despite a Labour manifesto commitment that it would not introduce such fees and indeed had 'legislated to prevent them'.

=== Home Secretary ===
Following the first resignation of David Blunkett on 15 December 2004, Clarke was appointed Home Secretary, one of the senior positions in the Cabinet.

He was swiftly at the centre of attention for his advocacy of proposals for countering terrorism. Critics suggest that his reforms to the judicial system undermine centuries of British legal precedent dating back to the 1215 Magna Carta, particularly the right to a fair trial and trial by jury. He was also criticised for the Identity Cards Act 2006, seen by some as serious infringement of privacy, but Clarke insisted that identity cards were necessary to combat terrorism.

During the 2005 British Presidency of the European Union, Clarke pressed other member states to pass a directive to require communications data to be stored for law enforcement purposes. The directive was criticised as infringing civil liberties and privacy, and critics also noted that the directive had been approved very quickly.

In 2006, Clarke scrapped an ex-gratia discretionary scheme under which compensation to those wrongly convicted of a criminal offence could be awarded. Professor John Spencer QC, of Cambridge University described the move as "monstrous".

=== Foreign prisoners scandal ===
On 25 April 2006 it emerged that 1,023 foreign prisoners had been freed without being considered for deportation. Among the offenders, five had been convicted of committing sex offences against children, seven had served time for other sex offences, 57 for violent offences and two for manslaughter. There were also 41 burglars, 20 drug importers, 54 convicted of assault and 27 of indecent assault.

Former Home Secretary David Blunkett supported Clarke but said that "heads should roll" over the scandal, though many of the releases had occurred during his period as Home Secretary. The Home Office later stated that 288 were released from prison between August 2005 and March 2006, which implied that prisoners continued to be released after the matter had been brought to the attention of the government.

=== Out of government ===
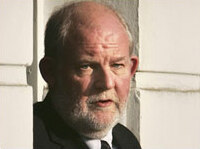
Clarke the day after he was fired as Home Secretary

The foreign prisoners scandal led many to call for Clarke's resignation, not only from the opposition; Clarke reportedly offered to resign, but Tony Blair, the prime minister, refused to accept. However, in the wake of a poor Labour performance in the local council elections of 4 May 2006, Clarke was dismissed in a cabinet reshuffle, labelled the biggest cabinet upheaval in the history of the Blair governments, and was replaced by Defence Secretary John Reid. Having reputedly turned down the offer of Defence Secretary by Tony Blair, Clarke became a backbencher.

At the end of June 2006, he did a series of interviews in which he criticised John Reid for claiming that the Home Office was "unfit for purpose", and that the Prime Minister ought to have defended him to enable him to continue seeing through the reforms he had initiated when first appointed to the post. However, he did state that although Tony Blair had lost his sense of purpose, he wanted to see Blair continue as PM.

In September 2006, Clarke took up a consultancy post with a leading London law firm, leading to speculation he anticipated not returning to frontline politics.

=== Labour leadership controversy ===
On 8 September 2006, Clarke gave an interview to the Evening Standard in which he criticised the 'presumption' that Gordon Brown would succeed Tony Blair as prime minister, helping trigger further disputes about the Labour leadership. Clarke said of Brown's reaction to the leadership crisis, "A lot of people are very upset and cross about that. It was absolutely stupid – a stupid, stupid thing to do." He named Alan Milburn as a politician who had the stature to be prime minister instead of Brown.

Clarke furthered his attack on Brown in an interview with The Daily Telegraph on the following day, accusing Brown of being "a control freak", "deluded" and "uncollegiate".

Clarke with Alan Milburn set up The 2020 Vision website to discuss the direction of the Labour party after Tony Blair ceased being prime minister. Some observers saw this as a way for Gordon Brown's political opponents to create an axis against him. The website has since closed.

On 23 March 2008, Clarke published a list of 35 Labour held constituencies vulnerable to other parties if fewer than 7,500 voters switched parties away from Labour. This was interpreted by many as an attempt to force a leadership change on the Labour party.

On 4 September 2008, Clarke once again attacked Gordon Brown's performance as leader of the Labour Party and prime minister, claiming that he only had "months" to improve or else should face a leadership contest. However, when asked whether he would stand as a "Stalking horse" to draw out stronger candidates, he confirmed that he would not.

On 1 May 2009, Clarke joined David Blunkett in criticising Gordon Brown's leadership and declared that he was "ashamed" to be a Labour MP, citing the Damian McBride scandal. In September 2009, Clarke gave a speech in which he said that Brown should stand down as prime minister to help the Labour Party avoid "a hammering" at the 2010 General Election.

== Life after Parliament ==
Clarke lost his Parliamentary seat in the 2010 General Election by a margin of just 300 votes, and declared he was unlikely to stand again for Parliament.

On 20 September 2010, it was announced that Clarke had been appointed Visiting Professor to the School of Political, Social and International Studies at the University of East Anglia. The appointment was part-time and for an initial period of three years. Since November 2010, Clarke has also been Visiting Professor of Politics and Faith in the Department of Politics, Philosophy and Religion at Lancaster University. He is a Council Member of the European Council on Foreign Relations.

Clarke is a Senior Network Member at the European Leadership Network (ELN).

=== Too difficult box ===
Clarke introduced the idea of the "too difficult box"— an explanation why politicians often opt out of taking action to fix many serious political issues. It is focused on UK politics, but the book suggests that the principles apply to other countries. Clarke originally expounded his ideas in a series of lectures at the University of East Anglia in 2011. In 2014, he launched the book The 'Too Difficult' Box: The Big Issues Politicians Can't Crack. The introduction, conclusion and a chapter on immigration is written by Clarke. The rest of the book contains individual chapters (edited by Clarke) by past or current politicians or political commentators—each chapter covering a specific political issue considered to be in the too difficult box.

Some reasons Clarke that gives explaining why politicians find some issues too difficult to deal with are: difficulty identifying the problem; difficulty identifying the solution; difficulty working out how to implement a solution; difficulty overcoming vested interests; existing legal constraints; the lengthy process required to bring in legislation; and a lack of political energy.

== Personal life ==
Clarke married Carol Pearson, granddaughter of August Maramaa in Hackney, London, in 1984. They have two sons, both born in Hackney: Christopher Richard Clarke (born 1987) and Matthew Jack Clarke (born 1990). Previously resident in Norwich, they now live in Cambridge. Clarke speaks Cuban Spanish (a legacy of his student links with Cuba), French, and German.

In 2004, he became a fellow of the Royal Statistical Society to acknowledge its contribution to education and in memory of his father, who had been a statistician. Clarke is an avid supporter of Norwich City F.C..

In July 2018 he was awarded the honorary degree of Doctor of Civil Law (DCL) from the University of East Anglia.

Parliament of the United Kingdom
Preceded by John Garrett	Member of Parliament for Norwich South; 1997–2010	Succeeded by Simon Wright
Political offices
Preceded by John Randall	President of the National Union of Students; 1975–1977	Succeeded by Sue Slipman
Preceded by Peter Mandelson	Minister without Portfolio; 2001–2002	Succeeded by John Reid
Preceded by Estelle Morris	Secretary of State for Education and Skills; 2002–2004	Succeeded by Ruth Kelly
Preceded by David Blunkett	Home Secretary; 2004–2006	Succeeded by John Reid
