= Norwich South =

Parliamentary constituency in the United Kingdom, 1950 onwards

Coordinates: 52.62°N 1.27°E

- Borough constituency for the House of Commons
- Interactive map of boundaries since 2024
- Location within the East of England
- County: Norfolk
- Electorate: 73,301 (March 2020)
- Major settlements: Norwich

Current constituency
- Created: 1950
- Member of Parliament: Clive Lewis (Labour Party)
- Seats: One
- Created from: Norwich

Norwich South is a constituency in Norfolk represented in the House of Commons of the Parliament of the United Kingdom, (Note: A borough constituency (for the purposes of election expenses and type of returning officer)) since 2015 by Clive Lewis, of the Labour Party. (Note: As with all constituencies, the constituency elects one Member of Parliament (MP) by the first past the post system of election at least every five years.)

== Constituency profile ==
Norwich South is a constituency in Norfolk in the East of England. It covers the city centre of Norwich and the city's western and southern suburban neighbourhoods, including Norwich Over the Water, Thorpe Hamlet, Eaton and Bowthorpe.

Norwich is a historic city and was England's second-largest settlement after London until the industrial era. It is known for its medieval architecture and its traditional association with literature and the shoemaking industry. This constituency contains two universities, the University of East Anglia and the smaller Norwich University of the Arts, which together have around 20,000 students. Norwich South has below-average levels of wealth and is particularly deprived in the south-eastern and western neighbourhoods, which contain a high quantity of council housing. However, Eaton in the south-west is highly affluent with many large, detached houses. House prices across the constituency are generally lower than the regional and UK averages.

This constituency has a low proportion of older adults and a large student population owing to its universities; 17% of residents are between the ages of 18 and 24. Residents have below-average levels of household income and homeownership and the child poverty rate is high. They are generally well-educated and a high proportion work in the education and public sectors. The percentage claiming unemployment benefits is in line with the UK-wide figure. White people made up 86% of the population at the 2021 census.

At the local city council, the city centre is represented by Green Party councillors and most of the outer suburbs by Labour Party representatives, except Eaton, which elected Liberal Democrats. At the county council (which held elections in 2026) this pattern was largely repeated, except that the Green Party won the Labour-voting areas. Voters in Norwich South strongly supported remaining in the European Union in the 2016 referendum; an estimated 61% voted to remain compared to the UK-wide figure of 48%.

== History ==
The constituency was created by the Representation of the People Act 1948 for the 1950 general election, when the two-seat Norwich constituency was divided into Norwich North and Norwich South. The Labour MP for this seat from 1997 to 2010 was Charles Clarke who served in the cabinet for five years from 2001 to 2006, first as Minister without Portfolio, then as Secretary of State for Education and Skills and latterly as Home Secretary.

Norwich South was Labour's safest seat in Norfolk until 2005. Although it was lost to the Conservatives in 1983, it was regained by Labour in 1987 and was the only Labour seat in Norfolk until 1997. In 2005 the Labour majority was cut by over 5000, leaving Norwich North as the safest Labour seat in the county.

At the 2010 election, the seat was considered a three-way marginal between the incumbent Labour party, the Liberal Democrats and the Conservatives. The seat was also targeted by the Green Party. The Liberal Democrats won the seat, with the lowest percentage share of the vote in a constituency in the 2010 election. The loss was considered an embarrassment for the Labour Party as it was the seat of a former Home Secretary.

In the 2015 election, Norwich South was one of the Green Party's target seats, and due to the tiny majority of just 310 votes for the Liberal Democrat Simon Wright over Labour in the previous election, it was a key Labour target. In the event, Wright came fourth with under half his 2010 vote, behind the Greens, Conservatives and Labour, whose left-wing candidate Clive Lewis won the seat with a 10.6% swing from the Liberal Democrats to Labour. The Green Party share of the vote actually fell by 1% compared to 2010, with the Conservative vote slightly increasing.

In the 2017 election, UKIP did not contest the seat but endorsed the Conservatives. Clive Lewis increased Labour's vote share by 22 percentage points to win 31,311 votes (61.0%), the most votes any party has ever won in the constituency. This happened despite the Conservative share of the vote also increasing by 7.1%. The swing was entirely from the Liberal Democrats (who had held the seat from 2010 to 2015) whose vote fell to 5.5%, and the Green Party (who had made the seat a top target in 2015) who dropped to 2.9%, their worst result in Norwich South since 1997.

Although Lewis's share of the vote fell in the 2019 general election, he still held the seat with a comfortable majority of 24.7%, which he increased to 29.3% at the 2024 general election.

== Boundaries and boundary changes ==
=== Historic ===
==== 1950–1974 ====
- The County Borough of Norwich wards of Ber Street, Conesford, Earlham, Eaton, Lakenham, Nelson, St Stephen, and Town Close.

==== 1974–1983 ====
- The County Borough of Norwich wards of Bowthorpe, Earlham, Eaton, Lakenham, Nelson, St Stephen, Town Close, and University.

Further to the Second Periodic Review of Westminster Constituencies a redistribution of seats was enacted in 1970. However, in the case of the two Norwich constituencies, this was superseded before the February 1974 general election by the Parliamentary Constituencies (Norwich) Order 1973 which followed on from a revision of the County Borough of Norwich wards in 1971, resulting in a realignment of the boundary with Norwich North.

==== 1983–1997 ====
- The City of Norwich wards of Bowthorpe, Eaton, Heigham, Henderson, Lakenham, Mancroft, Nelson, St Stephen, Thorpe Hamlet, Town Close, and University.

Extended northwards, gaining southern parts of Norwich North.

==== 1997–2010 ====
- The City of Norwich wards of Bowthorpe, Eaton, Heigham, Henderson, Lakenham, Mancroft, Nelson, St Stephen, Thorpe Hamlet, Town Close, and University; and
- The District of South Norfolk wards of Cringleford and Colney, and New Costessey.

The two District of South Norfolk wards were transferred from the constituency of South Norfolk.

==== 2010–2024 ====
Map of boundaries 2010–2024

- The City of Norwich wards of Bowthorpe, Eaton, Lakenham, Mancroft, Nelson, Thorpe Hamlet, Town Close, University, and Wensum; and
- The District of South Norfolk ward of New Costessey.

The villages of Cringleford and Colney were returned to South Norfolk. In Norwich, the part of the Crome ward around Morse Road became part of Norwich North, while the area around Mousehold Street in Thorpe Hamlet moved to Norwich South.

Following their review of parliamentary constituencies in Norfolk that concluded in 2007 and came into effect for the 2010 general election, the Boundary Commission for England created a slightly modified Norwich South constituency. The changes were necessary to re-align the constituency boundaries with the new local government ward boundaries introduced in South Norfolk and Norwich in 2003 and 2004 respectively and to take account of Norfolk being awarded an additional, ninth constituency by the Boundary Commission.

=== Current ===
Further to the 2023 review of Westminster constituencies, which came into effect for the 2024 general election, the contents of the constituency are unchanged, but there were minor changes to the boundaries following modifications to local authority ward boundaries. The area of Costessey around Richmond Road was transferred from South Norfolk, and the area of Crome (formerly Thorpe Hamlet) ward around Mousehold Street was transferred back to Norwich North.

There had been an earlier proposal in the Boundary Commission draft recommendations to transfer the whole of the Old Costessey ward over to the Norwich South constituency and move Thorpe Hamlet into Norwich North, but that was scrapped, according to the Local Democracy Reporting Service. (A proposal in the 2018 previous boundary review to move Cringleford and Old Costessey into Norwich South and Wensum ward into Norwich North was also scrapped).

== Members of Parliament ==
Norwich prior to 1950

Election	Member	Party
1950	Henry Strauss	Conservative
1955	Geoffrey Rippon	Conservative
1964	Christopher Norwood	Labour
1970	Thomas Stuttaford	Conservative
1974	John Garrett	Labour
1983	John Powley	Conservative
1987	John Garrett	Labour
1997	Charles Clarke	Labour
2010	Simon Wright	Liberal Democrats
2015	Clive Lewis	Labour

== Elections ==
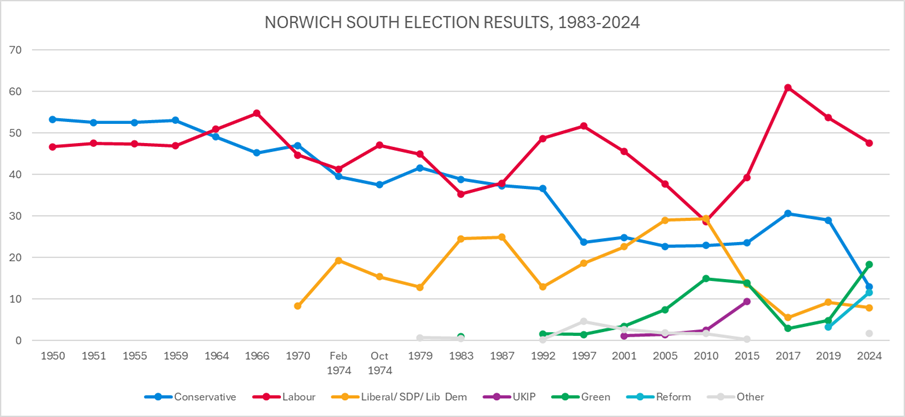
Election results 1950-2024

=== Elections in the 2020s ===
General election 2024: Norwich South
Party	Candidate	Votes	%	±%
Labour	Clive Lewis	21,484	47.6	–5.9
Green	Jamie Osborn	8,245	18.3	+13.5
Conservative	David Thomas	5,806	12.9	−16.1
Reform	Graham Burton	5,227	11.6	+8.4
Liberal Democrats	Sean Bennett	3,577	7.9	−1.6
Party of Women	Linda Law	455	1.0	N/A
Independent	Elizabeth Davey	301	0.7	N/A
Majority		13,239	29.3	+4.8
Turnout		45,095	59.0	–11.0
Registered electors		76,381		
Labour hold		Swing	▼9.7	

=== Elections in the 2010s ===
2019 notional result
Party	Vote	%
Labour	27,464	53.5
Conservative	14,881	29.0
Liberal Democrats	4,851	9.5
Green	2,477	4.8
Brexit Party	1,635	3.2
Turnout	51,308	70.0
Electorate	73,301	

General election 2019: Norwich South
Party	Candidate	Votes	%	±%
Labour	Clive Lewis	27,766	53.7	–7.3
Conservative	Michael Spencer	15,006	29.0	–1.6
Liberal Democrats	James Wright	4,776	9.2	+3.7
Green	Catherine Rowett	2,469	4.8	+1.9
Brexit Party	Sandy Gilchrist	1,656	3.2	N/A
Majority		12,760	24.7	–5.7
Turnout		51,673	66.4	–2.8
Labour hold		Swing		

General election 2017: Norwich South
Party	Candidate	Votes	%	±%
Labour	Clive Lewis	31,311	61.0	+21.7
Conservative	Lana Hempsall	15,715	30.6	+7.1
Liberal Democrats	James Wright	2,841	5.5	−8.1
Green	Richard Bearman	1,492	2.9	−11.0
Majority		15,596	30.4	+14.6
Turnout		51,359	69.2	+4.5
Labour hold		Swing	+7.3	

General election 2015: Norwich South
Party	Candidate	Votes	%	±%
Labour	Clive Lewis	19,033	39.3	+10.6
Conservative	Lisa Townsend	11,379	23.5	+0.6
Green	Lesley Grahame	6,749	13.9	−1.0
Liberal Democrats	Simon Wright	6,607	13.6	−15.8
UKIP	Steve Emmens	4,539	9.4	+7.0
Class War	David Peel	96	0.2	N/A
Independent	Cengiz Ceker	60	0.1	N/A
Majority		7,654	15.8	N/A
Turnout		48,463	64.7	+0.1
Labour gain from Liberal Democrats		Swing	+5.0	

General election 2010: Norwich South
Party	Candidate	Votes	%	±%
Liberal Democrats	Simon Wright	13,960	29.4	−0.6
Labour	Charles Clarke	13,650	28.7	−8.7
Conservative	Antony Little	10,902	22.9	+1.1
Green	Adrian Ramsay	7,095	14.9	+7.5
UKIP	Stephen Emmens	1,145	2.4	+0.9
BNP	Len Heather	697	1.5	N/A
Workers Revolutionary	Gabriel Polley	102	0.2	0.0
Majority		310	0.7	N/A
Turnout		47,551	64.6	N/A
Liberal Democrats win (new boundaries)				

*NB boundary changes occurred between 2005 and 2010.

=== Elections in the 2000s ===
General election 2005: Norwich South
Party	Candidate	Votes	%	±%
Labour	Charles Clarke	15,904	37.7	−7.8
Liberal Democrats	Andrew Aalders-Dunthorne	12,251	29.0	+6.4
Conservative	Antony Little	9,567	22.7	−2.1
Green	Adrian Ramsay	3,101	7.4	+4.0
UKIP	Vandra Ahlstrom	597	1.4	+0.3
English Democrat	Christine Constable	466	1.1	N/A
Legalise Cannabis	Don Barnard	219	0.5	−1.0
Workers Revolutionary	Roger Blackwell	85	0.2	N/A
Majority		3,653	8.7	−12.0
Turnout		42,190	65.0	+5.2
Labour hold		Swing	−7.1	

General election 2001: Norwich South
Party	Candidate	Votes	%	±%
Labour	Charles Clarke	19,367	45.5	−6.2
Conservative	Andrew French	10,551	24.8	+1.1
Liberal Democrats	Andrew Aalders-Dunthorne	9,640	22.6	+4.0
Green	Adrian Holmes	1,434	3.4	+2.0
Legalise Cannabis	Alun Buffrey	620	1.5	0.0
Socialist Alliance	Edward Manningham	507	1.2	N/A
UKIP	Tarquin Mills	473	1.1	N/A
Majority		8,816	20.7	−7.3
Turnout		42,592	59.8	−12.8
Labour hold		Swing	-3.6	

=== Elections in the 1990s ===
General election 1997: Norwich South
Party	Candidate	Votes	%	±%
Labour	Charles Clarke	26,267	51.7	+3.0
Conservative	Bashir Khanbhai	12,028	23.7	−12.9
Liberal Democrats	Andrew Aalders-Dunthorne	9,457	18.6	+5.7
Referendum	David Holdsworth	1,464	2.9	N/A
Legalise Cannabis	Howard Marks	765	1.5	N/A
Green	Adrian Holmes	736	1.4	−0.2
Natural Law	Bryan Parsons	84	0.2	0.0
Majority		14,239	28.0	+15.9
Turnout		50,801	72.6	−8.0
Labour hold		Swing	+8.0	

General election 1992: Norwich South
Party	Candidate	Votes	%	±%
Labour	John Garrett	24,965	48.7	+10.8
Conservative	David Baxter	18,784	36.6	−0.7
Liberal Democrats	Christopher Thomas	6,609	12.9	−12.0
Green	Adrian Holmes	803	1.6	N/A
Natural Law	Bryan Parsons	104	0.2	N/A
Majority		6,181	12.1	+11.5
Turnout		51,265	80.6	0.0
Labour hold		Swing	+5.7	

=== Elections in the 1980s ===
General election 1987: Norwich South
Party	Candidate	Votes	%	±%
Labour	John Garrett	19,666	37.9	+2.6
Conservative	John Powley	19,330	37.3	−1.5
SDP	Charles Hardie	12,896	24.9	+0.4
Majority		336	0.6	N/A
Turnout		51,892	80.6	+4.2
Labour gain from Conservative		Swing	+2.1	

General election 1983: Norwich South
Party	Candidate	Votes	%
Conservative	John Powley	18,998	38.8
Labour	John Garrett	17,286	35.3
SDP	Charles Hardie	11,968	24.5
Ecology	Anthony D. Carter	468	1.0
National Front	Peter C. Williams	145	0.3
Independent	Jon C. Ward	91	0.2
Majority		1,712	3.5
Turnout		48,956	76.4
Conservative gain from Labour			

- This constituency underwent boundary changes between the 1979 and 1983 general elections and thus calculation of change in vote share is not meaningful.

=== Elections in the 1970s ===
General election 1979: Norwich South
Party	Candidate	Votes	%	±%
Labour	John Garrett	16,240	44.9	−2.2
Conservative	I. Coutts	15,042	41.6	+4.1
Liberal	P. Mackintosh	4,618	12.8	−2.6
National Front	Andrew Fountaine	264	0.7	N/A
Majority		1,198	3.3	−6.3
Turnout		36,164	80.2	+1.7
Labour hold		Swing	−3.2	

General election October 1974: Norwich South
Party	Candidate	Votes	%	±%
Labour	John Garrett	16,590	47.1	+5.8
Conservative	Maureen Tomison	13,185	37.5	−2.0
Liberal	P.G. Smith	5,429	15.4	−3.9
Majority		3,405	9.6	+7.8
Turnout		35,204	78.5	−5.5
Labour hold		Swing	+3.9	

General election February 1974: Norwich South
Party	Candidate	Votes	%	±%
Labour	John Garrett	15,393	41.3	−3.4
Conservative	Thomas Stuttaford	14,741	39.5	−7.5
Liberal	L. Parker	7,183	19.3	+11.0
Majority		652	1.8	N/A
Turnout		37,317	84.0	+5.8
Labour gain from Conservative		Swing	+2.1	

General election 1970: Norwich South
Party	Candidate	Votes	%	±%
Conservative	Thomas Stuttaford	17,067	47.0	+1.8
Labour	Conrad Ascher	16,241	44.7	−10.1
Liberal	Lesley Parker	3,031	8.3	N/A
Majority		826	2.3	N/A
Turnout		36,339	78.2	−5.0
Conservative gain from Labour		Swing	+6.0	

=== Elections in the 1960s ===
General election 1966: Norwich South
Party	Candidate	Votes	%	±%
Labour	Christopher Norwood	19,163	54.8	+3.9
Conservative	Anthony Gurney	15,808	45.2	−3.9
Majority		3,355	9.6	+7.8
Turnout		34,971	83.2	+0.5
Labour hold		Swing	+3.9	

General election 1964: Norwich South
Party	Candidate	Votes	%	±%
Labour	Christopher Norwood	17,973	50.9	+4.0
Conservative	Geoffrey Rippon	17,362	49.1	−4.0
Majority		611	1.8	N/A
Turnout		35,335	82.7	+0.5
Labour gain from Conservative		Swing	+4.0	

=== Elections in the 1950s ===
General election 1959: Norwich South
Party	Candidate	Votes	%	±%
Conservative	Geoffrey Rippon	19,128	53.1	+0.6
Labour	George Wallace	16,884	46.9	−0.6
Majority		2,244	6.2	+1.2
Turnout		36,012	82.2	+3.9
Conservative hold		Swing	+0.6	

General election 1955: Norwich South
Party	Candidate	Votes	%	±%
Conservative	Geoffrey Rippon	18,659	52.5	0.0
Labour	Mabel Tylecote	16,901	47.5	0.0
Majority		1,758	5.0	0.0
Turnout		35,560	78.3	−6.0
Conservative hold		Swing	0.0	

General election 1951: Norwich South
Party	Candidate	Votes	%	±%
Conservative	Henry Strauss	19,082	52.5	−0.8
Labour	Mabel Tylecote	17,234	47.5	+0.8
Majority		1,848	5.0	−1.6
Turnout		36,316	84.3	−0.7
Conservative hold		Swing	−0.8	

General election 1950: Norwich South
Party	Candidate	Votes	%	±%
Conservative	Henry Strauss	18,693	53.3	
Labour	Mabel Tylecote	16,368	46.7	
Majority		2,325	6.6	
Turnout		35,061	85.0	
Conservative win (new seat)				

== See also ==
- List of parliamentary constituencies in Norfolk
- List of parliamentary constituencies in the East of England (region)
