= Pamela Ropner =

British author

Pamela Christine Ropner
- Born: 20 April 1931
- Died: 4 July 2013 (aged 82)
- Education: University of Edinburgh
- Occupation: Author
- Spouse: Thomas Stuttaford (m. 1957)
- Children: 3

Pamela Christine Ropner (20 April 1931 – 4 July 2013) was a British author. She was the daughter of Richard Ropner and Margaret Forbes Ronald, and graduated in 1951 from the University of Edinburgh, with an M.A. She married the doctor and medical writer Tom Stuttaford in 1957, with whom she had three sons, including Andrew (born 1958).

She died on 4 July 2013 at the age of 82, after a long illness.

== Books ==
- The Golden Impala, (1957)
- The House of the Bittern, (1965)
- The Guardian Angel, (1966)
- The Sea Friends, (1968)
- Helping Mr Paterson, (1982)

== Awards ==
- 1959 Boys Club of America Junior Award for The Golden Impala
