= Thomas Stuttaford =

British medical doctor, columnist and politician

Dr Thomas Stuttaford OBE
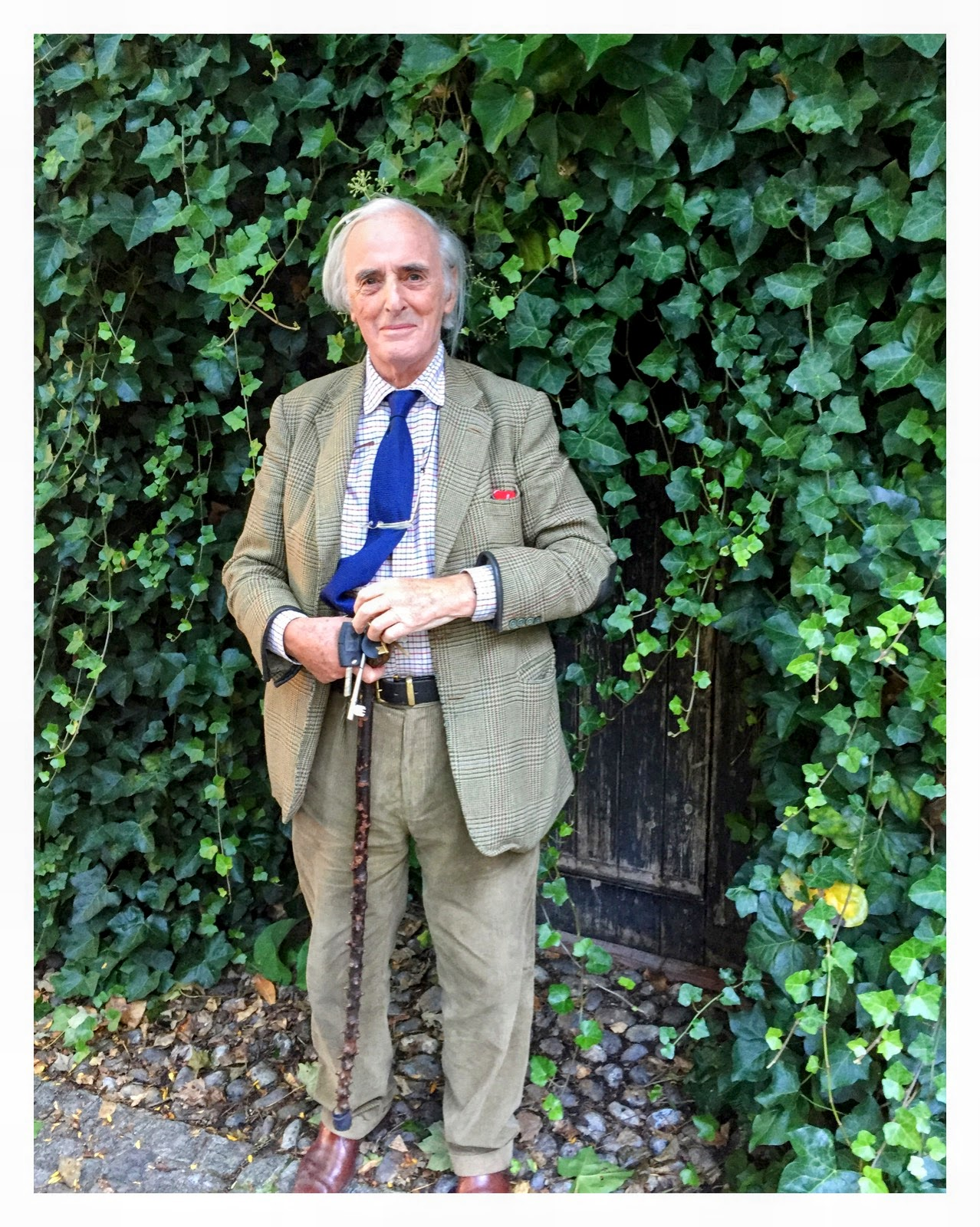

Member of Parliament for Norwich South
- In office 18 June 1970 – 8 February 1974
- Preceded by: Christopher Norwood
- Succeeded by: John Garrett

Personal details
- Born: 4 May 1931 Horning, Norfolk, England
- Died: 8 June 2018 (aged 87)
- Party: Conservative
- Spouse: Pamela Ropner (m. 1957; died 2013)
- Children: Andrew, Thomas, and Hugo
- Education: Gresham's School
- Alma mater: Brasenose College, Oxford

Irving Thomas Stuttaford (4 May 1931 – 8 June 2018) was a British medical doctor, columnist, and politician who served as the Conservative Member of Parliament for Norwich South between 1970 and 1974. In 2002, he retired as Senior Medical Advisor for Barclays Bank.

== Early life ==
The third child of Dr William Stuttaford, MC and his wife, Marjorie (née Royden), Stuttaford was born in Horning, Norfolk. He was educated at Gresham's School and Brasenose College, Oxford.

== Career ==
=== Medicine ===
Stuttaford qualified as a doctor in 1959, working at the Hammersmith Hospital before joining his uncle's general practice in rural east Norfolk. Later, he helped set up a general practice in Norwich, where he remained until being elected an MP in 1970. He continued practising medicine as a consultant for Bupa for most of his time in parliament.

After losing his seat, Stuttaford remained with Bupa for several more years, but took on other medical jobs, including acting as medical adviser to a number of companies, and specialising in genitourinary medicine at the Royal London and Queen Mary's Hospitals, as well as Moorfields Eye Hospital. He was also a partner in a small private practice.

=== Politics ===
From 1970 to 1974, Stuttaford was the Conservative MP for Norwich South. He was a frequent dissenter from the Conservative government's line in parliament, including over the introduction of value added tax (VAT) on children's shoes, the ending of free school milk for older primary school children, and the introduction of museum charges. He also took a leading role within parliament in the campaign, led by The Sunday Times, to secure compensation for children born with birth defects arising out of their mothers' use of the drug thalidomide during pregnancy. Stuttaford lost his Norwich South seat to John Garrett in the first general election of 1974.

In two subsequent elections, he was selected as the Conservative candidate in the Isle of Ely to oppose Clement Freud, who had won the seat for the Liberal Party in a by-election in 1973 after the death of Sir Harry Legge-Bourke. Freud later increased his majority in the first 1974 election. Stuttaford was first selected to oppose Freud for 1974's second general election. In their first contest, Freud's majority was sharply reduced. Stuttaford was then selected to challenge Freud again.

In the 1979 general election Stuttaford received the highest number of Conservative votes ever recorded in the constituency, but the collapse of the Labour vote (many former Labour voters switched their support to the Liberals) ensured that Freud was again returned, this time with a slightly increased majority.

=== Medical journalism ===
In 1981, Stuttaford was recruited by the then editor of The Times, Harold Evans, to be the paper's medical correspondent, a role he retained until January 2009. Stuttaford had worked with Evans during the latter's campaign to secure compensation for the victims of thalidomide.

In later years, he continued to write the regular monthly column for The Oldie that he had begun in 1994. He filed his last piece for the magazine just a few days before his death. He was a frequent contributor to Healthspan, an online retailer of vitamin supplements, and occasionally to other national newspapers and journals. He was accused by Dr Ben Goldacre in The Guardian of using an article in The Times to promote energy replacement pills that appear to have nothing more than a placebo effect. He was parodied in the satirical magazine Private Eye as "Dr Thomas Utterfraud".

== Personal life ==
Stuttaford married Pamela Ropner on 1 June 1957; they remained married until her death on 4 July 2013. The couple had three sons: Andrew, Thomas and Hugo; the eldest, Andrew, is an editor of National Review. Stuttaford died on 8 June 2018.

== Books ==
- To Your Good Health!: The Wise Drinker's Guide, Faber and Faber Ltd, 1997, ISBN 0-571-19095-2
- The Harvard Medical School Family Health Guide: UK Edition (Editor), Cassell reference, 2003, ISBN 0-304-35719-7
- What's up Doc? Understanding your Common Symptoms: Health Matters, Little Books, 2003, ISBN 1-904435-02-5
- Stress and How to Avoid It, Little Books, 2004, ISBN 1-904435-09-2

Parliament of the United Kingdom
Preceded by Christopher Norwood	Member of Parliament for Norwich South; 1970–February 1974	Succeeded by John Garrett
