= South Norfolk by-election =

South Norfolk by-election may refer to one of three by-elections held for the British House of Commons constituency of South Norfolk:

- 1898 South Norfolk by-election
- 1920 South Norfolk by-election
- 1955 South Norfolk by-election

== See also ==
- List of United Kingdom by-elections
- South Norfolk constituency
