= Thomas William Hay =

Lieutenant-Colonel Thomas William Hay (25 August 1882 – 10 July 1956) was a British military officer and politician, who served as the Conservative Member of Parliament for South Norfolk in 1922–1923.

Hay was the son of Admiral Lord John Hay, and was educated at Clifton College. During the First World War he served with the Leicestershire Yeomanry and the 16th Lancers, and was mentioned in despatches.

In the 1922 United Kingdom general election, he was the Conservative candidate for South Norfolk; the Liberal Party did not stand a candidate, leaving a direct contest between Hay and the incumbent Labour member, George Edwards, who had won the seat in a 1920 by-election. Hay won by a small majority. However, at the subsequent 1923 general election he was defeated by Edwards. Hay thus sat for slightly under a year, one of the shortest-serving MPs in history. He did not contest the 1924 general election, which saw the seat return to Conservative control.

During the Second World War, Hay served with the Royal Air Force Volunteer Reserve, rising to the rank of squadron leader.

Parliament of the United Kingdom
| Preceded by George Edwards | Member of Parliament for South Norfolk; 1922–1923 | Succeeded by George Edwards |
