= Francis Taylor (Liberal Unionist politician) =

Taylor in 1895

Francis Taylor (1845 – 1 September 1915) was an English brewer and Liberal and Liberal Unionist politician.

Taylor was the third son of Thomas Lombe Taylor of Diss, Norfolk. He was educated at University College School and University College, London. The Taylor family had property in Diss and had an interest in "Taylor and Dowson's" one of the brewers in the town. Taylor became a partner in the brewery and inherited the interests of his father in the town, living at the Manor House in Mount Street. He married Susan, daughter of Edward Rigby M.D.

In 1885 Taylor was elected as Member of Parliament for South Norfolk as a Liberal, and in 1886 became a Liberal Unionist. He held the seat until 1898 when he retired through ill-health. He died in Diss on 1 September 1915.

Parliament of the United Kingdom
Preceded by Robert Gurdon and Sir Robert Buxton	Member of Parliament for South Norfolk; 1885 – 1898	Succeeded by Arthur Soames
