= 1955 South Norfolk by-election =

UK parliamentary by-election

The 1955 South Norfolk by-election was a by-election held on 13 January 1955, for the British House of Commons constituency of South Norfolk.

The by-election was triggered by the expulsion of the serving Conservative Member of Parliament (MP), Peter Baker, who had been expelled from the House of Commons after being convicted of uttering, forgery and fraud and sentenced to seven years' imprisonment.

In the early 1920s, South Norfolk had been a marginal seat which alternated between Conservative and Labour MPs, before the Conservative James Christie held it from the 1924 election until Labour's Christopher Mayhew won the seat at the 1945 general election. Baker had recaptured South Norfolk for the Conservatives in 1950 and held it in 1951; but with majorities of 6.8% and 9.0%, it was far from being a safe seat for the Conservative Party.

The result was a narrow win for the Conservative candidate John Hill, with a majority of only 865 votes (2.9%) over his sole opponent, the Labour candidate J. M. Stewart. At the general election in May 1955, Hill again faced Stewart, and on a much higher turnout held the seat with a majority of 1,475 (4.1%). He remained South Norfolk's MP until his retirement from Parliament at the February 1974 general election.

== Result ==
South Norfolk by-election, 1955
Party	Candidate	Votes	%	±%
Conservative	John Hill	15,119	51.5	−3.0
Labour	J.M. Stewart	14,254	48.5	+3.0
Majority		865	3.0	−6.0
Turnout		29,373		
Conservative hold		Swing	−3.0	

== See also ==
- 1898 South Norfolk by-election
- 1920 South Norfolk by-election
- List of United Kingdom by-elections
- South Norfolk constituency
