= Richard Bacon (politician) =

British politician (born 1962)

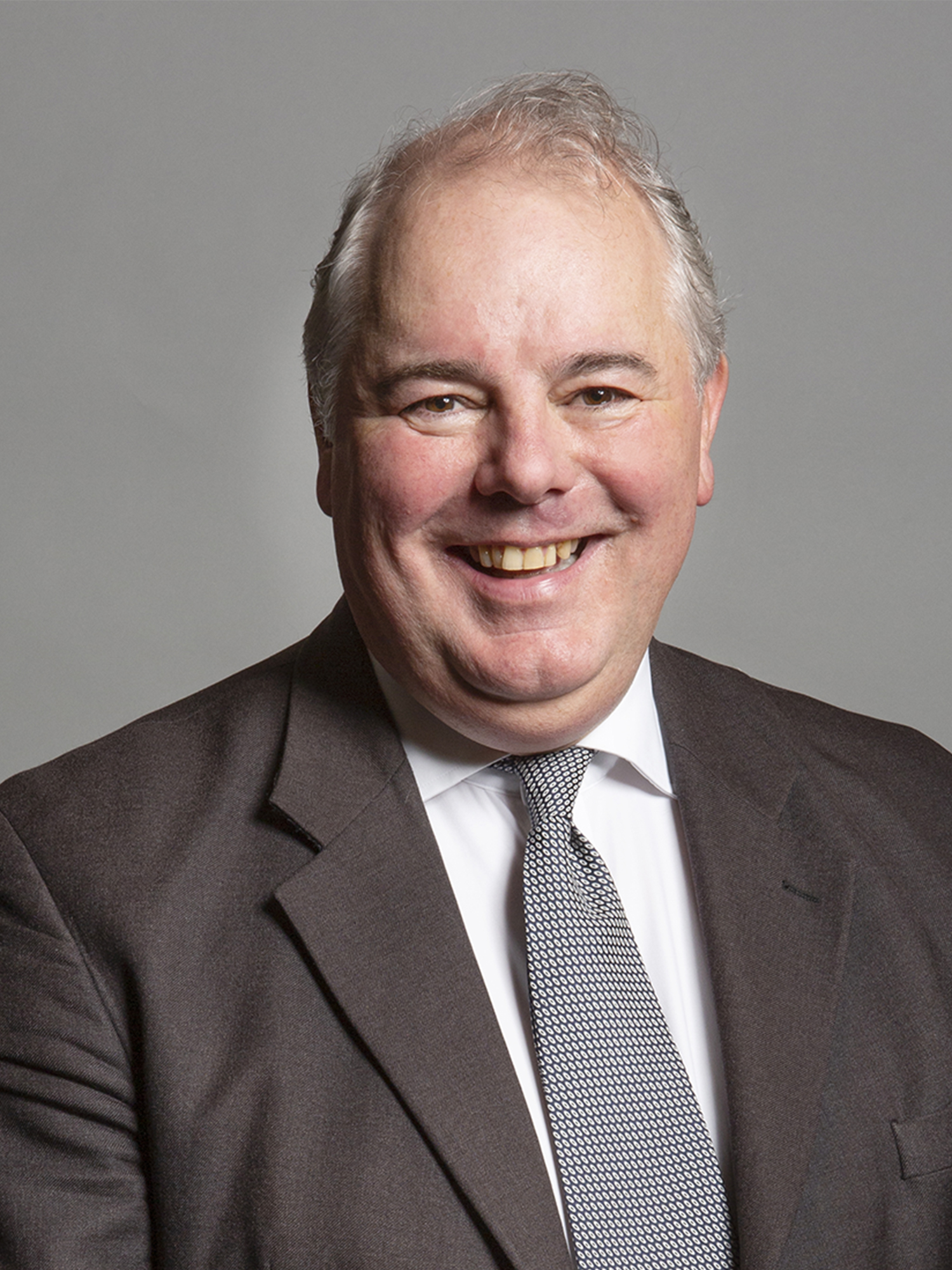
- Official portrait, 2020

Member of Parliament for South Norfolk
- In office 7 June 2001 – 30 May 2024
- Preceded by: John MacGregor
- Succeeded by: Ben Goldsborough

Personal details
- Born: 3 December 1962 (age 63) Solihull, Warwickshire, England
- Party: Conservative
- Education: London School of Economics
- Website: richardbacon.org.uk

Richard Michael Bacon (born 3 December 1962) is a British politician who served as the Member of Parliament (MP) for South Norfolk from 2001 until 2024. He is a member of the Conservative Party.

== Early life ==
Bacon was educated at The King's School, Worcester and then studied at the London School of Economics and Political Science, gaining a first in Politics and Economics. He was also executive editor of the student newspaper, The Beaver.

He worked variously in investment banking, financial journalism and public relations consultancy, before setting up his own business advising blue chip international companies on communications.

== Parliamentary career ==
Bacon joined the Conservative Party in 1978. In 1997, he unsuccessfully contested the South-London constituency of Vauxhall, against the Labour incumbent, Kate Hoey. He finished in third place with 15.2% of the overall vote.

Bacon was then selected for the very safe Conservative seat of South Norfolk on the retirement of its veteran MP and former Cabinet Minister, John MacGregor. He won the seat at the 2001 general election, and was returned again at the 2005 general election with an increased majority. In the 2011 district council elections his constituency lost a single Conservative seat to the Liberal Democrats resulting in a majority of 30 seats. In the 2015 general election, Bacon increased his majority for a third time, to double that of his 2001 winning margin.

Bacon is a former member of the Public Accounts Committee as of 2017.

Though he rarely rebelled against the party line, he consistently rebelled in votes on military action in the Middle East. In March 2003 he was one of only 15 Conservative MPs to vote against the 2003 invasion of Iraq. He stated at the time that "I do not believe war is always wrong. If I had, I would not have served in the Territorial Army".

Following the Commons debate on Britain's response to the Syrian civil war on 29 August 2013, Bacon voted against his own party on a motion approving the use of military force "if necessary" (one of 30 Conservatives to do so), saying he was "voting against the principle of military action".

In the Commons debate on intervention against ISIS in Iraq held on 26 September 2014, Bacon again voted against his own party, becoming one of only six Conservatives to defy the three-line whip imposed on Conservative MPs. Prior to the vote he said: "After bombing the Middle East for much of the past twenty five years, we should have realised by now that we are making things worse".

In May 2009, Bacon was one of 15 MPs to sign a Motion of No Confidence in the House of Commons speaker Michael Martin.

He voted against anti-terror laws, top-up fees, foundation hospitals, and the ban on fox hunting, and was one of the few Conservatives to support the Impeach Blair campaign. He was also sceptical about aspects of the climate change debate, having opposed plans to build new wind turbines in South Norfolk, stating the scheme was not viable for the area.

In February 2007, Bacon was alleged to be the politician with the highest expenditure on taxi and car hire during the previous year, a claim which he disputed and referred to the National Audit Office.

Bacon was in favour of Brexit prior to the 2016 referendum.

In May 2023, Bacon announced he would stand down at the 2024 general election.

=== Deporting foreign prisoners ===
In April 2006, Bacon's questioning of Home Office officials concerning the fate of failed asylum seekers released from prison led to a major embarrassment for the Labour administration in the run-up to the local elections the following month, and the dismissal of Charles Clarke, the home secretary. Bacon was not actually himself in favour of the sacking of Clarke, a fellow Norfolk MP, declaring that he had always liked him, and that his questioning had been "business, not pleasure".

In July 2006, Bacon was named "Backbencher of the Year" by his fellow MPs for the result of his efforts, and in November 2006, he won three more awards: "Parliamentarian of the Year" from The Spectator magazine, "Politician of the Year" from the Political Studies Association and "Outstanding Parliamentarian of the Year" from the ConservativeHome website.

=== Constituency dissatisfaction ===
Bacon was deselected by his local party committee after coming under fire from constituents who complained that he was guilty of repeatedly failing to respond to emails and other forms of correspondence. They also complained that he was virtually anonymous in his South Norfolk constituency. This eventually led to posters being put up throughout South Norfolk asking 'Where is Richard? Has anyone seen our MP?' The view being that Mr Bacon was not doing his job of representing his constituents.

=== Conundrum ===
Bacon is co-author, along with Christopher Hope, senior political correspondent of The Daily Telegraph, of Conundrum: Why every government gets things wrong and what we can do about it (2013), an analysis of the failure of high-profile UK public sector projects, including the National Health Service IT programme and the Child Support Agency, Passport Agency, Tax Credit scheme, Rural Payments Agency and Student Loans Company. They argue that a key reason for the repeated failure of such projects is that civil servants – charged with turning the grand vision of ministers into reality – "have been recruited on the basis of their cognitive abilities in terms of playing with ideas, not for their ability to make things happen".

== Personal life ==
Bacon was married to Victoria Panton in 2006 at St Margaret's Church, Westminster, and has two children. The couple divorced in 2019.

Parliament of the United Kingdom
Preceded by John MacGregor	Member of Parliament for South Norfolk; 2001–2024	Succeeded by Ben Goldsborough
