= Leslie Baker (film executive) =

British film executive

Leslie Forsyth Baker, ACA, (30 April 1903 – 2 December 1981), was a British film executive based at Ealing Studios; he worked with his brother, Reginald Baker.

== Biography ==
Baker entered the film industry in 1924 with Gainsborough Pictures; between 1930 and 1933, a senior partner in the accountancy firm of Baker, Todman and Co. He went on to become assistant general manager, production for Gainsborough and Gaumont British pictures corp, (1933–35). He was appointed director, secretary and general production manager and associate producer for Twentieth Century Productions Ltd, (1938–43). He joined Ealing studios as secretary in 1943 and was elected to the board in 1946.

Baker married, in 1932, Doris Kathleen Godwin born in Bristol to Leonard George Godwin, a Bread maker based in Essex.

Baker died at the age of 78.

== Family ==
Baker was the father of Anglican priest John Baker (1936-1988), vicar of Newick, Sussex who became acquainted sometime in 1983 with British con man Derry Mainwaring Knight (1939-2016). Knight who claimed to have been initiated into a cult called the Sons of Lucifer, persuaded Baker to help him financially in his crusade against satanism. In 1986, Knight appeared at the Crown Court in Maidstone, Kent and was convicted of 19 charges of fraud and sentenced to 7 years imprisonment.

== Filmography ==
- Dinner at the Ritz (1937)
- Under the Red Robe (1937)
- Inspector Hornleigh (1939)
- Smiling Along (1938)

== Sources ==
- The American Film Institute Catalog of Motion Pictures Produced in the United States (1931–40), by Patricia King Hanson and Alan Gevinson, published by University of California Press (1993).
- Films Famous, Fanciful, Frolicsome & Fantastic, by John Howard Reid, published by Lulu.com
