= Ben Goldsborough =

British Labour politician

Ben Goldsborough MP
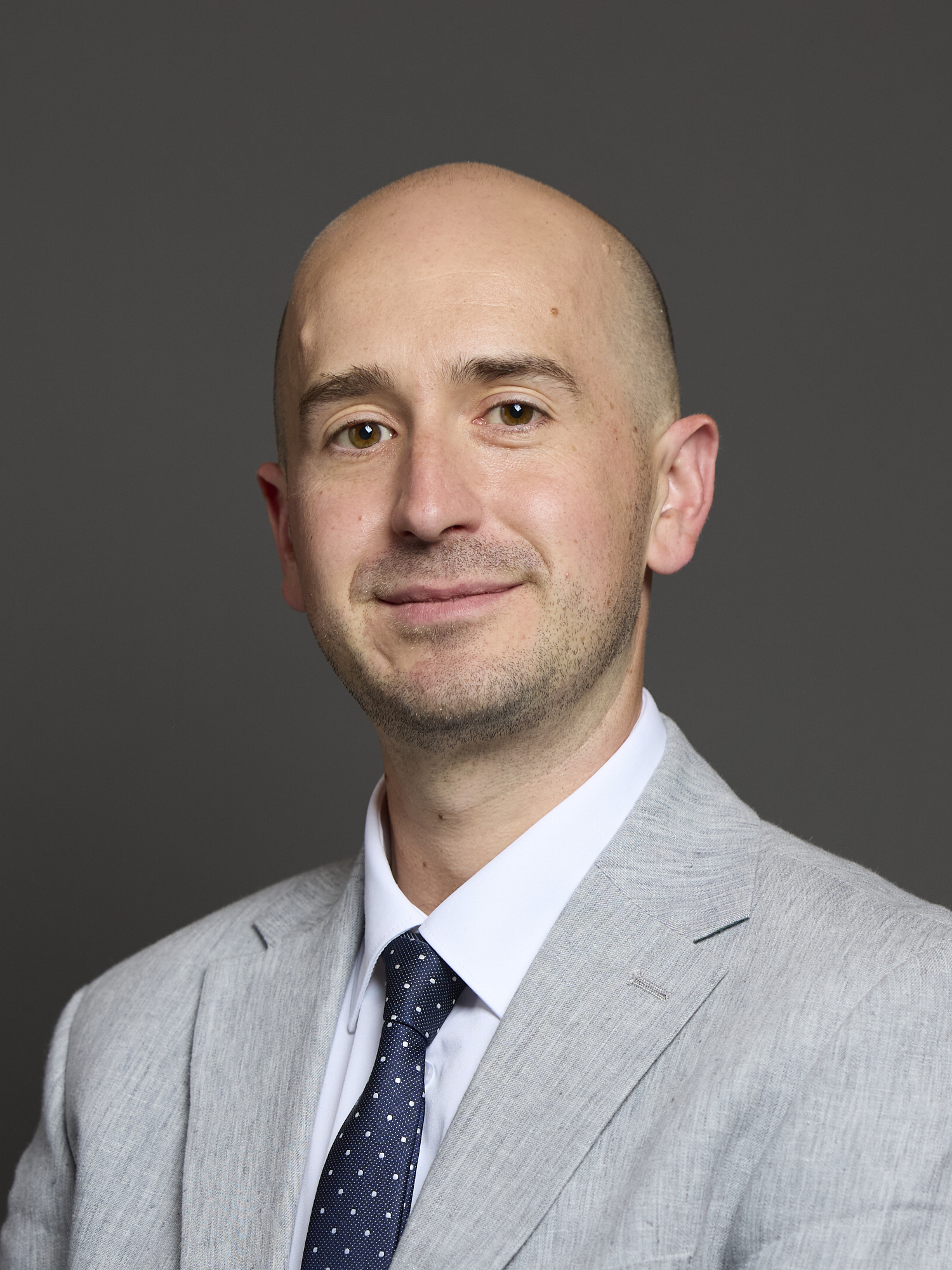
- Official portrait, 2024

Member of Parliament for South Norfolk
- Incumbent
- Assumed office 4 July 2024
- Preceded by: Richard Bacon
- Majority: 2,826 (5.7%)

Mayor of Flint
- In office 19 May 2023 – 17 May 2024
- Deputy: Mel Buckley
- Preceded by: Michelle Perfect
- Succeeded by: Mel Buckley

Deputy Mayor of Flint
- In office 20 May 2022 – 19 May 2023
- Mayor: Michelle Perfect
- Preceded by: Mel Buckley
- Succeeded by: Mel Buckley

Flint Town Councillor for Coleshill
- In office 6 May 2022 – 4 July 2024
- Succeeded by: Margaret Hanson

Personal details
- Born: September 1990 (age 35–36) Suffolk, England
- Party: Labour
- Other political affiliations: Welsh Labour
- Education: Newmarket Upper School, University of Hull (BA)
- Website: bengoldsborough.co.uk

Ben Goldsborough (born August 1990) is a British Labour Party politician who has served as the Member of Parliament (MP) for South Norfolk since the 2024 general election. Prior to his election as an MP, Goldsborough had served as a councillor on the Flint Town Council in Flintshire, Wales.

== Early life and education ==
Goldsborough was born in September 1990 in Suffolk. He attended Newmarket Upper School from 2003 to 2008 before graduating with a BA in British Politics and Legislative Studies from the University of Hull in 2015. Goldsborough grew up in Norfolk but later moved to Wales for work.

== Political career ==
From 2015 to 2019, Goldsborough served as a parliamentary assistant for David Hanson, then-MP for Delyn. He was elected unopposed as a Labour councillor for Coleshill ward on the Flint Town Council in May 2022. The same month, he ran for the Northop seat on Flintshire County Council and finished third out of six candidates in the election. On 20 May 2022, Goldsborough was appointed Deputy Mayor of Flint on a one-year term. In May 2023, he was appointed Mayor of Flint on a one-year term.

Goldsborough initially sought the Labour parliamentary candidate nomination for Clwyd East in April 2023, but lost to eventual MP Becky Gittins. In May 2024, he was selected to stand as the Labour candidate for South Norfolk in the 2024 general election. He won the constituency from the Conservative Party by a margin of 2,826 votes and became South Norfolk's first Labour MP since Christopher Mayhew, who held the seat from 1945 to 1950.

In October 2024, Goldsborough was appointed to the Petitions Committee of the House of Commons. Since then he was elected unopposed to the Environment, Food and Rural Affairs Select Committee in June 2026.

== Personal life ==
In February 2025, he revealed that he had been diagnosed with stage II melanoma.

== Electoral performance ==
=== House of Commons ===
General election 2024: South Norfolk
Party	Candidate	Votes	%	±%
Labour	Ben Goldsborough	17,353	35.0	+11.6
Conservative	Poppy Simister-Thomas	14,527	29.3	−27.2
Reform	Chris Harrison	7,583	15.3	New
Liberal Democrats	Christopher Brown	5,746	11.6	–5.4
Green	Catherine Rowett	3,987	8.0	+4.8
Independent	Paco Davila	254	0.5	New
SDP	Jason Maguire	129	0.3	New
Majority		2,826	5.7	
Turnout		49,579	66.9	–7.4
Labour gain from Conservative		Swing	+19.4	

=== Flintshire County Council ===
2022 Flintshire County Council election: Northop (2 seats)
Party	Candidate	Votes	%	±%
Independent	Marion Bateman	779	38.5	
Independent	Linda Thew	736	36.4	
Labour	Ben Goldsborough	617	30.5	
Independent	Paul Ashley	417	20.6	
Independent	Tony Sharps	395	19.5	
Liberal Democrats	Uzma Sikander	330	16.3	
Turnout		2,021		
Independent win (new seat)				
Independent win (new seat)				

=== Flint Town Council ===
2022 Flint Town Council election: Coleshill (5 seats)
Party	Candidate	Votes	%	±%
Labour	Norma Davies	Unopposed		
Labour	Russell Davies	Unopposed		
Labour	Ben Goldsborough	Unopposed		
Independent	Carol Griffiths	Unopposed		
Labour	Michelle Perfect	Unopposed		
Labour hold				
Labour hold				
Labour hold				
Independent win (new seat)				
Labour hold				

Parliament of the United Kingdom
Preceded by Richard Bacon	Member of Parliament for South Norfolk; 2024–present	Incumbent
