= John Hill (British politician) =

Barrister, farmer, and British Conservative Party politician (1912–2007)

Opposition Deputy Chief Whip of the House of Commons
- In office 16 October 1964 – 29 October 1964
- Leader: Alec Douglas-Home
- Preceded by: Edward Short
- Succeeded by: William Whitelaw

Member of Parliament for South Norfolk
- In office 13 January 1955 – 8 February 1974
- Preceded by: Peter Baker
- Succeeded by: John MacGregor

Personal details
- Born: John Edward Bernard Hill; 13 November 1912
- Died: 6 December 2007 (aged 95)
- Party: Conservative
- Spouse: Edith Luard (m. 1944; died 1995)
- Children: 1 (adopted)
- Education: Charterhouse School
- Alma mater: Merton College, Oxford
- Profession: Farming

Military service
- Allegiance: United Kingdom
- Branch/service: British Army
- Rank: Captain

John Edward Bernard Hill (13 November 1912 – 6 December 2007) was a British barrister, farmer and Conservative politician who served as Member of Parliament (MP) for South Norfolk for 19 years, from 1955 to 1974. He was also one of the UK's first MEPs, serving from 1973 to 1974.

== Early life ==
Hill was the only son of Captain Robert Hill, an officer in the Cambridgeshire Regiment. He was educated at Charterhouse School and Merton College, Oxford, where he gained a football Blue in 1934. After two years travelling in Asia and the Middle East, he became a barrister, called to the Bar at Inner Temple in 1938. He was commissioned into 64th Field Regiment, Royal Artillery in 1939, shortly before the outbreak of the Second World War, and was attached for some time to the skiing unit of the 5th Battalion, Scots Guards. From 1942 he served as an air observation pilot, flying spotter planes in Tunisia with No. 651 Squadron RAF. He was severely wounded, and invalided out of the Army in 1945 with the rank of Captain.

After the war, he took up farming, buying a 700-acre (2.8 km^{2}) farm near Halesworth in Suffolk. He was a councillor on Wainford Rural District Council in Suffolk from 1946 to 1953, and a senior member of various East Anglian river and flood defence boards. He served as a governor of Charterhouse School from 1958 to 1990, and on the council of the University of East Anglia from 1975 to 1982.

== Political career ==
Hill was elected to the House of Commons on 13 January 1955, in a by-election caused by the expulsion of the sitting Conservative MP, Captain Peter Baker, after Baker's conviction for uttering, forgery and fraud and subsequent imprisonment for seven years. Hill scraped home with a majority reduced to only 865. He held then seat later that year at the 1955 general election, and was re-elected in four subsequent general elections (in 1959, 1964, 1966 and 1970). His majority fell to only 119 in 1966. He did not stand in the February 1974 general election and was succeeded as MP by John MacGregor.

In Parliament, Hill concentrated mainly on the agricultural interests of his largely rural constituency. Elected to the executive of the 1922 Committee in November 1956, in the aftermath of the Suez Crisis, he became an assistant government whip in January 1959 alongside Willie Whitelaw. While an MP, he pressed for the introduction of a small clock in the corner of the internal monitors, which would tell everyone within the Palace of Westminster how long a member has been speaking for.

Hill served as a Lord Commissioner of the Treasury from 1960 to 1964 and as Opposition spokesman on education and science briefly in 1965–66. He was later active on the education and agriculture select committees. He supported Edward Heath's policy of joining the European Community, and was a delegate to the Council of Europe and the Western European Union. When the UK joined the EC in 1973, Hill was appointed as a Member of the European Parliament (MEP), and served from January 1973 until July 1974. At that time MEPs were appointed by national parliaments, rather than being directly elected.

== Personal life ==
In later life Hill concentrated on farming. He collected British art, particularly paintings by Samuel Palmer. He married Edith Luard (née Maxwell) in 1944; she died in 1995. Hill was survived by their adopted daughter.

Parliament of the United Kingdom
Preceded by Peter Baker	Member of Parliament for South Norfolk; 1955 – February 1974	Succeeded by John MacGregor
Party political offices
Preceded by Michael Hughes-Young	Conservative Deputy Chief Whip in the House of Commons; 1964	Succeeded by William Whitelaw
