= Peter Baker (British politician) =

British politician (1921–1966)

Peter Arthur David Baker MC MP
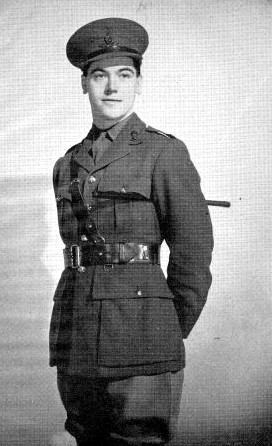
- Baker in 1939

Member of Parliament for South Norfolk
- In office 1950–1954
- Preceded by: Christopher Mayhew
- Succeeded by: John Hill

Personal details
- Born: 20 April 1921 Willesden, Middlesex
- Died: 14 November 1966 (aged 45) Eastbourne, East Sussex
- Party: Conservative
- Spouse: Gloria Mae Heaton-Armstrong
- Children: 2
- Education: Eastbourne College
- Occupation: Soldier, publisher, author, politician
- Awards: Military Cross

Military service
- Allegiance: United Kingdom
- Branch/service: British Army
- Years of service: 1939–1945
- Rank: Captain
- Unit: Special reconnaissance
- Battles/wars: Second World War: Operation Overlord; Operation Market Garden

Peter Arthur David Baker MC (20 April 1921 – 14 November 1966) was a British soldier, author, publisher and Conservative politician who served as a member of parliament (MP) for South Norfolk. He is chiefly remembered as the last Member of Parliament to be expelled from the House of Commons by resolution of the House, after his conviction for forgery, and as the inspiration behind the eccentric character of publisher Martin York in Muriel Spark's novel A Far Cry From Kensington. (Note: British poet and critic Derek Stanford's chronicles of the Neo-Romantic movement during the forties, entitled Inside the Forties, Literary Memoirs, 1937–1957, give some insight into Baker's character. Stanford is also one of the main protagonists in Spark's A Far Cry From Kensington, where he appeared as the unfortunate writer Harold Bartlett, nicknamed Le pisseur de copies ("he urinates frightful proses").)

Baker's arrest and trial received extensive international media coverage.

== Early life and family ==
Baker was born on 20 April 1921 in Willesden, north west London. He was the son of Major Reginald Poynton Baker of Loddenden Manor, Staplehurst, Kent, and his first wife Gwendolyn Emily Christabel Baker née Webb. Baker's father later became a successful movie producer based at Ealing Studios. Baker tried to create a fictional connection with the Tudor Bakers of Sissinghurst Castle, Kent, whose members included Sir John Baker, a Chancellor of the Exchequer and Speaker of the House of Commons in the 16th century; Sir Richard Baker, an author who was also a Member of Parliament; Sir Samuel White Baker, (Note: Falcon Press published in 1949 a work on Sir Samuel White Baker entitled Baker of the Nile, written by Dorothy Middleton (1909–1999). She was asked by Baker to write the book, (author's foreword, 20 July 1948, no mention of any genealogical link between Baker and his famous homonym). See My Testament, p. 247) the discoverer of Lake Albert; and his younger brother, Valentine Baker, a famous soldier who also spent some time in Wormwood Scrubs Prison.

Baker made another bogus claim, mentioning in his memoirs that St. Luke's Chapel, otherwise known as St Mary in the Marsh and situated inside Norwich Cathedral, had been the site since 1586 of his family weddings and christenings. In fact, it was only used on one occasion by his ancestors, in June 1744 for a quiet wedding. Nevertheless, this Lady chapel was chosen by Baker as the venue for his youngest daughter's christening.

On 5 June 1948, Baker married Gloria Mae Heaton-Armstrong, daughter of Colonel Charles George William Stacpool Heaton-Armstrong, in Kensington.

The Heaton-Armstrong family belonged to the Anglo-Irish Protestant landowning class and were related to soldier and MP Sir Thomas Armstrong. Armstrong was involved in the Rye House Plot.

== Education and military service ==
Baker was educated at Eastbourne College. He was preparing to study at the University of Cambridge until the imminent outbreak of World War II led him to enlist in the Royal Artillery. Although he could have taken an immediate commission, Baker and a friend who had joined up at the same time determined to serve at least six months in the ranks before accepting a posting to an Officer Cadet Training Unit in Catterick Garrison in March 1940. He was then posted to an artillery regiment based in Lockerbie, Dumfriesshire, and served for fourteen months across southern Scotland. He was commissioned as a 2nd Lieutenant on 7 September 1940. Considering the job of an artillery officer boring, Baker accepted in October 1941 a posting to be a Staff Captain in Military Intelligence based at the War Office. He hoped that the new appointment would make it more likely that he could obtain an overseas posting. After four months he applied for a transfer, although it took a further six months to persuade his superiors to let him leave.

=== Phantom ===
He was assigned to the GHQ Liaison Regiment (known as Phantom), (Note: The regimental badge was a white letter P on a black background. See SAS Heroes: Remarkable Soldiers, Extraordinary Men, by Peter Scholey (Osprey Publishing, 2009).) a mysterious unit established by Major-General George Frederick Hopkinson, commander of the 1st Airborne Division. Phantom was renowned for the unusual selection of brilliance, nobility and idiosyncrasy, wit, achievements and even criminality exhibited by its officers. Following training and exercises in Britain, Baker was assigned in June 1943 to the Phantom unit in North Africa at camp Bugeaud in Bône, Algeria. The unit consisted of three squadrons (E, K and H) and the Assault Detachment under the command of Major Mervyn Sydney Bobus Vernon (1912–1991) of the Grenadier Guards. Baker joined E squadron, which was headed by Major Hugh Fraser. E squadron was supposed to have followed the Assault Detachment (led by Christopher Mayhew) into Sicily, but the invasion turned out to be much easier than anticipated.

At the end of August, E squadron was ordered to Bizerta to be ready to take part in the invasion of Italy. The squadron's role was to carry out long-range reconnaissance, which it did initially from Taranto. Baker, with a small team, drove an unarmoured and lightly armed jeep up to a hundred miles from the forward base to discover the location of German troops. Late in 1943, the squadron withdrew to Trani, where Baker developed abdominal pains; he was flown back to Britain before Christmas, and was given four weeks' sick leave before being passed as fit for sedentary duty only.

=== MI9, taken prisoner ===
Baker, code named "Harrier", was recruited by MI9 to work with IS9 (WEA) (or Room 900), a unit formed by Airey Neave and Jimmy Langley dedicated to helping downed allied airmen and stranded soldiers escape German-occupied Europe. In 1944, Baker participated in Operation Marathon, led by Neave, that rescued a group of 152 Allied pilots who were hidden in the Fréteval Forest near Châteaudun. Upon their return, they discovered that 10 escapees were unaccounted for, and Baker returned to save the others. Baker accompanied Neave in following the Allied armies to Paris, Brussels, and the Netherlands.

In early October, Neave moved their unit to just west of Nijmegen, and obtained permission to send Baker through enemy lines to make contact with the Dutch Resistance. Baker was ordered to wear his British Army uniform and not leave his safe house during the day. On 11 October, Neave accompanied Baker to the River Waal, where he crossed in a canoe, and eventually made contact with the Resistance. The same canoe was used to bring out Dutch diplomat Herman van Roijen (later Dutch foreign minister) with critical intelligence information for his government in exile.

Baker stayed at a farmhouse where he was hosted by local resistance member Fekko Ebbens and his family. Baker was joined there a day or two later by Private First Class Theodore Bachenheimer (from the 504th Parachute Infantry of the US Army). Baker disobeyed orders by exchanging his military uniform for civilian clothes. Baker and PFC Bachenheimer walked around the area during the day and within sight of German troops.

On the night of 16–17 October, the house was raided by German forces who already had a quisling inside surveilling the goings on at the farm. Baker and Bachenheimer were arrested while sleeping and taken away as prisoners of war. Fekko Ebbens, the head of the Ebbens family, was executed some months later as reprisal for an attack on German troops by the Dutch resistance. Baker's superiors were furious that his disobedience threatened the rescue, Operation Pegasus, of hundreds of British paratroopers stranded in German-controlled territory.

=== Escape attempt ===
After interrogation in a primary school in Tiel, Baker and Bachenheimer were taken to a transit camp at Culemborg, and were then marched 45 km on foot to another transit camp near Amersfoort. From there, a five-day train journey took Baker to Stalag XI-B at Bad Fallingbostel where he was to stay until sent on to Oflag 79 in Braunschweig. During the journey, PFC Bachenheimer escaped, but was shot by German forces near the village of 't Harde on the night of 22–23 October. Baker was forced to abandon his own plans to escape from the train, but on arriving at Fallingbostel noticed that escape was possible there. He joined with a Belgian officer and a Malagasy French liaison officer named Jacques Hannebicque to make plans.

Baker claimed that his group of three passed themselves off as French prisoners and joined a work party which was sent out of the prison camp to collect firewood on the morning of 7 November. When the party got to the wood they broke away and started walking west. Baker claimed that "the most effective way to pass unsuspected was to salute everybody in uniform", whether military or civilian. The three had got 60 km away from their camp after two days, when they were detected by a German soldier, and failed in their bluff of being 'Men of confidence' (who were trusted to take charge of other prisoners of war). Baker decided to reveal his real identity long before he was given over to the Gestapo, to avoid mistreatment in their hands; however he believed they were only saved from being shot as spies when the farmer where they were discovered objected to the shooting happening on his land. He was sent to Stalag X-B at Sandbostel where he was interrogated with violence, and then spent 35 days in solitary confinement in multiple prisons before finally going to Oflag 79. His fellow escapee Hannebicque survived the war and later became a writer and photographer.

Arising out of his escape plans, Baker said he and his colleagues were court-martialed for forging leave passes. The Gestapo and the prosecution initially asked for the death penalty, but later altered it to six weeks in a punishment camp. They were actually sentenced to twenty-eight days' solitary confinement, of which twenty-five days were deducted because they had only previously had a sentence of ten days. During the spring of 1945, rations ran short in the camp as the Allied armies moved closer, and the camp was liberated on 12 April 1945 by the US Ninth Army. Baker gained permission to make his own way home and drove in a requisitioned Mercedes to Venlo, from where he flew to Ghent and then back to London. He weighed 7 stone 2 lbs when he returned to England.

On 2 August 1945, Captain Peter Baker (148257) of the Intelligence Corps, Staplehurst, Kent was awarded the Military Cross in recognition of gallant and distinguished services in North-West Europe.

== Post-war ==
As early as 1940 Baker had found himself in charge of editing a broadsheet of poems, including some he had written himself. The collection was known as the Resurgam Poets. Baker later adopted the pseudonym Colin Strang to edit two anthologies and write poetry reviews for newspapers and magazines, until he was posted to Africa. In early 1944, while he was in Britain, Baker's poem sequence "The Land of Prester John" was published, to what he thought was a poor critical reception.

After the war Baker, became a publisher with financial backing from his father; the company he founded, Falcon Press, was named after the armoured car which Baker had used during the war. As wartime paper rationing was continuing and Falcon Press was a newcomer without a large quota, he printed books in several foreign countries instead. The business was initially successful, enabling Baker to build up a "minor business empire" including four publishing companies, printing works, a wine merchants and a whisky distillery, aircraft research company, and a property business. Muriel Spark worked for Falcon Press from 1951. When Falcon Press ran into debt, Baker and Robert Maxwell (then making his name as a leading British publisher) planned to merge their respective publishing businesses; however the plans fell through. Maxwell eventually bought the British Book Centre in New York from Baker in 1952.

He was a frequent visitor at the Thursday Club, a raffish luncheon club located at Wheeler's oyster bar, in Old Compton Street, London, a men's eating and drinking group dedicated to "Absolute Inconsequence"; (Note: The Thursday club's spirit was that friends would meet once a week, no issues of importance would be allowed, no international question would be solved, eat well, tell stories and swap reminiscences.) other members included the actors David Niven, James Robertson Justice and Peter Ustinov, the future Duke of Edinburgh, the intelligence officer Kim Philby, celebrity photographer Stirling Henry Nahum, (known as Baron) and Baker's friend, Colonel Sean Fielding, editor of Tatler magazine and later of the Daily Express. Baker was also a member of the Junior Carlton Club.

== Political career ==
While a prisoner of war, Baker wrote an essay "in political diagnosis" to explain to a fellow prisoner why he supported the Conservative Party. After the war, he published the essay as "The Silent Revolution". He added an epilogue written late in 1945, giving some of his diary entries for the latter part of the war and reflecting on the impact of peace on the purposefulness of the wartime generation. At the same time, he also completed his war memoirs, which he had begun writing while a prisoner of war; the resulting book was titled Confession of Faith, and was also published by his own publishing company Falcon Press in 1946.

Persuaded by his friend James Thomas, at the time vice-chairman of the Conservative Party, to enter active politics, Baker agreed to let his name go forward for selection as the Conservative Party candidate for South Norfolk. The South Norfolk division was not far from where he had grown up, but Baker found that the local Conservatives were divided between an official Conservative Association and an Independent Conservative Association. The South Norfolk Independent Conservative Association had been set up by supporters of John Holt Wilson in 1944, after a dispute over the previous selection. Although feelings between the two Associations were still tense, both participated in the selection. Baker won easily, beating Eric Smith and John Holt Wilson. He had already decided that he needed to reunify local Conservatives, and brokered a joint constitution in which officers of both would be represented at every level. His solution was accepted despite breaking most of the model rules sent by Conservative Central Office.

=== Parliament ===
In the 1950 general election, Baker gained the seat with 18,143 votes, defeating the Labour candidate, Christopher Mayhew (15,714 votes), who was the poll favourite. Aged 28, he was then the youngest MP ("Baby of the House"). He was returned again in the 1951 general election and took an interest in agricultural matters in Parliament. In June 1953, Baker invited US Senator Joseph McCarthy to visit England and see Democracy at work and offered to let McCarthy stay at his London home or at his house in Pulham St Mary, Norfolk. He later became chairman of an ill-fated movement called the Company of Commonwealth Venturers whose main goal was to promote a 'new Elizabethan Age' among Commonwealth countries. Baker improvised a Pageant to fill the Royal Albert Hall in 1954, 15,000 supporters requested the 8,000 seats available.

== Health ==
When he had arrived back in Britain at the end of the war, Baker's doctor had given him a check-up and told him to take six months' rest, the first half in bed, as his heart was in a poor condition. The military authorities also recommended two small operations. Baker disregarded their advice and entered business.

Baker suffered a nervous breakdown in 1954, which he ascribed to his excessive workload as both a member of parliament and a businessman single-handedly running many companies (which were in financial difficulties). He claimed to have had multiple day-time blackouts and to have attempted suicide twice before he became a voluntary patient in a nursing home. In May 1954, he announced that he would not seek re-election due to ill-health. While in the nursing home, he agreed to revise his war memoirs Confession of Faith and add his post-war life story, which he intended to be published under the title Testament of Faith.

== Downfall ==
Falcon Press began to encounter financial difficulties in the early 1950s. The official receiver was called in to Falcon Press (London) Ltd in 1954, and discovered a total deficiency of £290,823. A creditors' meeting in July 1954 was told that the company was "well on the rocks" by March 1950, and so often had a sheriff's officer attended at the company offices that the staff had bought a wreath on learning of his death. With Baker himself in the nursing home, his father (who was also a director) claimed that high production costs, insufficiently selective choice of books to publish and insufficient sales pressure, were responsible for the failure.

When Baker's companies came into financial trouble, he forged signatures on letters purporting to guarantee their debts. Baker was arrested and charged with seven counts of uttering forged documents, and pleaded guilty to six of the counts. Prosecuting counsel were Christmas Humphreys and Mervyn Griffith-Jones, while Baker was defended by Richard Levy and James Burge.

He was subsequently convicted on all seven counts and was sentenced at the Old Bailey to seven years imprisonment. Immediately on his imprisonment at HM Prison Wormwood Scrubs, Baker was given permission by the Prison Governor to write to the Speaker of the House of Commons. (Note: In Time Out of Life, pp. 31–32, Baker claims he had to write a second time because the Wormwood Scrubs authorities always tore up the first letter any prisoner sent to an MP.) Explaining that he had discovered he was "unable to vacate my seat in any way while the matter was sub judice", he stated that he was not going to appeal and therefore "you can now dispossess me of my seat without delay". The Leader of the House of Commons, Harry Crookshank, then put down a motion "That Mr. Peter Arthur David Baker be expelled this House" which was agreed without a division on 16 December 1954. In the subsequent by-election in January 1955, South Norfolk elected Conservative John Hill as its new MP.

== Prison ==
His literary agent, Anthony Blond, and publisher, John Calder, were allowed to visit Baker occasionally to discuss the publication of his book, for which he had left only "a chaotic welter of hand-written chapters, and extracts from articles, newspaper interviews and broadcasts" which Blond and Calder had to assemble into a logical sequence. Blond and Calder eventually published the book under the title My Testament, which Baker had not approved. While in Wormwood Scrubs, Baker met up with Raymond Blackburn, a former MP who had also been imprisoned for fraud. Baker had not known Blackburn well when in Parliament (Blackburn had been a Labour MP) but had become friendly with him afterwards.

On 12 May 1955, during the general election campaign, Baker was taken from prison to the Bankruptcy court for his public examination. His liabilities were stated as £335,598 8s 10d, and he had assets of £10 19s 1d. Baker presented the court with 212 pages of evidence, and spent three hours in the witness box. He blamed his bankruptcy on the withdrawal of support by Sir Bernard Docker, and at the end of his evidence he asserted that his plea of guilty had been incorrect.

=== Appeal ===
During his evidence, Baker had told the court that he intended to petition for a retrial; he had previously decided that he would only do so after he had been expelled from the House of Commons, and a by-election in South Norfolk and a general election had been held. As he was bankrupt, his legal case was funded by friends including William Rees-Mogg, Anthony Nutting, William Teeling, Martha Gellhorn and his legal adviser Hugh Quennell.

Baker duly petitioned to the Home Secretary in May 1955, asking for either a retrial, an appeal out of time (with permission to change his plea to not guilty), a public inquiry, or an immediate release. Talks between Baker's solicitors and the Home Office were inconclusive, so Baker's solicitors applied to the Court of Criminal Appeal. Mr Justice Donovan refused Baker permission for leave to appeal out of time against his conviction on the papers, so Baker renewed his appeal at a hearing in the Court of Criminal Appeal on 21 November 1955. The hearing was adjourned on application of Baker's counsel, because they were not ready.

Baker later claimed that Hugh Quennell had obtained assurances that the Home Office intended to procure his release by March 1956 at the outside, and so he reluctantly agreed to withdraw his appeal and let the Home Office proceed. The appeal was withdrawn on 16 December, his solicitors announcing that there were legal and technical difficulties in appealing after a guilty plea and in arranging a new trial. Baker's memorandum to the Home Office was met only with an official rejection.

=== Second appeal ===
At the end of 1956, Baker prepared a second application for leave to appeal, with his solicitor Brian Hetreed preparing a large bundle of documents and witnesses (including, according to Baker, two former Chief Justices). However junior counsel John Mathew was doubtful of the chances of a retrial unless Baker had been insane when he pleaded guilty. On 28 January 1957, Baker was indeed refused leave to appeal, to argue for a change of plea, for extension of time, to call new witnesses and to produce new evidence, with the Lord Chief Justice Lord Goddard pointing out that his plea of guilty must stand. Immediately after this appeal was dismissed, Baker was transferred from Wormwood Scrubs to HM Prison Leyhill, an open prison.

From there Baker sent a request to the Speaker of the House of Commons asking that his case be referred to the Committee of Privileges, to inquire into why he pleaded guilty and to allegations of perjury and withholding of evidence. He claimed to have received "more than seventy letters of encouragement" when his request was publicised. His attempts to circumvent restrictions on letters from prison were detected and resulted in his transfer back to closed conditions, first at Horfield and then back to Wormwood Scrubs.

=== Release ===
Baker was released from Wormwood Scrubs on 23 October 1959, being met at the prison gates by his father and by Lord Pakenham. Shortly after his release he gave an interview to the Daily Express, (Note: Baker later said that he had refused all requests for interviews except this one, because an executive on the paper was an old friend.) in which he declared his intention to bring back his wife and children from Australia, where they had moved without warning in the summer of 1958, leaving no address but arranging for letters to be forwarded through a bank.

On 4 November, Baker called a press conference on "the weaknesses of justice and prison administration in Britain", which he explained as an apology for hiding from the press, and an attempt to prove that this was not from fear.

== Later life ==
Baker's creditors received only 0.1611d. in the £ (or 0.067%), in the first dividend paid after his bankruptcy; when he applied for discharge from bankruptcy on 17 December 1959, the discharge was suspended. In April 1962, his discharge from bankruptcy was allowed after a two years and six months suspension. A supplemental dividend was paid to creditors in May 1963 of 0.196d. in the £ (or 0.08%), making less than 0.15% in total.

In February 1960, Baker asked Robert Maxwell for an appointment as a Director of his new publishing company; Maxwell refused. He wrote his prison memoirs, published under the title Time Out of Life by Heinemann in 1961; in them Baker claimed his financial downfall was caused by his financial guarantors repudiating their signatures, and that he had always believed them to be genuine. He could not explain why he had pleaded guilty. The book included a foreword from Pakenham, by then the Earl of Longford, who praised it as a "valuable contribution" to understanding the prison system.

In March 1961, he was cleared of causing death by dangerous driving, (Note: In My Testament, p. 247, Baker acknowledged his careless driving when describing a 1949 dinner event. Having offered to drive Conservative politician Anthony Eden to the House of Commons, Baker drove so recklessly that he completed five circuits of the roundabout on the Embankment before delivering Eden, green and apprehensive, at the House. Eden never forgave Baker for that.) having knocked down a pedestrian on a crossing in the Strand; Baker said that he overtook a taxi whose driver had signalled to him that it was safe to do so. He was divorced from his wife in November 1961, on grounds of her desertion.

Attempts to overturn his conviction or to hold an inquiry continued. In September 1963, Baker persuaded Earl Attlee, the former Labour Prime Minister, to support an inquiry. Baker unsuccessfully petitioned for a Royal Pardon in 1965. On 4 April 1966, his creditors filed a new bankruptcy petition against him; a receiving order was made on 22 July 1966, and on 26 September, he was again adjudicated a bankrupt. He died in hospital in Eastbourne on 14 November 1966, aged 45.

== Literary depiction ==
Baker is depicted as Martin York in Muriel Spark's novel A Far Cry from Kensington. York, like Baker, is sentenced to seven years' imprisonment "for multiple forgeries and other types of fraud"; the date of his imprisonment is also 1 December 1954. In the novel, Nancy Hawkins (based on Spark) describes how Martin York frequently makes promises to publish books written by his friends, but the books they write are not always acceptable, and she turns down one manuscript from a friend of York's who had been offered a contract during a drinking session. York relays to Hawkins advice to send a cheque for a random amount in income tax, so that it cannot be tallied with any amount owing and results in the taxpayers' file being passed around and eventually lost. She describes seeing York signing documents in his own handwriting but in other people's names. York remarks to Hawkins that "if it is widely enough believed that you have money and wealth, it is the same thing as having it. The belief itself creates confidence and confidence, business."

== Works ==
- The Beggar's Lute (set of twenty-one poems), Favil Press, 1940
- Confession of Faith, Falcon Press, 1946
- The Silent Revolution, Falcon Press, 1946
- Land and Empire, Falcon Press, 1948
- My Testament, John Calder, London, 1955
- Time Out of Life, Heinemann, London, 1961

== Bibliography ==
- Foot, M.R.D.; Langley, J.M (1980). MI9 Escape and Evasion, 1939-1945. Boston`: Little, Brown and Company. pp. 217–221. ISBN 0316288403.

Parliament of the United Kingdom
Preceded by Maj. Christopher Mayhew	Member of Parliament for South Norfolk; 1950–1954 expelled 16 December 1954	Succeeded by John Hill
Preceded by Roy Jenkins	Baby of the House; 1950	Succeeded by Tony Benn
