= Clare Sewell Read =

British agriculturist and politician (1826–1905)

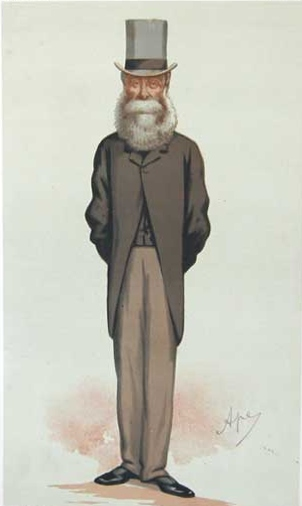
"A tenant Farmer" As depicted by "Ape" (Carlo Pellegrini) in Vanity Fair, 5 June 1875

Clare Sewell Read (6 November 1826 – 21 August 1905) was a British agriculturist and Conservative politician.

== Early life ==
He was born in 1826 in Ketteringham, Norfolk, and was the eldest son of George Read of Barton Bendish Hall, and his wife Sarah Anne, daughter of Clare Sewell. The family had been farming land in Norfolk for three centuries, and following private education in King's Lynn Read spent five years learning practical agriculture on his father's farm at Plumstead. Subsequently, he managed large farms in Pembrokeshire and Oxfordshire, before returning to Plumstead in 1854. In 1865 he inherited an 800-acre (3.2 km^{2}) farm at Honingham Thorpe, which he farmed for the next three decades. He was described in 1870 as "a yeoman and tenant farmer on an extensive scale".

== Family ==
In 1859 he married Sarah Maria Watson daughter of a former Sheriff of Norwich, and they had four daughters.

== House of Commons ==
In 1865 he was elected as a Conservative Member of Parliament for East Norfolk. On the redistribution of seats in 1868 he became one of two MPs for South Norfolk. Politically he described himself as a "liberal Conservative", supporting the equitable settlement of the Irish land question. He was also a champion of agricultural interests, and sought the abolition of the malt tax.

In 1874 he was appointed to a junior ministerial post in the Second Disraeli ministry as Parliamentary Secretary to the Local Government Board. He resigned in January 1876 in protest against the government's policy on controlling the spread of foot and mouth disease, when the government failed to extend the Cattle Diseases Act to Ireland. He was presented with a cheque for 5,500 pounds by English farming organisations in recognition of his stand on the issue. He lost his seat in parliament at the 1880 general election by a single vote.

Following the loss of his seat, he refused candidacies at North Lincolnshire and Cambridgeshire. In 1884 the sitting member for West Norfolk resigned, and Read was elected unopposed to fill the vacancy at the ensuing by-election. His return to the Commons was only brief, however, as he chose not to stand at the 1885 general election. He was persuaded to stand at Norwich when a further election was called in 1886. He did not take the seat, and did not make any more attempts to enter parliament.

== Agriculturist ==
Read was a recognised authority on matters agricultural. In 1848, 1854 and 1856 he was awarded prizes by the Royal Agricultural Society for reports on farming in South Wales, Oxfordshire and Buckinghamshire. In 1866 he joined the Farmers Club, and twice served as its chairman. He was at various times a member of the Smithfield Club, vice president of the Central Chamber of Agriculture, and president of the Norfolk Chamber of Agriculture. He was frequently a judge at major agricultural shows, including the Royal Show, the Smithfield Show and the Royal Bath and West Show.

In 1879 a Royal Commission on the Depressed State of the Agricultural Interest under the chairmanship of the Duke of Richmond was appointed. Along with Albert Pell, Read was made an assistant commissioner, and the two men visited the United States and Canada to inquire into the production and export of wheat. Over six months the two assistant commissioners travelled 16,000 miles (26,000 km).

== Later life ==
Although no longer in parliament, Read continued to represent the interests of farmers through the societies of which he was a leading member. In 1892 he was called as an expert witness before a Board of Trade investigation into corn sales, and in 1894 appeared before the Royal Commission on Agriculture. In 1896 Read retired from farming, and in the following year the landlords and tenant farmers of Norfolk formally presented Read with his portrait at a ceremony at the Norwich Shire Hall to mark their "deep sense... of the value of the services that he had rendered to agriculture".

On retirement, Read moved to London, taking up residence at 91 Kensington Gardens Square. In his latter years he was a supporter of the Royal Society for the Prevention of Cruelty to Animals, seeking to promote humane methods of slaughtering domestic animals.

Clare Sewell Read died at his London home in August 1905. He was buried in Barton Bendish, Norfolk.

Parliament of the United Kingdom
Preceded by Edward Howes; Hon. Wenman Coke	Member of Parliament for East Norfolk; 1865–1868; With: Hon. Wenman Coke	Constituency abolished
New constituency	Member of Parliament for South Norfolk; 1868–1880; With: Edward Howes	Succeeded by Edward Howes; Sir Robert Buxton, Bt.
Preceded by William Tyssen-Amherst; G W P Bentinck	Member of Parliament for West Norfolk; 1884–1885; With: William Tyssen-Amherst	Constituency abolished
Political offices
Preceded by John Tomlinson Hibbert	Parliamentary Secretary to the Local Government Board; 1874–1876	Succeeded by Thomas Salt
