= John MacGregor, Baron MacGregor of Pulham Market =

British politician (born 1937)

The Right Honourable The Lord MacGregor of Pulham Market OBE PC FKC
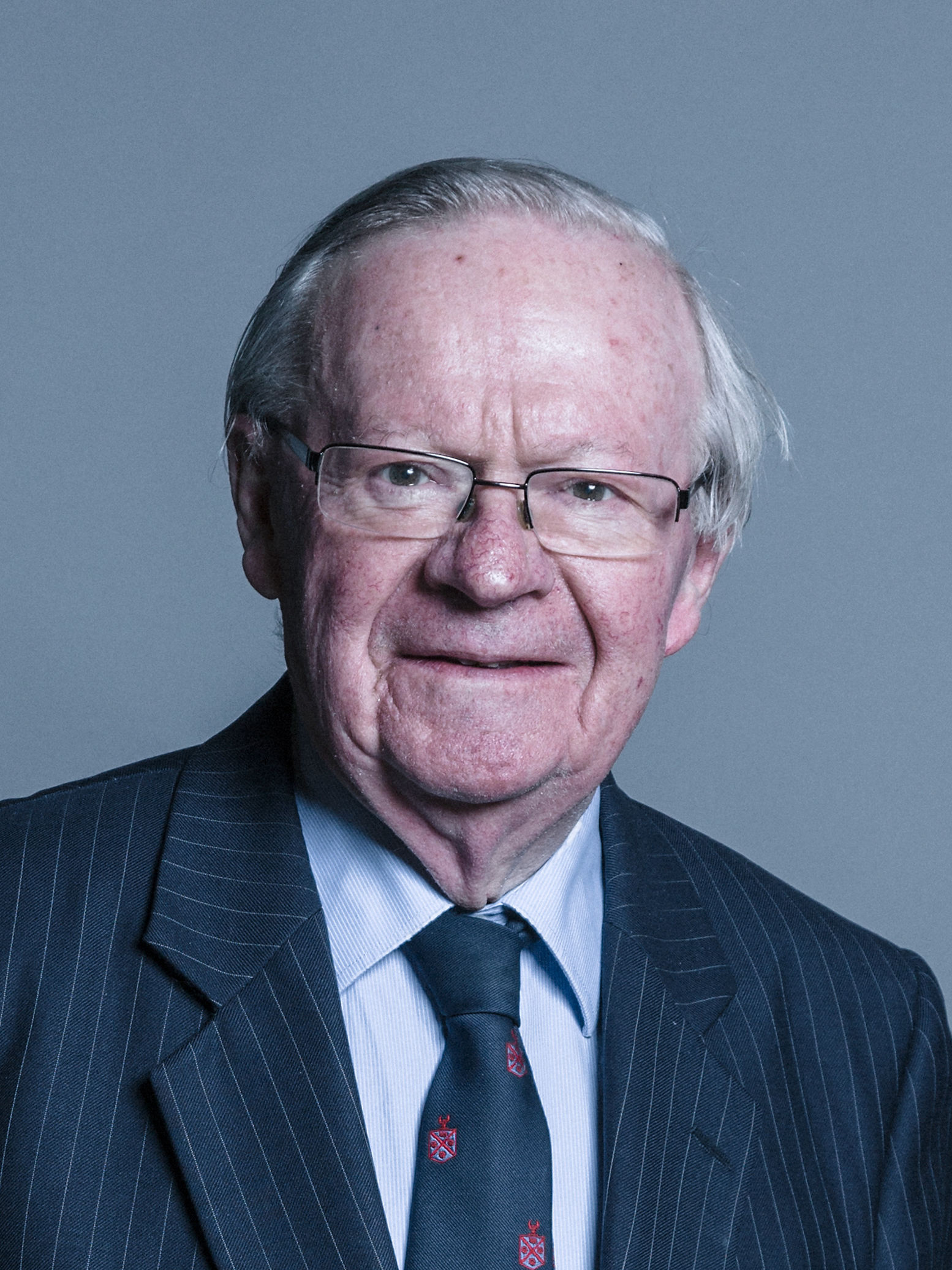
- Parliamentary portrait, 2018

Secretary of State for Transport
- In office 11 April 1992 – 20 July 1994
- Prime Minister: John Major
- Preceded by: Malcolm Rifkind
- Succeeded by: Brian Mawhinney

Leader of the House of Commons Lord President of the Council
- In office 2 November 1990 – 11 April 1992
- Prime Minister: Margaret Thatcher; John Major
- Preceded by: Geoffrey Howe
- Succeeded by: Tony Newton

Secretary of State for Education and Science
- In office 24 July 1989 – 2 November 1990
- Prime Minister: Margaret Thatcher
- Preceded by: Kenneth Baker
- Succeeded by: Kenneth Clarke

Secretary of State for Agriculture, Fisheries and Food
- In office 13 June 1987 – 24 July 1989
- Prime Minister: Margaret Thatcher
- Preceded by: Michael Jopling
- Succeeded by: John Gummer

Chief Secretary to the Treasury
- In office 2 September 1985 – 13 June 1987
- Prime Minister: Margaret Thatcher
- Chancellor: Nigel Lawson
- Preceded by: Peter Rees
- Succeeded by: John Major

Lord Commissioner of HM Treasury
- In office 4 May 1979 – 5 January 1981
- Prime Minister: Margaret Thatcher

Member of Parliament for South Norfolk
- In office 28 February 1974 – 14 May 2001
- Preceded by: John Hill
- Succeeded by: Richard Bacon

Member of the House of Lords
- Lord Temporal
- Life peerage 5 July 2001 – 26 July 2019

Personal details
- Born: 14 February 1937 (age 89) London, England
- Party: Conservative
- Education: University of St Andrews; King's College London

John Roddick Russell MacGregor, Baron MacGregor of Pulham Market, OBE, PC, FKC (born 14 February 1937), is a British politician. A member of the Conservative Party, he was the Member of Parliament (MP) for South Norfolk from 1974 to 2001. He served in the Cabinet as Chief Secretary to the Treasury (1985–87), Minister of Agriculture, Fisheries and Food (1987–89), Secretary of State for Education and Science (1989–90), Leader of the House of Commons and Lord President of the Council (1990–92), and Secretary of State for Transport (1992–94). He was made a life peer in 2001.

== Early life ==
MacGregor was educated at Merchiston Castle School in Edinburgh, then at the University of St Andrews (MA economics and history, 1959) and at King's College London (LLB, 1962). Prior to the 1979 general election he worked for Hill Samuel, a merchant bank.

== Member of Parliament ==
MacGregor became an MP at the February 1974 General Election, and served as a Tory whip from 1977 to 1981, when he became a junior minister at the Department of Trade and Industry, moving to MAFF in 1983.

=== In government ===
MacGregor entered the Cabinet on 2 September 1985 as Chief Secretary to the Treasury, and was made Minister of Agriculture, Fisheries and Food in 1987 – during the BSE crisis. He was promoted to Secretary of State for Education and Science in July 1989. In the small reshuffle following the resignation of Sir Geoffrey Howe, he was made Leader of the House of Commons and Lord President of the Council just days before Thatcher's own resignation. He continued in this position from 1990 to 1992, although William Keegan writes that he was a contender for the position of Chancellor when John Major came to power.

MacGregor was appointed Secretary of State for Transport in 1992, remaining in the post until July 1994 when was dismissed from the cabinet. His time as Transport Secretary saw him given responsibility for the privatisation of British Rail and the decision to privatise the Transport Research Laboratory (TRL). He was made a life peer as Baron MacGregor of Pulham Market, of Pulham Market in the County of Norfolk on 5 July 2001. He sat in the House of Lords until his retirement on 26 July 2019.

== Honours ==
MacGregor was appointed an Officer of the Order of the British Empire (OBE) in the 1971 New Year Honours for political services.

Coat of arms of John MacGregor, Baron MacGregor of Pulham Market
Crest A boar rampant Azure armed langued and crined Or bearing a lyre Or stringed Argent. Escutcheon Argent a sword in bend Azure hilted and pommelled Or surmounted by an oak tree eradicated and fructed Proper its trunk enfiled with five antique crowns of the third on a chief per pale Vert and Gules two portcullises chains pendent of the third. Supporters A stag Gules bearing a magician's wand Sable tipped Argent and having about its neck a chain from which is pendent a money purse Or sinister a winged lion guardant Or also bearing a magicians's wand Sable tipped Argent and having about its neck a chain from which is pendent a close book Gules. Motto To Thyself Aye True

== Personal interests ==
MacGregor is an accomplished magician and member of the Magic Circle. His passion for magic started when he was given a conjuring set at the age of 11. He gave regular performances on British television, including guest spots on The Best of Magic and an annual children's charity programme on Anglia Television.

Parliament of the United Kingdom
Preceded by John Hill	Member of Parliament for South Norfolk; 1974–2001	Succeeded by Richard Bacon
Political offices
Preceded by Peter Rees	Chief Secretary to the Treasury; 1985–1987	Succeeded by John Major
Preceded by Michael Jopling	Minister of State for Agriculture, Fisheries and Food; 1987–1989	Succeeded by John Gummer
Preceded by Kenneth Baker	Secretary of State for Education and Science; 1989–1990	Succeeded by Kenneth Clarke
Preceded by Geoffrey Howe	Lord President of the Council; 1990–1992	Succeeded by Tony Newton
Preceded by Geoffrey Howe	Leader of the House of Commons; 1990–1992	Succeeded by Tony Newton
Preceded by Malcolm Rifkind	Secretary of State for Transport; 1992–1994	Succeeded by Brian Mawhinney
Orders of precedence in the United Kingdom
Preceded by The Lord Campbell-Savours	Gentlemen; Baron MacGregor of Pulham Market	Followed by The Lord Jones
