= Edward Howes =

English Conservative Party politician

Edward Howes M.P.
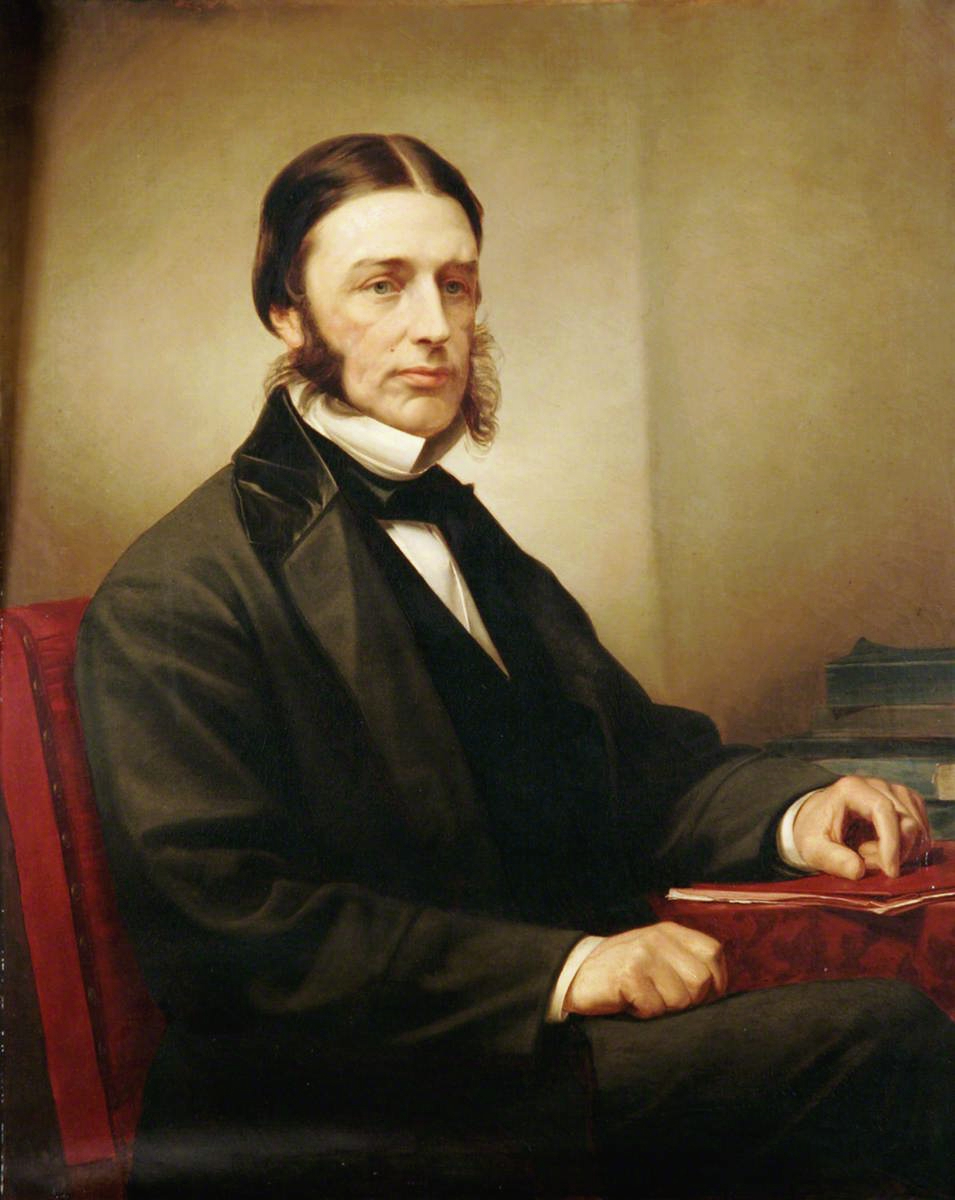
- Portrait of Edward Howes by Frederick Sandys
- Born: 1813
- Died: 1871 (aged 57–58)
- Occupations: lawyer, politician

Edward Howes DL (7 July 1813 – 26 March 1871) was an English Conservative Party politician who sat in the House of Commons from 1859 to 1871.

== Life ==
Howes was the son of Rev. George Howes, rector of Spixworth, Norfolk, and his wife Elizabeth Fellowes, daughter of Robert Fellowes of Shotesham Park, Norwich.

He was educated at St Paul's School and at Trinity College, Cambridge. He was Bell Scholar in 1832, scholar in 1833, Porson Prize winner in 1834 and winner of the 2nd Chancellor's medal in 1835. He graduated BA in 1835 and MA in 1838. He was elected a Fellow of Trinity College in 1836 and was called to the bar at Lincoln's Inn in June 1839. He did not practise as a barrister but was an equity draftsman and conveyancer. He lived at Morningthorpe, Norfolk and was a Deputy Lieutenant and J.P. for Norfolk. He became chairman of the Quarter Sessions for Norfolk in 1848, and a Church Estates Commissioner in 1866.

Howes was elected as a Member of Parliament (MP) for East Norfolk at the 1859 general election and held the seat until it was abolished in 1868. At the 1868 general election he was elected MP for South Norfolk. He held the seat until his death aged 57 in 1871. He was opposed to the Malt Tax, and all attempts to " impair the influence of the Church of England."

Howes married firstly in 1842 Agnes Maria Gwyn, daughter of Richard Gwyn. She died in 1843 and he married secondly in September 1851, Fanny Fellowes, daughter of Robert Fellowes the younger of Shotesham Park.

Parliament of the United Kingdom
Preceded by Charles Ash Windham; Wenman Coke	Member of Parliament for East Norfolk; 1859–1868; With: Wenman Coke to 1865; Clare Sewell Read from 1865	Constituency abolished
New constituency	Member of Parliament for South Norfolk; 1868–1871; With: Clare Sewell Read	Succeeded by Clare Sewell Read; Sir Robert Buxton
Church of England titles
Preceded by Spencer Horatio Walpole	Third Church Estates Commissioner; 1866–1871	Succeeded by John Robert Mowbray
