= 1871 South Norfolk by-election =

UK Parliamentary by-election

The 1871 South Norfolk by-election was fought on 17 April 1871. The by-election was fought due to the death of the incumbent MP of the Conservative Party, Edward Howes. It was won by the Conservative candidate Sir Robert Jacob Buxton.
