= South Norfolk (constituency) =

Parliamentary constituency in the United Kingdom, 1868 onwards

Coordinates: 52.54°N 1.39°E

- County constituency for the House of Commons
- Interactive map of boundaries since 2024
- Location within the East of England
- County: Norfolk
- Electorate: 69,837 (March 2020)
- Major settlements: Wymondham, Long Stratton, Loddon, Hethersett

Current constituency
- Created: 1868
- Member of Parliament: Ben Goldsborough (Labour)
- Seats: 1868–1885: Two; 1885 onwards: One
- Created from: East Norfolk; West Norfolk

South Norfolk is a constituency (Note: A county constituency (for the purposes of election expenses and type of returning officer)) in the House of Commons of the UK Parliament represented by Ben Goldsborough, a member of the Labour Party, after winning South Norfolk’s seat in the 2024 general election.

== Constituency profile ==
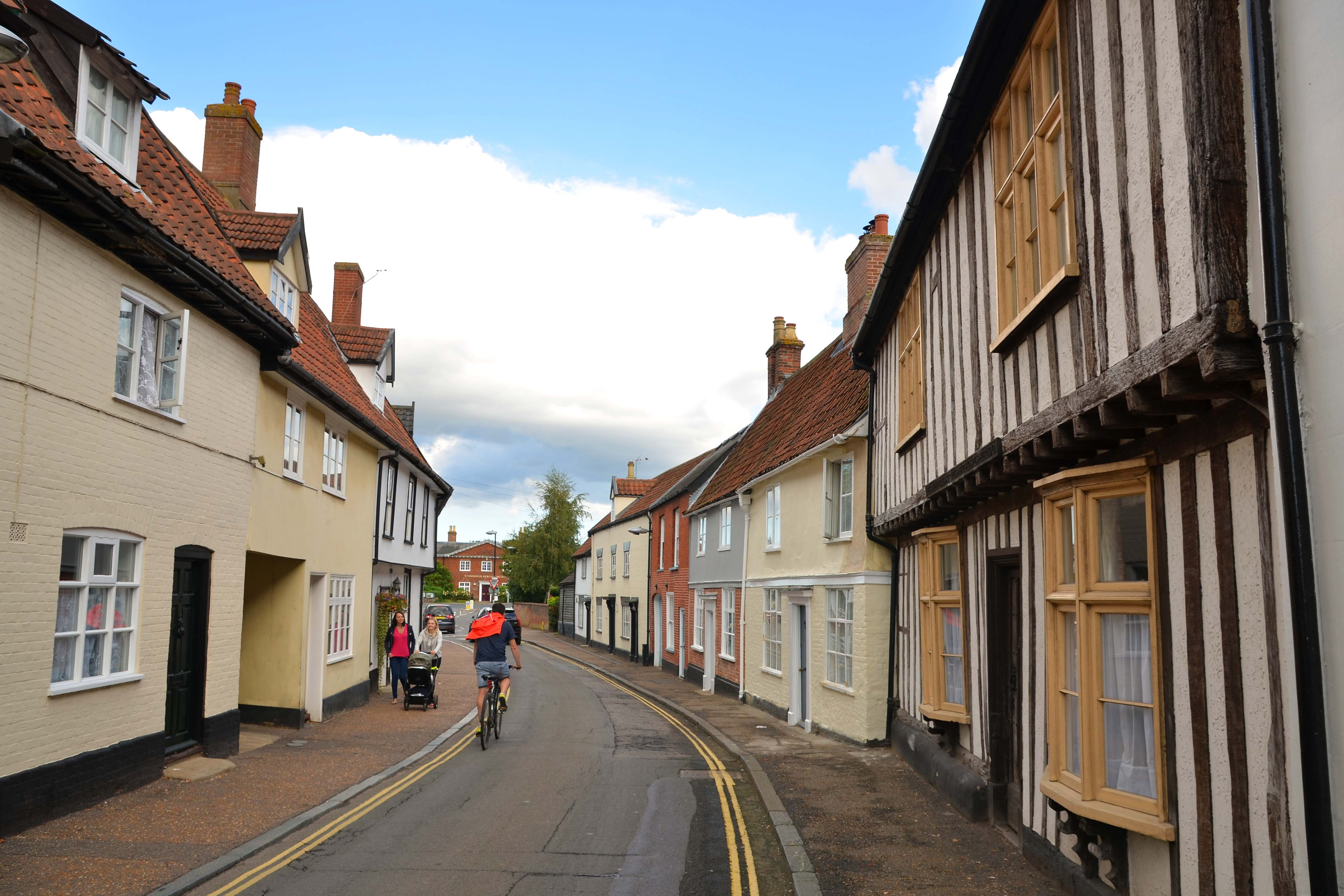
Bridewell Street, Wymondham

South Norfolk is a constituency in Norfolk in the East of England, within the district of the same name. Its largest town is Wymondham, which has a population of around 18,000. Other settlements include the towns of Costessey, Long Stratton and Loddon and the villages of Hethersett, Cringleford, Mulbarton and Poringland.

This is a large, rural constituency covering the areas south of Norwich, containing many small market towns and villages. Wymondham is a historic town that has undergone suburban development in recent decades, largely turning it into a commuter town. Similar developments have been built in many of the constituency's villages that lie on the outskirts of Norwich. The east of the constituency is within the Broads, a national park of navigable lakes and rivers. Most of South Norfolk is wealthy with low levels of deprivation. House prices are generally similar to the UK average but lower than the rest of the East of England.

South Norfolk has a low proportion of young adults and an above-average retired population. Residents have high levels of income and homeownership and the child poverty rate is low. They have average levels of education and a high proportion work in the agriculture and health sectors; just outside Cringleford is the Norwich Research Park which contains the large Norfolk and Norwich University Hospital. The percentage of residents claiming unemployment benefits is low. White people made up 95% of the population at the 2021 census.

At the local council level, the rural areas are predominantly represented by Conservatives whilst the towns and large villages mostly elected Liberal Democrat and Labour Party councillors. An estimated 51% of voters in South Norfolk supported remaining in the European Union in the 2016 referendum, marginally higher than the UK-wide figure of 48%.

== History ==
Following the Reform Act 1832 the historic county constituency Norfolk was for the first time split into two, two member, county divisions - East Norfolk and West Norfolk.

The Reform Act 1867 led, the following year, to the county's redistribution into three, two member, county divisions. The three divisions, from the 1868 United Kingdom general election became this one, the North and modified Western division.

The Southern division had its place of election (Note: Where the hustings stood, at which nominations were made, votes cast before the introduction of multiple polling districts in county constituencies and the result was declared) at Norwich. This was the same place of election as the abolished Eastern division. In 1868 the same two MPs who had sat for East Norfolk were re-elected for this constituency.

Under the provisions of the Redistribution of Seats Act 1885, single member constituencies became the norm and greater equalisation in electorate occurred. In Norfolk the three, two member, county divisions were changed to six single member seats. These were this constituency, a revived East Norfolk, Mid Norfolk, North Norfolk, North West Norfolk and South West Norfolk.

The Southern division was very agricultural in character. The largest town was Diss, which had a population of fewer than 4,000 people in 1900.

The seat voted in Liberal-affiliated MPs for over three decades until the 1920s, when it briefly alternated between the Labour and Conservative parties, though aside from a brief period of Labour representation between 1945-50, it gradually became a safe Conservative seat for generations, until Labour won it in 2024 for the first time in nearly eight decades.

== Boundaries and boundary changes ==
=== Historic ===
==== 1868–1885 ====
- The Hundreds of Walsham, Blofield, Henstead, Humbleyard, Loddon, Clavering, Diss, Deepwade, Earsham, Guiltcross, Shropham, Taverham, Forhoe, and Mitford.

The seat was formed largely from southern parts of the abolished Eastern Division, with a small part transferred from the Western Division.

==== 1885–1918 ====
- The Sessional Divisions of Depwade, Diss, Earsham, Loddon and Clavering, and Swainsthorpe.

The northernmost parts were transferred to the re-established Eastern Division and western parts to the new Mid Division. It bordered Mid Norfolk to the west, the borough constituency of Norwich and East Norfolk to the north, the borough of Great Yarmouth and the Suffolk constituency of Lowestoft to the east and another Suffolk division, Eye, to the south.

==== 1918–1950 ====
- The Urban District of Diss;
- The Rural Districts of Depwade, Forehoe, Henstead, and Wayland; and
- Part of the Rural District of Thetford.

Gained southern areas of the abolished Mid Division and a small area in the east of the South-Western Division. Lost eastern areas, which comprised the Loddon and Clavering Rural District (later renamed the Loddon Rural District), to the Eastern Division.

==== 1950–1974 ====
- The Municipal Borough of Thetford;
- The Urban Districts of Diss and Wymondham; and
- The Rural Districts of Depwade, Loddon, and Wayland.

These areas combined to produce a somewhat more urban constituency than before. Thetford was transferred from South West Norfolk and the Rural District of Loddon regained from the abolished Eastern Division. The (combined) Rural District of Forehoe and Henstead was transferred to the new constituency of Central Norfolk, but Wymondham (which had been created as a separate Urban District in 1935) was retained.

==== 1974–1983 ====
- The Municipal Borough of Thetford;
- The Urban Districts of Diss and Wymondham; and
- The Rural Districts of Depwade, Forehoe and Henstead, Loddon, and Wayland.

Regained the Rural District of Forhoe and Henstead, including Costessey, from Central Norfolk, which was now abolished.

This was the last redistribution before a major reorganisation of local government, which amalgamated many of the smaller local authorities and which was reflected in the 1983 redistribution.

==== 1983–1997 ====
- District of South Norfolk.

Thetford and the area comprising the former Rural District of Wayland, including Attleborough, which had been included in the District of Breckland, were transferred to the redrawn South West Norfolk constituency.

==== 1997–2010 ====
- District of South Norfolk, except the wards of Cringleford and Colney, and New Costessey.

The two excluded wards were transferred to Norwich South.

Map of boundaries 2010–2024

==== 2010–2024 ====
- District of South Norfolk wards of Beck Vale, Bressingham and Burston, Brooke, Bunwell, Chedgrave and Thurton, Cringleford, Dickleburgh, Diss, Ditchingham and Broome, Earsham, Easton, Forncett, Gillingham, Harleston, Hempnall, Hethersett, Loddon, Mulbarton, Newton Flotman, Old Costessey, Poringland with the Framinghams, Rockland, Roydon, Scole, Stoke Holy Cross, Stratton, Tasburgh, and Thurlton.

Cringleford and Colney (but not New Costessey) were transferred back from Norwich South. Seven District of South Norfolk wards, including Wymondham and surrounding areas, were transferred to Mid Norfolk.

=== Current ===
Further to the 2023 review of Westminster constituencies, which came into effect for the 2024 general election, the composition of the constituency is as follows (as they existed on 1 December 2020):

- The District of South Norfolk wards of: Brooke; Central Wymondham; Cringleford; Easton; Forncett; Hempnall; Hethersett; Loddon & Chedgrave; Mulbarton & Stoke Holy Cross; Newton Flotman; North Wymondham; Old Costessey; Poringland, Framinghams & Trowse; Rockland; South Wymondham; Stratton; Thurlton.

The seat was subject to major changes, with areas to the north of the River Waveney, which forms the boundary between Norfolk and Suffolk - including the towns of Diss and Harleston - forming part of the newly created, cross-county boundary, constituency of Waveney Valley. As part compensation, the town of Wymondham was regained from Mid Norfolk. Other minor changes due to ward boundary revisions.

== Members of Parliament ==
=== MPs 1868 – 1885 (two seats) ===
Election	First member	First party	Second member	Second party
1868	Clare Sewell Read	Conservative	Edward Howes	Conservative
1871	Clare Sewell Read	Conservative	Sir Robert Buxton, Bt	Conservative
1880	Robert Gurdon	Liberal	Sir Robert Buxton, Bt	Conservative
1885	representation reduced to one member			

=== MPs since 1885 (one seat) ===
Soames

Cozens-Hardy

Election	Member	Party
1885	Francis Taylor	Liberal
1886	Francis Taylor	Liberal Unionist
1898 by-election	Arthur Soames	Liberal
1918	William Cozens-Hardy^{a}	Coalition Liberal
1920 by-election	George Edwards	Labour
1922	Thomas Hay	Conservative
1923	George Edwards	Labour
1924	James Christie	Conservative
1945	Christopher Mayhew	Labour
1950	Peter Baker ^{b}	Conservative
1955 by-election	John Hill	Conservative
Feb 1974	John MacGregor	Conservative
2001	Richard Bacon	Conservative
2024	Ben Goldsborough	Labour

Notes:-

- ^{a} Cozens-Hardy stood at the 1918 United Kingdom general election as a Liberal without the Coalition "coupon", but he took the Coalition Liberal whip when Parliament assembled in 1919.
- ^{b} Baker was expelled from the House of Commons in 1954 after being convicted of fraud, forgery and uttering and sentenced to seven years imprisonment.

== Elections ==
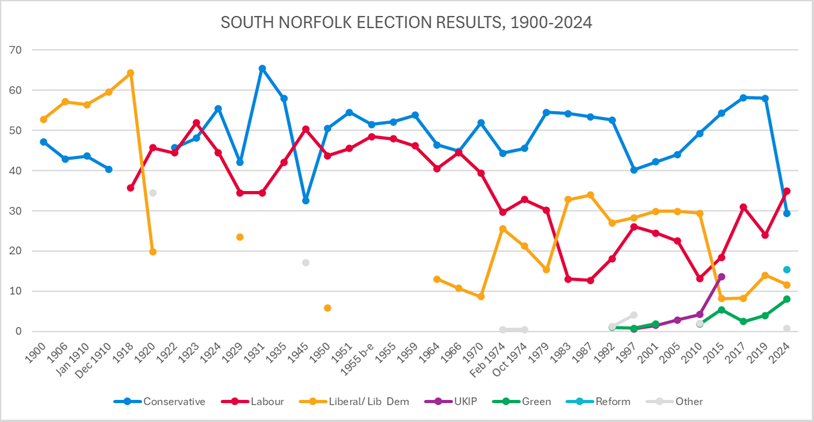
Election results 1900–2024

=== Elections in the 2020s ===
General election 2024: South Norfolk
Party	Candidate	Votes	%	±%
Labour	Ben Goldsborough	17,353	35.0	+11.6
Conservative	Poppy Simister-Thomas	14,527	29.3	−27.2
Reform	Chris Harrison	7,583	15.3	N/A
Liberal Democrats	Christopher Brown	5,746	11.6	−5.4
Green	Catherine Rowett	3,987	8.0	+4.8
Independent	Paco Davila	254	0.5	N/A
SDP	Jason Maguire	129	0.3	N/A
Majority		2,826	5.7	N/A
Turnout		49,579	66.9	−7.4
Registered electors		74,135		
Labour gain from Conservative		Swing	+19.4	

=== Elections in the 2010s ===
2019 notional result
Party	Vote	%
Conservative	29,298	56.5
Labour	12,123	23.4
Liberal Democrats	8,799	17.0
Green	1,637	3.2
Turnout	51,857	74.3
Electorate	69,837	

General election 2019: South Norfolk
Party	Candidate	Votes	%	±%
Conservative	Richard Bacon	36,258	58.0	−0.2
Labour	Beth Jones	14,983	24.0	−6.9
Liberal Democrats	Christopher Brown	8,744	14.0	+5.7
Green	Ben Price	2,499	4.0	+1.5
Majority		21,275	34.0	+6.7
Turnout		62,484	72.5	−1.1
Conservative hold		Swing	+3.4	

General election 2017: South Norfolk
Party	Candidate	Votes	%	±%
Conservative	Richard Bacon	35,580	58.2	+3.9
Labour	Danielle Glavin	18,902	30.9	+12.5
Liberal Democrats	Christopher Brown	5,074	8.3	+0.1
Green	Catherine Rowett	1,555	2.5	−2.9
Majority		16,678	27.3	−8.6
Turnout		61,111	73.6	+1.2
Conservative hold		Swing	−4.3	

General election 2015: South Norfolk
Party	Candidate	Votes	%	±%
Conservative	Richard Bacon	30,995	54.3	+5.0
Labour	Deborah Sacks	10,502	18.4	+5.2
UKIP	Barry Cameron	7,847	13.7	+9.5
Liberal Democrats	Jacky Howe	4,689	8.2	−21.2
Green	Catherine Rowett	3,090	5.4	+3.6
Majority		20,493	35.9	+16.0
Turnout		57,123	72.4	+0.2
Conservative hold		Swing		

General election 2010: South Norfolk
Party	Candidate	Votes	%	±%
Conservative	Richard Bacon	27,133	49.3	+4.6
Liberal Democrats	Jacky Howe	16,193	29.4	−0.4
Labour	Mick Castle	7,252	13.2	−9.3
UKIP	Evan Heasley	2,329	4.2	+1.4
BNP	Helen Mitchell	1,086	2.0	N/A
Green	Jo Willcott	1,000	1.8	N/A
Majority		10,940	19.9	+5.0
Turnout		54,993	72.2	+3.1
Conservative hold		Swing	+3.3	

=== Elections in the 2000s ===
General election 2005: South Norfolk
Party	Candidate	Votes	%	±%
Conservative	Richard Bacon	26,399	44.8	+2.6
Liberal Democrats	Ian Mack	17,617	29.9	±0.0
Labour	John Morgan	13,262	22.5	−2.0
UKIP	Philip Tye	1,696	2.9	+1.4
Majority		8,782	14.9	+2.6
Turnout		58,974	68.7	+1.1
Conservative hold		Swing	+1.3	

General election 2001: South Norfolk
Party	Candidate	Votes	%	±%
Conservative	Richard Bacon	23,589	42.2	+2.0
Liberal Democrats	Anne Lee	16,696	29.9	+1.6
Labour	Mark Wells	13,719	24.5	−1.6
Green	Stephanie Ross-Wagenknect	1,069	1.9	+1.1
UKIP	Joe Neal	856	1.5	+0.9
Majority		6,893	12.3	+0.4
Turnout		55,929	67.6	−10.8
Conservative hold		Swing	+0.2	

=== Elections in the 1990s ===
General election 1997: South Norfolk
Party	Candidate	Votes	%	±%
Conservative	John MacGregor	24,935	40.2	−12.4
Liberal Democrats	Barbara Hacker	17,557	28.3	+1.3
Labour	Jane Ross	16,188	26.1	+8.0
Referendum	Patricia Bateson	2,533	4.1	N/A
Green	Stephanie Ross-Wagenknecht	484	0.8	−0.2
UKIP	Anthony Boddy	400	0.6	N/A
Majority		7,378	11.9	−13.7
Turnout		62,097	78.4	−5.6
Conservative hold		Swing	−6.8	

General election 1992: South Norfolk
Party	Candidate	Votes	%	±%
Conservative	John MacGregor	36,081	52.6	−0.8
Liberal Democrats	Christopher Brocklebank-Fowler	18,516	27.0	−6.9
Labour	CJ Needle	12,422	18.1	+5.4
Green	S Ross-Wagenknecht	702	1.0	N/A
Natural Law	N Clark	320	0.5	N/A
Independent	R Peacock	304	0.4	N/A
Independent Conservative	R Watkins	232	0.3	N/A
Majority		17,565	25.6	+6.1
Turnout		68,577	84.0	+3.0
Conservative hold		Swing	+3.0	

=== Elections in the 1980s ===
General election 1987: South Norfolk
Party	Candidate	Votes	%	±%
Conservative	John MacGregor	33,912	53.4	−0.8
Liberal	Richard Carden	21,494	33.9	+1.1
Labour	Lloyd Addison	8,047	12.7	−0.3
Majority		12,418	19.5	−1.9
Turnout		63,453	81.0	+3.8
Conservative hold		Swing	−0.9	

General election 1983: South Norfolk
Party	Candidate	Votes	%	±%
Conservative	John MacGregor	30,747	54.2	−0.3
Liberal	Richard Carden	18,612	32.8	+17.5
Labour	Alan Holzer	7,408	13.0	−17.2
Majority		12,135	21.4	−2.9
Turnout		56,767	77.2	−1.8
Conservative hold		Swing	+4.7	

=== Elections in the 1970s ===
General election 1979: South Norfolk
Party	Candidate	Votes	%	±%
Conservative	John MacGregor	42,792	54.5	+9.0
Labour	PJ Davies	23,755	30.2	−2.6
Liberal	J Bristol	11,990	15.3	−5.9
Majority		19,037	24.3	+11.6
Turnout		78,537	78.4	+2.2
Conservative hold		Swing	+5.8	

General election October 1974: South Norfolk
Party	Candidate	Votes	%	±%
Conservative	John MacGregor	31,478	45.5	+1.2
Labour	Hugh Gray	22,713	32.8	+3.2
Liberal	M Scott	14,687	21.2	−4.4
United Democratic Party	CC Fairhead	317	0.5	±0.0
Majority		8,765	12.7	−2.0
Turnout		69,195	76.20	−6.59
Conservative hold		Swing	−1.0	

General election February 1974: South Norfolk
Party	Candidate	Votes	%	±%
Conservative	John MacGregor	33,059	44.3	
Labour	RJ Truman	22,040	29.6	
Liberal	M Scott	19,115	25.6	
Independent Progressive	CC Fairhead	337	0.5	N/A
Majority		11,019	14.7	
Turnout		74,551	82.79	
Conservative hold		Swing		

General election 1970: South Norfolk
Party	Candidate	Votes	%	±%
Conservative	John Hill	22,614	51.9	+7.1
Labour	Cyril Shaw	17,172	39.4	−5.1
Liberal	Basil Goldstone	3,811	8.7	−2.1
Majority		5,442	12.5	+12.2
Turnout		43,597	78.50	−2.90
Conservative hold		Swing		

=== Elections in the 1960s ===
General election 1966: South Norfolk
Party	Candidate	Votes	%	±%
Conservative	John Hill	16,968	44.78	
Labour	Geoffrey B L Bennett	16,849	44.46	
Liberal	Robert L Crouch	4,079	10.76	
Majority		119	0.32	
Turnout		37,896	81.40	
Conservative hold		Swing		

General election 1964: South Norfolk
Party	Candidate	Votes	%	±%
Conservative	John Hill	17,178	46.42	
Labour	Frank R Thompson	15,012	40.56	
Liberal	Barry HP Turner	4,819	13.02	N/A
Majority		2,166	5.86	
Turnout		37,009	82.7	
Conservative hold		Swing		

=== Elections in the 1950s ===
General election 1959: South Norfolk
Party	Candidate	Votes	%	±%
Conservative	John Hill	19,275	53.8	+1.7
Labour	John MacLennan Stewart	16,542	46.2	−1.7
Majority		2,733	7.6	+3.4
Turnout		35,817	82.4	+0.6
Conservative hold		Swing	+1.7	

General election 1955: South Norfolk
Party	Candidate	Votes	%	±%
Conservative	John Hill	18,690	52.1	−2.4
Labour	John MacLennan Stewart	17,215	47.9	+2.4
Majority		1,475	4.2	−4.8
Turnout		35,905	81.8	−0.6
Conservative hold		Swing	+0.6	

1955 South Norfolk by-election
Party	Candidate	Votes	%	±%
Conservative	John Hill	15,119	51.5	−3.0
Labour	John MacLennan Stewart	14,254	48.5	+3.0
Majority		865	3.0	−6.0
Turnout		29,373		
Conservative hold		Swing	−3.0	

General election 1951: South Norfolk
Party	Candidate	Votes	%	±%
Conservative	Peter Baker	19,610	54.5	+4.0
Labour	Lynton Scutts	16,371	45.5	+1.8
Majority		3,239	9.0	+3.2
Turnout		35,981	82.4	−1.2
Conservative hold		Swing	+1.1	

General election 1950: South Norfolk
Party	Candidate	Votes	%	±%
Conservative	Peter Baker	18,143	50.5	+18.0
Labour	Christopher Mayhew	15,714	43.7	−6.6
Liberal	George Q Bryant	2,097	5.8	N/A
Majority		2,429	6.8	N/A
Turnout		35,954	83.6	+24.6
Conservative gain from Labour		Swing	+12.3	

=== Election in the 1940s ===
General election 1945: Norfolk Southern
Party	Candidate	Votes	%	±%
Labour	Christopher Mayhew	16,825	50.3	+8.2
Conservative	John Sandeman Allen	10,862	32.5	−25.4
Ind. Conservative	John Holt Wilson	5,761	17.2	N/A
Majority		5,963	17.8	N/A
Turnout		33,448	69.0	−4.5
Registered electors		48,451		
Labour gain from Conservative		Swing	+16.8	

=== Elections in the 1930s ===
General election 1935: Norfolk Southern
Party	Candidate	Votes	%	±%
Conservative	James Christie	18,420	57.9	−7.6
Labour	Colin Clark	13,409	42.1	+7.6
Majority		5,011	15.8	−15.2
Turnout		31,829	73.5	−4.3
Registered electors		43,294		
Conservative hold		Swing	−7.6	

General election 1931: Norfolk Southern
Party	Candidate	Votes	%	±%
Conservative	James Christie	21,195	65.5	+23.5
Labour	Edwin Gooch	11,148	34.5	±0.0
Majority		10,047	31.0	+23.5
Turnout		32,343	77.8	+1.8
Registered electors		41,551		
Conservative hold		Swing	+11.8	

=== Elections in the 1920s ===
General election 1929: Norfolk South
Party	Candidate	Votes	%	±%
Unionist	James Christie	12,978	42.0	−13.5
Labour	George Young	10,686	34.5	−10.0
Liberal	Ieuan Watkins-Evans	7,268	23.5	N/A
Majority		2,292	7.5	−3.5
Turnout		30,932	76.0	−0.5
Registered electors		40,701		
Unionist hold		Swing	−1.7	

General election 1924: Norfolk South
Party	Candidate	Votes	%	±%
Unionist	James Christie	14,189	55.5	+7.4
Labour	George Edwards	11,376	44.5	−7.4
Majority		2,813	11.0	N/A
Turnout		25,565	76.5	+8.2
Registered electors		33,409		
Unionist gain from Labour		Swing	+7.4	

General election 1923: Norfolk South
Party	Candidate	Votes	%	±%
Labour	George Edwards	11,682	51.9	+7.5
Unionist	Thomas William Hay	10,821	48.1	−7.6
Majority		861	3.8	N/A
Turnout		22,503	68.3	−2.5
Registered electors		32,937		
Labour gain from Unionist		Swing	+7.5	

General election 1922: Norfolk South
Party	Candidate	Votes	%	±%
Unionist	Thomas William Hay	12,734	45.7	N/A
Labour	George Edwards	10,159	44.4	+8.7
Majority		2,575	3.7	N/A
Turnout		22,893	70.8	+12.3
Registered electors		32,326		
Unionist gain from Labour		Swing		

1920 South Norfolk by-election
Party	Candidate	Votes	%	±%
Labour	George Edwards	8,594	45.7	+10.0
National Liberal	James Henley Batty	6,476	34.5	−29.8
Liberal	Charles Roberts	3,718	19.8	N/A
Majority		2,118	11.2	N/A
Turnout		18,788	58.5	+2.7
Registered electors		32,131		
Labour gain from National Liberal		Swing		

=== Elections in the 1910s ===
General election 1918: Norfolk South
Party	Candidate	Votes	%	±%
National Liberal	William Cozens-Hardy	11,755	64.3	+4.7
Labour	George Edwards	6,536	35.7	N/A
Majority		5,219	28.6	+9.4
Turnout		18,291	55.8	−25.5
Registered electors		32,796		
National Liberal gain from Liberal		Swing		

General election, December 1910: Norfolk South
Party	Candidate	Votes	%	±%
Liberal	Arthur Soames	4,740	59.6	+3.2
Conservative	T.S. Timmis	3,212	40.4	−3.2
Majority		1,528	19.2	+6.4
Turnout		7,952	81.3	−5.4
Registered electors		9,779		
Liberal hold		Swing	+3.2	

General election, January 1910: Norfolk South
Party	Candidate	Votes	%	±%
Liberal	Arthur Soames	4,781	56.4	−0.7
Conservative	E.R.A. Kerrison	3,694	43.6	+0.7
Majority		1,087	12.8	−1.4
Turnout		8,475	86.7	+1.7
Registered electors		9,779		
Liberal hold		Swing	−0.7	

=== Elections in the 1900s ===
General election 1906: Norfolk South
Party	Candidate	Votes	%	±%
Liberal	Arthur Soames	4,677	57.1	+4.3
Conservative	Edward Mann	3,519	42.9	−4.3
Majority		1,158	14.2	+8.6
Turnout		8,196	85.0	+6.8
Registered electors		9,643		
Liberal hold		Swing	+4.3	

General election 1900: Norfolk South
Party	Candidate	Votes	%	±%
Liberal	Arthur Soames	3,986	52.8	+8.2
Conservative	Edward Mann	3,566	47.2	−8.2
Majority		420	5.6	N/A
Turnout		7,552	78.2	−0.3
Registered electors		9,654		
Liberal gain from Liberal Unionist		Swing	+8.2	

=== Elections in the 1890s ===
By-election, 1898: Norfolk South
Party	Candidate	Votes	%	±%
Liberal	Arthur Soames	4,626	58.4	+13.8
Conservative	John Sancroft Holmes	3,296	41.6	−13.8
Majority		1,330	16.8	N/A
Turnout		7,922	82.3	+3.8
Registered electors		9,625		
Liberal gain from Liberal Unionist		Swing		

General election 1895: Norfolk South
Party	Candidate	Votes	%	±%
Liberal Unionist	Francis Taylor	4,281	55.4	+0.6
Liberal	Thomas Hamer Dolbey	3,445	44.6	−0.6
Majority		836	10.8	+1.2
Turnout		7,726	78.5	−5.9
Registered electors		9,847		
Liberal Unionist hold		Swing	+0.6	

General election 1892: Norfolk South
Party	Candidate	Votes	%	±%
Liberal Unionist	Francis Taylor	4,288	54.8	N/A
Liberal	Arthur Kitching	3,535	45.2	N/A
Majority		753	9.6	N/A
Turnout		7,823	88.4	N/A
Registered electors		8,848		
Liberal Unionist hold		Swing	N/A	

=== Elections in the 1880s ===
General election 1886: Norfolk South
Party	Candidate	Votes	%	±%
Liberal Unionist	Francis Taylor	Unopposed		
Liberal Unionist gain from Liberal				

General election 1885: Norfolk South
Party	Candidate	Votes	%	±%
Liberal	Francis Taylor	4,530	55.8	+22.5
Conservative	Robert Buxton	3,588	44.2	−22.5
Majority		942	11.6	+11.6
Turnout		8,118	80.1	+1.5 (est)
Registered electors		10,141		
Liberal hold		Swing	+22.5	

General election 1880: Norfolk South (2 seats)
Party	Candidate	Votes	%	±%
Conservative	Robert Buxton	2,917	33.4	−0.6
Liberal	Robert Gurdon	2,906	33.3	−2.2
Conservative	Clare Sewell Read	2,905	33.3	+2.8
Turnout		5,823 (est)	78.6 (est)	+3.3
Registered electors		7,412		
Majority		11	0.1	−3.4
Conservative hold		Swing	−1.0	
Majority		1	0.0	N/A
Liberal gain from Conservative		Swing	−1.8	

=== Elections in the 1870s ===
General election 1874: Norfolk South (2 seats)
Party	Candidate	Votes	%	±%
Conservative	Clare Sewell Read	3,146	35.5	−4.1
Conservative	Robert Buxton	3,010	34.0	−5.0
Liberal	Robert Gurdon	2,699	30.5	+9.1
Majority		311	3.5	−14.1
Turnout		5,777 (est)	75.3 (est)	+13.6
Registered electors		7,667		
Conservative hold		Swing	−4.3	
Conservative hold		Swing	−4.8	

By-election, 17 Apr 1871: Norfolk South (1 seat)
Party	Candidate	Votes	%	±%
Conservative	Robert Buxton	2,868	53.0	−25.6
Liberal	Robert Gurdon	2,547	47.0	+25.6
Majority		321	6.0	−11.6
Turnout		5,415	70.2	+8.5
Registered electors		7,719		
Conservative hold		Swing	−25.6	

- Caused by Howes' death.

=== Elections in the 1860s ===
General election 1868: Norfolk South (2 seats)
Party	Candidate	Votes	%	±%
Conservative	Clare Sewell Read	3,097	39.6	
Conservative	Edward Howes	3,053	39.0	
Liberal	Henry Lombard Hudson	1,679	21.4	
Majority		1,374	17.6	
Turnout		4,754 (est)	61.7 (est)	
Registered electors		7,709		
Conservative win (new seat)				
Conservative win (new seat)				

== See also ==
- List of parliamentary constituencies in Norfolk
- List of parliamentary constituencies in the East of England (region)

== Sources ==
- Boundaries of Parliamentary Constituencies 1885-1972, compiled and edited by F.W.S. Craig (Parliamentary Reference Publications 1972)
- British Parliamentary Constituencies: A Statistical Compendium, by Ivor Crewe and Anthony Fox (Faber and Faber 1984)
- British Parliamentary Election Results 1832-1885, compiled and edited by F.W.S. Craig (The Macmillan Press 1977)
- British Parliamentary Election Results 1885-1918, compiled and edited by F.W.S. Craig (Macmillan Press 1974)
- British Parliamentary Election Results 1918-1949, compiled and edited by F.W.S. Craig (Macmillan Press, revised edition 1977)
- British Parliamentary Election Results 1950-1973, compiled and edited by F.W.S. Craig (Parliamentary Research Services 1983)
- Social Geography of British Elections 1885-1910. by Henry Pelling (Macmillan 1967)
- Who's Who of British Members of Parliament: Volume I 1832-1885, edited by M. Stenton (The Harvester Press 1976)
- Who's Who of British Members of Parliament, Volume II 1886-1918, edited by M. Stenton and S. Lees (Harvester Press 1978)
- Who's Who of British Members of Parliament, Volume III 1919-1945, edited by M. Stenton and S. Lees (Harvester Press 1979)
- Who's Who of British Members of Parliament, Volume IV 1945-1979, edited by M. Stenton and S. Lees (Harvester Press 1981)
