= Sir Robert Buxton, 3rd Baronet =

English politician

Sir Robert Jacob Buxton, 3rd Baronet (13 March 1829 – 20 January 1888) was an English Conservative Party politician who sat in the House of Commons from 1871 to 1885.

Buxton was the eldest son of Sir John Buxton, 2nd Baronet and his wife Elizabeth Cholmeley, daughter of Sir Montague Cholmeley, 1st Baronet. He was educated at Christ Church, Oxford. He became a lieutenant in the 1st Suffolk Yeoman Cavalry in 1852, and a captain in the 29th Norfolk Rifle Volunteers in 1860. He was a J.P. and a D. L. for Suffolk and Norfolk, and was High Sheriff of Norfolk in 1870.

Buxton stood for parliament unsuccessfully in Bury St Edmunds at the 1859 general election. He was elected as Member of Parliament (MP) for South Norfolk at a by-election in 1871, and held the seat until representation was reduced under the Redistribution of Seats Act 1885.

Buxton married Mary Augusta Harriet Johnstone, only daughter of lieutenant-colonel Johnstone in 1856. He had no male heir and the baronetcy became extinct in 1888. His daughter Maud Isabel Buxton married, in 1901, Gerard James Barnes, who changed his name to Buxton the following year and took the arms of Buxton together with his own. They sold the family estate.

Parliament of the United Kingdom
Preceded by Clare Sewell Read; Edward Howes	Member of Parliament for South Norfolk; 1871–1885; With: Clare Sewell Read 1871–1880; Robert Thornhagh Gurdon 1880–1885	Succeeded by Francis Taylor
Honorary titles
Preceded by Sir Thomas Proctor-Beauchamp Bt	High Sheriff of Norfolk; 1870	Succeeded by Sir Henry Josias Stracey Bt
Baronetage of Great Britain
Preceded by John Buxton	Baronet (of Shadwell Lodge); 1842–1888	Extinct
