= 1920 South Norfolk by-election =

UK parliamentary by-election

- 27 July 1920 (Polling); 9 August 1920 (Declaration)
- Registered: 32,131
- Turnout: 58.5%
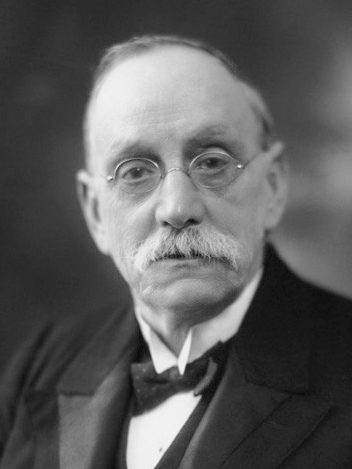

		Nat
Candidate	George Edwards	James Batty	Charles Roberts
Party	Labour	National Liberal	Liberal
Alliance		Coalition
Popular vote	8,594	6,476	3,718
Percentage	45.7%	34.5%	19.8%
Swing	▲10.0%	▼29.8%	New
MP before election
William Cozens-Hardy
National Liberal
Subsequent MP
George Edwards
Labour

The 1920 South Norfolk by-election was a by-election held on 27 July 1920 for the British House of Commons constituency of South Norfolk.

== Background ==
Cozens-Hardy

The by-election was triggered by the succession to the peerage of the serving Coalition Liberal Member of Parliament (MP), William Cozens-Hardy.

=== Electoral history ===
South Norfolk had been a safe Liberal seat since Arthur Soames's victory in the 1898 by-election.

== Candidates ==
=== Coalition Liberal ===
- James Batty, chairman of J. Caley and Co and candidate for Clitheroe in 1918

=== Labour ===
- George Edwards, member of Norfolk County Council, former General Secretary of the National Agricultural Labourers and Rural Workers Union and candidate for this seat in 1918.

==== Withdrawn candidates ====
- W. B. Taylor, farmer, lay preacher and candidate for East Norfolk in 1918

=== Liberal ===
Charles Roberts

- Charles Roberts, former member for Lincoln (1906–1918), Under-Secretary of State for India (1914–1915) and Comptroller of the Household (1915–1916)

== Campaign ==
With the Liberal vote was now divided and a strong Labour Party candidate in 69 year old George Edwards, who was backed by local landowner and Norfolk county councillor, the Earl of Kimberley, the Coalition Liberals appeared potentially vulnerable. Nevertheless as polling day approached it was believed that Batty was favoured to retain the seat ahead of Edwards with Roberts trailing.

Batty recommend that those of his supporters who could not bring themselves to vote for the Coalition to support Edwards instead.

== Result ==
The result was a clear win for Edwards, who picked up around 2,000 votes on a very similar turnout to the general election, and exploited the split in the Liberal vote.

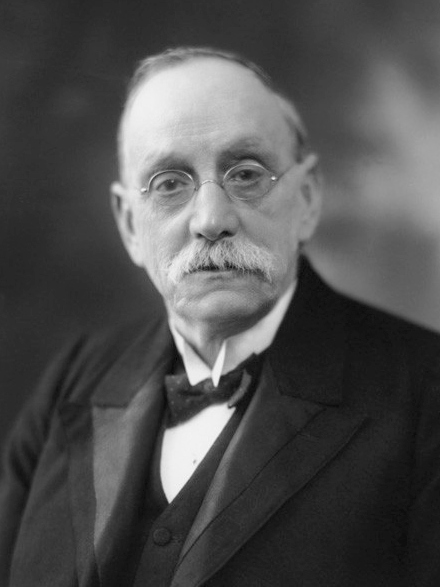
George Edwards

South Norfolk by-election, 1920
Party		Candidate	Votes	%	±%
	Labour	George Edwards	8,594	45.7	+10.0
C	National Liberal	James Batty	6,476	34.5	–29.8
	Liberal	Charles Roberts	3,718	19.8	New
Majority			2,118	11.3	N/A
Turnout			18,788	58.5	+2.7
Registered electors			32,131		–665
	Labour gain from National Liberal		Swing	+19.9	
C indicates candidate endorsed by the coalition government.

== Aftermath ==
Edwards was defeated in the next election, but won the seat again between 1923 and 1924.

== See also ==
- 1898 South Norfolk by-election
- 1955 South Norfolk by-election
- List of United Kingdom by-elections (1918–1931)
- South Norfolk constituency
