= Reginald Baker (film producer) =

British film producer

Reginald Poynton Baker
- Born: Reginald Poynton Baker; 19 July 1896; Leytonstone, England
- Died: 31 January 1985 (aged 88); Sydney, Australia
- Occupations: Chairman and managing director of Ealing Studios
- Spouse(s): Gwendolyn Emily Christabel Webb (m. 1917, died. 1962)
- Children: Capt Peter Baker
- Relatives: Leslie Forsyth Baker (brother), film executive

Reginald Poynton Baker, MC FCA FRSA (19 July 1896 – 31 January 1985) was a British film producer and a major contributor to the development of the British film industry. Along with his younger brother Leslie Forsyth, he played a decisive role in establishing Ealing Studios. He was the father of Conservative MP Peter Baker. Baker died in Australia aged 89.

From 1943 to 1946, Baker was president of the Kinematograph Renter's Society of Great Britain and Ireland (KRS) and from 1950 to 1953, president of the British Film Producers Association (BFPA).

He lived at Loddenden Manor, a 300 acres estate situated in Staplehurst, Kent until 1954.

== Family and early life ==
A soldier, a successful accountant and a movie magnate, Baker was the fourth of the five children of Samuel Henry Baker (1866–1918), a manager of chemical works who lived at 44 James Lane in Leytonstone (Note: The Bakers of Southwell Grove House (later known as Eagles House, a large dwelling-house composed chiefly of bricks) originally descended from James Baker (1745–1822), a Norwich merchant and a shrewd businessman based in London, and his spouse Martha Kerry (1743–1819) of Diss in Norfolk, he was the founder of the Baker fortune, his eldest son and namesake settled in Leytonstone in late 18th.Southwell Grove House stood next to Park House, home of Sea captain Joseph Cotton, director of the East India Company between 1795 and 1823.), Essex and his wife Jane Louisa Baker (1870–1955), the daughter of builder John Cort Christoffer (1834–1913). In 1917, he married Gwendolyn Emily Christabel Webb, the daughter of Arthur Webb, a Draper from Romford, Essex.

Baker was a remote relative of British Army officers Sir Arthur Borton and Brigadier general Neville Travers Borton Pasha CMG (1870–1938), Postmaster general in Egypt and British military governor of Jerusalem (Note: General Allenby was welcomed by Borton and other officials including T. E. Lawrence, Jaffa Gate, 11 December 1917.). Baker was also related to clergyman Neville Arthur Blachley Borton.Other family connections include John Browne, a renowned English landscape engraver.

=== Education ===
He studied at the University of London.

=== World War I ===
At the outbreak of World War I, Baker joined the Essex Yeomanry as a Private. He served on the Western Front with the 17th (Poplar and Stepney Rifles) Battalion, London Regiment, one of the units of the 5th London Brigade, rising through the ranks, he reached Captain.

=== World War II ===
On 17 June 1939, Captain Baker (late of 17th Lond. R) was raised to the rank of Major. On 1 February 1941, Major Baker of the Territorial Army Association Cheveney, Yalding, Kent, (19th Battalion kent Farningham) was awarded the Military Cross and promoted to the Acting rank of Lieutenant colonel.

=== Parliament ===
Baker fought for a seat in the House of Commons in the 1923 general election, he is described as an Independent candidate.

== Formation of Ealing Studios ==
A co-founder of Ealing Studios and a key figure there for some 30 years, 'Major' Reginald Baker became one of Britain's best-known producers.

Following his WWI service, he worked in accountancy negotiating the purchase of Gainsborough Pictures' Islington site (Note: The new Gainsborough Pictures company was renamed Gainsborough Studios.) from Famous Players–Lasky on behalf of Michael Balcon. The studio was small but well equipped with the latest American cameras and lighting equipment and fully staffed. The staff included an ambitious young man, Alfred Hitchcock.

Before moving into film production, Baker was a partner in the firm of Berger, (Note: Joseph Archibald Berger (1899–1948), Berger served as a UNRRA Director Team in the Freising area of Germany from June 1945 until July 1946. See Berger's unpublished manuscript untitled DPs are People Too, July 1946.) Baker and co (Note: The partnership was dissolved by mutual consent, 20 January 1928, it was renamed Baker, Todman and co (1929). The firm merged with Rooke, Lane and co (1966), with Amsdon, Cossart and Wells (1975) to form Baker, Rooke and Amsdons, later renamed Baker Rooke (1982), it became part of Baker Tilly in 1988.), Chartered Accounts and Business Consultants at Southampton Row, London, the firm had connections in the film industry.

When theatre producer Basil Dean and actor Gerald du Maurier founded Associated Talking Pictures (ATP) in 1929, Baker was first to join the management team, quickly followed by textiles heir Stephen Courtauld. Construction costs on the company's new studios at Ealing having doubled by late 1931, he and Courtauld arranged additional finance, ensuring production continued.

All together about 60 pictures were made there over the seven years from 1931 to 1938 such as Perfect Understanding starring Gloria Swanson and Laurence Olivier, other coming stars started their careers there like Madeline Carroll, Margaret Lockwood or director Carol Reed

In 1938, with ATP struggling, he invited (Note: The two men met on an Atlantic liner, Baker share with Balcon his feelings that thing were not working well at Ealing, he offered Balcon to be the studio's new production head. Once back in England, Baker gave orders to have a plate inscribed with the name of Michael Balcon to be put up in the car park although nothing had been signed) his former Gainsborough employer Michael Balcon (at that time, head of MGM-British) to take over the studio from Dean; Balcon subsequently hailed their 20-year partnership as the most successful of his career. An early collaboration was The Ware Case, which helped move Ealing beyond the Gracie Fields and George Formby vehicles that the studio had previously produced.

Ealing had its roster of personnel, directors, writers, and technicians on permanent salary. Their pool of actors and recurring preoccupations made a very recognizable style of film making.

Baker was, like Balcon, a vocal critic of what he saw as the monopolisation of British film exhibition by the Rank Organisation, and in 1944 he negotiated a more favourable co-production and distribution deal for Ealing.

Backed by Rank's ample resources, Ealing entered into its finest period with the national epic Scott of the Antarctic, classic adaptation Nicholas Nickleby, romantic costume drama Saraband for Dead Lovers, the supernatural with Dead of Night. Most often remembered for its comedies such as Hue and Cry, Passport to Pimlico, The Lavender Hill Mob, Kind Hearts and Coronets starring Dennis Price, The Man in the White Suit and the black comedy The Ladykillers.

However, following the withdrawal of Courtauld's financing in 1952 having relocated to Rhodesia the previous year due to failing health, he and Balcon were reluctantly forced to end this arrangement, selling the Ealing lot to the BBC in 1955 and relocated to MGM-British in Boreham Wood.

The last Ealing film appeared in 1959.

== Later life ==
In the aftermath of the imprisonment of his son, Peter, for fraud and forgery, Baker became a major creditor of many of his son's seventeen companies, he sold off some of his assets including his Kentish manor, his son's art collection (Note: Among the valuable items sold at Sotheby's, Rudyard Kipling letter collection (1966).) went up for auction at Sotheby's in 1966–68.

Baker retired to Australia, the home of his two grandchildren, he died in 1985, he was survived by his widow Maxine Poynton Baker née Murray-Jones (1913–2007), a friend of Australian playwright and critic Sydney John Tomholt (1884–1974).

== Other notable family members ==
- Martha Butler alias Baker (1770–1841), wife of bookseller and printer John Williams (Note: The same Williams who intended to take Victorian novelist George Meredith as apprentice but plan fell through.) of 44 Paternoster Row, London.
- Henry Minson Baker (1785–1819), he attended the Royal Military Academy, Woolwich, Lieutenant of the 20th Regiment of Bengal Native Infantry, he participated in the capture of Java in 1811, died at sea on 15 June 1819 on board the EIC ship the Sesostris.
- Grenadier Guards Captain Cecil Douglas Baker (1870–1917), killed in action, a friend of journalist and author Bertram Fletcher Robinson. Captain Oxford University RFC, 1892–1893, The Varsity Match. The Isis Magazine featured Baker as its first ‘idol‘.
- Alice Diana Baker (1881–1969), wife of Herbert William Pride Jones, grandson of Henry Jones, inventor of self-raising flour.
- Monica Gwendoline Baker(1903–1990), wife of British protozoologist Clifford Dobell and stepdaughter of British bacteriologist and pathologist William Bulloch (1868–1941).
- Grenadier Guards Captain Nigel Ernest Westby Baker (1914–1968) (Note: Baker took part in the liberation of the Dutch town of Aalten (29–30 March 1945) and under enemy fire, he led the King's company of the 1st Battalion Grenadier Guards supported by the tanks of No 2 Squadron commanded by Lord Wigram across a small bridge and was seriously wounded, despite sustaining heavy casualties, the Grenadiers captured the Bridge and seized control of the town.), Military Cross, one bar, Baker was married to one of the daughters of Baron Henri Charles van Tuyll van Serooskerken who was Aide-de-camp to his HRH Prince Bernhard of the Netherlands and his spouse Barones Marcelle Wilhelmine de Smeth.
- Joan Clare Baker (1916–1988), wife of British Judge Mervyn Griffith-Jones.
