= George Edwards (British politician) =

British politician

Sir George Edwards OBE MP
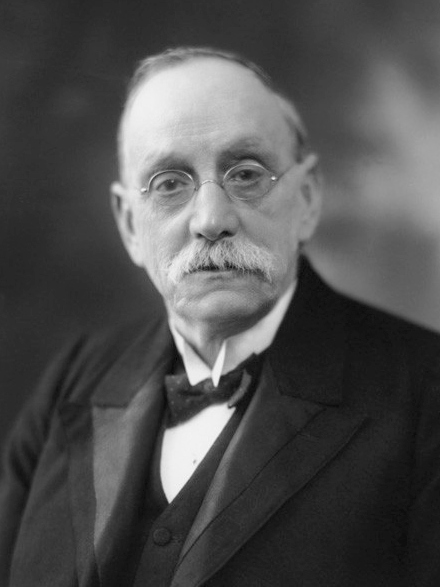
- Edwards in 1922

Member of Parliament for South Norfolk
- In office 6 December 1923 – 9 October 1924
- Preceded by: Thomas William Hay
- Succeeded by: James Christie
- In office 27 July 1920 – 26 October 1922
- Preceded by: William Cozens-Hardy
- Succeeded by: Thomas William Hay

General Secretary of the National Agricultural Labourers and Rural Workers Union
- In office 1906–1913
- Preceded by: Position established
- Succeeded by: Robert Barrie Walker

Personal details
- Born: 5 October 1850 Marsham, Norfolk, England
- Died: 6 December 1933 (aged 83)
- Party: Labour
- Other political affiliations: Liberal

Sir George Edwards OBE (5 October 1850 – 6 December 1933) was a trade unionist and Labour Party politician in the United Kingdom.

== Early life and career ==
Edwards was born in Marsham, Norfolk, the son of a poor ex-soldier who worked as an agricultural labourer. After the Crimean War, when the family's income was threatened by rising prices, they had to enter the workhouse for a year. At the age of 6, Edwards went to work for one shilling (five pence) a week, scaring crows. Because of the need to work he never went to school, and only learnt to read and write in adult life, being taught by his wife.

He joined the Primitive Methodists, and married at the age of 22. In 1889 he became secretary of the Norfolk and Norwich Amalgamated Labour Union, which ceased to exist in 1896.

Ten years later (1906) he founded the National Agricultural Labourers and Rural Workers Union, later known as the National Union of Agricultural and Allied Workers. and became its general secretary. He cycled over 6,000 miles to meetings in the first year, and built its membership to over 3,000.

== Political career ==
In 1906 he was elected to Norfolk County Council, in 1914 he became a magistrate, and in 1918 he became a county alderman. During the war he served on various committees and was given the OBE.

He contested the South Norfolk constituency at the 1918 general election. He won 26% of the votes, losing to the Liberal Party candidate William Cozens-Hardy.

When Cozens-Hardy succeeded to the peerage in 1920 as Baron Cozens-Hardy, Edwards won the resulting by-election in July 1920, with 46% of the votes, with Liberal vote split between pro- and anti-coalition candidates. Edwards was then nearly 70 years of age, one of the oldest ever by-election winners. At the 1922 general election, the Liberals did not field a candidate, and he lost the seat to the Conservative Thomas William Hay.

Edwards was returned to the House of Commons at the 1923 general election, when he beat Hay with a majority of only 861 votes, but lost again in 1924, to the Conservative James Christie. He did not stand for Parliament again.

He was knighted in 1930. His wife died in 1912, and they had no children.

After his wife’s death, her sister Elizabeth Corke moved into his household as his housekeeper. In 1914 she had a son, Noel. When she died in 1923, her son was brought up by Edwards, although he never acknowledged his paternity or adopted him. In 2020, DNA testing undertaken by Noel Edwards’ family confirmed that Noel was Edwards’ biological son.

== See also ==
- 1920 South Norfolk by-election

== Publications ==
- Edwards, George (1922). From Crow-Scaring to Westminster: An Autobiography. London: Labour Publishing. British Library shelfmark: 010855.aa.65. See it in Project Gutenberg.

Trade union offices
Preceded by New position	General Secretary of the National Union of Agricultural Workers; 1906–1913	Succeeded by Robert Barrie Walker
Parliament of the United Kingdom
Preceded by William Cozens-Hardy	Member of Parliament for South Norfolk; 1920–1922	Succeeded by Thomas William Hay
Preceded by Thomas William Hay	Member of Parliament for South Norfolk; 1923–1924	Succeeded by James Christie
