= William Cozens-Hardy, 2nd Baron Cozens-Hardy =

British politician (1869–1924)

William Cozens-Hardy

William Hepburn Cozens-Hardy, 2nd Baron Cozens-Hardy, KC (25 March 1869 – 25 May 1924) was a British Liberal politician and lawyer.

== Family ==
Cozens-Hardy was the eldest son of Herbert Cozens-Hardy, 1st Baron Cozens-Hardy and Maria Hepburn. Herbert Cozens-Hardy was a lawyer and Liberal Member of Parliament for North Norfolk from 1885 to 1899. He was then appointed a judge and eventually became Master of the Rolls. The Barony was created in 1914 and William succeeded as 2nd Baron on the death of his father in 1920. In 1895, he married Gertrude Lilian the eldest daughter of Colonel Sir William Everett KCMG. They had one daughter.

== Education ==
William was educated at University College School in Hampstead where he was leader of the school debating society and Captain of School. He then went up to New College, Oxford where he took his degree with classical honours.

== Career ==
Like his father, William went into the law. He was called to the Bar at Lincoln's Inn in 1893 and took silk in 1912. He was made a Bencher of Lincoln's Inn in 1916. He also sat as a Justice of the Peace in Norfolk. In 1913 he was offered the post of Chief Justice of Bengal but refused for private reasons. Throughout the four years of the First World War, he was a Commander in the Royal Naval Volunteer Reserve, serving on the Admiralty War Staff, attached to the Intelligence Department. He was awarded the Italian Order of St Maurice and St Lazarus. He was knighted in 1912.

== Politics ==
Cozens-Hardy also followed his father in his political affiliation. While at Oxford University he was involved in Liberal politics, being a member of the Russell Club and he was President of the Union. He was elected as Liberal MP for South Norfolk at the 1918 general election. Although he stood as a Coalition Liberal at that election he did not receive the Coalition coupon. One source indicates this was because he was late entering the field. He then chose to take the Coalition whip in Parliament. William's political stance in the election has been described as a "...conventional Coalition programme: support for Lloyd George and harsh peace with Germany, jobs and houses for the returning soldiers all topped off with expressions of concern about agriculture and repeated references to his own Norfolk roots." When William succeeded his father to the peerage he had to stand down from the House of Commons and in the by-election of 27 July 1920 which followed, his seat was won by George Edwards, the Labour candidate with the Liberal vote split between Lloyd George Coalition Liberal and Asquithian Independent Liberal candidates.

== Death ==
Cozens-Hardy was a pioneer of motoring. In the early days of his marriage he and his wife would undertake long and hazardous trips around continental Europe. This love of cars was the cause of his death as he was killed in a motor accident at Bucchof, Starnberg in Bavaria on 25 May 1924 aged 55. As he had no male heir, the title passed to his younger brother, Edward Herbert Cozens-Hardy (1873–1956).

== Arms ==
Coat of arms of William Cozens-Hardy, 2nd Baron Cozens-Hardy
Crest 1st a dexter arm embowed holding in the hand an eagle's head erased fesswise Proper (Hardy); 2nd a lion rampant Or vulned at the shoulder Proper and gorged with a ducal coronet Azure. Escutcheon Quarterly: 1st & 4th per chevron Argent and Or in chief two fire balls Sable fired Proper (Hardy); 2nd & 3rd Azure a lion rampant Or gorged with a ducal coronet of the field in chief two barrulets of the second (Cozens). Supporters Dexter an eagle Argent wings endorsed Gules holding in the beak a white rose slipped and leaved Proper, sinister a winged lion queue fourchée Argent wings endorsed Gules. Motto Fear One. Badge Upon a field Azure diaper of mascles and fleurs-de-lis Or an estoc (or thrusting sword) the blade enfiled with a baron's coronet Proper the quillons terminating in fleurs-de-lis Or the hilt also Proper and the pomel Or thereon a rose Argent, with mottoes "Fear One" and "Je Sers".

Parliament of the United Kingdom
Preceded by Arthur Soames	Member of Parliament for South Norfolk; 1918–1920	Succeeded by George Edwards
Peerage of the United Kingdom
Preceded by Herbert Cozens-Hardy	Baron Cozens-Hardy; 1920–1924	Succeeded by Edward Cozens-Hardy
