= Arthur Soames (politician) =

British politician

Arthur Soames

Arthur Wellesley Soames (30 November 1852 – 2 November 1934) was a British Liberal politician and architect.

== Family and education ==
Soames was born in Brighton, the son of William Aldwin Soames. He was educated at Brighton College, the public school which his father had founded in 1845, and in 1871 he went up to Trinity College, Cambridge where he obtained his BA in 1877 and MA in 1881. In 1876 he married Eveline, the daughter of T. Horsman Coles from Ore in East Sussex. They had three sons and two daughters. Of the three sons, two, Gilbert and Maurice, were killed during the First World War.

== Career ==
Soames studied architecture under Sir Arthur Blomfield who was an Associate of the Royal Academy. He then set up his own architectural practice between 1882 and 1898.

== Politics ==
Soames was a Liberal in the Radical tradition. He was Chairman of the East Marylebone Liberal and Radical Association. He was adopted as the Radical candidate for Ipswich at the 1892 general election and fought the seat, without success, in 1895. However he got his opportunity to enter Parliament at a by-election in the constituency of South Norfolk held on 12 May 1898. The by-election was occasioned by the resignation on grounds of ill-health of the sitting Liberal Unionist (formerly Liberal) MP, Francis Taylor. Standing as a Radical, Soames gained 4,625 votes. His Unionist opponent, Sancroft Holmes received 3,295 giving a very healthy Liberal majority of 1,330.

Soames decided not to contest his seat again at the 1918 general election, by that time aged 66 years.

Parliament of the United Kingdom
| Preceded by Francis Taylor | Member of Parliament for South Norfolk; 1898 – 1918 | Succeeded by Hon. William Cozens-Hardy |
