= James Christie (British politician) =

British politician (1873–1958)

James Archibald Christie (1873 – 16 October 1958) was a Conservative Party politician in the United Kingdom. He was member of parliament (MP) for South Norfolk from 1924 until he retired from the House of Commons at the 1945 general election.

Parliament of the United Kingdom
Preceded by George Edwards	Member of Parliament for South Norfolk; 1924–1945	Succeeded by Christopher Mayhew
