= 1898 South Norfolk by-election =

UK parliamentary by-election

The 1898 South Norfolk by-election was a by-election held on 12 May 1898 for the British House of Commons constituency of South Norfolk.

The election was triggered by the resignation on grounds of ill-health of the sitting Liberal Unionist Party former Liberal Member of Parliament (MP), Francis Taylor.

The result of the election was a clear win for Arthur Wellesley Soames the Liberal candidate over his Unionist opponent. Soames was a Liberal in the Radical tradition and he was described as a Radical during the election.

== Result ==
Soames

South Norfolk by-election, 1898
Party	Candidate	Votes	%	±%
Liberal	Arthur Wellesley Soames	4,625	58.4	+13.8
Conservative	Sancroft Holmes	3,295	41.6	−13.8
Majority		1,330	16.8	N/A
Turnout		7,920	82.3	+3.8
Liberal hold		Swing		
