= Ministry of Agriculture (Spain) =

Government ministry of Spain

Ministry of Agriculture, Fisheries and Food
- Ministerio de Agricultura, Pesca y Alimentación
- Logotype

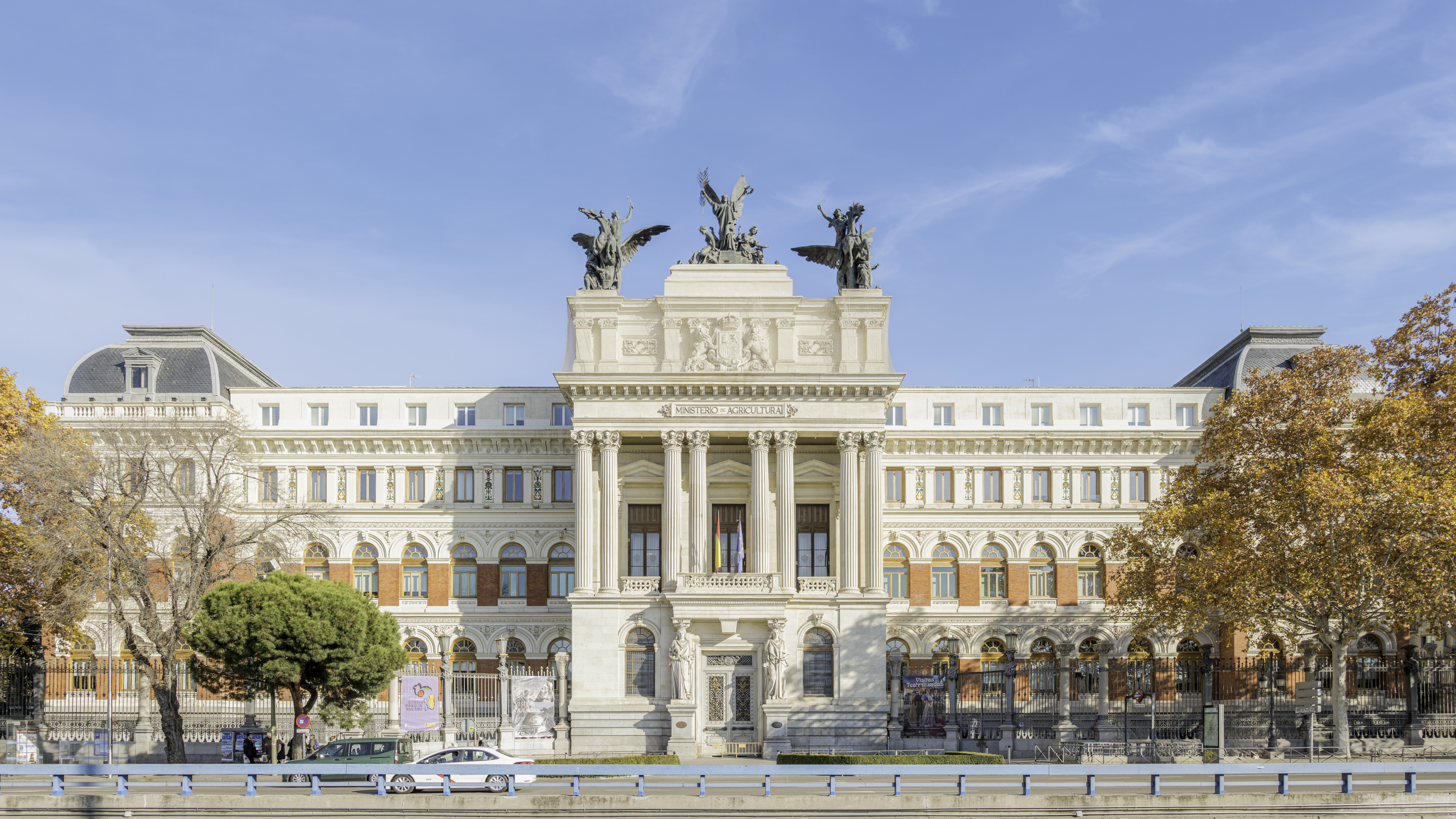
- Palacio de Fomento, Ministry headquarters

Agency overview
- Formed: 12 June 1933; 93 years ago (as Ministry of Agriculture)
- Preceding agency: Ministry of Agriculture, Industry and Trade (1928–1933)
- Type: Ministry
- Jurisdiction: Government of Spain
- Headquarters: Palacio de Fomento; Madrid, Spain; 40°24′32″N 03°41′25″W
- Employees: 8,071 (2018)
- Annual budget: €8.4 billion, 2026
- Minister responsible: Luis Planas, Minister
- Agency executives: Begoña García Bernal, Secretary of State for Agriculture and Food; Ana Rodríguez Castaño, Secretary-General for Agriculture and Food; María Isabel Artime García, Secretary-General for Fisheries; Ernesto Abati García-Manso, Under-Secretary
- Child agencies: Spanish Agricultural Guarantee Fund; Agency for Food Information and Control
- Website: www.mapa.gob.es/es/

The Ministry of Agriculture, Fisheries and Food (Spanish: Ministerio de Agricultura, Pesca y Alimentación, MAPA) is the department of the Government of Spain responsible for designing and implementing the government policy on agricultural, livestock and fishery resources, food industry and safety and rural development. The Ministry is responsible for assigning Veterinary Surgeons to carry out checks in regard to the issuing of REGA Licences (Registro de Explotación) a requirement for the ownership of horses on Spanish property and small holdings.

Specifically, it corresponds to the MAPA the preparation of State legislation on agriculture, fisheries and food; the proposal and carrying out of the general guidelines of the Government on agricultural, fisheries and food policies; the representation of Spain in the international organizations corresponding to these matters; as well as the coordination of actions, cooperation and agreement in the design and application of all policies that affect the scope of competences of the autonomous communities and the other public administrations, encouraging their participation through the cooperation bodies and instruments adequate.

The Ministry of Agriculture, Fisheries and Food is headed by the Minister of Agriculture, Fisheries and Food, a member of the Council of Ministers appointed by the Monarch on the advice of the Prime Minister. The current minister is Mr. Luis Planas since June 2018.

== History ==
=== Early period ===
From the beginning of the 18th century, when the first modern ministries were established, the powers over everything related to the countryside were vested in the Ministry of the Interior (then called "Secretariat of State and of the Dispatch of General Development of the Realm")—although they overlapped with some that were also assigned to the Ministry of Finance or independent agencies such us the Council of the Mesta (Spanish: Consejo de la Mesta) or the Forest Conservancy (Spanish: Conservaduría de Montes). The Interior Ministry acted as a catch-all agency where many areas of government were managed—including the promotion of agriculture, plant nurseries and breeding cattle, gardening and conservation of mountains and trees, as well as hunting and fishing— but most of its powers were gradually transferred to other agencies as government action became more specialized.

Thus, in the middle of the 19th century, the Ministry of Development (then called "Ministry of Trade, Public Instruction and Works") was created, which grouped together functions related to public education and those related to charity, public works and the promotion of commerce. Although it was not initially planned that this new agency would take on agricultural affairs, a few weeks later it was decided to do so, removing his charitable powers, which remained in the Interior Ministry.

The agriculture responsibilities remained in the Ministry of Development for nearly one hundred years, always with the organic level of directorate-general. As happened with the Ministry of the Interior, development gave rise to new departments, such as Public Instruction and Fine Arts (1900), Labour (1920) or National Economy (1928).

Specifically, in this last split, the Ministry of National Economy —today the Ministry of Industry and Tourism— assumed the Directorate-General for Agriculture, with the agricultural chambers, the Agronomic Council and the association of livestock farmers and the services of Hygiene and Livestock Health.

This new department evolved rapidly, and shortly thereafter, by Decree of 16 December 1931 of the President of the Republic, Niceto Alcalá Zamora, it was renamed "Ministry of Agriculture, Industry and Trade" and grouped together the directorates-general of Agriculture, Industry and Trade that it already had as well as those relating to mines, forestry, fishing and livestock of the Ministry of Development.

=== The importance of agriculture: specific ministry ===
The importance of the economic area and the important role played by the primary sector in the Spanish economy at the beginning of the 20th century—the population dedicated to agriculture accounted for nearly 50% of the total active population— was evident from the beginning, since as early as 1900 the term "Agriculture" began to appear in the names of some government departments such as the ministries of Development or Industry.

The decisive point was reached in 1933. In June, under the premiership of Manuel Azaña, the Ministry of Agriculture, Industry and Trade was divided into two; on the one hand, the powers over industry and trade were kept together, and on the other, for the first time, a department was created exclusively dedicated to agricultural issues. The separation became final, except in the period from 25 September 1935 to 19 February 1936, when it was briefly merged again the responsibilities of industry and trade.

==== Agrarian reforms of 1932 and 1935 ====
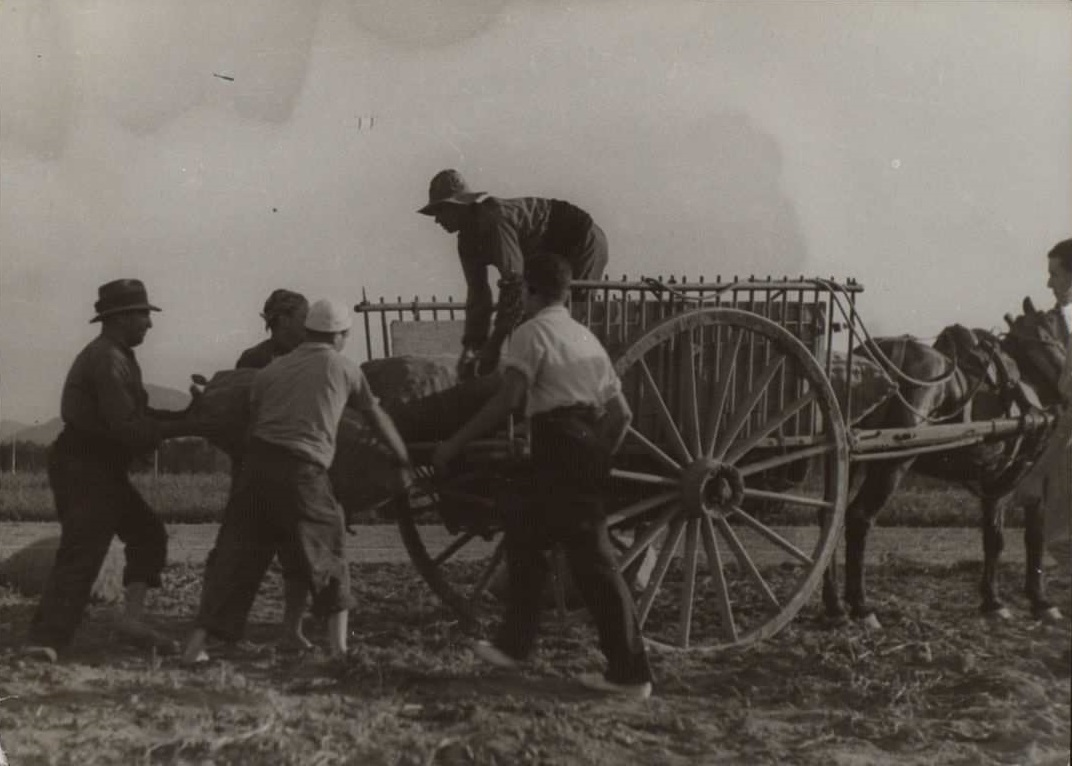
Farmers harvesting potatoes in the late 1930s

During this Republican period, the new department had to follow the work of its predecessor and find a solution to what was considered the main problem in the rural world: latifundism. This problem was mainly in southern Spain, where there were large landowners who monopolized land ownership, such as President Alcalá-Zamora, who opposed some proposals.

A year before the foundation of the Ministry, the Cortes had approved the Agrarian Reform Act, promoted by the minister Marcelino Domingo. This law established a policy of expropriations with compensation for the owners of large estates—except for the Grandees of Spain, which were punished for La Sanjurjada with expropriations without compensation—with the aim of converting the land into smallholdings that could be distributed among the day labourers and thus improve both the conditions of the workers and the productivity of the land. It was done through two mechanisms: peasants settled by decrees of intensification of crops (temporary occupation) and peasants settled by the Agrarian Reform Act (expropriation of lands to the Grandees). After the 1933 general election, only the first of these was used.

Likewise, to coordinate the implementation of the republican agrarian policy, the Agrarian Reform Institute (IRA) was created. The Executive Council of this new agency was made up of representatives from both the progressive and conservative sectors and, in practice, acted as an element of moderation towards those who sought a more radical application of agrarian policy. Although this could be blamed on the conservatives who, on many occasions, tried—unsuccessfully due to the balance of forces—to overturn proposals that sought to intensify crops or expropriate land, the reality is that the main problem was the complexity of the norm and respect for the procedure, which required that each case be treated individually. Knowing this, the IRA was flooded with appeals from the landowners, which ended up greatly delaying their work. The peasants' discontent with this law was evident, mainly due to the false expectations that the political class had given them. These expectations were finally dashed by the new Agrarian Reform Act of 1935, which, among other things, eliminated expropriation without compensation, allowed landowners to participate in the valuation of their lands and reduced the IRA's budget.

==== Republican policy reversal and colonization ====
If the agrarian policy was already damaged, the civil war and the victory of the rebel side meant its total failure. The rebel government immediately created the Agricultural Recovery Service which, together with the National Service for Economic and Social Land Reform, had as its main objectives the reversal of the measures of the previous Republican policy, starting with the suppression of the Agrarian Reform Institute (IRA) and the return of expropriated lands.

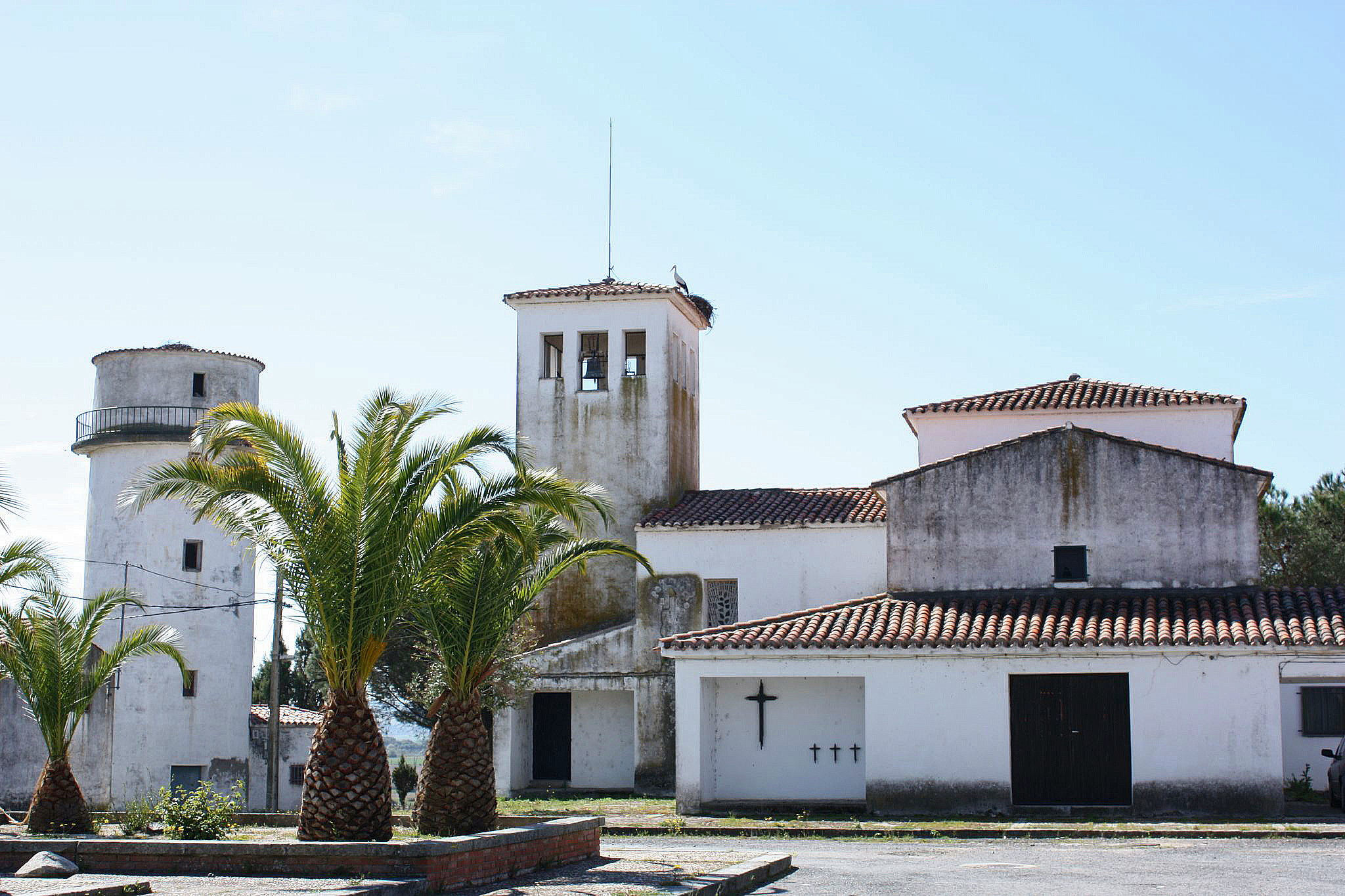
Church of Valderrosas, a colonization town founded between the 1950s and 1960s by the INC.

At the organic level, the dictatorship did not make any relevant changes within the scope of the Ministry and it was initially structured through the Undersecretariat and the national services (or directorates-general) of Agriculture, of Livestock, of Forestry, Hunting and River Fishing and of Economic and Social Land Reform. Precisely, from this last service the National Institute for Colonization (INC) was created in October 1939.

The INC was responsible for implementing, in a similar way to the IRA and with the same little success, the measures established in the Law on the Basis for the Colonization of Large Areas of 1939. This law established a new agricultural policy based on the increase in agricultural production thanks to the expansion of irrigation, the cultivation of areas not previously exploited for agriculture and, thanks to the previous measures, the settlement of new "settlers". From then on, this organization devoted itself to buying large tracts of land to create new towns where these settlers could settle and prosper. From 1945 onwards, legal adjustments were made to avoid the paralysis of the Institute as a consequence of the lack of available productive land and the high cost that the organization would have to carry out its projects on the lands that the owners ceded to it, which were mostly unproductive.

In addition, the 1939 law provided for the possibility of creating "Colonization Societies" as a private instrument that, together with the State, would carry out these projects. However, these private societies were not created because the private sector was not interested in such a costly undertaking, so the State had to assume the entire cost of the reform.

In the 1950s, thanks to the support of the United States, the regime began an opening phase that favoured the economic climate and new measures were introduced by minister Rafael Cavestany, aimed at economic stimulation, the modernisation of the rural world and the reduction of state control and interventionism established at the beginning of the dictatorship.

During the rest of this authoritarian period, the Ministry achieved notable stability, with small reforms in 1962, 1968 and 1971 that distributed powers and created some directorates-general. The most relevant thing about this period is the creation of several relevant organizations. Firstly, in 1968 the Fund for the Management and Regulation of Agricultural Productions and Prices (FORPPA) and the National Cereal Service (SNC) —the latter replaced the National Wheat Service (1937) and whlater it would become the National Service of Agrarian Products (SENPA, 1971)—were founded. Secondly, in 1971, in addition to the transformation of the SNC, the Institute for Nature Conservation (ICONA), the National Institute for Agrarian Reform and Development (IRYDA) and the National Institute for Agrarian Research (INIA) were created.

=== Democracy: food and environment ===
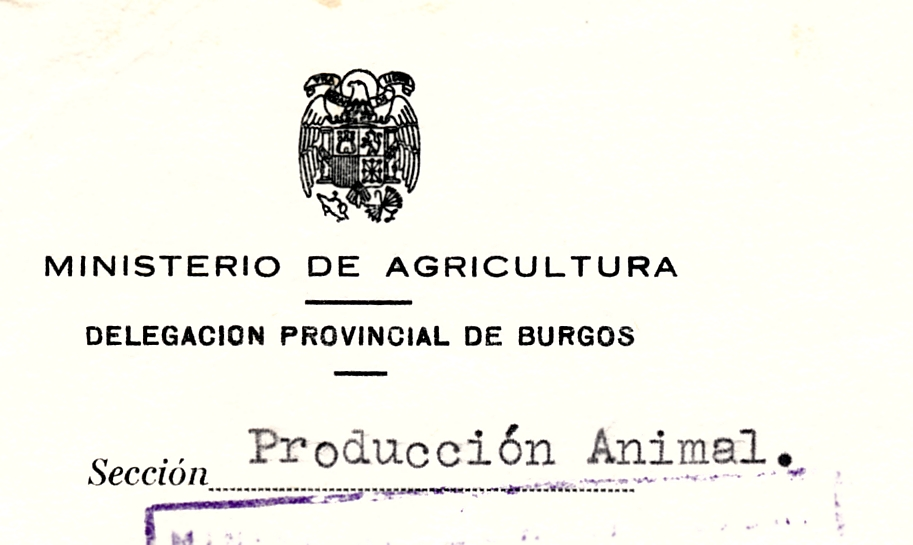
Detail of the letterhead of the Ministry of Agriculture in 1978

Once the 1978 Constitution was approved, changes were made to the Department of Agriculture. Following the transfer of powers in 1980, the Ministry of Agriculture assumed the powers over commercial fishing that until then had been held by the Ministry of Transport and Communications, also assuming, among other agencies, the Undersecretariat of Fisheries (which a year later would be renamed the General Secretariat of Fisheries) and the Spanish Institute of Oceanography (Spanish: Instituto Español de Oceanografía, IEO). For this reason, in mid-1981 the department was renamed "Ministry of Agriculture and Fisheries".

The changes did not stop there; that same year, the Congress of Deputies urged the Government to create, before the end of the year, a Ministry of Agriculture, Fisheries and Food to "facilitate a unitary administrative treatment of the production, transformation and distribution of food products". In compliance with this mandate, another redistribution of powers was carried out in December 1981, which transferred to the Ministry the powers in food matters exercised by the Ministries of Industry and Energy and Economy and Trade.

Between 1971 and 1981, the territorial action of the Department of Agriculture was carried out through Regional Agrarian Divisions.

In the following years, due to the creation of the autonomous communities and the decentralisation of powers over the areas of action of the ministry and the new European policies, its autonomous agencies will undergo important changes, most being suppressed and others transformed. Thus, in 1985, six organizations were eliminated, namely: the National Institute for Denominations of Origin, the Institute for Agrarian, Fisheries and Food Studies, the Pest Defense and Phytopathological Inspection Service, the Livestock Development Agency, the Board for the Promotion of Maritime-Fisheries Vocational Training, and the Grain Deposits Service.

Exceptionally, in 1987 the Olive Oil Agency was created and, in 1991, the National Institute for Seeds and Nursery Plants, the Agricultural Extension Service and the National Tobacco Agency were abolished.

In 1995, two other major reforms took place. The first merged IRYDA and INCONA to create the National Parks Autonomous Agency (OAPN). The Institute for the Promotion of Agricultural Associations (IFA) was also abolished and its functions being shared among the ministry's administrative agencies. The second merged FORPPA and SENPA to form the Spanish Agricultural Guarantee Fund (FEGA).

The 2000s began with the establishment of a main structure that will remain stable to this day, around the traditional Undersecretariat—charged with running the department on a day-to-day basis—and two general secretariats (one for Agriculture and Food and the other for Fisheries).

During the premiership of José Luis Rodríguez Zapatero, in 2008, the Ministry of Environment was merged into the Ministry of Agriculture, which was renamed "Ministry of Environment and Rural and Marine Affairs". Nature conservation affairs thus returned to this portfolio after 20 years independently. Some agrarian associations, such as the Young Farmers' Agricultural Association (Asaja), rejected the rebranding of the Agriculture Ministry, considering that it was "to ignore two of the main challenges facing society today: agriculture and food" as well as "downplay the importance of the agricultural sector".

With a new government in power for the 2011–2015 legislative period, the department retained its environmental powers through the Secretary of State for Environment and, roughly speaking, recovered the rest of the structure established in 2000. In this new stage, which will last almost seven years, the department was first called the "Ministry of Agriculture, Food and Environment" and then the "Ministry of Agriculture and Fisheries, Food and Environment". Following the 2018 vote of no confidence in the government of Mariano Rajoy and the formation of the first government of Pedro Sánchez, the Ministry of the Environment was re-established as "Ministry for the Ecological Transition" and this department recovered the traditional name of "Ministry of Agriculture, Fisheries and Food".

==== Food Chain Act: fair prices ====
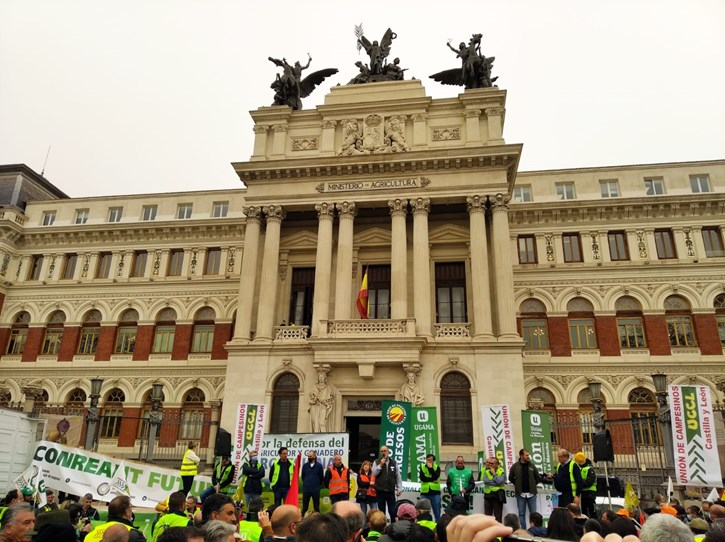
A demonstration by the Union of Farmers and Ranchers in front of the Ministry's headquarters demanding fair prices, 2022

When Miguel Arias Cañete was minister, the Government promoted two laws approved in the summer of 2013. The first one had the objective of promoting cooperativism in the agro-food industry to group together the "first links that make up the food chain", thus promoting their "competitiveness and contributing to the valorisation of their productions" and achieving an "improvement in the income of agricultural producers". As for the second, among its many aims —from introducing new technologies in the sector to improving information and transparency—the objective of trying to reduce the imbalance between the different operators in the value chain stood out. To monitor and ensure compliance with the purposes of this law, in 2014 the Olive Oil Agency extended its powers to other markets outside of olive oil and it was renamed as the Food Information and Control Agency (AICA).

The ambitious goal of achieving a balance in the food chain was not achieved and the situation was aggravated by the context of the COVID-19 pandemic, which generated unrest in the rural world due to the inability to cover expenses while the last actors in the chain had prices that allowed them large profits. Following a series of protests between 2020 and 2021, minister Luis Planas promoted a series of reforms to the Food Chain Act that made it mandatory to set a price that covered producers' expenses, greater publicity for those sanctioned for non-compliance, and the creation of a registry of food contracts, while strengthening the AICA, which saw its budget increase by almost 32%, as well as its control and sanction powers.

In 2020, the ministry lost its powers on forestry in favour of the environmental ministry. At the end of 2023, a Secretariat of State for Agriculture and Food was created for the first time.

== Organization ==
Organizational chart of the Spanish Ministry of Agriculture, July 2024

The minister of agriculture is a member of the Spanish Council of Ministers that leads the Ministry of Agriculture, Fisheries and Food. The minister establishes the government policy on these areas and appoints the government officials responsible for implementing it.

To exercise its powers, the minister is assisted by the secretary of state for agriculture and food—who develops the rural development policies—, two secretaries-general, with the rank of under-secretaries, one for agrarian resources and food security and another for fisheries—who are responsible for designing government policies in their respective areas—and the Ministry's under-secretary, who runs the department on a day-to-day basis.

As of 2026, this is the organization of the Ministry:

Ministry Organization (2026)
| Minister | Cabinet (Chief of Staff) |
| Secretary of State for Agriculture and Food | Directorate-General for Rural Development, Innovation and Agrifood Training |
| Secretary of State for Agriculture and Food | State Enterprise for Agricultural Infrastructures (SEISA) |
| Secretary General for Agrarian Resources and Food Security | Directorate-General for Agricultural Production and Markets |
| Secretary General for Agrarian Resources and Food Security | Directorate-General for Agri-Food Production Health and Animal Welfare |
| Secretary General for Agrarian Resources and Food Security | Directorate-General for Food |
| Secretary General for Agrarian Resources and Food Security | Deputy Directorate-General for Support and Coordination |
| Secretary General for Agrarian Resources and Food Security | Deputy Directorate-General for Agricultural Policy Planning |
| Secretary General for Agrarian Resources and Food Security | Spanish Agricultural Guarantee Fund (FEGA) |
| Secretary General for Agrarian Resources and Food Security | Food Information and Control Agency (AICA) |
| Secretary General for Agrarian Resources and Food Security | Junta Nacional de Homologación de Trofeos de Caza (JNHTC) |
| Secretary General for Fisheries | Directorate-General for Sustainable Fisheries |
| Secretary General for Fisheries | Directorate-General for Fisheries Management and Aquaculture |
| Secretary General for Fisheries | Deputy Directorate-General for Coordination and Management |
| Secretary General for Fisheries | Deputy Directorate-General for Legal Affairs and International Fisheries Governance |
| Under-Secretary | Technical General Secretariat |
| Under-Secretary | Directorate-General for Services and Inspection |
| Under-Secretary | Deputy Directorate-General for Analysis, Coordination and Statistics |
| Under-Secretary | Deputy Directorate-General for International Relations and European Affairs |
| Under-Secretary | National Agency for Agricultural Insurance (ENESA) |

== Headquarters ==
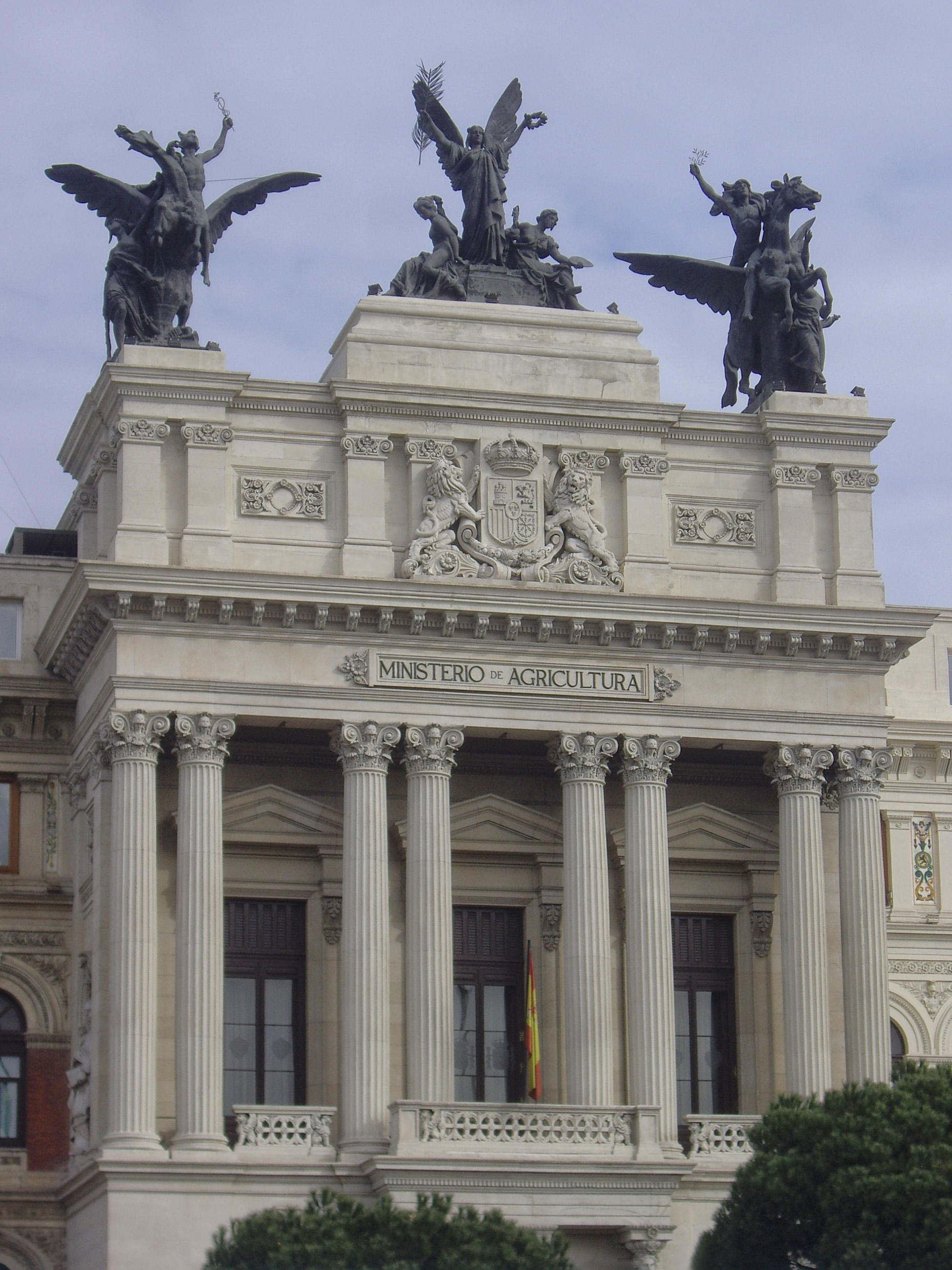
Main facade's detail

The main headquarters of the Ministry of Agriculture, Fisheries and Food is located in the Palacio de Fomento, a 19th-century building designed by Ricardo Velázquez Bosco. Before housing this department, it housed both the Ministry of Development and the Ministry of Public Instruction and Fine Arts. This property and its entire estate was declared a Cultural Heritage Site in 1989.

In addition to this historic headquarters, the department has other locations. Two stand out: the Spanish Agricultural Guarantee Fund is headquartered in the Palace of the Duke of Veragua, a mid-19th-century building designed by Matías Laviña Blasco. The General Secretariat for Fisheries is located in a mid-20th-century building designed by Miguel Fisac at 111 Velázquez Street in Madrid, which was originally intended to house the Spanish National Research Council.

== Budget ==
In millions of euros (€)
1. Agricultural grants and benefits 6,110.3 (72.6%)
2. Rural development 1,939.6 (23.1%)
3. Agricultural, fisheries and food policies 226.2 (2.69%)
4. Central services 135.9 (1.62%)

For fiscal year 2026, the Ministry of Agriculture, Fisheries and Food has a consolidated budget of €8.41 billion. Of this amount, €739 million are directly managed by the ministry's central services while €7.67 billion are managed by its agencies.

The budget programs can be divided into four main areas:

1. Central Services (Program 411M), which finances the ministry's general administration services.
2. Agricultural, fisheries and food policies (412C, 412D, 413A, 415A & 415B), which cover active policies aimed at improving competitiveness, quality and sustainability in the agricultural, fisheries and agri-food sectors.
3. Agricultural grants and benefits (412M & 416A), which include CAP direct aid and market regulation in Spain, as well as agricultural and fisheries insurance schemes.
4. Rural development (414A & 414B), which finance policies related to rural development, infrastructure and irrigation.

In addition, Programme 000X (“Internal Transfers and Disbursements”) is excluded from the analysis, as it consists of transfers between public sector entities and would otherwise lead to double counting and distort the overall budget.

=== Audit ===
The Ministry's accounts, as well as those of its agencies, are internally audited by the Office of the Comptroller General of the State (IGAE), through a Delegated Comptroller's Office within the Department itself. Externally, the Court of Auditors is responsible for auditing expenditures. Likewise, the Congress of Deputies Committee on Agriculture, Fisheries and Food and the Senate Committee on Agriculture, Livestock and Food exercise political control over the accounts.
