= Eastern Anatolia Development Programme =

The Eastern Anatolia Development Programme was a development programme implemented in 2004-2005 and financed by the European Structural Funds (5 000 000 €) for the east of Turkey.
