= AICA =

AICA may refer to:

- Australian Indigenous Communications Association
- Food Information and Control Agency, a Spanish government agency, AICA by its name in Spanish
- International Association of Art Critics
- Anterior inferior cerebellar artery, a major blood supply to the cerebellum
- American Committee for the Independence of Armenia, now known as Armenian National Committee of America
- American Innovation and Competitiveness Act, U.S. legislation supporting scientific initiatives passed in 2017
- Yamaha AICA, the sound processor used in the Sega Dreamcast console
