= European Agricultural Guarantee Fund =

The European Agricultural Guarantee Fund (EAGF) consumes a large part of the general budget of the European Union. It finances direct payments to farmers under the Common Agricultural Policy (CAP), as well as measures to regulate the common markets such as intervention and export refunds under both the CAP and the Common Fisheries Policy (CFP).

The EAGF and the European Agricultural Fund for Rural Development (EAFRD), which finances the rural development programmes of the Member States, were set up on 1 January 2007 following Council Regulation (EC) No 1290/2005 of 21 June 2005 on the financing of the CAP. They both (along with the earlier established Financial Instrument for Fisheries Guidance) replaced the European Agricultural Guidance and Guarantee Fund (EAGGF), which had been set up by Regulation No 25 of 1962 on the financing of the CAP (as amended by Regulation (EEC) No 728/70.

The fund is administered by the European Commission and the Member States, the Fund Committee consisting of representatives of the Member States and of the commission.

== See also ==
- European Structural and Investment Funds
- Spanish Agricultural Guarantee Fund

== Sources ==
- Directorate-General Agriculture
- Regional Policy - Inforegio
