= List of agriculture ministers of Spain =

This is a list of the officeholders of the Ministry of Agriculture since 1933, when the government department was established. Before 1933 the ministers with responsibilities in agriculture were the Minister of Industry (1928–1933), the Minister of Development (1847–1928) and the Minister of the Interior (before 1847).

Since then, this ministry has been responsible not only for agricultural matters, but also for fishing, food, rural development and, occasionally, the environment.

Name	Term		Duration	Party	Government		Ref.
Marcelino Domingo (Note: Minister of Agriculture, Industry and Trade from December 1931 to June 1933 (what today is known as Minister of Industry) and as Minister of Agriculture from June to September 1933.) (Note: José Salmerón García, Director-General for Forestry, Fishing and Hunting, served as acting minister from May 12 to May 17, 1932 and from July 15 to July 19, 1932. Also, Darío Marcos Cano, Under-Secretary, served as such from May 26 to May 31, 1933.) (1884–1939)	16 December 1931	12 September 1933	1 year, 270 days	Radical Socialist Republican	Manuel Azaña	Niceto Alcalá-Zamora (1931–1936)	
Ramón Feced (1894–1959)	12 September 1933	8 October 1933	26 days	Radical Socialist Republican	Alejandro Lerroux	Niceto Alcalá-Zamora (1931–1936)	
Cirilo del Río Rodríguez (Note: During his absences, Vicente Iranzo, Minister of Industry and Trade (May 18 to May 26, 1934) and Rafael Guerra del Río, Minister of Public Works (August 7 to August 15, 1934) served as acting ministers.) (1892–1957)	8 October 1933	4 October 1934	361 days	Progressive Republican	Diego Martínez Barrio	Niceto Alcalá-Zamora (1931–1936)	
Cirilo del Río Rodríguez (1892–1957)	8 October 1933	4 October 1934	361 days	Progressive Republican	Alejandro Lerroux	Niceto Alcalá-Zamora (1931–1936)	
Cirilo del Río Rodríguez (1892–1957)	8 October 1933	4 October 1934	361 days	Progressive Republican	Ricardo Samper	Niceto Alcalá-Zamora (1931–1936)	
Manuel Giménez Fernández (Note: During his absences, Miguel Gortari Errea, Under-Secretary, served as acting minister.) (1896–1968)	4 October 1934	3 April 1935	181 days	CEDA	Alejandro Lerroux	Niceto Alcalá-Zamora (1931–1936)	
Juan José Benayas (1899–1989)	3 April 1935	6 May 1935	33 days	Progressive Republican	Alejandro Lerroux	Niceto Alcalá-Zamora (1931–1936)	
Nicasio Velayos Velayos (1877–1951)	6 May 1935	25 September 1935	142 days	Agrarian	Alejandro Lerroux	Niceto Alcalá-Zamora (1931–1936)	
Agricultural affairs re-integrated into the Ministry of Agriculture, Industry and Trade						Niceto Alcalá-Zamora (1931–1936)	
Mariano Ruiz-Funes (Note: Mariano Ruiz-Funes, Minister of Agriculture, served as Acting Minister of Industry and Trade from February 21 to March 21, 1936.) (1889–1953)	19 February 1936	19 July 1936	151 days	Republican Left	Manuel Azaña	Niceto Alcalá-Zamora (1931–1936)	
Mariano Ruiz-Funes (1889–1953)	19 February 1936	19 July 1936	151 days	Republican Left	Augusto Barcia Trelles (Note: Acting prime minister from 10 to 13 May 1936)	Manuel Azaña (1936–1939)	
Mariano Ruiz-Funes (1889–1953)	19 February 1936	19 July 1936	151 days	Republican Left	Santiago Casares Quiroga	Manuel Azaña (1936–1939)	
Ramón Feced (1894–1959)	19 July 1936	19 July 1936	0 days	Radical Socialist Republican	Diego Martínez Barrio	Manuel Azaña (1936–1939)	
Start of the Spanish Civil War						Manuel Azaña (1936–1939)	
Republican side						Manuel Azaña (1936–1939)	
Mariano Ruiz-Funes (Note: During his absences, Manuel Álvarez Ugena, Director-General for Agriculture, Forestry and Livestock (July 27 to August 1, 1936), José Giral, Minister of the Navy (August 1 to August 7, 1936 and from Agusut 21 to September 1, 1936) and Leonardo Martín Echevarría, Under-Secretary, served as acting ministers.) (1889–1953)	19 July 1936	4 September 1936	47 days	Republican Union	José Giral	Manuel Azaña (1936–1939)	
Vicente Uribe (Note: Prime Minister Juan Negrín served as acting agriculture minister from September 7 to September 10, 1938.) (1902–1961)	4 September 1936	5 March 1939	2 years, 182 days	Communist	Francisco Largo Caballero	Manuel Azaña (1936–1939)	
Vicente Uribe (1902–1961)	4 September 1936	5 March 1939	2 years, 182 days	Communist	Juan Negrín	Manuel Azaña (1936–1939)	
J. González Marín (Note: During the short-lived National Defence Council, J. González Marín assumed all the affairs regarding economy and finance, which included agriculture.) (?–1988)	5 March 1939	31 March 1939	26 days	Independent (CNT)	National Defence Council	José Miaja (1939)	
Rebel side
Eufemio Olmedo Ortega	5 October 1936	31 January 1938	1 year, 118 days	Independent	Junta Técnica del Estado	Francisco Franco (1939–1975)	
The Count of San Rodrigo (1896–1992)	31 January 1938	1 April 1939	1 year, 60 days	National Movement	Franco I	Francisco Franco (1939–1975)	
End of the Spanish Civil War						Francisco Franco (1939–1975)	
The Count of San Rodrigo (1896–1992)	1 April 1939	9 August 1939	130 days	National Movement	Franco I	Francisco Franco (1939–1975)	
The Count of Benjumea (1878–1963)	9 August 1939	19 May 1941	1 year, 283 days	National Movement	Franco II	Francisco Franco (1939–1975)	
The Duke of Primo de Rivera (1904–1964)	19 May 1941	20 July 1945	4 years, 62 days	National Movement	Franco II	Francisco Franco (1939–1975)	
Carlos Rein (1897–1992)	20 July 1945	19 July 1951	5 years, 364 days	National Movement	Franco III	Francisco Franco (1939–1975)	
Rafael Cavestany (1902–1958)	19 July 1951	25 February 1957	5 years, 221 days	National Movement	Franco IV	Francisco Franco (1939–1975)	
Cirilo Cánovas (1902–1958)	25 February 1957	7 July 1965	8 years, 132 days	National Movement	Franco V	Francisco Franco (1939–1975)	
Cirilo Cánovas (1902–1958)	25 February 1957	7 July 1965	8 years, 132 days	National Movement	Franco VI	Francisco Franco (1939–1975)	
Adolfo Díaz-Ambrona Moreno (1908–1971)	7 July 1965	29 October 1969	4 years, 114 days	National Movement	Franco VII	Francisco Franco (1939–1975)	
Tomás Allende y García-Baxter (1920–1987)	29 October 1969	11 December 1975	6 years, 43 days	National Movement	Franco VIII	Francisco Franco (1939–1975)	
Tomás Allende y García-Baxter (1920–1987)	29 October 1969	11 December 1975	6 years, 43 days	National Movement	Luis Carrero Blanco	Francisco Franco (1939–1975)	
Tomás Allende y García-Baxter (1920–1987)	29 October 1969	11 December 1975	6 years, 43 days	National Movement	The Duke of Fernández-Miranda (acting)	Francisco Franco (1939–1975)	
Tomás Allende y García-Baxter (1920–1987)	29 October 1969	11 December 1975	6 years, 43 days	National Movement	The Marquess of Arias Navarro	Francisco Franco (1939–1975)	
Tomás Allende y García-Baxter (1920–1987)	29 October 1969	11 December 1975	6 years, 43 days	National Movement	The Marquess of Arias Navarro	Juan Carlos I (1975–2014)	
Virgilio Oñate Gil (1924–1987)	11 December 1975	7 July 1976	209 days	National Movement	The Marquess of Arias Navarro	Juan Carlos I (1975–2014)	
Fernando Abril Martorell (1936–1998)	7 July 1976	4 July 1977	362 days	Centrist	The Duke of Suárez	Juan Carlos I (1975–2014)	
José Enrique Martínez Genique (born 1935)	4 July 1977	24 February 1978	235 days	Centrist	The Duke of Suárez	Juan Carlos I (1975–2014)	
The Marquess of Mirasol (born 1941)	24 February 1978	1 December 1981	3 years, 280 days	Centrist	The Duke of Suárez	Juan Carlos I (1975–2014)	
The Marquess of Mirasol (born 1941)	24 February 1978	1 December 1981	3 years, 280 days	Centrist	The Marquess of Ría de Ribadeo	Juan Carlos I (1975–2014)	
José Luis Álvarez (1930–2023)	1 December 1981	12 September 1982	285 days	Centrist	The Marquess of Ría de Ribadeo	Juan Carlos I (1975–2014)	
José Luis García Ferrero (1929–2020)	12 September 1982	2 December 1982	81 days	Independent	The Marquess of Ría de Ribadeo	Juan Carlos I (1975–2014)	
Carlos Romero (born 1941)	2 December 1982	12 March 1991	8 years, 100 days	Socialist	Felipe González	Juan Carlos I (1975–2014)	
Pedro Solbes (1942–2023)	12 March 1991	13 July 1993	2 years, 123 days	Socialist	Felipe González	Juan Carlos I (1975–2014)	
Vicente Albero (born 1944)	13 July 1993	5 May 1994	296 days	Socialist	Felipe González	Juan Carlos I (1975–2014)	
Luis María Atienza (born 1957)	5 May 1994	5 May 1996	2 years, 0 days	Socialist	Felipe González	Juan Carlos I (1975–2014)	
Loyola de Palacio (1950–2006)	5 May 1996	30 April 1999	2 years, 360 days	Popular	José María Aznar	Juan Carlos I (1975–2014)	
Jesús Posada (born 1945)	30 April 1999	27 April 2000	363 days	Popular	José María Aznar	Juan Carlos I (1975–2014)	
Miguel Arias Cañete (born 1950)	27 April 2000	18 April 2004	3 years, 357 days	Popular	José María Aznar	Juan Carlos I (1975–2014)	
Elena Espinosa (born 1960)	18 April 2004	21 October 2010	6 years, 186 days	Socialist	José Luis Rodríguez Zapatero	Juan Carlos I (1975–2014)	
Rosa Aguilar (born 1957)	21 October 2010	22 December 2011	1 year, 62 days	Independent	José Luis Rodríguez Zapatero	Juan Carlos I (1975–2014)	
Miguel Arias Cañete (born 1950)	22 December 2011	29 April 2014	2 years, 128 days	Popular	Mariano Rajoy	Juan Carlos I (1975–2014)	
Isabel García Tejerina (born 1968)	29 April 2014	4 November 2016	4 years, 39 days	Popular	Mariano Rajoy	Juan Carlos I (1975–2014)	
Isabel García Tejerina (born 1968)	29 April 2014	4 November 2016	4 years, 39 days	Popular	Mariano Rajoy	Felipe VI (2014-present)	
Luis Planas (born 1952)	7 June 2018	Incumbent	8 years, 136 days	Socialist	Pedro Sánchez	Felipe VI (2014-present)	
