= European Agricultural Fund for Rural Development =

The European Agricultural Fund for Rural Development (EAFRD) is one of the European Structural and Investment Funds which was set up for the financing of Rural Development Programme (RDP) actions by European Union Council Regulation (EC) No 1290/2005 of 21 June 2005 on the financing of the Common Agricultural Policy (CAP).

== Reasoning ==
Rural development is a vitally important policy area, affecting over 50% of the population of the EU and almost 90% of EU land. Farming and forestry remain central to rural economies, and rural development also focuses on revitalising rural areas in other ways. Furthermore, issues such as climate change, renewable energy, biodiversity and water management are becoming increasingly important aspects of the EU's rural development policy.

== Budget ==
Over €200 billion in funding is available to support the implementation of 94 RDPs across the EU, for the programming period 2007–2013. Almost half of this money is provided by the EAFRD, overseen by the European Commission's Directorate General for Agriculture and Rural Development.

EAFRD budgets in the RDPs are used to achieve a variety of rural development goals, including improving the competitiveness of farm, forest and agri-food businesses; helping protect the natural environment; supporting rural economies; and assisting quality of life in rural areas.

== See also ==
- European Agricultural Guarantee Fund - EAGF
- Special Accession Programme for Agriculture and Rural Development - SAPARD
- Spanish Agricultural Guarantee Fund - FEGA
