= Spanish Agricultural Guarantee Fund =

- Fondo Español de Garantía Agraria
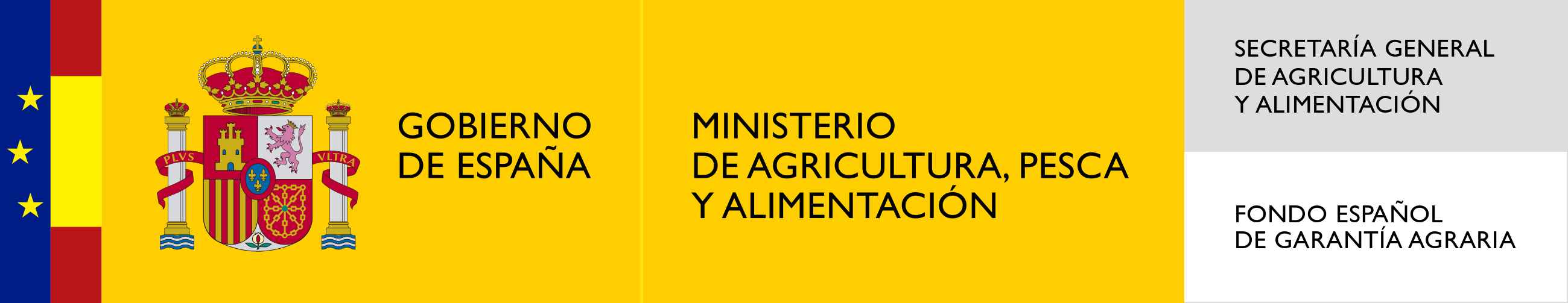
- Logotype

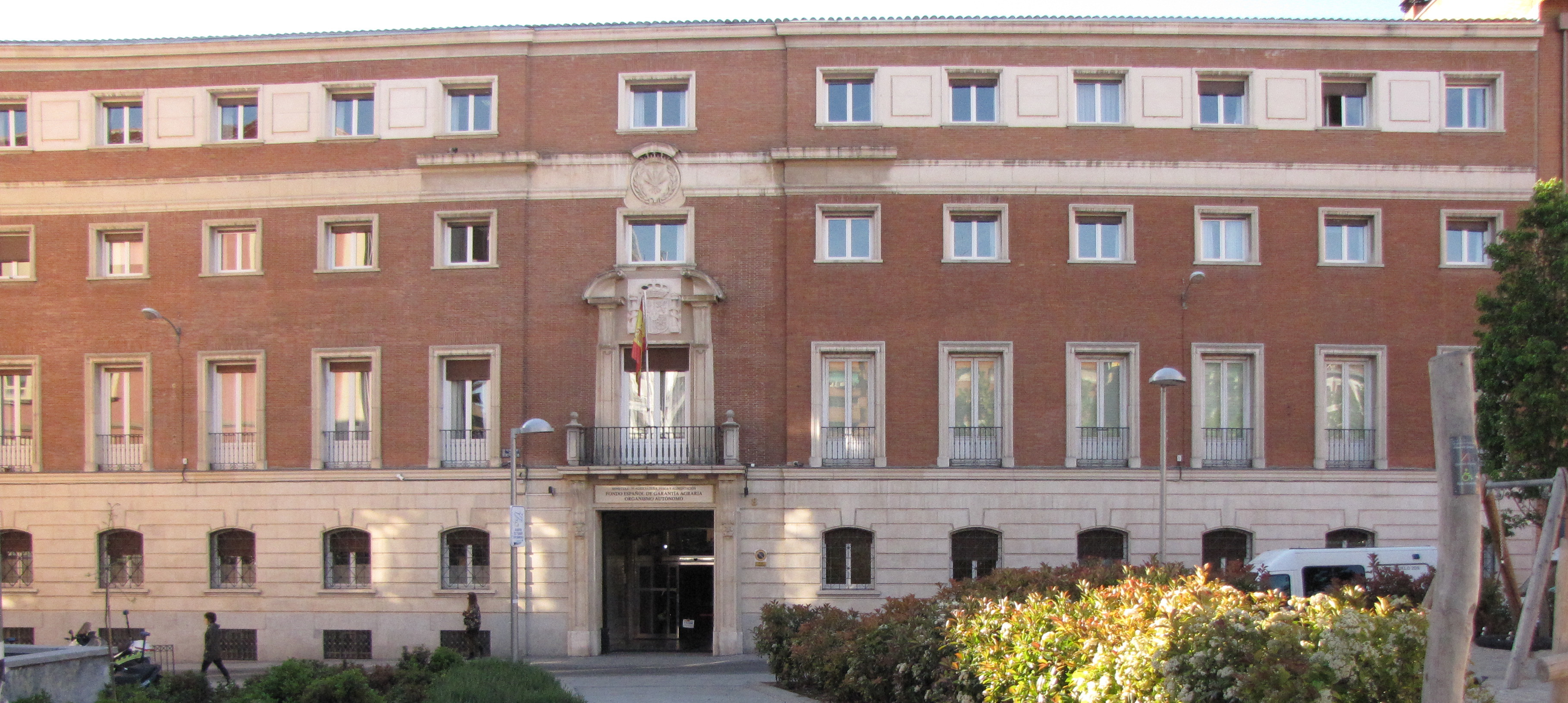
- FEGA headquarters

Agency overview
- Formed: December 28, 1995; 30 years ago
- Jurisdiction: Spain
- Headquarters: Madrid, Spain
- Employees: 239 (2020)
- Annual budget: € 7.5 billion, 2023
- Agency executive: Miguel Ángel Riesgo Pablo, President
- Parent agency: Ministry of Agriculture, Fisheries and Food
- Website: www.fega.gob.es

The Spanish Agricultural Guarantee Fund (Spanish: Fondo Español de Garantía Agraria, FEGA) is an autonomous agency of the Government of Spain, attached to the Ministry of Agriculture, Fisheries and Food, whose main mission is to ensure that the funds from the European Agricultural Guarantee Fund (EAGF) and the European Agricultural Fund for Rural Development (EAFRD) of the Common Agricultural Policy (CAP) assigned to Spain are strictly applied to achieve the objectives of this policy.

It also ensures that the funds reach the beneficiaries who meet the requirements established for their granting, promotes the homogeneous application of CAP aid throughout the national territory, avoiding fraud and minimizing the risks of financial corrections. derived from incorrect management of said funds. Likewise, with regard to the Fund for European Aid to the Most Deprived (FEAD) and the European Maritime and Fisheries Fund (EMFF), it is responsible for their correct application and management in the case of the FEAD, and in the case of the EMFF, to certify that the management of the fund has been conducted according to the European and national regulations.

== History ==
The FEGA was created in 1995 during the term of Minister Luis María Atienza to unify the management of aid and payments of the Common Agricultural Policy (CAP) by merging the Fund for the Management and Regulation of Agricultural Production and Prices (Spanish: Fondo de Ordenación y Regulación de Producciones y Precios Agrarios, FORPPA) and the National Service for Agricultural Products (Spanish: Servicio Nacional de Productos Agrarios, SENPA). Since Atienza took office, he carried out a restructuring policy the Department of Agriculture to adapt it to the new framework within the European Union and the devolution of powers to the regions due to many State agencies had been left empty of powers or with little space to develop them.

It was originally created as an "autonomous commercial and financial agency", until in 1998 it was adapted to the single and common category of autonomous agency. That same year, its powers were expanded not only for coordination, but also as a paying body and as the national authority in charge of European controls in its field of work.

== Structure ==
The agency is structured as follows:

- The President. The president of the agency is the executive office of it. It is appointed by the Council of Ministers at the proposal of the Minister of Agriculture.
- The Secretary-General. The secretary-general is the second-in-command to the president. It supports and replace him or her when necessary. As his or her main assistant, the secretary-general manages the human resources of the agency and all those aspects that allow the agency to be operative day by day.
- The Deputy Director-General for Economic and Financial Affairs. It is responsible for the budgetary, financial, accounting and patrimonial management of the agency, as well as the preparation and elaboration of the draft of its budget and the follow-up and control of its execution.
- The Deputy Director-General for Market Regulation. It is in charge of establishing the regulations regarding the intervention of agricultural and livestock markets; of the proposal of purchase and sale of the products; the processing and management of export refunds and similar aid that may affect trade with third countries; the management of intra-community traffic control documents; payment authorization when necessary; and act as the payment agency for EAGF expenses related to the common organization of the market in the sector of fishery and aquaculture products.
- The Deputy Director-General for Direct Aid. It is responsible for the control of the actions of the Spanish regions in their competences; the establishment of the controls and sanctions that must be applied; and the design, execution and maintenance of the necessary instruments for the application of the Integrated Management and Control System of the Common Agricultural Policy.
- The Deputy Director-General for Special Sectors. It is responsible for the coordination and monitoring of the actions of the Spanish regions to guarantee the harmonized application of community regulations and basic state regulations in relation to aid schemes other than direct aid (fruits and vegetables, viticulture, agro-industrial sectors and private product storage).
- The Deputy Director-General for Agricultural Funds. It is responsible for promoting and guaranteeing the harmonized application of the legislation related to the EAGF and EAFRD funds; coordinate the dialogue and inform the European Commission and other institutions of the European Union, where appropriate, on all issues arising from the financing, management and monitoring of the CAP; coordinate the national pre-financing system of the EAGF and EAFRD funds; coordinate the investigations of the European Commission and other institutions of the Union for those questions related to the EAGF and EAFRD funds; and coordinate the clearance of accounts and clearance of conformity procedure by which the Commission decides to exclude the paying agencies from financing expenses of the agricultural funds.

== See also ==
- Common Agricultural Policy
- European Agricultural Guarantee Fund
- European Agricultural Fund for Rural Development
