= Common Agricultural Policy =

Agricultural policy of the European Union

The Common Agricultural Policy (CAP) is the agricultural policy of the European Commission. It implements a system of agricultural subsidies, risk management instruments and other programmes. Along with the Common Fisheries Policy, the CAP is the main policy governing food production in the EU.

The CAP was introduced in 1962 and has since then undergone several changes to reduce the EEC budget cost (from 73% in 1985, to 37% in 2017) and consider rural development in its aims. It has however, been criticised on the grounds of its cost, and its environmental and humanitarian effects.

== Overview ==
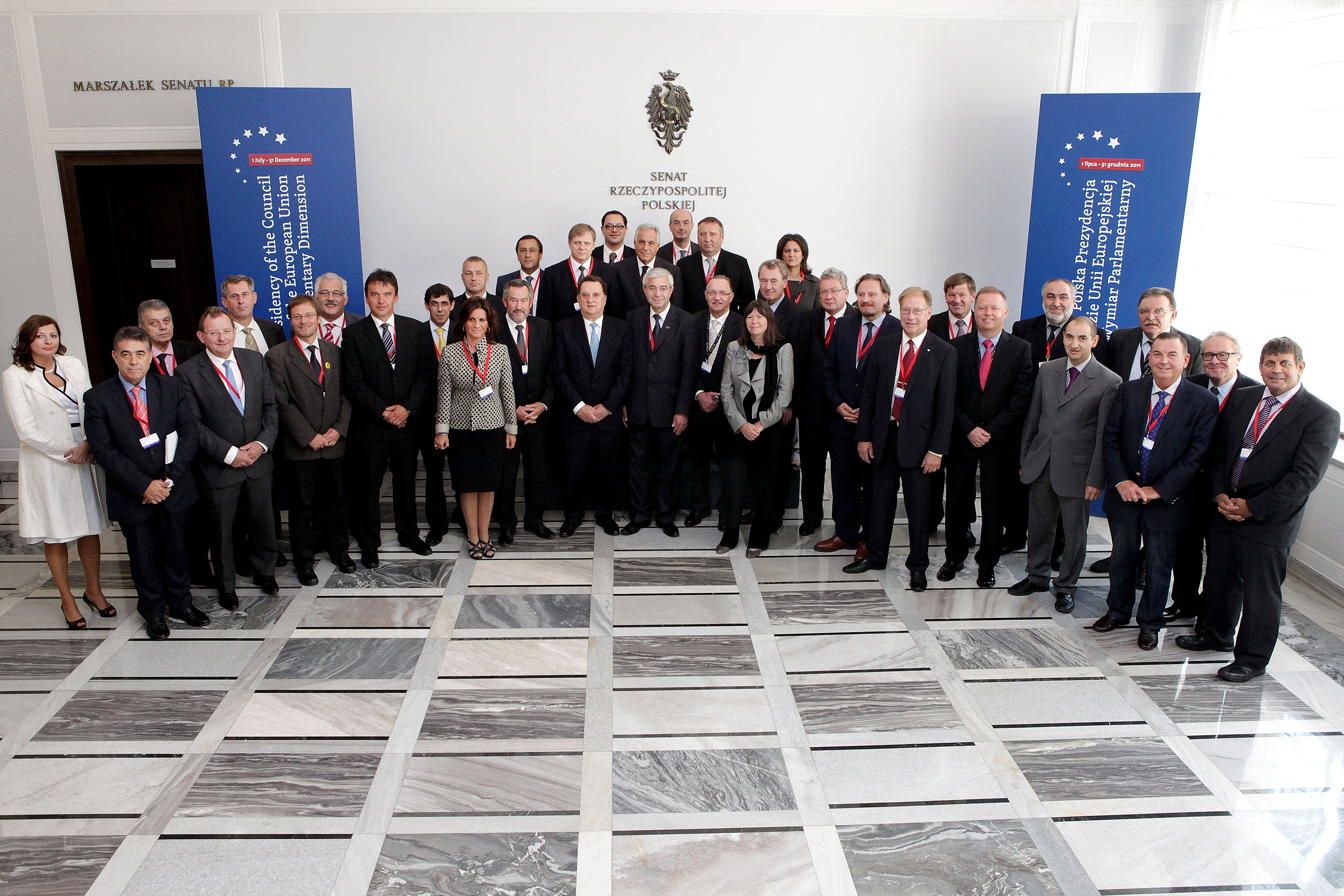
Participants of the Common Agricultural Policy 2014–2020 meeting of Chairpersons of Agriculture Committees of the EU member states in the Polish Senate

The CAP is often explained as the result of a political compromise between France and Germany: German industry would have access to the French market; in exchange, Germany would help pay for France's farmers. The CAP has always been a difficult area of EU policy to reform; it is a problem that began in the 1960s and one that has continued to the present, albeit less severely. Changes to the CAP are proposed by the European Commission, after a public consultation, which then sends its proposals to the Council and to the European Parliament. Both the Council and the European Parliament have to agree to any changes. The Parliament was involved in the process of change for the first time in 2013. The involvement of the Parliament, which represents the citizens, increases the democratic legitimacy of the CAP. Outside Brussels proper, the impact of the powerful farming lobby has been a factor in determining EU agricultural policy since the earliest days of integration.

In recent times change has been more forthcoming because of external trade demands and intrusion in agricultural affairs by other parts of the EU policy framework, such as consumer advocate working groups and the environmental departments of the Union. In addition, Euroscepticism in states such as Denmark (and formerly the UK) is fed in part by the CAP, which Eurosceptics consider detrimental to their economies.

Proponents claim that the CAP is beneficial to Europe as it protects the rural way of life although it is recognised that it affects world poverty. The policy has evolved significantly since it was introduced in 1962, on the legal foundation established by the Treaty of Rome (1957). Substantial reforms over the years have moved the CAP away from a production-oriented policy.

CAP has been divided into two pillars:

- Agricultural production support and common organisation of markets (Pillar I, known otherwise earlier as the agricultural guarantee section)
- Rural development policy (Pillar II, the agricultural structural policy pillar, known earlier as the agricultural guidance section).

Accordingly, the European Agricultural Guidance and Guarantee Fund (EAGGF) of the EU, which initially used to fund the CAP as a whole, has been replaced in 2007 with two separate funds, one for each of the two pillars:

- the European Agricultural Guarantee Fund (EAGF) and
- the European Agricultural Fund for Rural Development (EAFRD, a structural fund).

CAP reforms have steadily lowered its share in the EU budget: in 1980 it accounted for more than 70% of the EU expenditure while in 2021 it accounted for less than 25%. In 2019 France was the biggest beneficiary of the policy by 17.3%, followed by Spain with 12.4% and Germany (11.2%), Italy (10.4%), Poland (8.1%) and the UK (7.2%). The 2003 reform introduced the Single Payment Scheme (SPS) or as it is known as well the Single Farm Payment (SFP). The most recent reform was made in 2013 by Commissioner Dacian Cioloș and applies for the period 2014 to 2020.

Since 1970, a separate Common Fisheries Policy (CFP) has been in place for the EU fisheries and fish market, with its own separate structural policy fund established as a spin-off from the EAGGF in 1993 (currently operating under the name European Maritime, Fisheries and Aquaculture Fund or EMFAF), while the fish market interventions have remained financed from the European Agricultural Guarantee Fund.

== Agricultural production support and common organisation of markets (Pillar I) ==
This part of CAP is financed from the European Agricultural Guarantee Fund (EAGF). Each country can choose if the payment will be established at the farm level or at the regional level. Farmers receiving the SFP have the flexibility to produce any commodity on their land except fruit, vegetables and table potatoes. In addition, they are obliged to keep their land in good agricultural and environmental condition (cross-compliance). Farmers have to respect environmental, food safety, phytosanitary and animal welfare standards. This is a penalty measure: if farmers do not respect these standards, their payment will be reduced.

The direct aids and market related expenditure made up 31% of the total EU budget in 2010. Together with 11% for Rural Development, the total CAP budget took 42% of the total EU budget The CAP budget shrank relatively from 75% in 1984 to 37% of the total EU budget in 2017.

Intervention mechanisms diminished significantly, for instance the Commission only intervened on: common wheat, butter, and skimmed milk powder. The Health Check of the CAP agreed in November 2008 added on a number of measures to help the farmers to respond better to signals from the markets and to face new challenges. Among a range of measures, the agreement abolished arable set-aside, increased milk quotas gradually leading up to their abolition in 2015, and converted market intervention into a genuine safety net. Ministers also agreed to increase modulation, whereby direct payments to farmers were reduced and the money transferred to the Rural Development Fund.

Milk quotas expired in April 2015. To prepare the dairy farmers for this transition, a 'soft landing' was ensured by increasing quotas by one per cent every year between 2009–10 and 2013–14. For Italy, the 5 per cent increase was introduced immediately in 2009–10. In 2009–10 and 2010–11, farmers who exceed their milk quotas by more than 6 per cent had to pay a levy 50 per cent higher than the normal penalty.

=== Production and market sectors covered by the CAP ===
The common agricultural policy price intervention covers only certain agricultural products:

- cereal, rice, potatoes and flour
- cooking oil
- energy crops, vegetable oil fuel, biodiesel, bioethanol
- animal feed stuffs and dried fodder
- milk and milk products (such as condensed milk, powder milk, butter, cheese, whey, buttermilk, cream, yoghurt, kefir)
- grapes, wine, vinegar, cider
- honey
- beef and veal, poultry meat and eggs, pig meat, sheep / lamb meat and goat meat
- sugar
- fruit and vegetables (including cultivated mushrooms)
- cotton
- peas, chickpea, lentil, field beans, soybean
- sweet lupins
- olives
- flax seeds
- flax fibers
- silkworms
- hemp
- tobacco
- hops
- seeds
- animal semen, egg cells and embryos
- flowers and live plants

Fish, molluscs and crustaceans are covered by the separate Common Fisheries Policy.

The coverage of products in the external trade regime is more extensive than the coverage of the CAP regime. This is to limit competition between EU products and alternative external goods (for example, lychee juice could potentially compete with orange juice).

=== Objectives ===
The objectives, set out in Article 39 of the Treaty on the Functioning of the European Union, are as follows:

1. to increase productivity, by promoting technical progress and ensuring the optimum use of the factors of production, in particular labor;
2. to ensure a fair standard of living for the agricultural Community;
3. to stabilise markets;
4. to secure availability of supplies;
5. to provide consumers with food at reasonable prices.

The CAP recognised the need to take account of the social structure of agriculture and of the structural and natural disparities between the various agricultural regions and to effect the appropriate adjustments by degrees.

CAP is an integrated system of measures that works by maintaining commodity price levels within the EU and by subsidizing production. There are a number of mechanisms:

- Import levies are applied to specified goods imported into the EU. These are set at a level to raise the World market price up to the EU target price. The target price is chosen as the maximum desirable price for those goods within the EU.
- Import quotas are used as a means of restricting the amount of food being imported into the EU. Some non-member countries have negotiated quotas allowing them to sell particular goods within the EU without tariffs. This notably applies to countries that had a traditional trade link with a member country.
- An internal intervention price is set. If the internal market price falls below the intervention level then the EU will buy up goods to raise the price to the intervention level. The intervention price is set lower than the target price. The internal market price can only vary in the range between the intervention price and target price.
- Direct subsidies are paid to farmers. This was originally intended to encourage farmers to choose to grow those crops attracting subsidies and maintain home-grown supplies. Subsidies were generally paid on the area of land growing a particular crop, rather than on the total amount of crop produced. Reforms implemented from 2005 are phasing out specific subsidies in favour of flat-rate payments based only on the area of land in cultivation, and for adopting environmentally beneficial farming methods. The change is intended to give farmers more freedom to choose for themselves those crops most in demand and reduce the economic incentive to overproduce.
- Production quotas and 'set-aside' payments were introduced in an effort to prevent overproduction of some foods (for example, milk, grain, wine) that attracted subsidies well in excess of market prices. The need to store and dispose of excess produce was wasteful of resources and brought the CAP into disrepute. A secondary market evolved, especially in the sale of milk quotas, while some farmers made imaginative use of 'set-aside', for example, setting aside land that was difficult to farm. Currently set-aside has been suspended, subject to further decision about its future, following rising prices for some commodities and increasing interest in growing bio-fuels.

The change in subsidies was intended to be completed by 2011, but individual governments had some freedom to decide how the new scheme would be introduced. The UK government decided to run a dual system of subsidies in England, each year transferring a larger proportion of the total payment to the new scheme. Payments under the old scheme were frozen at their levels averaged over 2002–2003 and reduced each subsequent year. This allowed farmers in England a period where their income was maintained, but which they could use to change farm practices in accord with the new regime. Other governments chose to wait, and change the system in one go at the latest possible time. Governments also had limited discretion to continue to direct a small proportion of the total subsidy to support specific crops. Alterations to the qualifying rules meant that many small landowners became eligible to apply for grants and the Rural Payments Agency in England received double the previous number of applications (110,000).

The CAP also aims to promote legislative harmonisation within the Community. Differing laws in member countries can create problems for anyone seeking to trade between countries. Examples are regulations on permitted preservatives or Food coloring, labelling regulations, use of hormones or other drugs in livestock intended for human consumption and disease control, animal welfare regulations. The process of removing all hidden legislative barriers to trade is still incomplete.

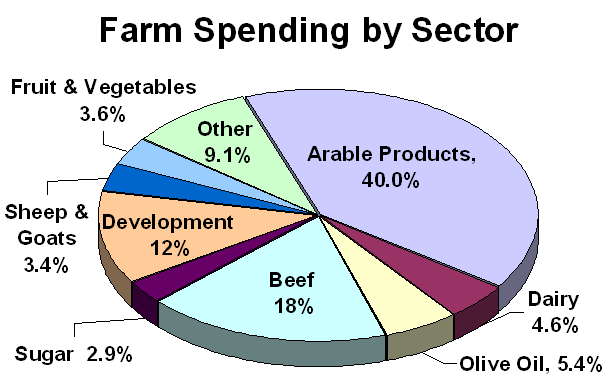
CAP farm spending by sector

== Rural development policy (structural policy, Pillar II) ==
Since 2000, the second pillar of the CAP, the EU rural development policy has been in effect, financed since 2007 from the European Agricultural Fund for Rural Development, one of the five European Structural and Investment Funds. This policy aims to promote the economic, social and environmental development of the countryside. Its budget, 11% of the total EU budget, has been allocated along three axes. The first axis focuses on improving the competitiveness of the farm and forestry sector through support for restructuring, development and innovation. The second one concerns the improvement of the environment and the countryside through support for land management as well as helping to fight climate change. Such projects could for example concern preserving water quality, sustainable land management, planting trees to prevent erosion and floods. The third axis concerns improving the quality of life in rural areas and encouraging diversification of economic activity. The policy also provided support to the Leader rural development methodology, under which Local Action Groups designed and carried out local development strategies for their area. Member States distribute second-pillar funds through actions of national and regional rural development programmes.

Rural development, the second pillar of CAP, is a vitally important policy area in the European Union. It works to improve aspects of the economic, environmental and social situation of the EU's rural areas. Rural regions cover 57% of the EU territory and 24% of the EU population. Together with intermediate regions they comprise 91% of the EU territory and 59% of the total EU population. Across the EU, the dimensions of the rural-urban territorial vary – from countries with an explicitly defined rural character (such as Ireland, Sweden, Finland, etc.) to Member States that tend to be more urbanised (such as the Benelux countries, Malta).

The policy works essentially through seven-year rural development programmes (RDPs) – which operate at either national or regional level. These are funded from the EU budget, national/regional budgets and private sources. Rural Development policy targets rural areas as a whole, with a focus on ensuring the competitiveness of farms and forestry, delivering sustainable management of natural resources and climate action as well as create growth and jobs in rural areas.

=== Budget ===
Rural development policy is financed by three categories of funding:

- public money from the EU budget – i.e. from the EAFRD
- public money from national/regional budgets – depending on whether the programme is national or regional
- private money – in some cases, beneficiaries have to provide some funding themselves (from their own resources, a bank loan etc.)

The expected total public spending (EU + national + regional) on rural development policy in the period between 2014 and 2020 is EUR 161 billion.

=== Rural development objectives and priorities 2014–2020 ===
The three objectives and overall purpose of the CAP include:

- fostering the competitiveness of agriculture;
- ensuring the sustainable management of natural resources, and climate action;
- achieving a balanced territorial development of rural economies and communities, including the creation and maintenance of employment.

However, in practical terms RDPs are drawn up with reference to six more specific priorities, which are further divided into more detailed focus areas.

1. Knowledge transfer & innovation in agriculture, forestry & rural areas
2. Farm viability / competitiveness, sustainable management of forests
3. Food chain organisation, animal welfare, risk management in agriculture
4. Ecosystems related to agriculture and forestry
5. Resource efficiency, low-carbon / climate-resilient economy
6. Social inclusion, poverty reduction, economic development

=== National and regional rural development programs ===
There is a total of 118 Rural Development Programs(RDP) in the EU. In most Member States there is a national program which covers the entire territory but in some countries there are several programs, most often linked to regions: France (30), Spain(22), Italy(23), Germany(15), Portugal(3), United Kingdom(4), Belgium(2), Finland(2).

==== Designing rural development programs ====
A given RDP links the priorities of rural development policy to the situation on its territory via a SWOT analysis. The RDP then sets out a selection of measures drawn from the Rural Development Regulation to address the priorities in the appropriate way.

A measure is essentially a set of one types of activity, project, investment etc. which may be funded within a RDP to achieve the priorities of rural development policy.

For example, the measure Investments in physical assets as set out in the Rural development Regulation allows support for:

- Investments in farms to improve their performance;
- Investments in processing and marketing (i.e. not necessarily only for farmers);
- Investments in farm- or forest-level infrastructure; and
- Non-productive (i.e. primarily environmental) investments. Measure descriptions in the EU Rural Development Regulation give information of varying detail (according to the measure) about who is potentially eligible for support, what sorts of activity etc. can be supported, and whether there are limits on how much support may be offered.

MS follow the rules for a given measure but, within this framework, still enjoy considerable flexibility about how they use it. For example, a MS might choose to make the measure Investments in physical assets available in its RDP, but only with regard to environmental investments.

==== Use of targets ====
In explaining how it will use the various measures together to address the priorities / focus areas of rural development policy within its RDP, the MS / region set various targets against these. The nature of the target varies according to the focus area. For example, against focus area 5A – Increasing efficiency in water use by agriculture – the standard target indicator is the percentage of the Irrigation area in the program area which is expected to switch to more efficient irrigation equipment as a result of rural development support.

==== Development, approval and amendments ====
A MS / region draws up its RDP in close consultation with a wide range of interested parties, including bodies representing Civil society. The MS / region submits its RDP to the Commission for analysis. The Commission approves the RDP when satisfied concerning its legality and quality (usually after several months of detailed discussion with the MS concerned).

RDPs usually need to be amended several times during their seven-year life, to keep them as relevant, effective and efficient as possible – in light of changing circumstances and the findings of monitoring and evaluation. Program amendments which go beyond surface details require the Commission's approval.

==== Project selection ====
When a RDP has been drawn up and approved, it is advertised. People, businesses etc. which would like to receive support for projects apply for it. Provided that they are eligible for the type of support in question (according to the RDP), they may be selected for support on the basis of objective selection criteria .

- Example: In a given RDP, a MS has decided to offer support for environmental investments in forests under the measure "Investments in forest area development". The measure as set out in the Rural Development Regulation allows a wide range of entities to be eligible for support. The MS decides to keep this broad approach in terms of eligibility, but to give priority to "private forest-holders". At the moment when projects are selected for support, therefore, extra selection "points" will be awarded to applications from private forest-holders. This approach would be announced in overview in the RDP itself, but worked out in detail in subsequent national implementing rules.

==== Monitoring and evaluation ====
Monitoring is essentially about tracking how fast, and in what way, RDPs are being implemented – with reference to financial data and other indicators. RDPs are monitored continuously. Within this process, program authorities must each send an annual implementation report for each program by 30 June every year, starting in 2016 and ending in 2024. Evaluation involves rather deeper analysis (especially of effectiveness, efficiency and impact). The key stages are:

- Ex ante evaluation: Drawn up under the responsibility of the relevant program authority, this is submitted to the Commission at the same time as the program, and assesses the program's quality.
- Evaluation during the programming period (in enhanced Annual Implementation reports 2017 and 2019 in particular): MS arrange for this to be done on the basis of an evaluation plan. The Commission may also carry out evaluations if it wishes.
- Ex post evaluation: Drawn up under the responsibility of the relevant program authority, this is submitted to the Commission by the end of 2024.
- Synthesis of evaluations: Syntheses at Union level of the ex ante and ex post evaluations are undertaken under the responsibility of the Commission and completed by 31 December of the year following the submission of the relevant evaluations.

The monitoring and evaluation processes draw on a range of indicators concerning financial execution, outputs, results and impact.

==== Ex ante conditionalities ====
Ex ante conditionalities (EACs) help to ensure that MS have set the right background conditions for spending funds effectively and efficiently through their program. Some EACs are general in the sense that they apply to all of the European Structural and Investment Funds (ESIFs).

- Example: MS must have in place arrangements for applying EU public procurement law in the fields covered by the ESIF Funds. This is important because many program will allocate significant sums to projects covered by public procurement rules.
- Other EACS are fund-specific (they do not apply to all ESIF Funds). The EAFRD has its own EACs.
- Example: MS must have set out standards for Good Agricultural and Environmental Condition (GAEC) in national law and must specify them in their RDPs.

MS declare their fulfilment or non-fulfilment of EACs in their programs, and summaries it in their Partnership Agreement. The Commission checks this information.

When a MS does not meet some or all EACs, usually the MS is required to follow an action plan which allows it to meet the EAC by the end of 2016.

==== Performance reserve ====
6% of the EAFRD financial resources allocated to a given RDP are placed in a performance reserve, which is provisionally divided up between some or all of the rural development priorities. After receipt of the 2019 annual implementation reports, the Commission checks which priorities have performed well – i.e. against which priorities particular milestones (key targets) have been met.

Where the milestones of a given priority have been met, the sum from the performance reserve initially allocated to that priority is confirmed. Where the milestones of a given priority have not been met, the sum initially allocated from the performance reserve is transferred to priorities whose milestones have been met. This approach is intended to focus minds more sharply on achieving results.

== Criticism ==
The CAP has been roundly criticised by many diverse interests since its inception. Criticism has been wide-ranging, and even the European Commission has long acknowledged the numerous defects of the policy. In May 2007, Sweden became the first EU country to take the position that all EU farm subsidies should be abolished, except those related to environmental protection.

=== Anti-development ===
Many developing countries are highly dependent on agriculture. The FAO finds that agriculture provides for the livelihood of 70% of the world's poorest people. As such, the subsidies in the CAP are charged with preventing developing countries from exporting agricultural produce to the EU on a level playing field. The WTO Doha Development Round, which intended to increase global development, has stalled due to the developed countries' refusal to remove agricultural subsidies.

A review of post-2013 proposal by Prof. Alan Matthews underlines the lack of ambition in tackling the issue. "This CAP reform was not intended to address the trade barriers used to keep some EU market prices higher than world market levels. The EU has reduced the effect of these barriers for a number of developing countries through extending the scope of preferential access under various trade agreements, and a further reduction is being negotiated in the WTO Doha Round. Nonetheless, developing countries will be disappointed that the opportunity was not taken in this reform to set a final date for the ending of export subsidies. A more ambitious CAP reform, in which the targeting of direct payments was pursued more insistently and coupled payments were phased out, would also have a greater effect in removing the remaining distortions caused by the CAP to world markets." In another study, Prof. Matthews showed how linking EU farm subsidies to goals such as environmental protection could help farmers in poor countries, although much depends on the size of the payments and how they are made.

At the same time, however, the EU remains the world's biggest importer of farm products from developing countries. On average, over the period 2006–2008, the EU has imported €53 billion worth of goods. This is more than the US, Japan, Canada, Australia and New Zealand combined. This is further encouraged by a preferential market access agreement for products from developing countries. Today, around 71% of the EU's agricultural imports originate from developing countries. The 'Everything but Arms' program, gives the world's 49 least-developed countries duty-free and quota-free access to the EU market. Under the Economic Partnership Agreements, countries from the African, Caribbean and Pacific group enjoy full duty-free and quota free access.

=== Funding of animal farming ===
A study reported in 2024 that 80% of the CAP's subsidies in 2013 supported emissions-intensive animal products, a ratio that hasn't significantly changed since. Critics argue that these funds could have been better allocated to promote a transition toward more sustainable, plant-based food systems. According to Olga Kikou, the CAP also created conditions for overproduction, which incentivises intensive animal farming and is incompatible with animal welfare.

=== Oversupply and its redistribution ===
To perpetuate the viability of European agriculture in its current state, the CAP-mandated demand for certain farm produce is set at a high level compared with demand in the free market (see § CAP as a form of state intervention). This leads to the European Union purchasing millions of tons of surplus output every year at the stated guaranteed market price, and storing this produce in large quantities (leading to what critics have called 'butter mountains' and 'wine lakes'), before selling the produce wholesale to developing nations. In 2007 in response to a parliamentary written question the UK government revealed that over the preceding year the EU Public Stock had amassed "13,476,812 tones of cereal, rice, sugar and milk products and 3,529,002 hectoliters of alcohol/wine", although the EU has claimed this level of oversupply is unlikely to be repeated. This point was actually proven in January 2009, where the EU had a store of 717,810 tons of cereals, 41,422 tons of sugar and a 2.3 million hectoliter wine surplus, showing that the stocks had diminished dramatically.

The food crisis in 2008, which saw the stocks empty out and the prices skyrocket, even introduced a popular demand for the introduction of emergency stocks of agricultural produce in the EU, which would help stabilise prices both on the very volatile markets. In 2010, the European Commission announced its intention to sell out of its cereal stocks to stabilise the situation after a Russian grain export ban had stung world markets, sending wheat prices to two-year highs and sparked worries of a crisis in global food supplies that could spark widespread strains and protests.

In 2010, the EU decided to use existing intervention stocks (cereals, milk powder and limited quantities of butter) for its Food Aid for the Needy program for 2011. An estimated 13 million poor Europeans benefit from this scheme.

Parts of the EU stocks are exported with the use of export subsidies. It is argued that many African and Asian dairy, tomato, grain and poultry farmers cannot keep up with cheap competition from Europe, thus their incomes can no longer provide for their families. At the same time, many urbanised families in the developing world benefit from the relatively cheaper products stemming from Europe.

For dairy products, export subsidies rose in 2009 after having been stopped in 2008. In 2009, the main recipients of dairy products that benefited from export subsidies were: Russia, Saudi Arabia, Egypt and Nigeria.

According to the 2003 Human Development Report the average dairy cow in the year 2000 under the European Union received $913 in subsidies annually, while an average of $8 per human being was sent in aid to Sub-Saharan Africa.

The 2005 Human Development Report states "The basic problem to be addressed in the WTO negotiations on agriculture can be summarised in three words: rich country subsidies. In the last round of world trade negotiations rich countries promised to cut agricultural subsidies. Since then, they have increased them." Several reports from the latest negotiations in the WTO, however, contradict the theory of the 2005 HDR report. On 29 July 2008, the WTO negotiations in the Doha round finally collapsed because of differences between the US, India and China over agricultural trade.

=== Artificially high food prices ===
CAP price intervention has been criticised for creating artificially high food prices throughout the EU. High import tariffs (estimated at 18–28%) have the effect of keeping prices high by restricting competition by non-EU producers. It is estimated that public support for farmers in OECD countries costs a family of four on average nearly US$1,000 per year in higher prices and taxes. The European Commission has responded that the average EU household today spends 15% of its budget on food, compared to 30% in 1960.

The recent moves away from intervention buying, subsidies for specific crops, reductions in export subsidies, have changed the situation somewhat. In the past years intervention has been reduced or abolished in all sectors. After two decades of significant CAP reforms, farmers can now respond to market signals and increase production to react to the higher prices. Although the new decoupled payments were aimed at environmental measures, many farmers have found that without these payments their businesses would not be able to survive. With food prices dropping over the past thirty years in real terms, many products have been making less than their cost of production when sold at the farm gate.

=== Public health at the peril of agricultural policies ===
Public health professionals have also leveled criticism at the CAP and its support regimes, arguing that agricultural policy often disregards health. It is evident that supply outputs are generating widespread public health issues of obesity and diet-related non-communicable diseases (NCDs), such as cardio-vascular disease (CVD), cancer and type II diabetes. Diet is one of the major modifiable determinants in promoting or preventing chronic disease, and agricultural products have a major influence on the disease risk factors.

Initial criticism emerged in the early 2000s regarding the production orientation of the CAP and the need for decoupling due to the disjointed nature of agricultural production policy in relation to consumption (and thus nutrition). The arguments were re-enforced at the 2001 European Health Forum Gastein on the CAP, which made explicit – to policy makers – the link between nutrient quality of diets and agricultural policy. The Forum also identified opportunities to align the CAP to health objectives, more specifically by encouraging changes to dietary behaviour through adjusting CAP support.

Since 2008, under the leadership of the European Public Health and Agriculture Consortium (EPHAC), the public health nutrition narrative has gained traction in policy circles. Although agricultural policy-makers are beginning to realise the arguments for upstream health intervention, practical measures remain politically unpalatable. EPHAC maintains that agricultural policies can be used to internalise the health externalities of diet-related ill-health and improve population, society-wide public health nutrition.

Health groups have become increasingly vocal in their call for agricultural policies to contribute towards resolving the consumption problems of food; such as, excessive intake of saturated fatty acids (FSA), sugar and salt, or under-consumption of vitamins (leading to hypovitaminosis) and minerals. More attention should be paid, it is argued, on intervention policies upstream, at the primary food production and processing stages, to influence nutritional quality and the structural determinants of food choice, including; availability, accessibility and price.

=== Hurting smaller farms ===
Although most policy makers in Europe agree that they want to promote "family farms" and smaller-scale production, the CAP in fact rewards larger producers. Because the CAP has traditionally rewarded farmers who produce more, larger farms have benefited much more from subsidies than smaller farms. For example, a farm with 1000 hectares, earning an additional €100 per hectare will make an additional €100,000, while a 10 hectare farm will only make an extra €1000, disregarding economies of scale. As a result, most CAP subsidies have made their way to large scale farmers.

Since the 2003 reforms subsidies have been linked to the size of farms, so farmers get the same for a hectare of land regardless of how much land they own. So while subsidies allow small farms to exist, large farms tend to get the larger share of the subsidies. With the 2008 Health Check of the CAP, a first step was taken towards limiting CAP payments to very large landowners.

The European Commissioner responsible for Agriculture and Rural Development Dacian Cioloş in his Public Hearing upon his nomination has shown his concern in small farms: "small holdings represent an important share, not only in the new Member States but also in South Europe". He has emphasised that a structural policy is needed "to modernise" small farms and to "develop existing opportunities in local markets", where there is "high demand for local products".

=== Environmental problems ===
A common view is that the CAP has traditionally promoted a large expansion in agricultural production. At the same time it has allowed farmers to employ un-ecological ways of increasing production, such as the indiscriminate use of fertilisers and pesticides, with serious environmental consequences. However, a total re-focusing of the payment scheme in 2004 now puts the environment at the centre of farming policy. By linking the payments to farmers to a number of strict environmental standards (among others) in the so-called cross compliance scheme, farmers will have to face cuts in their subsidy levels if they don't meet the strict environmental requirements.

In 2010, the EU announced that 31% of the €5 billion that was earmarked the new (mainly environmental) challenges in agriculture would be spent on protecting and promoting biodiversity in the European countryside. This money is part of the EU rural development policy, which is supporting agri-environmental projects throughout the Member States.

The CAP has furthermore been criticised due to its effect on farmland bird populations. Between 1980 and 2009, the farmland bird population has decreased from 600 million to 300 million, implying a loss of 50%. Among the species that have been hit hardest are the starling and the tree sparrow, which have both declined by 53%. The removal of hedgerows and ploughing over meadows are two significant factors that may have contributed to more efficient farming, but that also caused a decrease in farmland birds' habitats.

In England, farmers have been lauded by the Royal Society for the Protection of Birds because the five most threatened bumblebees have made a comeback to the English nature due to the agri-environmental schemes. In Germany, support for extensive farming and biotope management helps maintain habitat for rare species such as orchids and butterflies. In Hungary, a special scheme was launched to protect the great bustard, maybe the world's heaviest flying bird, which needs areas with minimal disturbance and an abundant supply of insects to breed. In Cyprus, agri-environment schemes support the maintenance of traditional trees and bushes that are a natural habitat for the islands and likely to be of benefit to farmland birds in Cyprus.

Rules instituted in 2015 barring or reducing payments for farmed land above threshold densities of trees or canopy cover have been attacked as having perverse consequences for mature trees, biodiversity, soil erosion and downstream flooding.

The European Court of Auditors raised concerns in 2024 about the lack of alignment between the CAP and EU's climate objectives in the Green Deal.

=== Equity among member states ===
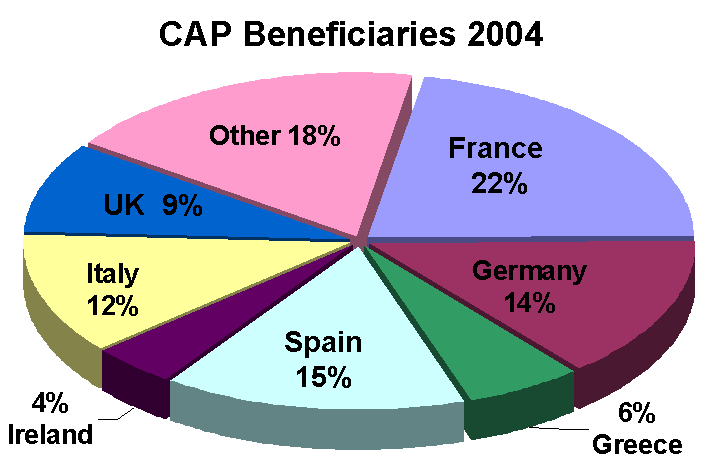
CAP 2004 beneficiaries

Some countries in the EU have larger agricultural sectors than others, notably France and Spain, and consequently receive more money under the CAP. Countries such as the Netherlands and the United Kingdom have particularly urbanised populations and rely very little on agriculture as part of their economy (in the United Kingdom agriculture employs 1.6% of the total workforce and in the Netherlands 2.0%). The UK therefore receives less than half what France gets, despite a similar sized economy and population. Other countries receive more benefit from different areas of the EU budget. Overall, certain countries make net contributions, notably Germany (the largest contribution overall) and the Netherlands (the biggest contribution per person), but also the UK and France. The largest per capita beneficiaries are Greece and Ireland.

Another aspect is difference between older Western European and newer Central and Eastern member states, due to transitional arrangements the latter received smaller payments. In 2013 payments per hectare were 527 euros in Greece and only 89 euros in Latvia. In compensation the newer members were allowed to provide national farm aid. In March 2018 EU agriculture ministers failed to achieve consensus on a declaration about future of CAP, with ministers of Estonia, Latvia, Lithuania, Poland, and Slovakia demanding fully equal subsidies across the union.

=== Cotton subsidies ===
In spite of these declarations, the EU Commission proposed the continuation of cotton subsidies, coupled to production. The coupling of the subsidy means that they will continue to have significant trade-distorting effect, most notably on West African farmers who are unable to compete with subsidised cotton. The Communication on the future of the CAP does not mention the cotton sector. Nevertheless, the most trade-distorting subsidies to cotton production have already been eliminated in the 2004 reform. The current EU cotton production corresponds to 1% of global cotton production and its effect on the evolution of world market prices is therefore negligible. On the other hand, the EU is by far the largest provider of development assistance to cotton. In the framework of the EU-Africa Partnership on Cotton the EU has made available more than €320 million. The EU market for cotton is already duty-free and quota-free and there are no export subsidies for cotton.

=== UK rebate and the CAP ===
The UK would have been contributing more money to the EU than any other EU member state, except that the UK government negotiated a special annual UK rebate in 1984. Due to the way the rebate is funded, France pays the largest share of the rebate (31%), followed by Italy (24%) and Spain (14%).

The discrepancy in CAP funding is a cause of some consternation in the UK. As of 2004, France received more than double the CAP funds received by the UK (see diagram). This is a net benefit to France of €6.37 billion, compared to the UK. This is largely a reflection of the fact that France has more than double the land area of the UK. In comparison, the UK budget rebate for 2005 is scheduled to be approx. €5.5 billion. The popular view in the UK (as, for example, set forth in the tabloid press) is that if the UK rebate were reduced with no change to the CAP, then the UK would be paying money to keep the French farming sector in business – to many people in the UK, this would be seen as unfair.

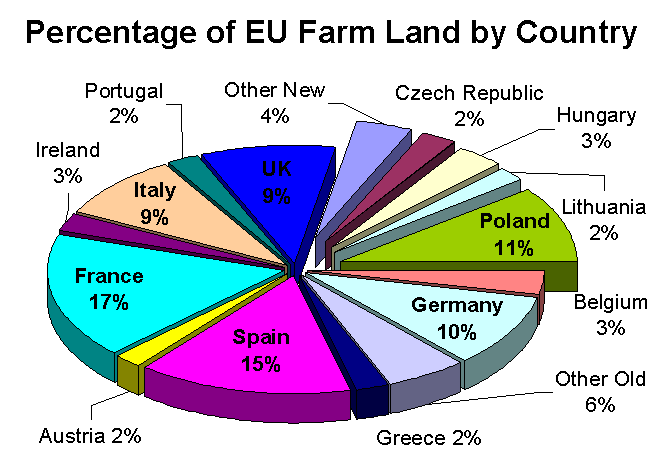
Percentage of EU farmland by country in 2004

If the rebate were removed without changes to the CAP then the UK would pay a net contribution of 14 times that of the French (In 2005 EU budget terms). The UK would make a net contribution of €8.25 billion compared to the current contribution of €2.75 billion, versus a current French net contribution of €0.59 billion.

In December 2005 the UK agreed to give up approximately 20% of the rebate for the period 2007–2013, on condition that the funds did not contribute to CAP payments, were matched by other countries' contributions and were only for the new member states. Spending on the CAP remained fixed, as had previously been agreed. Overall, this reduced the proportion of the budget spent on the CAP. It was agreed that the European Commission should conduct a full review of all EU spending.

=== Economic sustainability ===
Experts such as Prof. Alan Matthews believed 'greening' measures in the EU's proposed €418-billion post-2013 farm policy could lower the bloc's agricultural production potential by raising farm input costs by €5 billion, or around 2 per cent.

=== Target population ===
Only 5.4% of EU's population works on farms, and the farming sector is responsible for 1.6% of the GDP of the EU (2005). The number of European farmers is decreasing every year by 2%. Additionally, most Europeans live in cities, towns, and suburbs, not rural areas.

The 2007-2008 world food price crisis renewed calls for farm subsidies to be removed in light of evidence that farm subsidies contribute to rocketing food prices, which has a particularly detrimental effect on developing countries.

== Origins and history ==
=== Origins ===
In the late 1950s to late 1960s, there was no example of a successful agricultural integration in Europe. There were only a few pre-existing legal stipulations that were considered, "weak, vague and highly underdeveloped". As part of building a common market, tariffs on agricultural products would have to be removed. However, the political clout of farmers, and the sensitivity of the issue in nations that still remembered severe food shortages during and after the Second World War, delayed the CAP and its implementation for many years. Nevertheless, the European Economic Community (EEC) offered an integrated agriculture policy to France, to help France to ratify the Treaty of Rome. In due course, article 39 was created in a set of five social and economic objectives.

The Spaak Report of 1956 stated that a European common market that excluded agriculture was unthinkable. It argued that security of food supply was paramount and raised a series of questions about agriculture that needed to be answered by policy-makers. The Treaty of Rome, signed in March 1957, established the European Economic Community (EEC) and it was mainly due to the French pressure that the Treaty included agriculture. However, due to disagreements within the Six over agricultural policy, the articles on agriculture were vague and policy making was left until after the Treaty had been signed.

Article 39.1 of the Treaty set out the objectives of the CAP: to increase productivity through technical progress and the best use of the factors of production (such as labour); to ensure a fair standard of living for communities employed in agriculture; to stabilise markets; to secure the availability of supplies; and to enforce fair prices. Article 39.2 stated that policy makers must take into account three factors: the circumstances of each agricultural activity due to the social structure of agricultural communities and the inequalities between richer and poorer regions; the need to act gradually to allow agriculture sufficient time to adjust; and to remember that agriculture was heavily integrated in the wider economy.

Article 40 provided for the common organisation of markets and common prices, along with a fund to pay for it. Article 41 allowed for the introduction of additional measures to implement Article 39, such as the co-ordination of vocational education and research, the "dissemination of agricultural knowledge" and the encouragement of consumption of certain goods. Article 42 allowed the Council of the Community to decide how far the regulations on competition could apply to agriculture. This Article also allowed them to grant aid.

During 3–12 July 1958 in Stresa, the Community held an agricultural conference attended by agricultural ministers from member states and the President of the European Commission, Walter Hallstein, along with observers representing agriculture. Three working parties at the conference investigated: the current state of agriculture and the agricultural policies of member states; the short-term effects of the implementation of the Rome Treaty; and the long-term aims of the CAP. In a speech to the conference, Hallstein complained of urbanisation that was leading to rural depopulation and he lamented the "clash of cultures" in which rural life and rural values were considered inferior. Hallstein also reflected on the Cold War threat from communism:

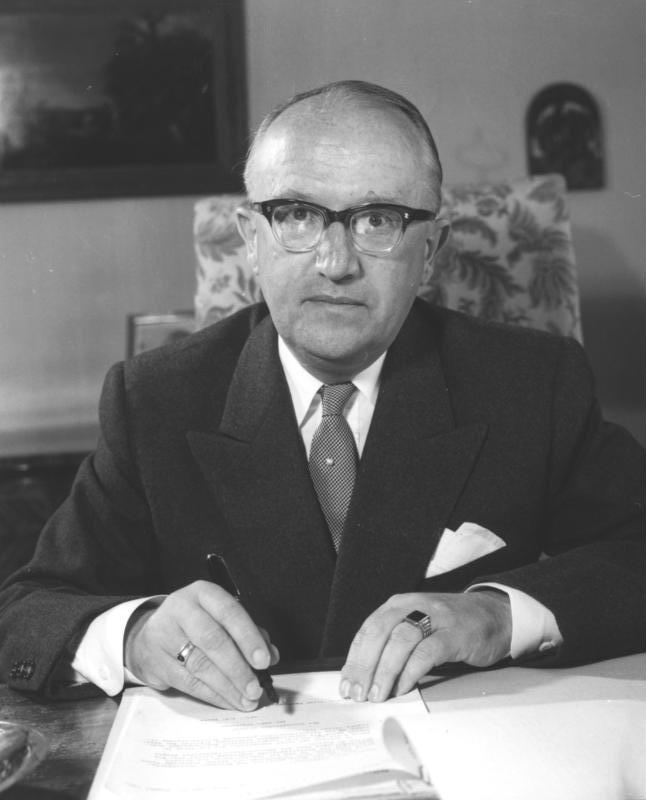
Walter Hallstein, President of the European Commission during the CAP's formative years

It is the core of Europe's achievements which is under threat: a whole civilisation which rests on the inalienable freedom and dignity of the individual...this tragedy of liberty is also a tragedy of the rural class. Let us look around us, and, alas, we have not far to look; the rural class is its first victim. It is for this reason that we are convinced that the European rural class will count among the most trustworthy pillars of our unified European market. Because its fate is also at stake, and is one of the first threatened. In this room there is no one whose family tree doesn't reach back, sooner or later, to farming roots. We know what the rural class means to Europe, not only through its economic values, but also by its moral and social values.

The conference's Final Resolution argued for the vital importance of agriculture in economic and social life and expressed their unanimous wish to preserve the character of European farming, which was predominately based on small-size, family holdings. They agreed that it was necessary to help these farms increase their economic capacity and competitiveness. They also advocated structural changes to rationalise and cheapen production, which was intended to improve productivity. The Resolution also included a commitment to a price policy.

Therefore, during 1958–1959, the Commission drafted the CAP and the Assembly commissioned reports into agriculture. The Commission submitted draft proposals in November 1959 (which were debated in the Assembly and by the Economic and Social Committee) and its final report in June 1960. In December the Council agreed to a system of import levies (for grain, sugar, pork, eggs and poultry) and to commodity regimes for agricultural produce. They also introduced the principle of Community Preference in the implementation of the levies and for the negotiation of commercial treaties with outside countries; this ensured that any trade concession granted to an outside country could not weaken the European producer in the Community market.

=== Initial years ===
In 1962 the European Agricultural Guidance and Guarantee Fund was founded to provide money for the CAP's market regimes. A year later, two arms of the Fund were established, the Guarantee side implemented market and price support and the Guidance part supplied structural aid. A Community regulation of 1964 provided detailed arrangements for the working of the Fund, including for estimating export refunds, the Community's main tool for controlling the market. Market regimes had been implemented for most agricultural produce by the end of the decade. An agreement in 1966 facilitated the completion of the single market for agriculture (which came into effect a year later), a single price support system and uniform protection against imports from outside countries. Hallstein hailed this agreement as the single most important stage in forging European unity because it helped to complete the CAP.

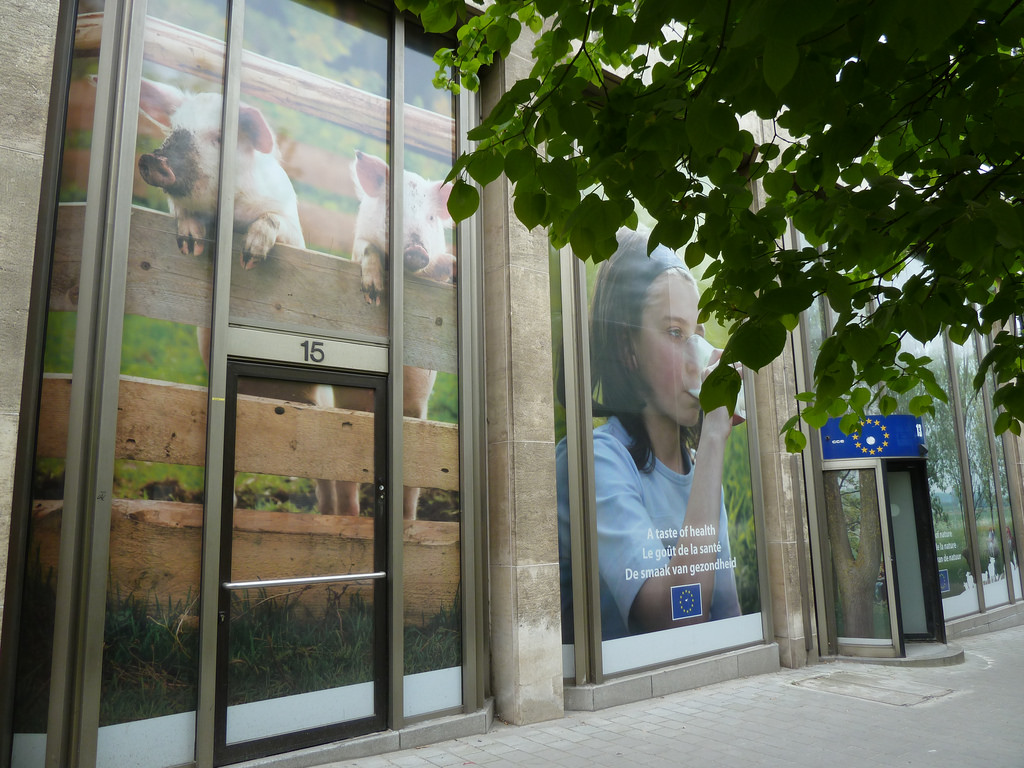
Directorate-General for Agriculture and Rural Development in Brussels

The six member states individually strongly intervened in their agricultural sectors, in particular with regard to what was produced, maintaining prices for goods and how farming was organised. The intervention posed an obstacle to free trade in goods while the rules continued to differ from state to state since freedom of trade would contradict the intervention policies. Some members, particularly France, and all farming professional organisations wanted to maintain strong state intervention in agriculture. That could not be achieved unless policies were harmonised and transferred to the European Community level.

By 1962, three major principles had been established to guide the CAP: market unity, community preference and financial solidarity. Since then, the CAP has been a central element in the European institutional system.

In June 1965 negotiations on the CAP came to halt in Brussels when the French delegation of the EEC, under the direction of Charles de Gaulle, decided to pull out of further discussion on the use of foreign levies and national budgets to support a budget for the Community. This was known as the Empty Chair Crisis. Talks resumed after January 1966, but the issue of the Community's own resources was only finalised three years later in the agricultural marathon 19–22 December 1969 when the Council adopted that agricultural levies would be allocated to the Community in their entirety and customs duties would be allocated progressively to the Community, in order to avoid excessive disruption of national budgets.

=== Early attempts at reform (Mansholt Plan) ===
On 21 December 1968, Sicco Mansholt, the European Commissioner for Agriculture, sent a memorandum to the Council of Ministers concerning agricultural reform in the European Community. This long-term plan, also known as the '1980 Agricultural Programme' or the 'Report of the Gaichel Group', named after the village in Luxembourg in which it had been prepared, laid the foundations for a new social and structural policy for European agriculture.

The Mansholt Plan noted the limits to a policy of price and market support. It predicted the imbalance that would occur in certain markets unless the Community undertook to reduce its land under cultivation by at least five million hectares. Mansholt also noted that the standard of living of farmers had not improved since the implementation of the CAP despite an increase in production and permanent increases in Community expenditure. He, therefore, suggested that production methods should be reformed and modernised and that small farms, which were bound to disappear sooner or later, according to Community experts, should be increased in size. The aim of the Plan was to encourage nearly five million farmers to give up farming. That would make it possible to redistribute their land and increase the size of the remaining family farms. Farms were considered viable if they could guarantee for their owners an average annual income comparable to that of all the other workers in the region. In addition to vocational training measures, Mansholt also provided for welfare programmes to cover retraining and early retirement. Finally, he called on the Member States to limit direct aid to unprofitable farms.

Faced with the increasingly angry reaction of the agricultural community, Mansholt was soon forced to reduce the scope of some of his proposals. Ultimately, the Mansholt Plan was reduced to just three European directives, which, in 1972, concerned the modernisation of agricultural holdings, the cessation of certain agricultural activity and the training of farmers.

=== Between Mansholt and MacSharry ===
Hurt by the failure of Mansholt, would-be reformers were mostly absent throughout the 1970s, and reform proposals were few and far between. A system called "Agrimoney" was introduced as part of the fledgling EMU project but was deemed a failure and did not stimulate further reforms.

The 1980s was the decade that saw the first true reforms of the CAP, foreshadowing further development from 1992 onwards. The influence of the farming bloc declined, and with it, reformers were emboldened. Environmentalists garnered great support in reforming the CAP, but it was financial matters that ultimately tipped the balance: due to huge overproduction the CAP was becoming expensive and wasteful. There was the introduction of a quota on dairy production in 1984 and, in 1988, a ceiling on EU expenditure to farmers. However, the basis of the CAP remained in place and it was not until 1992 that CAP reformers began to work in earnest.

=== Modern reforms ===
The current reform issues in EU agriculture are: lowering prices, ensuring food safety and quality, and guaranteeing stability of farmers' incomes. Other issues are environmental pollution, animal welfare and finding alternative income opportunities for farmers. Some of these issues are the responsibility of the member states.

==== The MacSharry reforms (1992) ====
In 1992, the MacSharry reforms (named after the European Commissioner for Agriculture, Ray MacSharry) were created to limit rising production, while at the same time adjusting to the trend toward a more free agricultural market. The reforms reduced levels of support by 29% for cereals and 16% for beef. They also created 'set-aside' payments to withdraw land from production, payments to limit stocking levels, and introduced measures to encourage retirement and afforestation.

Since the MacSharry reforms, cereal prices have been closer to the equilibrium level, there is greater transparency in costs of agricultural support and the 'decoupling' of income support from production support has begun. However, the administrative complexity involved was seen as inviting fraud, and the associated problems of the CAP were far from being corrected.

One of the factors behind the 1992 reforms was the need to reach agreement with the EU's external trade partners at the Uruguay Round of the General Agreement on Tariffs and Trade (GATT) talks with regards to agricultural subsidies.

==== Agenda 2000 (1999) ====
The 'Agenda 2000' reforms divided the CAP into two 'Pillars': production support and rural development. Several rural development measures were introduced including diversification, setting up producer groups and support for young farmers. Agri-environment schemes became compulsory for every Member State. The market support prices for cereals, milk and milk products and beef and veal were step-wise reduced while direct coupled payments to farmers were increased. Payments for major arable crops as cereals and oil-seeds were harmonised.

The introduction of the euro in 1999 also ended the use of green exchange rates such as the green pound.

==== European Commission Report and decoupling (2003) ====
A 2003 report, commissioned by the European Commission, by a group of experts led by Belgian economist André Sapir stated that the budget structure was a "historical relic". The report suggested a reconsideration of EU policy, redirecting expenditure towards measures intended to increase wealth creation and cohesion of the EU. As a significant proportion of the budget is currently spent on agriculture and there is little prospect of the budget being increased, that would require reducing CAP expenditure. The report largely concerned itself to discussing alternative measures more useful to the EU, rather than discussing the CAP, but it also suggested that farm aid would be administered more effectively by member countries on an individual basis.

The report's findings were largely ignored. Instead, CAP spending was kept within the remit of the EU, and France led an effort to agree a fixed arrangement for CAP spending that would not be changed until 2012. It was made possible by advance agreement with Germany. It is that agreement that the UK currently wishes to see reopened, both in its efforts to defend the UK position on the UK rebate and also given that the UK is in favour of lowering barriers to entry for developing nations that are agricultural exporters.

On 26 June 2003, EU farm ministers adopted a fundamental reform of the CAP, based on "decoupling" subsidies from particular crops. (Member states could choose to maintain a limited amount of specific subsidy.) The new "single farm payments" were subject to "cross-compliance" conditions relating to environmental, food safety and animal welfare standards. Many of them were already either good practice recommendations or separate legal requirements regulating farm activities. The aim was to make more money available for environmental quality or animal welfare programmes. The political scientist Peter Nedergaard analysed the 2003 reform on the basis of rational choice theory and stated that, "In order to arrive at an adequate explanation, an account of the policy entrepreneurship on the part of Commissioner Franz Fischler must be given."

Details of the UK scheme were still being decided at its introductory date of May 2005. Details of the scheme in each member country could be varied subject to outlines issued by the EU. In England, the Single Payment Scheme provided a single flat rate payment of around £230 per hectare for maintaining land in cultivatable condition. In Scotland, payments were based on a historical basis and could vary widely. This scheme allowed for much wider non-production use of land that might still receive the environmental element of the support. Additional payments were available if land was managed in a prescribed environmental manner.

The overall EU and national budgets for subsidy were capped. That prevented the EU being required to spend more on the CAP than its limited budget.

The reforms entered into force in 2004–2005. (Member states could apply for a transitional period delaying the reform in their country to 2007 and phasing in reforms until 2012)

==== Sugar regime reform (2005–2006) ====
One of the crops subsidised by the CAP was sugar produced from sugar beet; the EU was by far the largest sugar beet producer in the world, with annual production at 17 million metric tons in 2017. That compared to levels produced by Brazil and India, the two largest producers of sugar from sugar cane.

Sugar was to be included in the 1992 MacSherry reform or in the 1999 Agenda 2000 decisions; sugar was also subject to a phase in (to 2009) under the Everything but Arms trade deal giving tariff- and quota-free market access to least developed countries. As of 21 February 2006, the EU decided to reduce the guaranteed price of sugar by 36% over four years, starting in 2006. European production was projected to fall sharply. According to the EU, this was the first serious reform of sugar under the CAP for 40 years. Under the Sugar Protocol to the Lome Convention, nineteen ACP countries export sugar to the EU and would be affected by price reductions on the EU market.

These proposals followed the WTO Appellate Body, largely upholding on 28 April 2005 the initial decision against the EU sugar regime.

The EU abolished sugar quotas in September 2017.

==== Reform package 2014 ====
In 2010 the European Commission discussed the next reform of the CAP, which would coincide with the next financial perspectives package, as from 2014. The Commissioner responsible for Agriculture and Rural Development Dacian Cioloş, outlined seven major challenges that the future CAP needed to address: food production, globalisation, the environment, economic issues, a territorial approach, diversity and simplification. The cited reasons for reform plans included:

- a need to respond to the economic, environmental and territorial challenges faced by agricultural and rural areas today and in the future, and in doing so to better align the CAP to the Europe 2020 strategy for smart, sustainable and inclusive growth.
- a need to make the policy more efficient and effective, as well as to further simplify it while maintaining sound financial management and controllability
- making CAP support more equitable and balanced between Member States and farmers and better targeted at active farmers.

The Commission launched the CAP reform process with an extensive public debate on the future of the Cap between April and June 2010, followed by a public conference in July 2010, with around 600 participants. The purpose of the debate was to have different sectors of society taking part. "The Common Agricultural Policy is not just a matter for experts. It's a policy for all Europeans", said Commissioner Cioloş. Based on the wide-ranging public debate, on 18 November 2010, the Commission presented a Communication on "The CAP towards 2020" The Communication Paper outlined three options for the future CAP and launched a consultation with other institutions and stakeholders. Over 500 contributions were received, 44% of which came from the farming and processing sector. These contributions form an integral part of the Impact Assessment of the legal proposals. The impact assessment evaluates alternative scenarios for the evolution of the policy on the basis of extensive quantitative and qualitative analysis

On 12 October 2011 the Commission presented a set of legal proposals to reform the common agricultural policy (CAP) after 2013. Its stated aim is to guarantee European citizens healthy and quality food production, while preserving the environment. According to the proposal, the three broad objectives of the future CAP are: "Viable food production", "Sustainable management of natural resources" and "Balanced territorial development", which respond directly to the economic, environmental and territorial balance challenges identified in the Communication and which guide the proposed changes to the CAP instruments.

The Lisbon Treaty, which came into force on 1 December 2009, has extended the legislative powers of the European Parliament on agricultural matters, with the EP deciding together with the Council in a procedure known as the co-decision procedure. For the first time both institutions (European Parliament and the council) decided on an equal footing on the new agriculture legislative package. The European Parliament and the council, debated the text. The approval of the different regulations and implementing acts was received by mid-2013. On 26 June 2013 agreement was reached between the European Commission, the Council and the EU Parliament on a new CAP. The CAP reform came into force as from 1 January 2014.

===== New design of direct payments =====
Direct payments contribute to keeping farming in place throughout the EU territory by supporting and stabilizing farmers' income, thereby ensuring the longer-term economic viability of farms and making them less vulnerable to fluctuations in prices. They also provide basic public goods through their link with cross compliance.

The legal proposals aim to move away from the different systems of the Single Payments Scheme in the EU-15 (which allows for historical references, or a payment per hectare, or a "hybrid" combination of the two) and the Single Area Payments Scheme (SAPS) in most of the EU-12, a new "Basic Payment Scheme" will apply after 2013. This will be subject to "cross compliance" (respecting certain environmental, animal welfare & other rules), as at present, although there are various simplifications to the current requirement. It intends to reduce significantly the discrepancies between the levels of payments obtained between farmers, between regions and between Member States. All Member States will be obliged to move towards a uniform payment per hectare at national or regional level by the start of 2019. In line with the Commission proposals within the Multi-Annual Financial Framework, the national envelopes for direct payments will be adjusted so that those that receive less than 90% of the EU average payment per hectare will receive more. The gap between the amounts currently foreseen and 90% of the EU-27 average is reduced by one-third.

The reform of direct payments was intended to make them better suited with regard to:

- "Greening": The legal proposals propose new concepts. Among them is the "greening" of direct payment. To strengthen the environmental sustainability of agriculture and enhance the efforts of farmers, the Commission is proposing to spend 30% of direct payments specifically for the improved use of natural resources. Farmers would be obliged to fulfill certain criteria such as crop diversification, maintenance of permanent pasture, the preservation of environmental reservoirs and landscapes.
- Young farmers: To attract young people (under 40 years) into the farming business, the Commission is proposing that the Basic Payment to new entrant Young Farmers should be topped up by an additional 25% for the first 5 years of installation.
- Small farmers: Any farmer wishing to participate in the Small Farmers Scheme will receive an annual payment fixed by the Member State of between €500 and €1,000, regardless of the farm's size. (The figure will either be linked to the average payment per beneficiary, or the national average payment per hectare for 3 ha.). Participants will face less stringent cross-compliance requirements, and be exempt from greening.
- Active farmers: This new definition is aimed to exclude payments to applicants who exercise no real or tangible agricultural activity on their land. The Commission is proposing that payments would not be granted to applicants whose CAP direct payments are less than 5% of total receipts from all non-agricultural activities. This doesn't apply to farmers who receive less than €5,000 in direct payments.
- "Capping": In the autumn of 2007 the European Commission was reported to be considering a proposal to limit subsidies to individual landowners and factory farms to around £300,000. Some factory farms and large estates would be affected in the UK, as there are over 20 farms/estates receiving £500,000 or more from the EU. Similar attempts have been unsuccessful in the past and were opposed in the UK by two strong lobbying organisations the Country Land and Business Association and the National Farmers Union. Germany, which had large collective farms still in operation in what was East Germany, also vigorously opposed changes marketed as "reforms". The proposal was reportedly submitted for consultation with EU member states on 20 November 2007. In the finally adopted rules, the amount of support that any individual farm can receive will be limited to €300,000 per year. However, to take employment into account, the holding can deduct the costs of salaries in the previous year (including taxes & social security contributions) before these reductions are applied. The funds "saved" will be transferred to the Rural Development envelope in the given country.
- Cross compliance: All payments will continue to be linked to the respect of a number of baseline requirements relating to environment, animal welfare and plant & animal health standards. However, cross compliance will be greatly simplified.

== See also ==
- Common Fisheries Policy – EU fisheries policy
- Agriculture and Fisheries Council – Configuration of the Council of the European Union
- Directorate-General for Agriculture and Rural Development
- European Commissioner for Agriculture and Rural Development – Member of the EU Commission
- European Parliament Committee on Agriculture and Rural Development
- European Union Association Agreement – Treaty between the European Union, its member states, and a non-EU country
- Environmental effects of soybean imports to EU – Legume grown for its edible bean
- Land Allocation Decision Support System
- Spanish Agricultural Guarantee Fund
- Protected Geographical Status – Protected names and designations
- United States farm bill – Primary agricultural and food policy instrument of the federal government
