= Food Information and Control Agency =

Spanish government agency

- Agencia de Información y Control Alimentarios
- Logotype

Agency overview
- Formed: September 16, 1988; 37 years ago
- Jurisdiction: Spain
- Headquarters: Madrid, Spain
- Employees: 91 (2024)
- Annual budget: € 9.3 million, 2025
- Agency executive: Gema Hernández Maroñas, Director
- Parent agency: Ministry of Agriculture, Fisheries and Food
- Website: www.aica.gob.es

The Food Information and Control Agency (Spanish: Agencia de Información y Control Alimentarios, AICA), known between 1988 and 2014 as the Olive Oil Agency, is the Spanish Department of Agriculture, Fisheries and Food autonomous agency responsible for managing the information and control systems of the olericulture, dairy and other markets that the Ministry determines; the control of compliance with the Food Chain Improvement Act of 2013 and the official control of Protected Designations of Origin and Geographical Indications whose territorial scope extends to more than one autonomous community, before the commercialization.

== History ==
=== Origins: olive oil ===
The origin of the AICA is in 1987. This year, Law 28/1987, of December 11, was approved by the Cortes Generales, which created a new public agency: the Agency for Olive Oil (AAO). This brief regulation created the new body based on the European mandates provided for in Regulations 2262/1984, of the Council, of July 17, and 27/1985, of the Commission, of January 4, which establishes the need for Member States to create autonomous control agencies for the aid granted to the olive oil sector. It was attached to the Ministry of Agriculture, Fisheries and Food and its director had the organic level of deputy director-general. In September 1988, its Statute was approved, which put the AAO into operation.

=== Food Chain Act: agency reform ===
In 2013, the Law on measures to improve the functioning of the food chain (Food Chain Act) was approved, and the first additional provision of this law transformed the Agency for Olive Oil into the Food Information and Control Agency (AICA) after expanding its functions not only to the olive markets that it already supervised, but also to others such as dairy, wine and any other that was assigned to it.. The renewed agency began to perform his de facto functions on January 1, 2014 and its internal rules were approved in April 2014.

Following protests from the primary sector in 2020, the minister of Agriculture, Luis Planas, pledged, among other things, to strengthen the Agency to ensure compliance with the Food Chain Act. As a result of this commitment, at the end of 2020 the Ministry presented a budget for 2021 with an increase of two million euros compared to the 2018 budget (still in force in 2020), an increase of almost 32%.

In the same vein, in December 2021 the Cortes Generales approved an amendment of the Food Chain Act. With regard to the AICA, on the one hand, it was granted full authority to access the digital registry in which the food contracts signed with the primary producers and their groups, as well as their modifications, are registered to carry out the pertinent checks within the scope of their powers. On the other hand, with the aim of promoting efficiency in management and legal certainty, the decision-making power about minor pecuniary sanctions (when they do not exceed 100,000 euros) is transferred from the Director-General for the Food Industry (today Director-General for Food) to the Director of the Food Information and Control Agency.

Likewise, the 2021 law declares AICA as the National Execution Authority, being the highest national body responsible for ensuring compliance with the Food Chain Act and the contact point between Spain and the European Commission for these matters.

== Organization chart ==
The Agency is structured through an executive body and an advisory body:

- The executive body of the agency is the Director of the Food Information and Control Agency. The director has the rank of deputy director-general and he or she heads the agency and, as such, it directs and represents it.
  - The Secretary-General, responsible for the management of human resources, internal regime, legal regime, financial and economic regime and the management and maintenance of the State Register of Good Commercial Practices in Food Contracting.
  - The Technical Unit for Market Information and Inspection, which is responsible for obtaining data and its analysis and processing, as well as the planning and execution of the controls and the evaluation of its results.
  - The Technical Unit for Monitoring the Chain, which is responsible for monitoring, evaluation and control of food contracts and commercial practices in the food chain, as well as the promotion of fair business practices.
- The advisory body is the Advisory Council, a collective organ composed by representatives from the General State Administration, from the Autonomous Communities and from those actors of the food chain who are interested, including consumers.
  - The Chairperson of the Advisory Council is the Secretary-General for Agrarian Resources and Food Security and the Deputy Chair is the Director-General for Food, both officials from the Ministry.
  - Among the members of the council, there is the director of the Agency and representatives from the departments of Agriculture, Economy, Finance, from the Spanish Agency for Food Safety and Nutrition, from the National Commission on Markets and Competition and from cooperatives, associations and other social organizations, of the autonomous communities and of the Spanish Council on Consumers and Users.

== List of directors ==
Since the agency's creation in 1988, these are the persons who held the position of director:

1. Vicente Fernández Lobato (1988–1995)
2. Julio Blanco Gómez (1995–1997)
3. Álvaro González Coloma Pascua (1997–2003)
4. Valentín Almansa Sahagún (2003–2004)
5. Carlos Sánchez Laín (2004–2013)
6. José Miguel Herrero (2014–2018)
7. Gema Hernández Maroñas (2018–)
