= European Structural and Investment Funds =

European Union financial tools

The European Structural and Investment Funds (ESI Funds, ESIFs) are financial tools governed by a common rulebook, set up to implement the regional policy of the European Union, as well as the structural policy pillars of the Common Agricultural Policy and the Common Fisheries Policy. They aim to reduce regional disparities in income, wealth and opportunities. Europe's poorer regions receive most of the support, but all European regions are eligible for funding under the policy's various funds and programmes. The current framework is set for a period of seven years, from 2021 to 2027.

== Overview ==
Five ESIFs currently exist:

- under the Cohesion Policy:
  - the European Regional Development Fund (ERDF)
  - the Cohesion Fund (CF)
  - the European Social Fund Plus (ESF+)
  - the Just Transition Fund (JTF)
- under the Common Agricultural Policy (CAP):
  - the European Agricultural Fund for Rural Development (EAFRD)
  - the European Agricultural Guarantee Fund (EAGF);
- under the Common Fisheries Policy (CFP):
  - the European Maritime, Fisheries and Aquaculture Fund (EMFAF)

ESIFs constitute the majority of total EU spending; nearly half of all ESIF allocations are realised as expenditure in the "real economy" through third party purchases, and are among the largest items of the budget of the European Union. Apart from them, there are also other EU funds that contribute to regional development, in particular the European Agricultural Guarantee Fund (EAGF), the Just Transition Fund, the Connecting Europe Facility, the LIFE programme, the InvestEU Programme, Horizon Europe and Erasmus+.

It is up to the European Parliament and the Council of the European Union to define the tasks, priorities and organisation of the Structural Funds (the Regional Policy framework), through the ordinary legislative procedure and consulting the Economic and Social Committee and the Committee of the Regions (leading to the publication of Regulations).

The key indicator for the division of regions into objectives is the Gross National Product per capita (GNP p.c.). This criterion is criticised on the ground that it does not reflect the socio-economic reality of regions. Some groups (e.g. Beyond GDP) propose the creation of a set of different indicators.

=== Fund management ===
The way the ESIFs are spent is based on a system of shared responsibility between the European Commission and the member state authorities:

- The Commission negotiates and approves each member states's National Strategic Reference Framework (NSRF) and operational programmes (OPs), and uses these as a basis for allocating resources.
- The member states and their regions manage the programmes. This includes implementing the OPs by selecting individual projects, controlling and assessing them.
- The commission is involved in overall programme monitoring, pays out approved expenditure and verifies the national control systems.

Prior to 1989, funding decisions were taken by the European Commission. This was followed by a period where EU member states tried to maximize control, with little systematic project appraisal and a focus on a small number of large projects. Since 1994 more systematic, co-ordinated and complex methods of allocating resources have been introduced. For example, most funds within the 2004–06 Integrated Regional Operational Programme (IROP), and its 2007–13 successor (ROP), are allocated through largely need-based project-selection mechanisms. Regions with low GDP receive more funds. However, within these regions, more funds go to relatively rich local areas with the best institutions. It has been argued that part of this can be explained by the frequent need to co-fund projects, and the needed capacity to prepare applications.

== The ESI Funds ==
=== The European Regional Development Fund (ERDF) ===
The ERDF supports programmes addressing regional development, economic change, enhanced competitiveness and territorial co-operation throughout the EU. Funding priorities include modernising economic structures, creating sustainable jobs and economic growth, research and innovation, environmental protection and risk prevention. Investment in infrastructure also retains an important role, especially in the least-developed regions.

=== The European Social Fund Plus (ESF+) ===
The ESF+ focuses on four key areas: increasing the adaptability of workers and enterprises, enhancing access to employment and participation in the labour market, reinforcing social inclusion by combating discrimination and facilitating access to the labour market for disadvantaged people, and promoting partnership for reform in the fields of employment and inclusion.

=== The Cohesion Fund ===
The Cohesion Fund contributes to interventions in the field of the environment and trans-European transport networks. For the 2021–2027 programming period, it provides support to member states whose gross national income per capita falls below 90% of the EU-27 average. The fifteen member states receiving support under this criterion are Bulgaria, Czechia, Estonia, Greece, Croatia, Cyprus, Latvia, Lithuania, Hungary, Malta, Poland, Portugal, Romania, Slovakia and Slovenia.

=== The European Agricultural Fund for Rural Development (EAFRD) ===
The EAFRD constitutes the second pillar of the Common Agricultural Policy (CAP), financing the EU's contribution to sustainable development of rural areas. For the 2021–2027 multiannual financial framework, the fund received a total allocation of €95.5 billion, an amount that includes €8.1 billion drawn from the NextGenerationEU recovery instrument to address challenges arising from the COVID-19 pandemic. The fund operates through three enduring goals: strengthening agricultural and forestry competitiveness, ensuring the sustainable stewardship of natural resources while addressing climate change, and promoting even territorial growth across rural economies and the communities within them. From 2023 onwards, EAFRD spending is delivered through national CAP Strategic Plans drawn up by each member state in line with nine specific objectives established under Regulation (EU) 2021/2115.

=== The European Maritime, Fisheries and Aquaculture Fund (EMFAF) ===
The EMFAF covers the period 2021 to 2027 and finances the implementation of the Common Fisheries Policy, the EU's maritime policy, and the Union's engagement in international ocean governance. The fund backs innovative projects aimed at the sustainable use and management of aquatic and maritime resources, and supports such priorities as the transition to low-carbon fishing, the protection of marine biodiversity, the economic and social vitality of coastal communities, and maritime security. The fund's total allocation for 2021–2027 is €6.108 billion. Management is divided between two modes: €5.311 billion is administered through national programmes co-financed by the EU and member states, while €797 million is managed directly by the Commission.

== Objectives for 2007–2013 ==
Sections below present information about objectives that have been defined for the programming period, which runs from 1 January 2007 to 31 December 2013. The overall budget for this period is €347bn: €201bn for the European Regional Development Fund, €76bn for the European Social Fund, and €70bn for the Cohesion Fund. The objectives setup shapes the main focus of interventions (eligible activities and costs) and the overall allocations of funds from the EU budget.

=== Convergence objective (formerly Objective 1) ===
This objective covers regions whose GDP per capita is below 75% of the EU average and aims at accelerating their economic development. It is financed by the ERDF, the ESF and the Cohesion Fund. The priorities under this objective are human and physical capital, innovation, knowledge society, environment and administrative efficiency. The budget allocated to this objective is €283.3bn in current prices.

=== Regional Competitiveness and Employment objective (formerly Objective 2) ===
This objective covers all regions of the EU territory, except those already covered by the Convergence objective. It aims at reinforcing competitiveness, employment and attractiveness of these regions. Innovation, the promotion of entrepreneurship and environment protection are the main themes of this objective. The funding – €55bn in current prices – comes from the ERDF and the ESF.

=== European Territorial Cooperation objective (formerly Objective 3) ===
European Territorial Cooperation is an objective of the European Union's Cohesion Policy for the period 2007–2013, serving its ultimate goal to strengthen the economic and social cohesion of the Union. Regions and cities from different Member States are encouraged to work together, learning from each other and developing joint projects and networks. With the Convergence Objective and the Regional Competitiveness and Employment Objective it aims at contributing to reduce regional disparities across Union's territory.

The EUR 8.7 billion allocated to the European Territorial Cooperation objective represents 2.5% of the total budget for Cohesion Policy in 2007–2013 and is financed by the European Regional Development Fund (ERDF). It supports cross-border, transnational and interregional cooperation programmes, helping Member States to participate in European Union (EU) external border cooperation programmes supported by other instruments (Instrument for Pre-Accession and European Neighbourhood Policy Instrument).

==== History ====
The European Territorial Cooperation Objective replaced the previous INTERREG Community Initiative (in the period 2000–2006) and thus many European Territorial Cooperation programmes bear the name INTERREG.

The "objectives" were introduced with the Single European Act as a criterion to make the Structural Funds spending more effective as Regional Policy started to be rationalised in a perspective of economic and social cohesion. The Single European Act, that entered into force in 1987, institutionalised the goal of completing the internal market with a total borders opening, by 31 December 1992. Regional competition would be tighter and a Cohesion Policy was needed to mitigate the negative side effects of market unification.

The "objectives" were then created to discipline the capture of funds in terms of economic and social cohesion across the Union's territory. In the first multiannual financial framework, 1988–1999, there were seven objectives, which have been progressively reduced.

Even though European Territorial Cooperation Objective is the smallest of the three Cohesion Policy objectives (in terms of budget), it gained a critical importance to address the key challenges of the European Union, particularly with some redefinitions of the Treaty of Lisbon (entered into force on 1 December 2009), and for contributing to achieve the goals of Europe 2020, the EU's growth strategy.

==== Institutional and legal framework ====
In its title on Economic, Social and Territorial Cohesion, the Treaty on the Functioning of the European Union establishes that 'the Union shall develop and pursue its actions leading to the strengthening of its economic, social and territorial cohesion'. By introducing the concept of territorial cohesion, the Treaty of Lisbon recognised a strong territorial dimension for the cohesion policy. This territorial approach requires a unique and modern governance system, combining different levels of government (European, national, regional and local).

Member States thus conduct their economic policies and coordinate them for the promotion of the 'economic, social and territorial cohesion'. European Territorial Cooperation is a component of the economic policy framework of the Union.

The current Regional Policy framework, sustained by Structural Funds, is set for a period of seven years, from 2007 to 2013. For this period, the following regulations (and the changes in detail made to them by means of subsequent regulations) are especially important in defining the organisation of European Territorial Cooperation:

- Regulation (EC) No 1080/2006 of the European Parliament and of the Council of 5 July 2006 on the European Regional Development Fund and repealing Regulation (EC) No 1783/1999.
- Council Regulation (EC) No 1083/2006 of 11 July 2006 laying down general provisions on the European Regional Development Fund, the European Social Fund and the Cohesion Fund and repealing Regulation (EC) No 1260/1999.
- Commission Regulation (EC) No 1828/2006 of 8 December 2006, setting out rules for the implementation of Council Regulation (EC) No 1083/2006, laying down general provisions on the European Regional Development Fund, the European Social Fund and the Cohesion Fund and of Regulation (EC) No 1080/2006 of the European Parliament and of the Council on the European Regional Development Fund.

The European Territorial Cooperation Objective is financed by the European Regional Development Fund, whereas the remaining two objectives of the Cohesion Policy set for the 2007–2013 period are also financed by the European Social Fund (Regional Competitiveness and Employment Objective), and, in the case with the Convergence Objective, also the Cohesion Fund.

==== Organization ====
As with the remaining two objectives, the European Territorial Cooperation Objective is delivered by means of multi-annual programmes aligned on the Union's objectives and priorities, expressed on the multi-annual financial framework.

Each programme has a managing authority and a Joint Technical Secretariat, headquartered within the area it serves. They are responsible for the correct implementation of the programme, both from a financial and from an operational perspective.

Within European Territorial Cooperation, there are three types of programmes:

- Cross-border cooperation (53 programmes): These programmes help transform regions located on either side of internal or external borders of the European Union into strong economic and social poles. The main goals of these programmes are to face common problems and mitigate the negative effects of administrative, legal and physical barriers of borders. The cooperation process is stressed through joint management of programmes and projects that stimulate mutual trust and understanding.

In particular, cross-border actions are encouraged in the fields of entrepreneurship, improving joint management of natural resources, supporting links between urban and rural areas, improving access to transport and communication networks, developing joint use of infrastructure, administrative cooperation and capacity building, employment, community interaction, culture and social affairs.

- Transnational Cooperation (13 programmes): The transnational programmes promote cooperation among greater European regions, including the ones surrounding sea basins (e.g. Baltic Sea Region, North Sea, Mediterranean and Atlantic Area) or mountain ranges (e.g. Alpine Space), and facilitate coordinated strategic responses to joint challenges, such as flood management, transport and communication corridors, international business and research linkages, urban development and others. Special attention is given to outermost and island regions (e.g. Indian Ocean, Caribbean Area or Northern Periphery).
- The interregional cooperation programme (INTERREG IVC) and three networking programmes (URBACT II, INTERACT II and ESPON) cover all 27 Member States of the Union (and, in some cases, also the cross-border cooperation programmes within the Instrument for Pre-Accession and the European Neighbourhood Policy Instrument, as well as cross-border cooperation with third countries, such as Norway and Switzerland).

Together and in their specific fields, these programmes provide a framework for exchanging experience between regional and local bodies in different countries. The Instrument for Pre-Accession and the European Neighbourhood Policy Instrument are the two financial instruments dedicated to support territorial cooperation between European Member States border regions and their neighbours in accession countries and in other partner countries of the Union. The former currently finances 10 programmes and the latter 13 programmes.

=== fi-compass ===
fi-compass is an advisory service platform provided by the European Commission in collaboration with the European Investment Bank Group. It offers access to publications, learning tools, and tailored advisory services related to financial instruments under the EU shared management funds. These financial instruments, including loans, guarantees, equity, and other risk-sharing mechanisms, support various projects across the European Union. fi-compass provides essential information for managing authorities, financial intermediaries, and any stakeholder interested in EU shared management financial instruments.

== Strategic approach for 2007–2013 ==
This section explains the interplay between different political levels – European, national and regional – in determining the priorities for the Structural Funds and the guidelines for implementing regional projects. In general, the overarching priorities for the Structural Funds are set at the EU level and then transformed into national priorities by the member states and regions.

At the EU level the overarching priorities are established in the Community Strategic Guidelines (CSG). These set the framework for all actions that can be taken using the funds. Within this framework, each member state develops its own National Strategic Reference Framework (NSRF). The NSRF sets out the priorities for the respective member state, taking specific national policies into account. Finally, Operational Programmes for each region within the member state are drawn up in accordance with the respective NSRF, reflecting the needs of individual regions.

- EU Level: Community Strategic Guidelines,
- National Level: National Strategic Reference Framework for each member state,
- Regional Level: Operational Programme for each region.

=== Community Strategic Guidelines ===
The Community Strategic Guidelines (CSG) contain the principles and priorities of the EU's cohesion policy and suggest ways the European regions can take full advantage of the funding that has been made available for national and regional aid programmes for the period 2007–2013. There are three priorities:

- Improving the attractiveness of member states, regions and cities by improving accessibility, ensuring adequate quality and level of services, and preserving their environmental potential;
- Encouraging innovation, entrepreneurship and the growth of the knowledge economy by supporting research and innovation capacities, including new information and communication technologies;
- Creating more and better jobs by attracting more people into employment entrepreneurial activity, improving adaptability of workers and enterprises and increasing investment in human capital.

=== National Strategic Reference Framework ===
A National Strategic Reference Framework (NSRF) establishes the main priorities for spending the EU structural funding a member state receives between 2007 and 2013. Each member state has its own NSRF. Adopting an NSRF is a new requirement of the Structural Funds regulations for 2007 to 2013. Each NSRF functions as a high-level strategy for the Operational Programmes in the respective member state. The document provides an overview of the economic strengths and weaknesses of the member state's regions, and out the approach to future Structural Funds spending across the member state.

=== Operational Programmes ===
An Operational Programme (OP) sets out a region's priorities for delivering the funds. Although there is scope for regional flexibility, a region's priorities must be consistent with the member state's NSRF. There is an Operational Programme for each region in the EU. These OPs, just like the NSRF, have to be approved by the European Commission before any implementation.

== New architecture for 2014–2020 ==
Classification of regions from 2014 to 2020: Less developed regions Transition regions More developed regions

The European Commission has adopted a draft legislative package which will frame cohesion policy for 2014–2020. The new proposals are designed to reinforce the strategic dimension of the policy and to ensure that EU investment is targeted on Europe's long-term goals for growth and jobs ("Europe 2020").

Through partnership contracts agreed with the commission, member states will commit to focussing on fewer investment priorities in line with these objectives. The package also harmonises the rules related to different funds, including rural development and maritime and fisheries, to increase the coherence of EU action.

== New architecture for 2021–2027 ==
EU Cohesion Policy funds for the period 2021–2027 total €392 billion; with the addition of national co-financing contributions, the overall investment envelope reaches approximately half a trillion euros. Cohesion Policy for this period is delivered through four funds: the European Regional Development Fund (ERDF), the Cohesion Fund, the European Social Fund Plus (ESF+), and the Just Transition Fund (JTF), a new instrument introduced alongside the European Green Deal.

The JTF was established to assist territories facing serious social and economic challenges arising from the shift towards a climate-neutral economy, with particular focus on regions highly reliant on fossil fuels and carbon-intensive industries. Its overall budget for the programming period is EUR 17.5 billion, of which EUR 7.5 billion derives from the multiannual financial framework and a further EUR 10 billion from the NextGenerationEU recovery instrument.

For the 2021–2027 period, investments under the ERDF, ESF+ and Cohesion Fund are structured around five policy objectives: building a smarter, innovation-driven Europe (PO1); working towards a carbon-reduced and environmentally sustainable Europe (PO2); improving transport and digital connectivity across the Union (PO3); creating a more equitable and socially inclusive society (PO4); and fostering sustainable development that brings EU structures closer to citizens at local level (PO5). Approximately €226 billion of the total Cohesion Policy allocation was directed to the ERDF, making it the largest single fund by allocation.

== Proposed reform for 2028–2034 ==
On 16 July 2025, the European Commission presented its proposal for the next Multiannual Financial Framework (MFF) covering the period 2028 to 2034, with a total budget of approximately €2 trillion, equivalent to 1.26% of EU gross national income on average across the period, merging cohesion policy with agriculture, fisheries, migration and security funding into a single National and Regional Partnership Plan per member state, under which each member state would draw up a unified investment and reform programme tailored to national and regional priorities.

The NRPPs would be implemented with an overall envelope of €865 billion, which includes €50 billion from the Social Climate Fund. The Commission's proposal provides for a mandatory minimum allocation for less developed regions and includes a safeguard ensuring they receive overall at least as much funding as under the current cohesion envelope. The proposal has met with significant resistance from the European Parliament, which voted against key elements of the draft Single Fund regulation and called for the European Social Fund to be maintained as an independent instrument. As of mid-2026, negotiations between the Council and Parliament were ongoing, with no final agreement reached; the MFF regulation requires unanimous adoption by the Council after obtaining Parliament's consent.

== See also ==
- Budget of the European Union
- Committee of the Regions
- Council of the European Union
- Economic and Social Committee
- European legislative procedure
- European Investment Bank
- European Union
- European Union Regional policy
- ERDF
- ESF
- European Grouping for Territorial Cooperation
- European Parliament
- INTERREG
- Treaty of Lisbon
- Single European Act
