= Luis Planas =

Spanish politician and diplomat

The Most Excellent Luis Planas OOA DHSRA
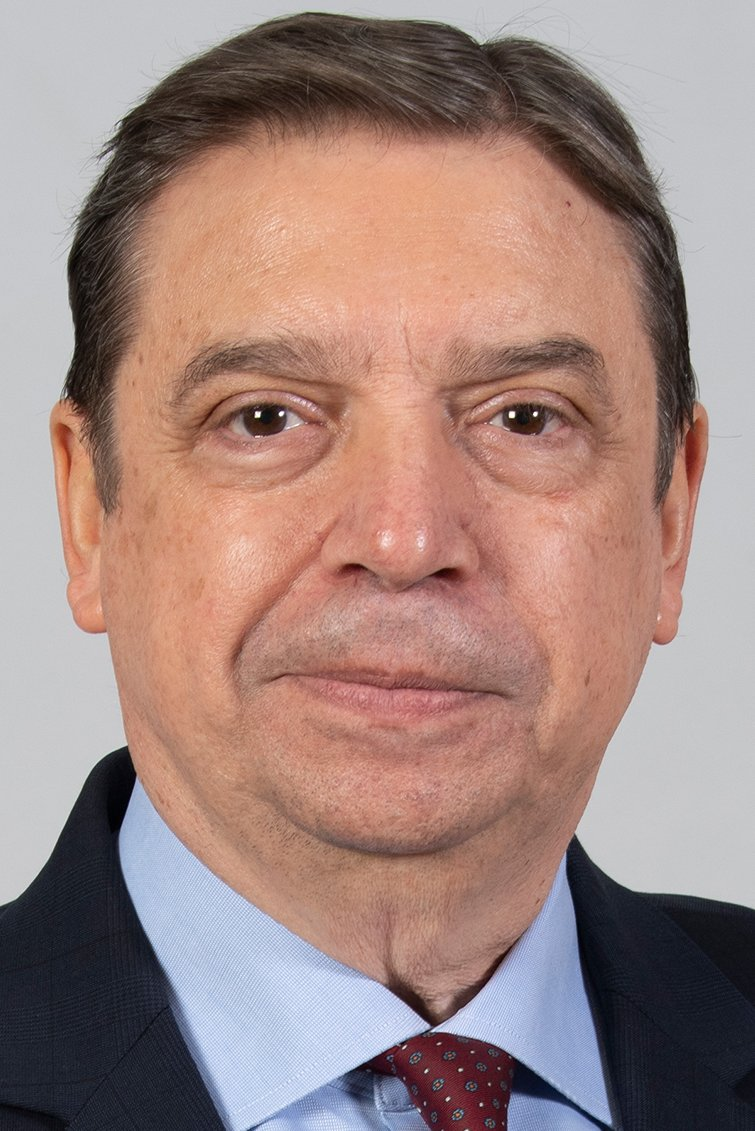
- Official portrait, 2023

Minister of Agriculture, Fisheries and Food of Spain
- Incumbent
- Assumed office 7 June 2018
- Prime Minister: Pedro Sánchez
- Preceded by: Isabel García Tejerina

Minister of Territorial Policy and Civil Service of Spain
- Acting; 21 May 2019 – 13 January 2020
- Prime Minister: Pedro Sánchez
- Preceded by: Meritxell Batet
- Succeeded by: Carolina Darias

Member of the European Parliament
- In office 1 January 1987 – 6 June 1993
- Constituency: Spain

Member of the Congress of Deputies
- In office 21 May 2019 – 21 February 2020
- Constituency: Córdoba
- In office 28 October 1982 – 23 April 1987
- Constituency: Córdoba

Member of the Senate
- In office 17 April 1996 – 13 June 1996
- Constituency: Andalusia

Personal details
- Born: 20 November 1952 (age 73) Valencia, Spain
- Party: Spanish Socialist Workers' Party
- Education: University of Valencia

Luis Planas Puchades (pronounced [ˈlwis ˈplanas]; born 20 November 1952) is a Spanish labour inspector, diplomat and politician serving as minister of Agriculture, Fisheries and Food since 2018. He has served as acting minister of Territorial Policy and Civil Service from May 2019 to January 2020 and represented Córdoba in the Congress of Deputies from 1982 to 1987 and from 2019 to 2020, and Andalusia region in the Spanish Senate from April to June 1996.

Planas was born in Valencia. He studied at the University of Valencia where he received his law degree. He joined the public service in 1980, when he joined the Labour Inspectors Corps and was assigned to Córdoba. He was first elected to the Spanish Congress of Deputies from Córdoba in 1982 and elected Member of the European Parliament in 1987 representing Spain.

In 1993, Andalusian president, Manuel Chaves, appointed him as Regional Minister for Agriculture, Fisheries and Food and in 1994 he was appointed Regional Minister of the Presidency. In 1996, he was designated as senator by the Parliament of Andalusia but he was quickly appointed Chief of Staff of the European Commission Vice President, Manuel Marín. He continued in European posts until 2004, when he was appointed Spanish Ambassador before Morocco. In 2010, he was appointed Permanent Representative of Spain to the European Union.

In 2013 Andalusian president, José Antonio Griñán, appointed him Regional Minister for Agriculture, Fisheries and Environment until late 2013. In 2014, he was elected Secretary-General of the European Economic and Social Committee, an office he left in June 2018 when prime minister Pedro Sánchez appointed him as Minister of Agriculture, Fisheries and Food.

== Early life and education ==
Planas was born in Valencia in 1952. He is the nephew of Josep Maria Planes, a distinguished journalist who was one of the promoters of the investigative journalism in Catalonia and that was murdered by anarchist militiamen at the beginning of the Spanish Civil War. He studied at the University of Valencia where he received his law degree and an Extraordinary Degree award.

== Early career ==
=== Labour Inspector and first contacts with politics ===
In 1980, he joined by public contest to the Labour Inspectorate and was assigned to Córdoba. In the 1982 general election, Planas was elected Member to the Cortes Generales for Córdoba. While serving, he was a member of the Constitutional Committee and the Committee on Foreign Affairs, he served as spokesman for the Socialist Parliamentary Group on European Affairs and member of the Joint Committee on Cortes Generales-European Parliament.

=== Member of the European Parliament, 1986–1993 ===
From 1986 to 1993 Planas served as a Member of the European Parliament. He was a member of the Committee on Foreign Affairs and the Institutional Affairs Committee, as well as member of the Delegation for the relationship with the Congress of the United States. He served as Deputy Chair of the Foreign Affairs Committee (1987–1989) and Vice President of the European Socialist Group (1991–1993). In addition to his committee assignments, he was a founding member in 1990 of the Transatlantic Economic Council.

=== First stage as Regional Minister, 1993–1996 ===
In 1993 Planas was appointed Minister of Agriculture and Fisheries of Andalusia and the following year, Minister of the Presidency of Andalusia, both positions under Manuel Chaves. He was also appointed member of the European Committee of the Regions. At the same time, he also served as Member of the Parliament of Andalusia for Cordoba. In 1996, he briefly served as senator to Cortes Generales by designation of the regional parliament of Andalusia.

=== European Commission, 1996–2004 ===
At the end of 1996, Planas returned to Brussels as chieff of staff of the Vice-President of the European Commission Manuel Marín, where he was responsible for relations with the Mediterranean, Latin America and Asia. In 1994 and until 2004, he served as chief of staff of European Commissioner of Economic and Monetary Affairs Pedro Solbes.

== Diplomatic career ==
In 2004, Planas was appointed Ambassador of Spain in Morocco, serving from May 1, 2004, until October 5, 2010. He then served as Permanent Representative of Spain to the European Union from October 5, 2010, and until December 31, 2011.

Briefly, after the 2012 general election, Planas returned to Spain to be appointed Minister of Agriculture, Fisheries and Environment in the Government of Andalusia under President José Antonio Griñán on May 7, 2012, a position he left on late September 2013. On March 1, 2014, Planas returned to the European Economic and Social Committee (EESC) as Secretary-General.

== Minister of Agriculture, Fisheries and Food ==
On June 6, 2018, Planas, who at that time was still secretary-general of the EESC, was appointed as Minister of Agriculture, Fisheries and Food by prime minister Pedro Sánchez. On 20 May 2019, Territorial Policy Minister Meritxell Batet resigned to the position in order to assume as President of the Congress of Deputies. Due to this, Planas was appointed as acting Minister of Territorial Policy and Civil Service. In this capacity, he was in charge of drafting a set of measures valued at 774 million euros ($850 million) to help the municipalities affected by deadly floods as well as by wildfires in 2019.

In early 2020, Planas had to face rural unrest due to the European Union budget cuts on agriculture as well as the low prices to rural producers. In order to give a solution and after a deep negotiation with involved actors, the government approved an urgent royal decree-law on February 26, 2020, to reform the Food Chain Act of 2013. Among the measures adopted, there are the prohibition of distributors to pay prices below the real cost, regulation of commercial promotions, publicity of sanctions for those who violate the measures and to strengthen the Agency for Food Information and Control role, increasing its budget and staff.

In April 2023, Planas wrote to the European Commissioner for Agriculture, Janusz Wojciechowski, to request for aid for Spain’s 890,000 farm workers and ranchers amid extreme drought conditions in its agricultural heartlands.

Political offices
Preceded by Leocadio Marín Rodríguez	Regional Minister of Agriculture, Fishing of Andalusia; 1993–1994	Succeeded by Paulino Plata Cánovas
Preceded by Concpeción Gutiérrez del Castillo	Regional Minister of the Presidency of Andalusia; 1994–1996	Succeeded by Gaspar Zarrías
Preceded by Clara Aguilera García	Regional Minister of Agriculture, Fishing and the Environment of Andalusia; 2012–2013	Succeeded by Elenea Vívoras Jiménez
Preceded by Meritxell Batet	Minister of Territorial Policy and Civil Service (acting); 2019–2020	Succeeded by Carolina Darias
Preceded by Isabel García Tejerina	Minister of Agriculture, Fisheries and Food; 2018–present	Incumbent
