= Common Fisheries Policy =

EU fisheries policy

The Common Fisheries Policy (CFP) is the fisheries policy of the European Union (EU). It sets quotas for how many of each fish species member states are allowed to catch, provides member states with fishing access to the Exclusive Economic Zones (EEZ) of all other member states, and manages sustainable fishing of the EU's EEZ.

When it came into force in 2009, the Treaty of Lisbon formally enshrined fisheries conservation policy as one of the handful of "exclusive competences" reserved for the European Union, to be decided by Qualified Majority Voting. However, general fisheries policy remains a "shared competence" of the Union and its member states. Decisions are now made by the Council of the European Union, and the European Parliament acting together under the co-decision procedure.

The Common Fisheries Policy was created to manage fish stock for the European Union as a whole. Article 38 of the 1957 Treaty of Rome, which created the European Communities (now European Union), stated that the common market shall extend to agriculture and trade in agricultural products. Agricultural products in the treaty meaning the products of the soil, of stock-farming and of fisheries and products of first-stage processing directly related to these products. It did not make any other specific mention of fisheries or common fishing areas.

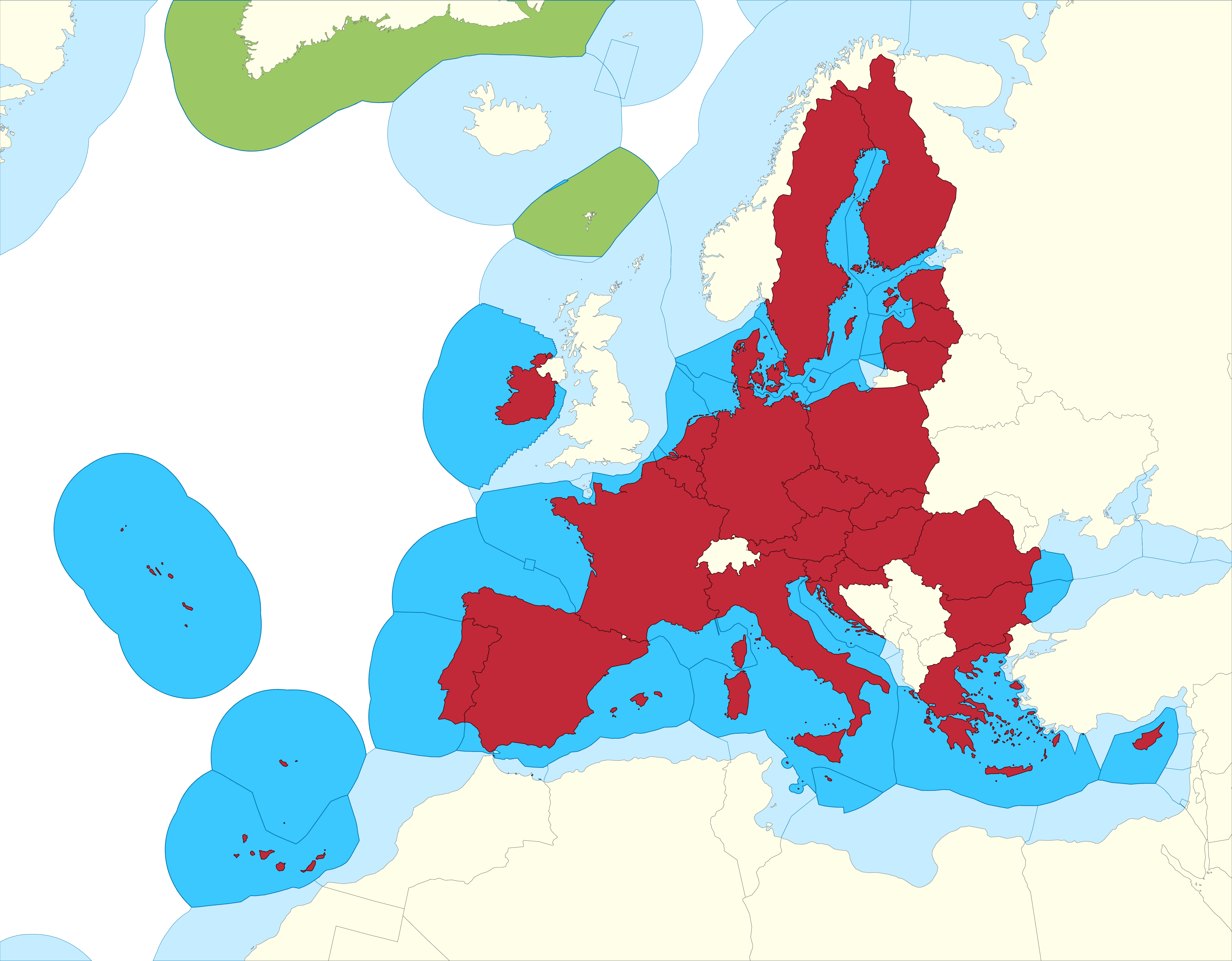
The EU's exclusive economic zone (EEZ). At 25 million square kilometres, it is the largest in the world. EU member state Exclusive Economic Zones EU member state overseas territory Exclusive Economic Zones EU member states Disputed Exclusive Economic Zones

== Importance of fishing in Europe ==
Fishing is a relatively minor economic activity within the EU. It contributes generally less than 1 per cent to gross national product. In 2007 the fisheries sector employed 141,110 fishermen. In 2007, 6.4 million tonnes of fish were caught by EU countries. The EU fleet has 97,000 vessels of varying sizes. Fish farming produced a further 1 million tonnes of fish and shellfish and employed another 85,000 people. The shortfall between fish catches and demand varies, but there is an EU trade deficit in processed fish products of €3 billion.

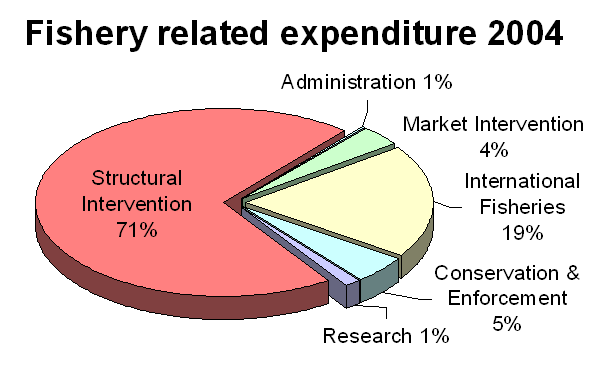

=== Catching ===
The combined EU fishing fleets land about 6 million tonnes of fish per year, of which about 700,000 tonnes are from UK waters. The UK's share of the overall EU fishing catch in 2014 was 752,000 tonnes, the second largest catch of any country in the EU. This proportion is determined by the London Fisheries Convention of 1964 and by the EU's Common Fisheries Policy.

In Fraserburgh, Scotland, the fishing industry creates 40% of employment and a similar figure in Peterhead. These were the EU's largest fishing ports and home to the pelagic vessel fleet. It is often in areas where other employment opportunities are limited. For this reason, community funds have been made available to fishing as a means of encouraging regional development.

The market for fish and fish products has changed in recent years. Supermarkets are now the main buyers of fish and expect steady supplies. Fresh fish sales have fallen, but demand for processed fish and prepared meals has grown. Despite this, employment in fish processing has been falling, with 60% of fish consumed in the EU coming from elsewhere. This is partly due to improvements in the ability to transport fresh fish internationally. Competitiveness of the EU fishing industry has been affected by overcapacity and shortages of fish to catch.

=== Aquaculture ===
Fish farming is the fastest growing area of world food production. In 1995 it produced one-third of the world's fish and shellfish by value. The main species in the EU are trout, salmon, mussels and oysters, but interest has been shown in sea bass, sea bream and turbot. Community support began in 1971 for inland fish farming, but was extended to other areas in the late 1970s. EU support covers similar areas to other land installations, but with additional concerns of technical and environmental problems caused by introducing major fish concentrations where farms are built. The industry suffers problems due to fluctuating demand for farmed fish.

== Mechanisms of the CFP ==
The CFP currently has four components:

- Regulation of production, quality, grading, packaging and labelling
- Encouraging producer organisations intended to protect fishermen from sudden market changes
- Setting minimum fish prices and financing buying up of unsold fish
- Set rules for trade with non-EU countries

=== Fishing quotas and regulations ===
==== Adoption of rules at Union level ====
The CFP sets the total allowable catch (TAC) quotas for how much of each species can be caught in a certain ICES Statistical Area or groups of areas on a yearly or two-yearly basis. Each country is given a quota based upon the total available (Total Allowable Catch, TAC) and their traditional share (percentage). TACs are fixed annually by the Council of Ministers. They consider proposals drawn up by the European Commission, which consults its own scientific advisers (Scientific, Technical and Economic Committee of Fisheries, STECF). STECF generally provides its advice to the European Commission taking account of the work conducted by the International Council for the Exploration of the Sea (ICES) and other regional fisheries advisory intergovernmental organisations. The proposals are subsequently submitted to the relevant regional fisheries management organisations for consultations with non-EU fishing nations, and adjusted when necessary. The quotas are ultimately approved as binding by the Council of the EU, with each of the EU member states made responsible for policing its own quota as well as distributing it among the fishermen, using a variety of systems.

==== Implementation at member state level ====
The Basic Regulation sets the common principles for the EU management, under which each Member State can use different management approaches as licences, limited entry or individual fishing quota. Catches and landings must be recorded. Regulations cover the kind of fishing gear that may be used. Areas may be closed from fishing to allow stocks to recover.

A minimum size for catch led to fishermen dumping dead fish that were too small to land legally, so a minimum mesh size was introduced, which let small fish escape to replenish stocks. Choice of mesh is complicated, because mature fish of different species are naturally different sizes and require different nets.

=== Producer organisations ===
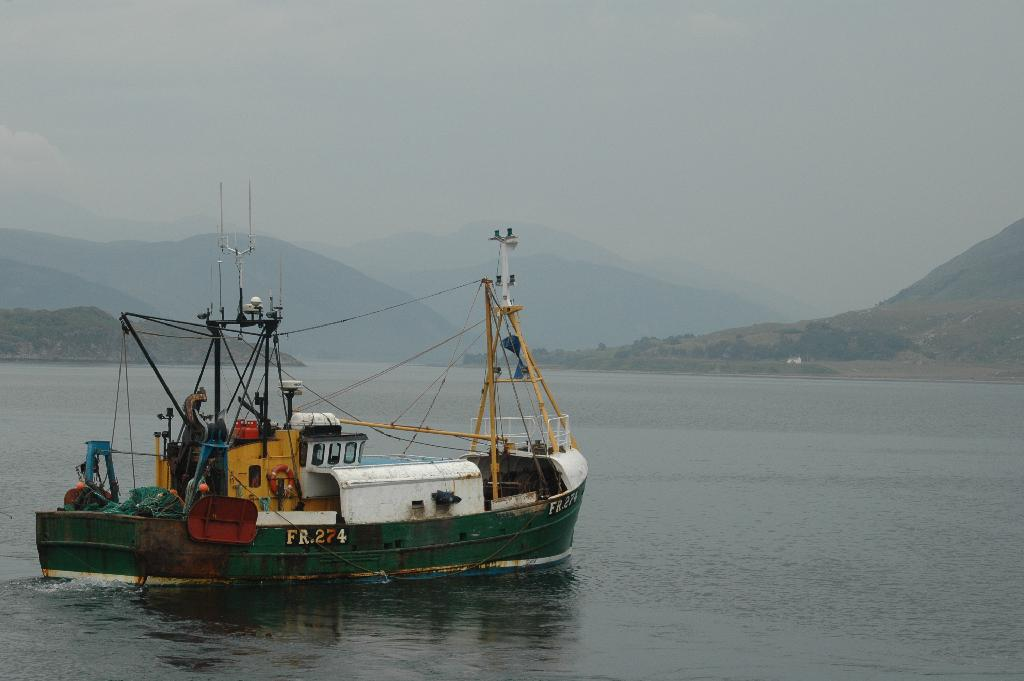
The EU's fishing fleet numbers 88,000 – the second largest in the world – and can fish freely across the European Union, catching nearly six million metric tonnes a year.

There are now more than 160 producer organisations (PO) in the EU. These are voluntary organisations set up by fishermen or fish farmers to assist in selling their product. Their members must include a minimum percentage of vessels in that sector, not discriminate in terms of nationality or location of their members within the EU, and must comply with other EU regulations. Organisations are required to develop plans to adjust fish catches to market demand. They may require non-members fishing in the same areas to follow the same restrictions as members.

They are empowered to take produce out of the market if prices fall below levels set by the Council of Ministers and receive compensation from the EU. Levels of compensation are set such that price falls as the amount of fish involved increases. Fish stocks may be stored and later returned to the market, or sold for animal feed. Buying-up of stocks must only be to cover occasional surpluses.

Tuna fishermen have a scheme where surplus stock is not bought up, but fishermen receive direct compensation if their income falls.

=== Structural policy regarding fleet and onshore fishing industry ===
In 1977 an aid programme was introduced to improve the fish processing industries, currently operating as the European Maritime, Fisheries and Aquaculture Fund. This includes such things as fish filleting, salting, drying, smoking, cooking, freezing and canning. It was intended to indirectly assist the catching industry. There has been an attempt to introduce new technologies to the sector, improve hygiene conditions, and also fund conversions of fish processing factories to other uses.

Each country is given a target for the size of its fleet. Funding is available to assist modernisation of boats and installations, but also to buy-out fishermen to reduce the fleet size. Money is available for advertising campaigns to encourage consumption of fish species that are not over-fished, or are unfamiliar to the public. Also, grants are available to assist the industry in improving product quality and managing quotas.

=== CFP regionalisation and devolution attempts ===
Due to growing demands to make the Common Fisheries Policy more decentralised (see #The CFP governance vs. the principle of subsidiarity section below), two regional groups of member states have been established through respective memoranda of understanding, one named BALTFISH which has included all the EU member states with a Baltic coast, while the other one, known as the Scheveningen Group, has been its North Sea counterpart. They are tasked with preparing drafts of quotas and regulations and submitting them for consideration to the EU institutions. These groups lack, however, any decision-making or enforcement powers essential for a regional fisheries management organisation, thus neither of them has been treated as such. These powers have remained exclusively at the hands of the European Union institutions.

=== Funding instruments ===
Fishing was initially funded under the European Agricultural Guidance and Guarantee Fund (EAGGF). In 1977 an aid programme to improve the fish processing industries was established by the EU as a part of the EAGGF. Subsequently, the fisheries guidance (or structural) funding was split-off from EAGGF to form the separate Financial Instrument for Fisheries Guidance (FIFG) in 1993, while the fish market interventions have remained a task of the EAGGF and its successor, the European Agricultural Guarantee Fund (EAGF). From 1994 to 1999 the budget for FIFG totalled 700 million ECU. Any grant from FIFG had to be accompanied by a minimum contribution from the national government. A grant to business must include a proportionate contribution from the business itself. Different rates of aid were applied to different regions. Subsequently, FIFG was renamed European Fisheries Fund in 2007, later transformed into the European Maritime and Fisheries Fund (EMFF) in 2013, and ultimately into the current European Maritime, Fisheries and Aquaculture Fund (EMFAF) in 2021.

From 2007 to 2013, the Fund was allocated approximately 4.3 billion Euro to provide to the European fishing sector. The adoption of the EMFAF was not uncontested, in particular by environmental groups, as it includes the possibility to fund vessel modernisation and other measures, which might increase pressure on already overfished stocks.

=== Enforcement and compliance ===
Enforcement is the responsibility of member states, but there is a community level inspection service to ensure that member states enforce the rules within their own country. Member states are also under an obligation to ensure that their vessels observe EU agreements when operating outside the EU. The regulations are also intended to harmonise penalties for breaking the regulations in different countries.

Enforcement involves managing quotas and implementing technical measures to preserve fish stocks. Inspectors may check fishing gear and inspect the register of fish caught. The type of fish caught is checked and compared to quotas of total permitted catch for a vessel. Checks may be made in port or at sea, and using aerial photography. Inspectors may also check fish processing factories to ensure that all fish is documented and can be traced to its source. EU inspectors check that hygiene and processing regulations in any country exporting to the EU are satisfactory and of an equal standard to controls within the EU.

Non-compliance remains a significant problem. In a number of EU fisheries, illegal fishing accounts for one-third to one-half of all catches.

== Relations with third countries and intergovernmental organisations ==
The EU has become a party to the United Nations Convention on the Law of the Sea as well as the United Nations Fish Stocks Agreement. EU has an exclusive mandate to represent its member states in the regional fisheries management organisations (RFMOs) other than the International Whaling Commission, except for the dependent territories of member states remaining outside of the EU, represented by the member states themselves, and has negotiated agreements to regain access to some of the fishing grounds in return for alternative trading rights. In contrast, the regional fisheries advisory bodies (RFABs) may be joined both by the EU and directly by its the members states.

External trade is now affected by the General Agreement on Tariffs and Trade (GATT), regulated by the World Trade Organization (WTO).

=== Baltic Sea and the Danish Straits ===
Prior to 2007, the International Baltic Sea Fishery Commission (IBFC) established by the Gdańsk Convention in 1973, was the general regional fisheries management organisation for the Baltic Sea and the Danish Straits, to which the EU was party until 1 January 2006. Following accession of all Baltic coastal states except Russia to the EU, the Baltic Sea has become almost entirely covered by the EU EEZ, except for two small patches belonging to Russian EEZ. Because of that, the Gdańsk Convention was terminated and the IBFC was dissolved on 1 January 2007, while its tasks have been taken over directly by the EU CFP, though they have been exercised in cooperation with Russia, as arranged in the Agreement between the European Community and the Government of the Russian Federation on cooperation in fisheries and the conservation of the living marine resources in the Baltic Sea. Thus, no general regional fishery management organisation is currently responsible for the Baltic Sea, managed thereafter by the EU in line with a bilateral EU-Russia general regional fishery management arrangement instead. Nevertheless, the sea has still remained managed by a tuna RMFO (ICCAT) and two further specialized RFMOs dedicated to salmon (NASCO) and whaling (IWC).

=== North Sea, Irish Sea, Nordic Seas, Barents Sea, White Sea and remainder of North East Atlantic ===
EU has participated in the North East Atlantic Fisheries Commission, the general regional fisheries management organisation for the North Sea, the Irish Sea, the Nordic Seas, the Barents Sea, the White Sea and the remainder of North East Atlantic, except for the Baltic Sea and the Danish straits. In 1997 North Sea states and EU representatives agreed a joint approach to identifying risks to the marine environment. A precautionary approach was adopted to seek to prevent pollution before damage was caused to the environment. Studies are being undertaken to monitor stocks of all fish, not just commercially important species.

In February 2020, as soon as the Brexit occurred, Fisheries issue was raised, initially in Guernsey. After the first ban, a temporary "régime d'autorisation" has been set up to allow individual boats to fish in Guernsey. In May 2021, France threatened to cut off electricity to the British Channel Island of Jersey in a fight over post-Brexit fishing rights, as part of the 2021 Jersey dispute.

In May 2025, the EU and the United Kingdom reached a twelve-year extension on the EU's access to British fishing waters.

=== Mediterranean Sea and Black Sea ===
Most fishing in the Mediterranean Sea and the Black Sea has been confined to a 12-mile (22-km) strip considered territorial waters. The EU belongs to the General Fisheries Commission for the Mediterranean (GFCM), a general regional fisheries management organisation covering also the Black Sea.

=== Other (remote) general regional fisheries management organisations ===
The EU has also been a member of the Northwest Atlantic Fisheries Organization, the Commission for the Conservation of Antarctic Marine Living Resources, the South East Atlantic Fisheries Organisation, the Southern Indian Ocean Fisheries Agreement, the South Pacific Regional Fisheries Management Organisation, and the Western and Central Pacific Fisheries Commission, some of them covering EU overseas territories.

=== Tuna and other specialized regional fisheries management organisations ===
The European Union has also been a member of:

- the International Commission for the Conservation of Atlantic Tunas making decisions also for the Mediterranean tuna. In 1994, conservation regulations were introduced banning certain fishing methods. In 1997 targets were set for tuna catches.
- the Inter-American Tropical Tuna Commission and the Indian Ocean Tuna Commission, as their decisions are relevant to some of the EU overseas territories,
- the North Atlantic Salmon Conservation Organization, making decisions also for the North Sea and the Baltic Sea salmon populations. The EU has been participating in almost all bodies of the organisation, except for the North American Commission.
- the International Whaling Commission

It has also been a member of the extended commission (≈ an associate member) of:

- the Commission for the Conservation of Southern Bluefin Tuna.

=== Regional fisheries advisory bodies ===
The EU cooperates closely with the International Council for the Exploration of the Sea, the primary source of scientific advice guiding the CFP decisions, though it has not become an ICES member, in order to avoid a potential conflict of interest. ICES recommendations, despite their non-binding character, have been basis for practically all of the EU decisions regarding the CFP.

European Union has also been a member of further three regional fisheries advisory intergovernmental organisations:

- European Inland Fisheries and Aquaculture Advisory Commission
- Fishery Committee for the Eastern Central Atlantic
- Western Central Atlantic Fishery Commission

== Criticism ==
The Common Fisheries Policy has been argued by certain commentators to have had disastrous consequences for the environment. This view is contradicted by historical evidence revealing that fishing stocks have been in chronic decline over the last century as a result of intensive trawl fishing. According to scientific research published in 2010, the depletion of fishing stocks is a consequence of mismanagement long before the Common Fisheries Policy came into being, a statement illustrated by the fact that British catch rates have declined by 94% over the last 118 years. Nonetheless, the Common Fisheries Policy has continued the trend of ineffective fisheries management in European waters. Indeed, the Common Fisheries Policy has done little if anything to reverse the decline of European fish stocks.

The Common Fisheries Policy has been criticized by some fishermen who believe it is threatening their livelihoods.

EU quotas can mean that fish are thrown overboard after being caught. The quotas are enforced per species, but fishermen can only partly control what species they catch, so species with full quota get thrown. Yet as they are dead, this does not alleviate the problem as it was intended to.

The Common Fisheries Policy has been a major reason for countries with both substantial fish resources and small home markets, like Norway, Iceland, and Danish dependencies (Greenland and the Faroe Islands) and some other dependencies, to stay outside the European Union.

=== The CFP governance vs. the principle of subsidiarity ===
A common criticism of the CFP is its centralised, top-down approach to management; although Member States are responsible for the policy's implementation and enforcement, members have originally given the European Commission sole competence in the creation of proposals and the making of decisions. The commission is not exclusively responsible for the setting of total allowable catches. These are proposed by the commission but ultimately determined by the Council of [Fisheries] Ministers. Allocation of national catch quotas to Member States is on a pre-determined basis—the so-called relative stability—giving each member state pre-determined percentages of the available fishing opportunities. Although Member States hold some responsibilities, such as the distribution of quotas, it is argued that the EU retains too much authority over fisheries management. Furthermore, critics maintain that the organisation is ill-suited to the task of fisheries management as it lacks sufficient understanding of fisheries, and is too far removed from the realities of the industry to set accurate TACs and quotas. The command-and-control method characterized by the CFP is no longer deemed an effective form of fisheries management, and advocates of CFP reform consider a shift from traditional government to participatory third-order governance, incorporating the fisheries industry and Member States, to be vital to the success of the policy.

Consequently, it is suggested that the management of the CFP could be improved through the application of the theory of subsidiarity—the principle that political decisions should be handled at the lowest, least-centralized competent level. The subsidiarity principle was introduced into EU policies as part of the 1992 Maastricht Treaty; however, it does not apply to areas such as the CFP over which the Community retains exclusive competence. A partial devolution of authority, for example involving Member States in the decision-making process and delegating the day-to-day management of fisheries to industry-based organisations, could potentially facilitate the inclusion of industry concerns into the CFP, involving those directly affected by the policy in management decisions and creating to a CFP which encourages compliance and collaboration.

The call for application of the subsidiarity principle to the CFP lies within the argument for its decentralisation. De-centralization featured prominently in discussions related to the 2002 CFP reform, but the reform itself actually increased centralization within the CFP, removing the right of Member States to block quota proposals and increasing the EU's role in enforcement. This increasing monopoly and disregard for the wishes of the fisheries industry led to alienation of stakeholders and resulted in reduced compliance. The failure of this increasingly centralized reform has proved to de-centralization advocates that stakeholder participation in the governance process is crucial to the future success of fisheries governance.

However, some critics argue that applying the subsidiarity principle to the CFP may not improve the policy's effectiveness, as it may lead to what de Vivero et al. term the "participation paradox"—the theory that the greater the number of actors involved in the decision-making process, the less significant the contribution made by each actor, and the smaller the participatory role played in the policy process. Greater devolution within CFP decision-making may therefore silence the voice of the fisheries industry as it competes with other state, private and civil actors to whom authority is also granted. Thus, although the subsidiarity principle can facilitate the government-to-governance transition advocated by many in relation to reform of the CFP, the participatory role of key stakeholders affected by the policy must be maximized to ensure the development of an effective and equitable Common Fisheries Policy.

The EU has recently introduced some elements of CFP devolution (see the #CFP regionalisation and devolution attempts section above).

== History ==
=== Origins ===
The first rules were created in 1970, after being split off from the Treaty of Rome. The original six Common Market members realized that four countries applying to join the Common Market at that time (the United Kingdom, Ireland, Denmark including Greenland, and Norway) would control the richest fishing grounds in the world. The original six therefore drew up Council Regulation 2141/70 giving all Members equal access to all fishing waters, even though the Treaty of Rome did not explicitly include fisheries in its agriculture chapter. This was adopted on the morning of 30 June 1970, a few hours before the applications to join were officially received. This ensured that the regulations became part of the acquis communautaire before the new members joined, obliging them to accept the regulation. In its accession negotiations, the UK at first refused to accept the rules but by the end of 1971 the UK gave way and signed the Accession Treaty on 22 January 1972, thereby bringing into the CFP joint management an estimated four fifths of all the fish off Western Europe. Norway decided not to join. Greenland left the EC in 1985, after having gained partial independence from Denmark in 1979.

When the fisheries policy was originally set up, the intention was to create a free trade area in fish and fish products with common rules. It was agreed that fishermen from any state should have access to all waters, except Irish fishermen that were refused access to fish any waters east of 4° West, thus closing the North Sea to them. An exception was made for the coastal strip, which was reserved for local fishermen who had traditionally fished those areas. A policy was created to assist modernization of fishing vessels and on-shore installations.

=== 1970s and 80s ===
In 1976 the EC extended its fishing waters from 12 nautical miles to 200 nautical miles (22.2 km to 370.4 km) from the coast, in line with other international changes; however, fishing rights to fisheries outside the EU were significantly reduced when exclusive economic zones were defined in 1982. This required additional controls and the CFP as such was created in 1983. This now had four areas of activity: conservation of stocks, vessels and installations, market controls, and external agreements with other nations.

=== 1992 ===
It was determined that there had been over-investment in vessels, over-fishing and that numbers of fish landed were decreasing. The review identified a need to improve compliance with the regulations. This led to a tightening of regulations and better monitoring of individual vessels. A second review was planned for 2002.

=== 1995 ===
Although fishing could be managed by reducing the fleet size, available fish vary from year to year too much to make this sensible. So a permit system was introduced stating where and when boats are allowed to fish. Scientific studies were commissioned to better-determine available stocks and guide allocation of permits.

=== 2009 ===
In 2009, the EU Commission launched a wide-ranging debate on the way that EU fisheries are managed. It received input from EU citizens, organisations and EU-countries and published a report on the consultation.

In 2009, Iceland applied for European Union membership. The Common Fisheries Policy was not acceptable to Iceland, but the country hoped to negotiate a better deal. However, this was not so successful, and following a change in government Iceland withdrew their application.

=== 2013 ===
In February 2013 the European Parliament voted for reform of the Common Fisheries Policy, including measures to protect endangered stocks, and the ending of discards. The new CFP came into effect from 1 January 2014, though more talks with EU governments are involved. In presenting the reform package, the German Social Democrat MEP Ulrike Rodust stated: "As of 2015 the principle of maximum sustainable yield shall apply ... Our objective is that depleted fish stocks recover by 2020. Not only nature will benefit, but also fishermen: bigger stocks produce higher yields." The 2013 reform led to a greater role for the European Parliament, involving the convening of a trilateral dialogue (or "trilogue") between the European Council, European Commission and the Parliament, to work towards general agreement on reforming the CFP.

=== 2020 ===
The withdrawal of the UK from the EU affected the CFP, with the details determined by trade negotiations between the EU and the UK.

== See also ==
- Fisheries Convention
- Common Agricultural Policy
- European Fisheries Control Agency
- Agriculture and Fisheries configuration of the Council
- European Commissioner for Maritime Affairs and Fisheries
- Directorate-General for Maritime Affairs and Fisheries
- European Parliament Committee on Fisheries
- European Maritime, Fisheries and Aquaculture Fund
- List of harvested aquatic animals by weight
