= Fishery Resources Monitoring System =

The Fishery Resources Monitoring System (FIRMS) is a partnership of intergovernmental fisheries organizations that share information on the global monitoring and management of marine fishery resources.

== Activities ==
- FIRMS draws together a unified partnership of international organizations, regional fishery bodies collaborating within a formal agreement to report and share information on fisheries resources.
- The Secretariat and system maintenance are part of the FAO Regular Programme (Food and Agriculture Organization).
- It was established in February 2004 to respond to the need to achieve a sustainability of the fisheries and to provide relevant, reliable and up-to-date information on a global scale.
- FIRMS aims to provide information in order to develop effective fisheries policies in accordance with the Code of Conduct for Responsible Fisheries.

This code of conduct, adopted by FAO members on 31 October 1995, contains a broad set of principles and methods for developing and managing fisheries and aquaculture. A voluntary, non-binding instrument, the code is widely recognized as the global standard for settling out the aims of sustainable fisheries and aquaculture for the coming decades.

- The information available in FIRMS is based on international protocols and data/metadata standards. It benefits also of functionalities from the Fisheries Global Information System (FIGIS) implemented by FAO.
- The information is presented in synthesized fact sheets and state of resource summaries which include images, maps of geographical distribution, general biological and habitat characteristics, scientific assessment results, management considerations and status and trends statements.

== Partners ==
Currently, the FIRMS partnership is composed of 13 international organizations:

- Commission for the Conservation of Antarctic Marine Living Resources (CCAMLR)
- Commission for the Conservation of Southern Bluefin Tuna (CCSBT)
- Statistical Office of the European Communities (EUROSTAT)
- Food and Agriculture Organization of the United Nations (FAO) - Fisheries Department
- General Fisheries Commission for the Mediterranean (GFCM)
- Inter-American Tropical Tuna Commission (IATTC)
- International Commission for the Conservation of Atlantic Tunas (ICCAT)
- International Council for the Exploration of the Sea (ICES)
- Indian Ocean Tuna Commission (IOTC)
- Northwest Atlantic Fisheries Organization (NAFO)
- North Atlantic Salmon Conservation Organization (NASCO)
- North East Atlantic Fisheries Commission (NEAFC)
- Southeast Asian Fisheries Development Center (SEAFDEC)
- South East Atlantic Fisheries Organization (SEAFO)

== See also ==
- List of harvested aquatic animals by weight
- 2003 in the environment
