= Transshipment at sea =

Transfer of goods from one ship to another

Transshipment or transhipment at sea is done by transferring goods such as cargo, personnel, and equipment from one ship to another. It is a common practice in global fisheries and typically takes place between smaller fishing vessels and large specialized refrigerated transport vessels, also referred to as "reefers" that onload catch and deliver supplies if necessary.

Transshipment at sea is driven by economic and logistic performance as well as the potential to avoid control measures. It has been criticized as enabling illegal, unreported and unregulated fishing (IUU), marine life depletion through overfishing, forced labor, human rights abuses, human trafficking, and the smuggling of weapons and drugs.

== Economic importance ==
Transshipping their catch allows fishing vessels to remain at sea for months or even years and cover large areas of fishing grounds. Many distant-water fishing fleets depend on transshipment at sea as a major factor of their support lines, supplying them with fuel, fishing bait, food, water, and new crew members. Due to their size and freezing capacities, few reefers can service many fishing vessels over a long period of time, making it more economical than having the entire fishing fleet return to a port to offload its catch. The transshipment vessels also guarantee that caught fish swiftly finds its way to the markets, without a decrease in quality.

Transshipment at sea is especially important to the profitability of fisheries targeting:

- demersal- or coastal-pelagic species on the continental shelves that generate high-volume catch as it allows vessels with limited hold capacities to continue fishing without returning to a port
- highly migratory species, such as tuna, sharks and billfishes on the high seas that generate high-value catch as few fishing vessels possess the deep-freezing facilities necessary to preserve the freshness and thus the market-value.

== Transshipment detection ==
Establishing a reliable overview of transshipment at sea encounters is complicated by several factors:

- Vessel encounters at sea are not unusual, which is why ships engaging in transshipment seldom attract attention.
- International reporting obligations, observing mechanisms, and control capacities are vastly different depending on the regulatory authority in charge. Some regulatory frameworks that restrict transshipment simultaneously provide loopholes such as leaving reporting obligations in the hands of the flag state.
- Data on transshipment is often considered sensitive business information and not made accessible to the public.
- Detecting transshipment at sea is further complicated by vessels "going dark", for which there can be a valid reason such as the fear of piracy but also the intent to avoid official scrutiny as indicated by the frequency at which this behavior is encountered.

Automatic identification system (AIS) signals can be used to track vessels over time and map potential transshipment behavior, especially since most refrigerated cargo vessels are larger than 300 gross tonnage and thus required to carry AIS. To identify transshipment at sea encounters, a team from Global Fishing Watch synchronized AIS broadcasts with fishery registry entries collected over a period of five years from 2012 to 2017. They narrowed down the refrigerated cargo vessels capable of transshipping fish at sea during that time to a total of 694 worldwide. Furthermore, they found 10,233 likely transshipment encounters between fishing- and transshipment vessels, which is a conservative estimate since it neglects fishing vessels that turn off their AIS. They also reported 46,570 instances of transshipment vessels loitering long enough on their own to potentially receive a transshipment, which while accounting for vessels "going dark", likely overestimates the total amount of transshipment encounters. In 2018, Global Fishing Watch has released an interactive map on its website, showing likely transshipment at sea encounters in near-real time.

One way to address the limitations of AIS tracking and detect "dark" vessels is to make use of synthetic-aperture radar (SAR) and electro-optical imagery (EO). However, this requires the target location to be known well in advance, which can be determined by analyzing patterns in the supply chain and vessel behaviors such as focusing on locations where vessels often turn off AIS signals. Skylight, a company founded by Microsoft co-founder Paul Allen, has developed a maritime information system for governments and other organizations combining AIS, satellite imagery (SAR and EO), machine learning algorithms, and network analysis to detect transshipments and illegal fishing in real time.

== Regional distribution and patterns ==
The transshipment encounters identified by Global Fishing Watch show clear regional patterns of prevalence with Russia listed as its own region due to its disproportionately high share of events (24.9% of the total of likely transshipment events), followed by Africa (8.6%), Oceania (4.9%), North America (2.8%), Europe (2.6%), South America (2.3%), and Asia (2.1%). There is a particularly high density of events in the Sea of Okhotsk, and the Russian Barents Sea, which can be explained by standard operations made necessary by the long distances between the fishing grounds and the ports of Vladivostok and Murmansk.

Over half of the events occurred on the high seas beyond national jurisdiction (51.8%), frequently in international waters off the coast of Russia, Japan, Argentina, and Peru in the vicinity of large squid fleets and near the Exclusive economic zones (EEZs) of East-African countries. In the case of Peru and Argentina, events tend to cluster at the edge of their EEZs, raising concerns about fishing vessels "going dark" by turning off their AIS while illegally fishing in national waters.

Using a subset of the dataset put together by Global Fishing Fishing Watch, researchers found that regional patterns of likely transshipment behavior can be further discerned by the type of ships used in the encounters: Trawlers were most common within national waters particularly in the northern hemisphere, purse-seiners were predominant in the Western-Pacific Ocean, longliners mainly amassed in the equatorial regions in tropical and subtropical waters, and squid jiggers clustered along the edges of South-American EEZs as well as off the coast of Eastern Russia and Japan.

== Flag distribution and pairings ==
The fishing vessels involved in likely transshipment encounters as identified by Global Fishing Watch were flagged under a diverse array of nations with Russia (45%) making up almost half of them, followed by China (14.5%), the United States (US) (12%), Taiwan (8.6%), South Korea (7.3%), and Japan (5.7%). Contrary to fishing vessels, it is a common practice for transshipment vessels to change flag registration over time. This is reflected by a high percentage (43%) of transshipment vessels involved in likely transshipment encounters sailing under a flag of convenience, a flag different than the country of ownership. Among them, there are countries like Panama (20.2% of the total of likely transshipment encounters), Liberia (5.4%) and Vanuatu (13.3%), listed by the International Transport Workers' Federation (ITF) as particularly lax on restrictions and oversight.

While Russian fishing vessels predominantly paired with Russian transshipment vessels and the same can be observed for the US, there is a propensity for Chinese, Taiwanese, South Korean and Japanese fishing vessels to make use of transshipment vessels sailing under a flag of convenience country.

== Transshipment regulation ==
Transshipment at sea is regulated by coastal states within their EEZs as determined by the United Nations Convention on the Law of the Sea (UNCLOS) and Regional fishery management organizations (RFMOs) in international waters. Within Zones, that neither fall under national jurisdiction nor that of an RFMO only flag state control measures apply.

Several states have imposed a temporary or permanent ban of transshipment at sea within their EEZs or for vessels sailing under their flag:

- Europe: The European Union Council IUU regulation prohibits transshipment at sea between third country fishing vessels as well as between third country fishing vessels and fishing vessels flying the flag of an EU member state within community waters.
- Latin America: Chile has banned on transshipment at sea within their EEZs. Belize only authorizes the practice in case of a force majeure with an observer or an effective transshipment program in place.
- Africa: Guinea-Bissau, as well as Ivory Coast and Senegal prohibit transshipment at sea within their EEZs. In Ghana, a variant of transshipment called "Saiko", that involves foreign vessels selling their catch to local fishing canoes was considered illegal until September 2018.
- Asia and Oceania: Transshipment at sea is illegal within the EEZs of Indonesia, and Nauru. Thailand enforced a number of measures, directed at strengthening their control of overseas fishing including a temporary ban of transshipment for Thai fishing vessels in international waters in 2017.

There are considerable variations in RFMO regulations on transshipment at sea. Measures range from requirements related to authorization and notification, vessel monitoring systems, data-sharing, joint inspection schemes, and observer schemes to partial bans, with conditions attached and complete bans.

So far, the Inter-American Tropical Tuna Commission (IATTC), the International Commission for the Conservation of Atlantic Tunas (ICCAT), the Indian Ocean Tuna Commission (IOTC), the General Fisheries Commission for the Mediterranean (GFCM), and the Western and Central Pacific Fisheries Commission (WCPFC) have issued a partial ban, precluding certain vessels from engaging in transshipment at sea activities under their jurisdiction. The South East Atlantic Fisheries Organization (SEAFO) has prohibited transshipment at sea for all vessels.

Major reforms, such as a ban require a vote by the commission overseeing the respective RFMO, carried into force by either a simple majority (e.g. ICCAT), a two-thirds majority (e.g. IOTC), or a unanimous agreement (e.g. SEAFO and WCPFC).

== Transshipment at sea and crime ==
The Food and Agriculture Organization of the United Nations (FAO) recognizes unauthorized and unregulated transshipment at sea operations as an economic driver with the potential to circumvent existing IUU regulations and has included guidelines on the practice in its International Plan of Action to Prevent, Deter, and Eliminate Illegal, Unreported and Unregulated Fishing. To obscure IUU fishing, illegally caught fish can for instance be combined with legal catch, transshipped to vessels that carry legal documentation, and offloaded in ports of convenience, that are known to have minimal regulatory- and inspection standards.

Some civil society organizations have been particularly outspoken about the impact of transshipment on human rights. Greenpeace has conducted several investigations revealing widespread human rights abuses in the operations of Thai overseas fishing companies, as well as cases of human trafficking, severe mistreatment and modern-day slavery in Taiwan's distant water fisheries industry. The Environmental Justice Foundation also documented forced labor onboard of Thai fishing vessels as well as the use of mother ships for human trafficking off the West-African coast. These and other inquiries reveal how recruiters use false promises and non-binding verbal agreements to lure migrants onboard fishing vessels, where corruption, debt-bondage, and transshipments help to keep them confined for months or even years, often under conditions detrimental to their health

Transshipment at sea has also been associated with drug trafficking. According to the United Nations Office on Drugs and Crime (UNODC) fishing- and transshipment vessels play a role in the smuggling of cocaine, and amphetamine-type stimulants (ATS) The office reported several instances of cocaine seizures on fishing vessels used by South-American, European, and African drug syndicates to transship their illicit goods to smaller speedboats or larger mother ships. ATS and ATS precursor materials like opiates or coca leaves are also transshipped via fishing boats and have for instance been linked to the illegal abalone trade in Australia, New Zealand and South Africa.

== See also ==
- Transshipment
- Lightering
- Vessel Monitoring System
- Flags of Convenience
- Fisheries Law
- Maritime Security
- Illegal, unreported and unregulated fishing
