= Illegal, unreported and unregulated fishing in the Arctic =

Illegal, unreported and unregulated fishing (IUU) in the Arctic includes arctic cod, king crab, and possibly haddock, but there are few recent research studies that analyze the extent of the problem in this region, which includes the Barents Sea and parts of the Norwegian Sea. Fishing in Arctic waters is regulated by the global United Nations Convention on the Law of the Sea (UNCLOS), agreements related to Regional Fisheries Management Organizations (RFMOs) or bilateral agreements, and national legislation. Relevant countries with fishing law enforcement responsibilities include Denmark, the United States, Norway, and Russia.

== Extent ==
This is an under-researched scientific field. Recent academic articles about IUU in the Arctic mainly concern the mid-2000s. Scholars researching IUU in the Arctic include political scientists, jurists, biologists, data scientists, and risk analysts. The complexity of the issue, the remoteness of the region and the vast expenditures needed to conduct research in the Arctic are likely causes for this lack of knowledge.

The shady nature of IUU fishing makes it difficult for scholars and governments alike to get an overall view of the total amount of the IUU fishing in the Arctic. Scholars dealing with IUU in the Arctic often investigate a few subsets of species such as cod and haddock or king crab. Thus, an overall view of IUU fishing of all commercially caught species in the Arctic is not available.

=== Arctic cod ===
The International Council for the Exploration of the Sea (ICES) has estimated the amount of the unreported arctic cod in the Food and Agriculture Organization's (FAO) subarea 1 and 2 (the Barents Sea and parts of the Norwegian Sea). ICES estimate that in 1990–1994 and 2002–2008 between 3.2% and 25.2% of the total catch of arctic cod was unreported. Although there is no knowledge about IUU fishing outside those periods ICES believes that by 2018 IUU fishing of arctic cod is close to zero.

=== Haddock ===
Between 2002 and 2008 ICES estimates that between 3.7% and 25.4% of the landing of haddocks from the Russian and Norwegian parts of the Barents Sea was unreported. In 2018 they estimated that the IUU catches of haddock is close to zero.

=== King crab ===
A major decrease in the Russian king crab stock of the Barents Sea was observed between 2007 and 2008. Researchers mainly attribute the decline of king crabs to IUU fishing. The decrease of king crabs eventually led to a moratorium of fishing of the king crabs in the waters off the coast of the Kola Peninsula. This has resulted in an increased abundance of king crabs.

IUU fishing contributes significantly to the decline of fish stocks, with estimates indicating that at least 20% of fish caught globally are from IUU activities, costing coastal nations between $10 billion and $23 billion annually.

The United States' 2023 Report to Congress identified seven nations and entities involved in IUU fishing, highlighting the global nature of the problem and the need for international cooperation to address it.

== Regulation of Arctic fisheries ==
The management of Arctic fisheries is regulated by at least three layers of legislation. The global United Nations Convention on the Law of the Sea (UNCLOS), agreements related to Regional Fisheries Management Organizations (RFMO's) or bilateral agreements and national legislation.

=== United Nations' Law of the Seas (UNCLOS) ===
The UNCLOS serve as the underlying legal framework for the governance of the world's oceans. Article 56 gives States sovereign rights for the exploitation and management of living resources within states' exclusive economic zone (EEZ). However States should ensure:

"...the maintenance of the living resources… is not endangered by over-exploitation."

— UNCLOS, Art. 61,

Furthermore, States should cooperate in global, regional or subregional organizations to further this goal. States have the same obligations for the conservation of living resources on the high seas.

Several scholars do not consider the UNCLOS as adequate to secure fisheries in the Arctic high seas from IUU. Instead scholars recommend the establishment of an effective RFMO's to regulate the high's seas of the Arctic.

=== Regional Fishery Management Organizations and Bilateral Agreements ===
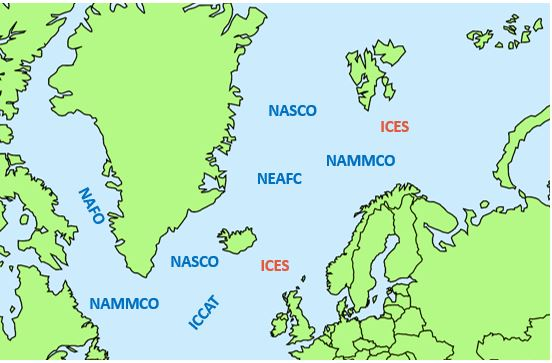
The map is indicative of the location of the many Regional Fishery Management Organizations (RFMO) (blue) in the Northern Atlantic and parts of the Arctic.

A patchwork of RFMO's and bilateral fishery agreements regulate fisheries in the Arctic. RFMO's have different regulatory competences such as geographical scope, type of species. Thus, no RFMO or bilateral fishery agreement claim competence of the whole of the Arctic or all commercially fished species in the Arctic. For some RFMO's the Arctic is only a minor part of the RFMO's area of competence. For example, the International Commission for the Conservation of Atlantic Tunas (ICCAT) covers the whole Atlantic Ocean including adjacent seas and regulate the capture of tuna species. Other agreements cover only small parts of the Arctic. This apply for example for the bilateral Joint Norwegian-Russian Fisheries Commission which regulates fisheries in the Barents Sea and parts of the Norwegian Sea and the Agreement to Prevent Unregulated High Seas Fisheries in the Central Arctic Ocean regulates the Central Arctic Ocean. The Agreement to Prevent Unregulated High Seas Fisheries in the Central Arctic Ocean came into force in June 2021.

To diminish IUU fishing in the Arctic some RFMO's have established Port State Control measures and blacklisted vessels known for not observing national and international law.

==== Denmark ====
In Greenlandic waters the Royal Danish Navy is responsible for the enforcement of fishery law and fishery agreements beyond 3 nautical miles off the baseline (sea). Within 3 nautical miles off the baseline Greenland's Fishery License Control (Greenlandic: Kalaallit Nunaanni Aalisarsinnaanermut Akuersissutinik Nakkutilliisoqarfiup) monitor fisheries.

==== United States ====
In the US Arctic, the United States Coast Guard is the service responsible for fishery law enforcement and the prevention of IUU fishing in US Arctic waters.

==== Norway ====
The Norwegian Coast Guard is responsible for enforcing the rules regarding IUU fishing together with the Directorate of Fisheries. According to the Norwegian Government, the Coast Guard's monitoring of fisheries in the Norwegian EEZ and the protection zones around Jan Mayen and the Svalbard archipelago are one of the highest priorities of the Coast Guard.

==== Russia ====
In Russia, the Federal Agency for Fishery (Rosrybolovstvo) enforces fishery legislation in Russian waters and in international waters where Russia has signed RFMO agreements.
