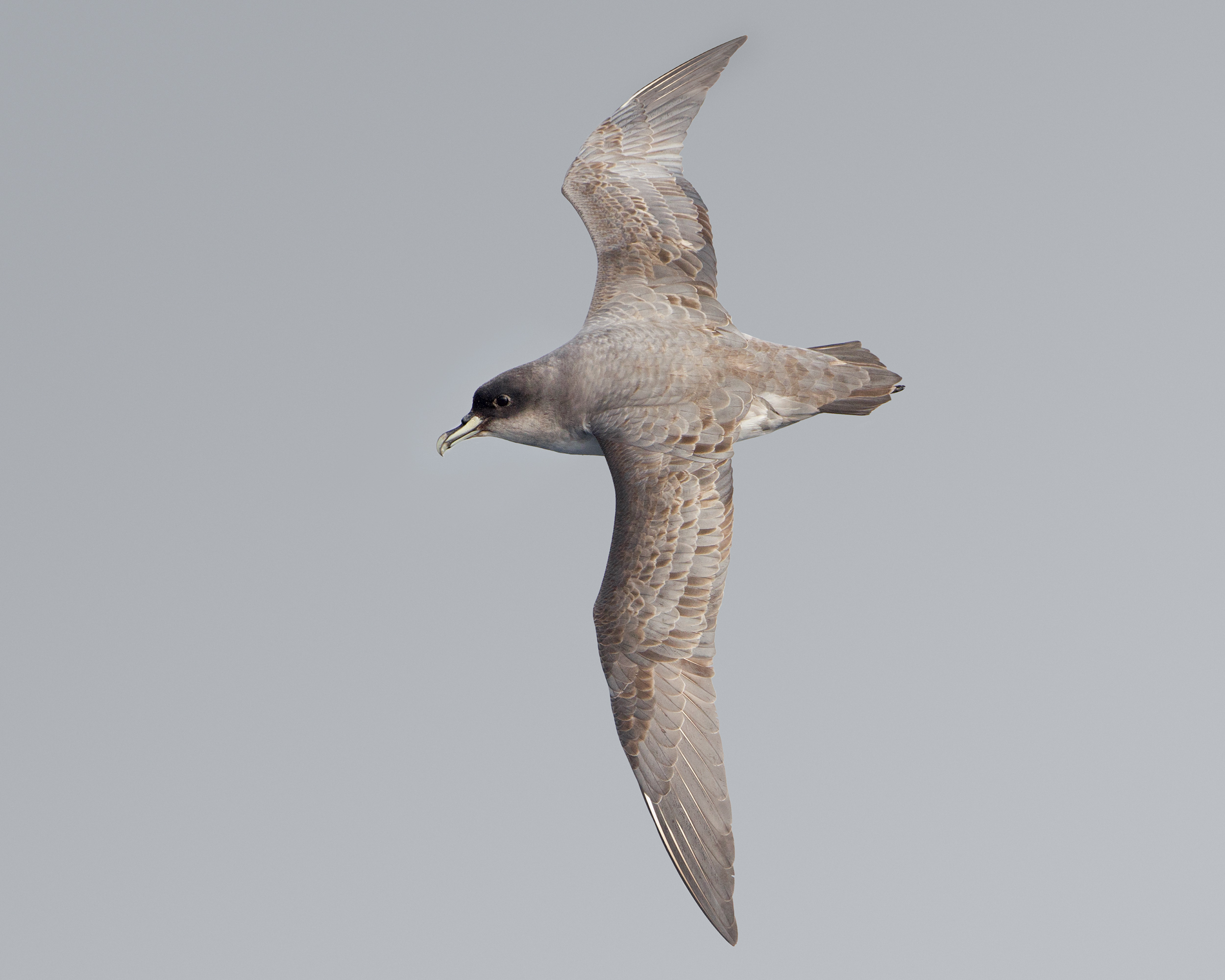

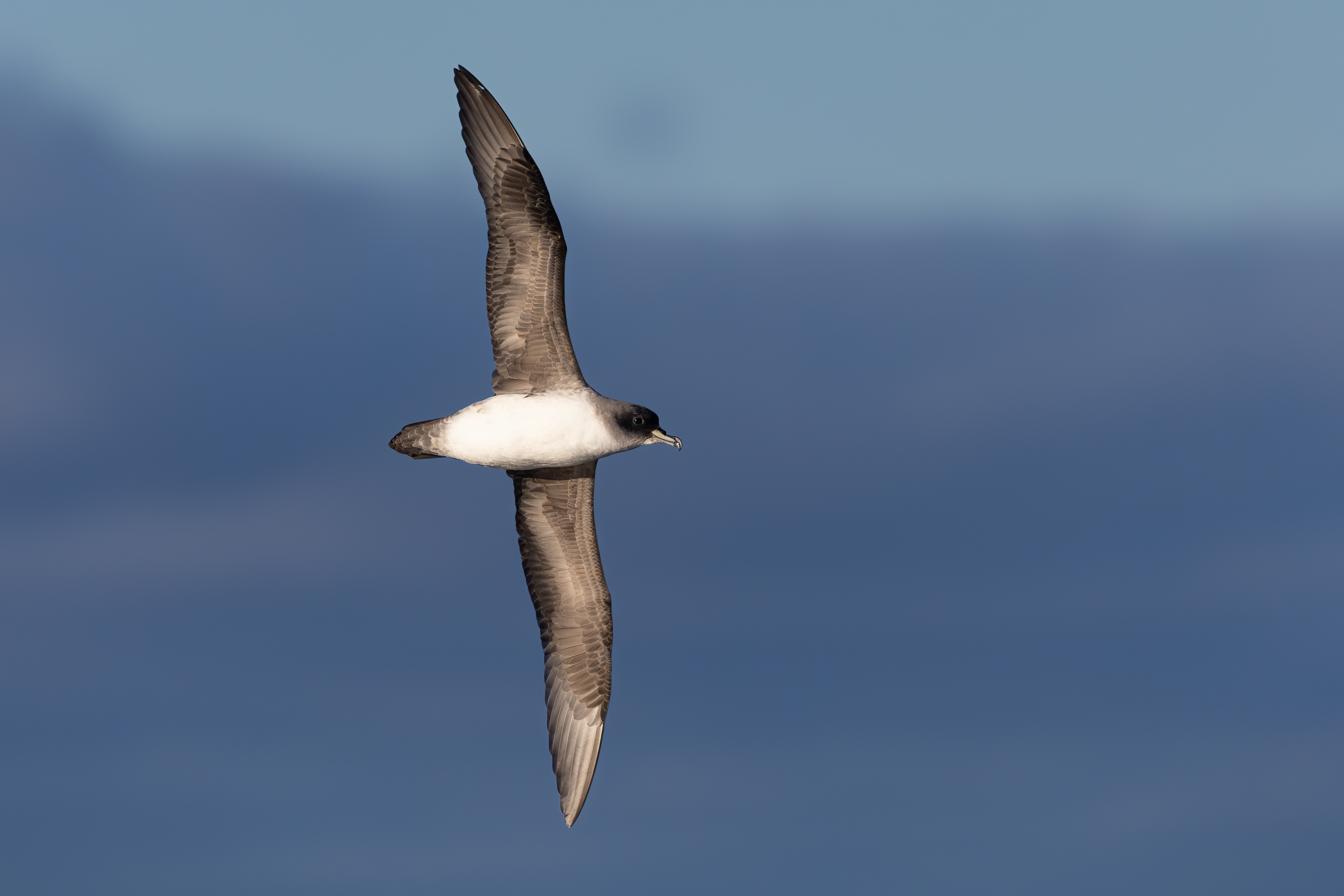

Conservation status
- Near Threatened (IUCN 3.1)

Scientific classification
- Kingdom: Animalia
- Phylum: Chordata
- Class: Aves
- Order: Procellariiformes
- Family: Procellariidae
- Genus: Procellaria
- Species: P. cinerea

Binomial name
- Procellaria cinerea Gmelin, JF, 1789

= Grey petrel =

Species of bird

The grey petrel (Procellaria cinerea), also called the gray petrel, brown petrel, pediunker or grey shearwater, is a species of seabird in the Procellariidae, or petrel family. It is pelagic and occurs in the open seas of the Southern Hemisphere, mainly between 32°S and 58°S.

== Taxonomy ==
The grey petrel was formally described in 1789 by the German naturalist Johann Friedrich Gmelin under the binomial name Procellaria cinerea. Gmelin's description was based on the "cinereous fulmar" that had been described by the English ornithologist John Latham in 1785. The genus name is from the Latin procella meaning "storm" or "gale". The specific cinerea is from the Latin cinereus meaning "ash-grey" or "ash-coloured". The word petrel is derived from Saint Peter and the story of his walking on water. This is in reference to the petrels' habit of appearing to run on the water to take off.

The grey petrel is a member of the family Procellariidae and the order Procellariiformes. Other English names include black-tailed shearwater or petrel, brown, bulky or great grey petrel, and pediunker.

== Description ==
The grey petrel is a large grey, white, and brown petrel. It averages 50 cm (20 in) in length, 115–130 cm (45–51 in) in wingspan and weighs around 1,000 g (35 oz). It has a brownish-grey mantle, back, uppertail coverts, and upperwings. The belly is white and the underwings and under-tail that are ash-grey. It has a yellow-green bill and pink-grey feet.

As a member of the Procellariiformes, it shares that order's identifying features. First, these birds have nasal passages called naricorns that attach to the upper bill. The bills of Procellariiformes are also unique in that they are split into between seven and nine horny plates. The birds produce a stomach oil made up of wax esters and triglycerides that is stored in the proventriculus. This can be sprayed out of their mouths as a defence against predators and as an energy-rich food source for chicks and for the adults during their long flights. Finally, they also have a salt gland that is situated above the nasal passage and helps desalinate their bodies, due to the high amount of ocean water that they imbibe. It excretes a high-salinity solution from the nose.

== Distribution and habitat ==
Grey petrels are pelagic and typically stay between 32°S and 58°S during the non-breeding season. During the breeding season, they form colonies on several islands. Antipodes Island, with an estimate of 53,000 pairs, and Gough Island, with 10,000 pairs, are the biggest colonies, with others on the Prince Edward Islands, Marion Island, Tristan da Cunha, Crozet Islands, Kerguelen Islands, Amsterdam Island, Campbell Island, and Macquarie Island. They have an occurrence range of 68,800,000 km^{2} (26,563,829 sq mi).

== Behaviour ==
Breeding population and trends
Location	Population	Date	Trend
Gough Island	10,000+ pairs	2004	Decreasing
Total Tristan da Cunha	10,000+	1972–1974	
Marion Island	1,600 pairs		
Prince Edward Islands	2,000–5,000 pairs		
Kerguelen Islands	1,900–5,600 pairs	2006	
Crozet Island	5,500 pairs	2005	
Amsterdam Island	10 pairs	2000	
Campbell Island	96 pairs	2016	
Macquarie Island	90 pairs	2009	Decreasing
Antipodes Island	48,960 pairs	2010	Decreasing
Total adults	400,000	2004	Decreasing

=== Breeding ===
Grey petrels return to their breeding grounds in February and March and build a burrow for a nest. These burrows are on well-drained ground, often among Poa tussock grass, typically on steep terrain. By late March or early April, they lay their one egg, with both birds incubating it. After hatching, the chick is cared for by both parents until it fledges between late September and early December.

=== Feeding ===
They dive from heights of up to 10 m (33 ft) in pursuit of food, which is primarily cephalopods. They often follow pods of cetaceans.

== Status and conservation ==
There is little recent information about this bird, but its population is believed to be shrinking slowly or possibly rapidly. Introduced predators such as cats, brown rats and black rats are contributing to the decline, as is longline fishing. This bird is the most commonly caught bycatch by longline fisheries in New Zealand waters, with one estimate at 45,000 birds in the last 20 years. Other predators are the weka and house mouse.

To assist in maintaining or increasing its population, it has been placed on CMS Appendix II, and ACAP Annex1. Gough Island has been designated as a World Heritage Site. Antipodes Island has had preliminary work done to start long term monitoring, and in 2007 the monitoring started. In 2001, brown rats were eradicated from Campbell Island, and in 2006, SEAFO tightened longline fishing regulations.

Planned conservation studies and measures include a census on all the breeding locations, studies on Gough Island pertaining to house mice, and stricter fishing regulations enforced by FAO, RFMO, and ACAP.

== Sources ==
- BirdLife International (2021). "Grey Petrel: Procellaria cinerea". BirdLife International Data Zone.
- Double, M. C. (2003). "Procellariiformes (Tubenosed Seabirds)". In Hutchins, Michael; Jackson, Jerome A.; Bock, Walter J.; Olendorf, Donna (eds.). Grzimek's Animal Life Encyclopedia. Vol. 8 Birds I Tinamous and Ratites to Hoatzins. Joseph E. Trumpey, Chief Scientific Illustrator (2nd ed.). Farmington Hills, MI: Gale Group. pp. 107–111. ISBN 0-7876-5784-0.
- Ehrlich, Paul R.; Dobkin, David, S.; Wheye, Darryl (1988). The Birders Handbook (First ed.). New York, NY: Simon & Schuster. pp. 29–31. ISBN 0-671-65989-8.
- Gotch, A. F. (1995) [1979]. "Albatrosses, Fulmars, Shearwaters, and Petrels". Latin Names Explained A Guide to the Scientific Classifications of Reptiles, Birds & Mammals. New York, NY: Facts on File. p. 192. ISBN 0-8160-3377-3.
