= Regional fishery body =

Type of international organization

A regional fishery body (RFB) is a type of international organization that is part of an international fishery agreement or arrangement to cooperate on the sustainable use and conservation of marine living resources (fish and marine mammals) and/or the development of marine capture fisheries whose such capacity has been recognized by the UN Food and Agriculture Organization under the United Nations Fish Stocks Agreement.

These entities encompass a multifaceted array of functions, including the systematic gathering, analysis, and dissemination of pertinent data. Additionally, they serve as a pivotal hub for the coordination of fisheries management endeavors through collaborative schemes and mechanisms. Furthermore, these entities assume the role of a technical and policy forum, wherein deliberations transpire and decisions are rendered concerning matters germane to the conservation, management, development, and judicious utilization of fisheries resources.

== Overview ==
Certain Regional Fishery Bodies (RFBs) wield the authority to enact regulatory measures upon their member states. Consequently, an RFB is classified as one of the following two types:

- regional fishery management organisation (RFMO)
- regional fishery advisory body (RFAB)

RFABs issue non-binding recommendations only, but they are usually organised as more independent, impartial expert bodies, expected to be guided by science and sustainability rather than the immediate political and economic interests of its members. RFMOs are in turn more politicised, but their decisions are binding for the members and subject to enforcement. Therefore, the usually environment-focused recommendations issued by the relatively independent RFABs often constitute the scientific input to the RMFOs, where they are subject to political negotiations between the members, to adjust them to social and economic reality and to translate them into politically acceptable and tenable binding decisions, which the RMFOs subsequently enforce. In some regions where there are only a few actors and they are willing to cooperate on a non-confrontational basis, they may choose to establish a regional fishery management arrangement (RFMA) exercised directly by them rather than to form a more expensive incorporated RFMO. The difference between an RFMO and an RFMA is that the former has established a Secretariat that operates under a governing body of Member States and the latter does not.

== Regional fishery management organisation ==
A regional fishery management organisation (RFMO) is a type of RFB entrusted with sustainable management of fish stocks in a particular region, or of highly migratory species. RFMOs coalesce through the collaboration of nations demonstrating pronounced fishing interests within specific geographic domains. These encompass coastal states whose maritime territories encompass at least a segment of a formally acknowledged fish population, alongside "distant water fishing nations" (DWFN), whose fleets venture to regions where a fish stock is situated. These entities are designed to be inclusive, extending accessibility to nations whose fishing fleets have historically engaged in activities within those delineated areas or exhibit a vested interest in participating in such endeavors. Integral to the paradigm of fisheries management, RFMOs assume a paramount and indispensable position within the realm of international fisheries law—a specialized domain within international law dedicated to the conservation, management, and/or development of marine capture fisheries. This legal framework comprises substantive norms encompassing rights, duties, and objectives, substantive fisheries standards including catch limits, and institutional rules and structures delineating mandates and decision-making procedures. Positioned within the purview of public international law, international fisheries law can be construed as a subset of the broader field of international maritime law. Significance of RFMOs emanates from the vested authority they wield in promulgating internationally legally binding measures about the comprehensive conservation and management of fisheries, spanning both fishing operations and associated activities. RFMOs exercise the prerogative to establish a diverse array of rules governing fishery management, deploying strategic tools such as catch limits (quota), technical measures, spatial and/or temporal restrictions, and overseeing monitoring, control, and surveillance activities to ensure rigorous adherence to these regulations. Informed by the scientific counsel provided by dedicated scientific bodies, RFMOs systematically engage in the periodic review and evaluation of member compliance, thereby substantiating their pivotal role in fostering the sustainable governance of fisheries resources.

=== History ===
The genesis of international fisheries law can be traced back to the late 19th century when North Sea coastal States implemented multilateral regulations to govern fishing activities at sea. During this historical period, the United States unsuccessfully attempted to establish coastal State jurisdiction for the protection of fur seals in high seas areas adjacent to its territorial sea. An essential milestone in the early development of this legal framework was the establishment of the International Pacific Halibut Commission (IPHC) in 1924, considered an early manifestation of a Regional Fisheries Management Organization (RFMO) before the formalization of this terminology.

These initial multilateral initiatives laid the foundation for subsequent developments, leading to the formation of the North-East Atlantic Fisheries Commission (NEAFC) and the Northwest Atlantic Fisheries Organization (NAFO) shortly after World War II. Simultaneously, the International Whaling Commission (IWC) was founded in 1948, with a primary focus on marine mammals, although it does not fall under the classification of an RFMO within this context.

In contrast to these developments, the 1958 High Seas Fishing Convention did not assign a prominent role to regional fisheries bodies; instead, it relied on the special interests of coastal States to ensure the productivity of living resources in high seas areas adjacent to their territorial sea.

However, provisions within the United Nations Convention on the Law of the Sea (UNCLOS) addressing transboundary fish stocks and high-seas fishing, coupled with the subsequent Fish Stocks Agreement, emphasized a more significant role for cooperation through subregional and regional organizations, commonly referred to as RFMO. These agreements underscored the importance of regional collaboration in the effective management of high-seas fisheries.

The principal global treaty about Regional Fisheries Management Organizations (RFMOs) is the United Nations Fish Stocks Agreement (UNFSA) of 1995, which came into effect in 2001. This accord significantly enhanced the legal framework governing regional cooperation and underscored the pivotal role of RFMOs as instrumental mechanisms for states to fulfill their obligations in safeguarding and overseeing fish populations. Central to its provisions is the stipulation that exclusive access to the pertinent fishery resources is granted solely to countries that are members of the relevant organization or those that explicitly commit to implementing the organization's prescribed procedures.

Currently, RFMOs are recognized as the principal institutions in the domain of international fisheries law. This acknowledgment is based not only on the geographical distribution of numerous fish stocks but also on proactive measures initiated within these organizations. Innovations within RFMO, such as the ecosystem approach to fisheries (EAF) management outlined in the Convention on the Conservation of Antarctic Marine Living Resources (CAMLR), have been elevated to global standards, significantly influencing the trajectory of international fisheries law.

Exemplifying this influence is the conceptualization of illegal, unreported, and unregulated (IUU) fishing by the Commission for the Conservation of Antarctic Marine Living Resources (CCAMLR), leading to the implementation of the IPOA-IUU and the PSM Agreement. Despite the acknowledgment of RFMO as the primary mechanism for regional fisheries regulation, challenges persist in achieving comprehensive high-seas coverage that adheres to the minimum standards delineated in the Fish Stocks Agreement.

Ongoing efforts are directed toward the modernization of existing fisheries bodies and the establishment of new RFMO to effectively address these gaps. This underscores the dynamic nature of international fisheries law, where the evolution of these organizations reflects the steadfast commitment of the global community to the sustainable management and conservation of marine living resources.

=== List of RFMOs ===
The preponderance of regional fisheries management organizations (RFMOs) has been established with the overarching objective of conserving and managing marine waterways, encompassing both high seas and national waters. Conversely, inland waterways fall under the purview of a solitary RFMO. Two principal categories characterize RFMOs: generic RFMOs, entrusted with the conservation and management of live marine resources or fisheries resources at large within their respective areas of competence, and species-specific RFMOs, dedicated to the conservation of particular stocks or species. Notably, within the latter classification, a substantive subset comprises Tuna RFMOs, responsible for the conservation and management of tuna and tuna-like species. It is noteworthy that three of the generic RFMOs incorporate mandates that encompass requirements related to aquaculture.

Hence, the provided categorization captures the classification of the three distinct types of RFMOs:

- General or generic RFMOs have a wider remit related to living marine resources in general within a region. These organizations have a mandate to manage deep-sea fisheries in the Marine Areas Beyond National Jurisdiction (ABNJ) cover most of the fished high seas areas of the world. Examples include:
  - Commission for the Conservation of Antarctic Marine Living Resources
  - General Fisheries Commission for the Mediterranean
  - North East Atlantic Fisheries Commission
  - Northwest Atlantic Fisheries Organization
  - North Pacific Fisheries Commission
  - South East Atlantic Fisheries Organisation
  - South Pacific Regional Fisheries Management Organisation
  - Southern Indian Ocean Fisheries Agreement
  - Western and Central Pacific Fisheries Commission
- Tuna RFMOs are the 5 RFMOs managing tuna stocks:
  - Commission for the Conservation of Southern Bluefin Tuna
  - International Commission for the Conservation of Atlantic Tunas
  - Indian Ocean Tuna Commission
  - Inter-American Tropical Tuna Commission
  - Western and Central Pacific Fisheries Commission
- Specialised RFMOs manage certain other species of marine fauna; examples include:
  - North Atlantic Salmon Conservation Organization
  - International Whaling Commission

Certain early instances of RFMO were initially structured with a scope confined solely to target stocks. Nevertheless, numerous of these entities have subsequently revised their foundational charters to encompass the ecosystem approach to fisheries and the precautionary approach. These amendments are aimed at guaranteeing the safeguarding of populations, species, ecosystems, and habitats linked to fisheries, concurrently permitting the sustainable utilization of living marine resources. Recently established RFMOs, exemplified by SEAFO, SIOFA, and SPRFMO, have inherently incorporated analogous principles into their foundational documents from their inception.

This wide diversity of mandates and areas of application, and also effective implementation of regulations, opens up opportunities to combat illegal, unreported and unregulated fishing vessels, though there are also opinions that the system is ineffective.

=== Alternative arrangements ===
Arrangements represent collaborative agreements among nations or entities to administer fish stocks within specific regions, particularly addressing straddling or highly migratory fish stocks.

A regional fishery management arrangement denotes an international fishery agreement that refrains from establishing a formal regional fishery body, while the fishery management is exercised instead directly by the contracting parties, an option limited mostly to cases where there are only two actors in a basin. An example is the Baltic Sea where, due to reduction in 2004 in the number of actors in the basin from six to just two, the formerly existing general RMFO (the International Baltic Sea Fisheries Commission) was dissolved in 2007, while according to the new general regional fishery management arrangement, the fishery management tasks have been taken over directly by the two extant actors in the basin, namely the EU and Russia. Nevertheless, the sea has remained under management by a tuna RMFO (ICCAT) and two other specialised RFMOs dedicated to salmon (NASCO) and whaling (IWC).

The primary distinctions between the constitutive instrument of a Regional Fishery Management Organization (RFMO) and an Arrangement lie in the fact that the latter does not institute an international organization, thereby omitting the creation of a Secretariat. Additionally, an Arrangement may adopt a non-legally binding character.

The European Union (EU) is a signatory to the Agreement to Prevent Unregulated High Seas Fisheries in the Central Arctic Ocean. The EU's active involvement in this agreement serves as a testament to its dedication to the promotion of sustainable fisheries management at the international level.

== Regional fishery advisory body ==
A regional fishery advisory body (RFAB) serves as a pivotal entity fostering collaboration and coordination among member states, aimed at advancing the sustainable utilization of living aquatic resources. Its primary objective lies in the surveillance and oversight of marine living resources within the respective confines of national waterways. Nonetheless, a limited subset of these bodies has been expressly established to preside over and regulate the administration of inland waters and rivers.

RFABs craft recommendations and deliver expert guidance to member nations. Their principal objective is to formulate strategies that promote the conscientious exploitation of marine resources within defined geographic domains. This endeavor contributes to the progression of sustainable practices and policies within the field of fisheries management.

Multiple demands have been made in different international fora, including COFI and the United Nations General Assembly, to improve RFABs. The size, target regions, and activities of RFABs vary widely. One RFAB is solely concerned with marine mammals, while the others deal with more general fisheries and fisheries-related concerns. The majority of the RFABs have been formed to monitor marine living resources in regional waters, but eight have been established to manage inland waters and rivers. Many RFABs also deal with aquaculture concerns.

=== List of RFABs ===
Hence, the provided categorization captures the classification of the twenty-five most important RFABs:

- Asia-Pacific Fishery Commission
- Bay of Bengal Programme-Intergovernmental Organization
- Benguela Current Commission
- Caribbean Regional Fisheries Mechanism
- Commission on Small-Scale, Artisanal Fisheries and Aquaculture for Latin America and the Caribbean
- Committee for Inland Fisheries and Aquaculture of Africa
- European Inland Fisheries and Aquaculture Advisory Commission
- Fisheries Committee for the West Central Gulf of Guinea
- Fishery Committee for the Eastern Central Atlantic
- Great Lakes Fishery Commission
- International Council for the Exploration of the Sea
- Lake Chad Basin Commission
- Lake Tanganyika Authority
- Latin American Organization for the Development of Fisheries
- Mekong River Commission
- Ministerial Conference on Fisheries Cooperation among African States bordering the Atlantic Ocean
- North Atlantic Marine Mammal Commission
- Organization for the Fishing and Aquaculture Sector of the Central American Isthmus
- Pacific Community
- Pacific Islands Forum Fisheries Agency
- Regional Fisheries Committee for the Gulf of Guinea
- Southeast Asian Fisheries Development Centre
- Southwest Indian Ocean Fisheries Commission
- Subregional Fisheries Commission
- Western Central Atlantic Fishery Commission
