= European Maritime, Fisheries and Aquaculture Fund =

European Structural and Investment Fund

The European Maritime, Fisheries and Aquaculture Fund (EMFAF), one of the five European Structural and Investment Funds, is the financial instrument financing the structural policy pillar of the Common Fisheries Policy of the European Union. It was previously known as the Financial Instrument for Fisheries Guidance (FIFG), the European Fisheries Fund (EFF) and the European Maritime and Fisheries Fund (EMFF). The total budget for 2021-2027 is €6.108 billion.

== Overview and history ==
In 1977, an aid programme to improve the fish processing industries was introduced by the EU as a part of the European Agricultural Guidance and Guarantee Fund (EAGGF). In 1993, it was split off to form a separate fund named the Financial Instrument for Fisheries Guidance (FIFG), subsequently renamed European Fisheries Fund in 2007, transformed into the European Maritime and Fisheries Fund (EMFF) in 2014, and ultimately into the European Maritime, Fisheries and Aquaculture Fund (EMFAF) in 2021. It is intended to indirectly assist the catching industry, as opposed to direct payments and market interventions, which have remained tasks of the European Agricultural Guarantee Fund (EAGF).

Financing has covered improvements in such fields as fish filleting, salting, drying, smoking, cooking, freezing and canning. The Fund supports attempts to introduce new technologies to the sector, improve hygiene conditions, and also fund conversions of fish processing factories to other uses. Each country is given a target for the size of its fleet. Funding is available to assist modernisation of boats and installations, but also to buy-out fishermen to reduce the fleet size. Money is available for advertising campaigns to encourage consumption of fish species that are not over-fished, or are unfamiliar to the public. Also, grants are available to assist the industry in improving product quality and managing quotas.

The adoption of the fund was not uncontested, in particular by environmental groups, as it includes the possibility to fund vessel modernisation and other measures, which might increase pressure on already overfished stocks.

From 2007 to 2013, the Fund was allocated approximately 4.3 billion Euro for the European fishing sector.

== Objectives ==
The EMFAF supports innovative projects that contribute to the sustainable exploitation and management of aquatic and maritime resources.

In particular, it facilitates:

- the transition to sustainable and low-carbon fishing
- the protection of marine biodiversity and ecosystems
- the supply of quality and healthy seafood to European consumers
- the socio-economic attractiveness and the generational renewal of the fishing sector, in particular as regards small-scale coastal fisheries
- the development of a sustainable and competitive aquaculture contributing to food security
- the improvement of skills and working conditions in the fishing and aquaculture sectors
- the economic and social vitality of coastal communities
- innovation in the sustainable blue economy
- maritime security towards a safe maritime space
- international cooperation towards healthy, safe and sustainably managed oceans
