= Southern Indian Ocean Fisheries Agreement =

- Logo of the Southern Indian Ocean Fisheries Agreement
- Abbreviation: SIOFA
- Formation: 21 June 2012 (14 years ago)
- Type: Intergovernmental organisation
- Purpose: Fisheries management
- Headquarters: Réunion
- Region served: Indian Ocean
- Members: 10 Contracting Parties
- Executive Secretary: Thierry Clot
- Website: www.siofa.org

Southern Indian Ocean Fisheries Agreement (SIOFA) is an international fisheries agreement between a number of nations signed in Rome on 7 July 2006 and entered into force on 21 June 2012. The purpose of the agreement is to ensure and promote the long-term conservation and sustainable use of the fishery resources in the area through cooperation among the member States.

== Treaty area ==
The agreement area covers the high seas between eastern Africa and Western Australia. SIOFA is adjacent to the convention area of the Commission for the Conservation of Antarctic Marine Living Resources (CCAMLR) in the south, the South Pacific Regional Fisheries Management Organisation (SPRFMO) convention area in the east and the South East Atlantic Fisheries Organisation (SEAFO) convention area to the west.

SIOFA covers fishery resources including fish, molluscs, crustaceans and other sedentary species within the area, although it excludes highly migratory species and sedentary species subject to the fishery jurisdiction of coastal States. SIOFA also manages valuable fisheries, including for orange roughy, alfonsino and toothfish.

== Decision-making Process ==
The Contracting Parties (States that have ratified the Agreement) meet annually at the Meeting of the Parties (MoP) to make decisions around sustainable fishing in the SIOFA area. Chinese Taipei attends as a decision-maker in the role of Participating Fishing Entity.

Decisions are made by consensus.

States that have signed but not ratified or entered into a cooperation agreement and non-government organisations are invited to attend as observers.

The MoP is advised on the science of its activities by its Scientific Committee and its Compliance Committee.

== Conservation and Management Measures ==
The SIOFA MoP has adopted several management measures to implement the SIOFA convention’s objective. These are called Conservation and Management Measures (CMMs).

The CMMs include compliance measures, including a Vessel Monitoring Scheme (VMS), Boarding and Inspection, a Compliance Monitoring Scheme, Port Inspection, Vessel Authorisation and a list of Vessels identified as undertaking Illegal, Unreported and/or Unregulated fishing (IUU).

Specific measures constrain fishing that targets deep-water species to minimise Significant Adverse Impacts (SAIs) on Vulnerable Marine Ecosystems (VMEs), including the adoption of Benthic Fisheries Closures (BFCs) in CMM18 of 2025. Measures to minimise bycatch of non-target species cover sharks and seabirds, and a prohibition on the use of large-scale pelagic driftnets and of deep-water gillnets.

The SIOFA MoP publishes fisheries and ecosystem summaries following each annual meeting, which can be found at SIOFA Publications.

== Current Issues ==
The SIOFA MoP is currently developing a precautionary approach framework to provide a mechanism for sustainable management in an area with poor data.

== Responses to Climate Change ==
In 2025, SIOFA commissioned work to assess the vulnerability of SIOFA species and ecosystems to climate change. Key findings from a preliminary report received in 2026 indicated that the SIOFA is particularly vulnerable to the impact of climate change and that SIOFA species are expected to face conditions that will be ‘inherently difficult or impossible’ for them to cope with, and that ‘There is a risk that SIOFA will not detect changes until it is too late to respond’ (para 170, SIOFA-MoP13-Adopted-Report-and-annexes.pdf).

Work is progressing on the development of a climate change risk assessment framework and the trialling of that framework on key species.

== Consideration of Cooperation with BBNJ ==
The 2025-ratified Agreement on Marine Biological Diversity of Areas beyond National Jurisdiction (BBNJ Agreement) must cooperate with RFMO/As to develop and implement marine protected areas in high seas areas.

In response to this, the SIOFA MoP13 (2026) adopted a resolution to promote the objectives of SIOFA through cooperation with the BBNJ Agreement and to facilitate the consideration of RFMO’s competencies, objectives, knowledge and governance within the BBNJ decision-making process (Annex R, siofa.org/meeting-file/meeting-documents/13th_meeting_of_the_parties_mop13/SIOFA-MoP13-Adopted-Report-and-annexes.pdf).

Given the overlapping areas and the many shared members, the SIOFA MoP aligned this resolution with a similar resolution (26/XX) adopted by the Indian Ocean Tuna Commission (IOTC) in 2026.

== Signatories ==
As of December 2024, the treaty has been ratified by 13 states.

In addition, four countries have signed but not ratified the treaty.

Contracting Parties	Cooperating non Contracting Parties	Participating Fishing Entity	Signed but not ratified by
Australia	Comoros	Republic of China (Chinese Taipei)	Kenya
China			Madagascar
India			
Cook Islands			Mozambique
European Union			New Zealand
France (for its Indian Ocean territories)			
Japan			
South Korea			
Mauritius			
Seychelles			
Thailand			

== Secretariat ==
The Secretariat is based on the French Island of Réunion, specifically in the city of Le Port (formerly St Denis). The current Executive Secretary is Thierry Clot.
