= Lightering =

Process of transferring cargo between vessels of different sizes

Lightering (also called lighterage) is the process of transferring cargo between vessels of different sizes, usually between a barge (lighter) and a bulker or oil tanker. Lightering is undertaken to reduce a vessel's draft so it can enter port facilities that cannot accept large, fully loaded, ocean-going vessels. Lightering can also refer to the use of a lighter barge for any form of short-distance transport, such as to bring railroad cars across a river. In addition, lightering can refer to the process of removing oil or other hazardous chemicals from a compromised vessel to another vessel to prevent an oil spill.

== History ==
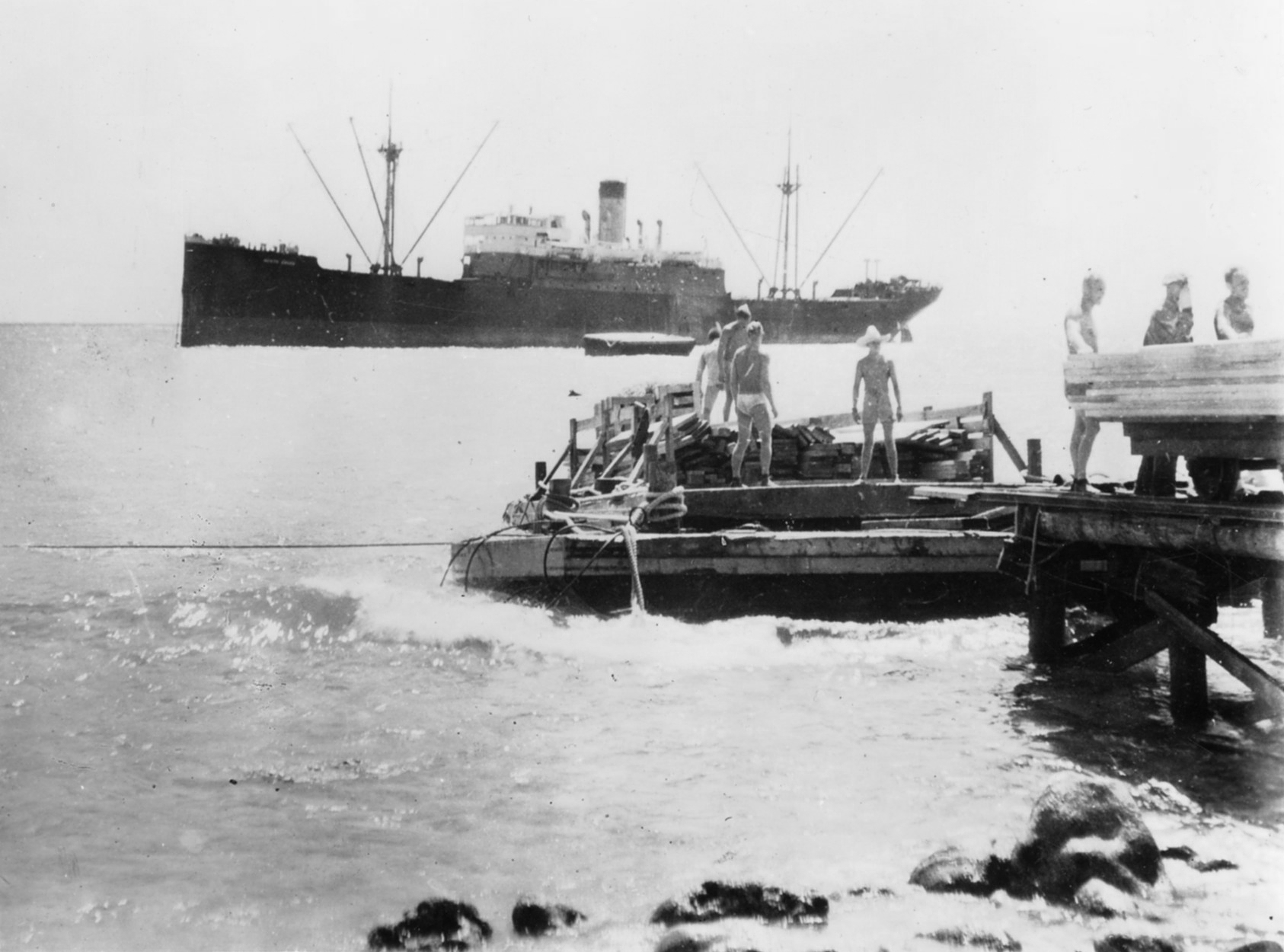
In May 1935, Pan American Airways (PAA) construction workers use a barge to lighter building materials from the SS North Haven to the dock at Wilkes Island, Wake Atoll.

Lightering was practiced for all types of cargo for centuries. Prior to the 19th century introduction of steamships too large to enter some of the ports they intended to serve, in which case lightering became necessary to reduce the vessels' draft sufficiently to enter the port, cargoes ranging from water to ships' stores (food, livestock, misc. supplies), to gunpowder and shot, were carried from dockside to sailing ships moored in harbors and roadways. Dredging, advances in dock construction, and containerization have reduced the frequency of the practice in dry bulk shipping since the middle of the 20th century. However, the practice remains in common usage in the oil tanking industry ("wet" cargo trade).

== Modern process ==
=== Wet bulk ===
Lightering for tankers typically occurs in the EEZ, generally between 20 nautical miles (40 km) and 60 nautical miles (110 km) from the shore, and can be performed while the ships are at anchor, drifting, or underway. The product is typically transferred using specialized hoses which offload cargo from the larger vessel to the smaller. Fenders are used to separate the two ships moored to each other and prevent damage while the cargo is being transferred.

=== Dry bulk ===
In many developing nations, such as China and especially India, dry bulk vessels still often lighter so they can meet draft restrictions at ports with no natural deep water access or without channels dredged to sufficient depth to allow safe transit.

In dry bulk, lightering can be undertaken one of two ways. If the vessel to be lightered is geared (i.e., supplied with cranes), then it can discharge cargo to smaller, ungeared vessels (typically barges). If the vessel to be lightered is gearless, then floating cranes are often used to transfer cargo to another vessel or barge. A roll-on/roll-off discharge facility, a floating platform, can also be used to connect the vessels.

Also, though not very common, vessels will sometimes lighter before (or even between) berthings, shifting to shallower berths to discharge more quickly and free up space for larger vessels.

== See also ==
- Transshipment at sea
- Lighter (barge)
- Lighter aboard ship
- Lighterage clause
- Lighterman
