= Benguela Current Commission =

Multi-sectoral inter-governmental, initiative of Angola, Namibia and South Africa

The Benguela Current Commission, or BCC, is a multi-sectoral inter-governmental, initiative of Angola, Namibia and South Africa. It promotes the sustainable management and protection of the Benguela Current Large Marine Ecosystem, or BCLME. The BCC was established in January 2007 through the signing of an Interim Agreement between the governments of Angola, Namibia and South Africa. Then, on 18 March 2013, the three governments signed the Benguela Current Convention, an environmental treaty that entrenches the Benguela Current Commission as a permanent inter-governmental organization.

The BCC is based on the large marine ecosystem (LME) approach to ocean governance. It is focused on the management of shared fish stocks; environmental monitoring; biodiversity and ecosystem health; the mitigation of pollution; and minimizing the impacts of marine mining and oil and gas production. Sound environmental governance and training and capacity building are at the forefront of its agenda.

The BCC provides a vehicle for Angola, Namibia and South Africa to introduce an ecosystem approach to ocean governance. This means that, instead of managing living and non-living resources at the national level, the three countries work together through the BCC, to address the problems that affect the BCLME.

== History ==
Although Angola, Namibia and South Africa each have policies, legislation and structures for managing their individual Exclusive Economic Zones, since the mid-1990s the three countries have promoted a coordinated approach towards the management of the BCLME. Following a historic first meeting between marine scientists from the three countries, which took place in Swakopmund, Namibia, in June 1995, the BCLME Programme was conceived. With the backing of the three countries, and financial and logistical support from the Global Environment Facility (GEF) and the United Nations Development Programme (UNDP), the BCLME Programme was implemented between 2002 and 2008. Its objective was to improve knowledge and understanding of the BCLME and enhance the ability of the three countries to jointly address environmental problems that occur across national borders so that the BCLME may be managed in a coordinated and integrated way. The BCLME Programme was implemented in tandem with BENEFIT, a regional marine science and training programme focused on fisheries and marine resources.

The knowledge generated by the BCLME Programme resulted in an acknowledgement by the governments of Angola, Namibia and South Africa that effective long-term cooperation between them in implementing an ecosystem approach in the BCLME required the establishment of stable institutional arrangements. As a result, the three countries established the Benguela Current Commission.

== The convention ==
On 18 March 2013, the governments of Angola, Namibia and South Africa signed the Benguela Current Convention. The objective of the Convention is to "promote a coordinated regional approach to the long-term conservation, protection, rehabilitation, enhancement and sustainable use of the Benguela Current Large Marine Ecosystem, to provide economic, environmental and social benefits". The Convention is applied in all areas within the national sovereignty and jurisdiction in accordance with the United Nations Convention on the Law of the Sea, bounded by the high water mark along the coasts of the parties. In giving effect to the objective of the Benguela Current Convention, the countries are guided by the following principles:

- the cooperation, collaboration and sovereign equality principle;
- sustainable use and management of the marine resources;
- the precautionary principle;
- prevention, avoidance and mitigation of pollution;
- the polluter pays principle;
- protection of biodiversity in the marine environment and conservation of the marine ecosystem.

The Benguela Current Convention will commit the governments of Angola, Namibia and South Africa to:

- take all possible steps to prevent, abate and minimize pollution and take the necessary measures to protect the marine ecosystem against any adverse impacts;
- undertake environmental impact assessment for proposed activities that are likely to cause adverse impacts on the marine and coastal environments;
- apply management measures based on the best scientific evidence available;
- establish mechanisms for inter-sectoral data collection, sharing and exchange;
- where possible, reverse and prevent habitat alteration and destruction;
- protect vulnerable species and biological diversity; and
- take all possible steps to strengthen and maintain human and infrastructural capacity.

The Benguela Current Convention also sets out the structure and functions of the Benguela Current Commission, including the roles and responsibilities of its Secretariat and permanent committees. These are the Ecosystem Advisory Committee, Finance and Administration Committee and Compliance Committee. The Convention also stipulates that the decisions and recommendations of the Benguela Current Commission are to be taken by consensus and that the parties are obliged to cooperate to settle disputes. The languages of the Commission are English and Portuguese and the headquarters of the inter-governmental body are in Swakopmund, Namibia.

=== Ratification ===
The Benguela Current Convention was ratified by the Government of Namibia in 2013, and by the Government of Angola and the Government of South Africa in 2014.

=== The Strategic Action Programme ===
The Fourth Ministerial Conference of the Benguela Current Commission was held in Namibe (now Moçâmedes), Angola in August 2014. At the Conference, ministers and senior government officials representing the fisheries, environment, transport and mining sectors of Angola, Namibia and South Africa, adopted a five-year Strategic Action Programme (SAP). The SAP is a wide-ranging document that:

- identifies and analyses six transboundary challenges that threaten the environmental sustainability of the BCLME
- lists the policy actions required to address these challenges and organises them into eight themes
- broadly outlines the funding required to implement the policy actions.

The SAP reflects the objectives, principles and functions that are set out in the Benguela Current Convention. It provides policy direction for the period 2015 to 2019. The content of the SAP is derived from the Transboundary Diagnostic Analysis (TDA), a scientific and technical assessment that identifies and ranks transboundary problems and proposes remedial actions. A first TDA was developed for the BCLME in 1999 and this document was updated in 2013, following a series of consultative workshops. The SAP is supplemented by an Implementation Plan, an operational document that details the activities required to implement the policy actions. The Implementation Plan provides a framework for the BCC to develop detailed scientific or management projects that help to meet its objectives.

== Regional and global importance ==
The Benguela Current Large Marine Ecosystem (BCLME) extends from east of the Cape of Good Hope, northwards into Angolan waters and encompasses the full extent of Namibia's marine environment. Like the Humboldt, California and Canary current systems, the Benguela is a major coastal upwelling ecosystem and an important centre of marine biodiversity and marine food production. Distinctive bathymetry, hydrography, chemistry and trophodynamics combine to make the BCLME one of the most productive ocean areas in the world; mean annual primary productivity is 1.25 kilograms of carbon per square metre, per year – about six times higher than the North Sea ecosystem.

High productivity occurs as a result of surface waters that are continually fertilized by the upwelling of cold, nutrient-rich water. This cold water moves from depths where there is limited light to the well-lit environment at the surface where conditions are ideal for the rapid growth and division of phytoplankton cells. These single-celled plants proliferate to form dense phytoplankton blooms. It is these episodic but frequent bursts of productivity by phytoplankton that make the BCLME a region of sustained high productivity all year round. The high productivity is, however, in contrast to the relatively low biodiversity of the BCLME. Low biodiversity has been attributed to the extremely variable nature of the marine environment at a range of temporal and spatial scales, which favours generalists over specialists

The Benguela is particularly productive in terms of fisheries resources – especially small pelagic fish – but top predators such as seabirds and marine mammals are also abundant. Commercial fisheries and the extraction of non-living natural resources such as oil and gas, diamonds and other minerals, are the focus of industrial activities in the region. It is estimated that coastal and marine resources contribute approximately US$269 billion per year to the economies of Angola, Namibia and South Africa. Angola is the second largest producer of oil in Sub-Saharan Africa (after Nigeria) and dominates the oil and gas industry in the BCLME. The country's economy is almost entirely dependent on oil production, with oil exports accounting for approximately 98 percent of government revenues in 2011 according to the International Monetary Fund.

Industrial fishing also makes an important contribution to the economy of the region and small-scale artisanal fisheries provide a living for thousands of Angolans and South Africans. In Namibia, more than 20 species are fished commercially and approximately 90% of the catch is exported. The fishing industry employs 13,700 people (2003 figures). There are very few small-scale/artisanal fishers in Namibia, but recreational fishing is a popular sport and a major attraction for coastal tourists. In Angola, at least 25,000 coastal people work as artisanal fishers, while an estimated 80,000 people – mostly women – prepare and sell the artisanal catch and are therefore dependent on fishing for their livelihoods. The South African fishing industry is very diverse. The country's fishing fleet ranges in size from small rock lobster dinghies, to highly sophisticated freezer trawlers. The small pelagic fishery for sardine and anchovy is the largest fishery by volume, while the deep-sea trawling industry is the largest by value. This fishery targets the Cape hakes. Artisanal fishers operate along the entire South African coast, harvesting a wide variety of species including linefish, mussels, oysters, ascidians and common periwinkles. Various species of seaweed form the basis of a small industry that produces alginate products and feed for aquaculture operations.

The nearshore and shelf environments of the Benguela Current region hold rich reserves of minerals, particularly diamonds. Namibia is world-renowned for the gem quality diamonds that occur along the Orange River and both onshore and offshore of the coast. As onshore diamond reserves are depleted, future diamond production will predominantly come from the seabed. Mid-water to deep-water mining operations require sophisticated marine vessels and crawlers that are capable of retrieving diamondiferous gravels/sands from the seafloor. Phosphate deposits found at depths of 180 to 300 m have attracted interest but the Namibian government has announced a moratorium on phosphate mining in order to conduct a study on the potential impacts of mining on the marine ecosystem.

Although the BCLME holds significant aquaculture potential, the industry is underdeveloped. South Africa's aquaculture industry is the most productive of the three countries’. It produces abalone, mussels, oysters, seaweed and prawns, with abalone the most important of these in terms of volume and employment. In Namibia, mussels, oysters, Gracilaria (red seaweed used by the pharmaceutical industry) and abalone are farmed, but the aquaculture industry is dominated by oyster production.

Shipping and marine and coastal tourism are other significant industries in the BCLME, with the ports of Angola, Namibia and South Africa playing a crucial role in the economy of the region. The exceptional natural beauty of the coastal regions, many of which are still pristine by global standards, has also enabled the development of tourism opportunities.
