= North Atlantic Salmon Conservation Organization =

International fisheries conservation organisation

- Formation: 1983
- Headquarters: Edinburgh, United Kingdom
- Members: Canada, Denmark (in respect of the Faroe Islands & Greenland), European Union, Iceland, Norway, Russian, United Kingdom, United States of America
- Official language: English and French
- Website: https://nasco.int/

The North Atlantic Salmon Conservation Organization (NASCO) is an international organisation established by the Convention for the Conservation of Salmon in the North Atlantic Ocean on October 1, 1983.

As a specialised regional fishery management organisation, NASCO's mission is to contribute through consultation and cooperation to the conservation, restoration, enhancement and rational management of salmon stocks with a 10-Year Plan to slow the decline of wild North Atlantic salmon.

NASCO is headquartered in Edinburgh, United Kingdom, and was formed in response to the failure of independent states to effectively protect a global common such as the salmon population. It was recognised that international cooperation was essential to prevent unsustainable overfishing. NASCO has since established various regulations and guidelines to manage salmon fisheries, including restricting fishing to within 12 nautical miles of the coast with exceptions in Greenland and the Faroe Islands. Additionally, NASCO has recognised the increasing number of countries implementing catch-and-release practices and has brought light to the proper way to manage and catch-and-release scenario in order to reduce fishing mortality. NASCO highlights the importance of keeping the fish in the water prior to release to avoid air exposure. There has been valuable evidence supporting increasing survival rates by following these guidelines.

In 2020, the NASCO operates with a budget of 636 630 GBP, with a little over 583 000 GBP coming from the member states.

== Membership ==
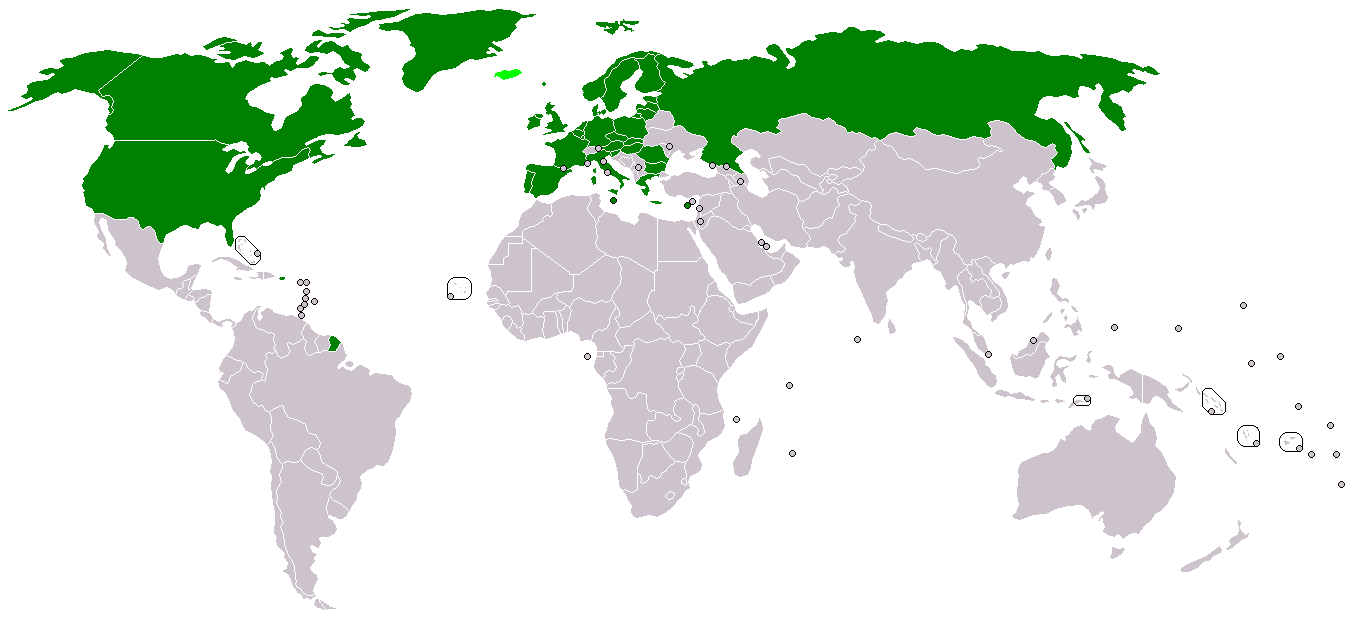
current organisation participants other convention signatories

Current participants (since 1984):

- Canada
- European Union
- United Kingdom
- United States of America
- Norway
- Faroe Islands
- Greenland
- Russian Federation
- Iceland
- Denmark (in respect of the Faroe Islands and Greenland)

After withdrawing from NASCO in 2009, Iceland rejoined the fight to restore North Atlantic salmon in March 2023.

Former participants:

- Finland(1984–1995)
- Sweden(1984–1995)

France (in respect of St. Pierre & Miquelon) attends NASCO's meetings as an observer.

The NASCO also has 34 NGOs from different member states that have observational status during the annual meetings.

== Structure ==
Council: the governing body of NASCO

- North American Commission (NAC): make recommendations for scientific research and promote cooperation among members on the issues of minimising catches and regulatory measures.
- North-East Atlantic Commission (NEAC): promotes cooperation among members on the issues of conservation, restoration, and management of salmon stocks
- West Greenland Commission (WGC): promotes cooperation among members on the issues of conservation, restoration, enhancement, and management of salmon stocks

International Atlantic Salmon Research Board: make scientific research recommendations to the Council and Commissions

Finance and Administration Committee (FAC): deals with the administrative and financial matters of the organisation. One member from each Party participates.

Secretariat: headed by the Secretary, assist NASCO members on implementation

The primary tasks of the council include:

- Providing a forum for the study, analysis and exchange of information on salmon.
- Coordinating the activities of the Commissions.
- Establishing working arrangements with other fisheries and scientific organisations.
- Making recommendations for scientific research.

== The Atlantic Salmon ==
Atlantic Salmon (Salmo salar), often referred to as "King of Fish" are anadromous fish. This means they spend a portion of their life cycle in both the fresh and salt water. Adult salmon lay their eggs in freshwater rivers, after the eggs hatch they mature for 1–3 years before migrating to the ocean.

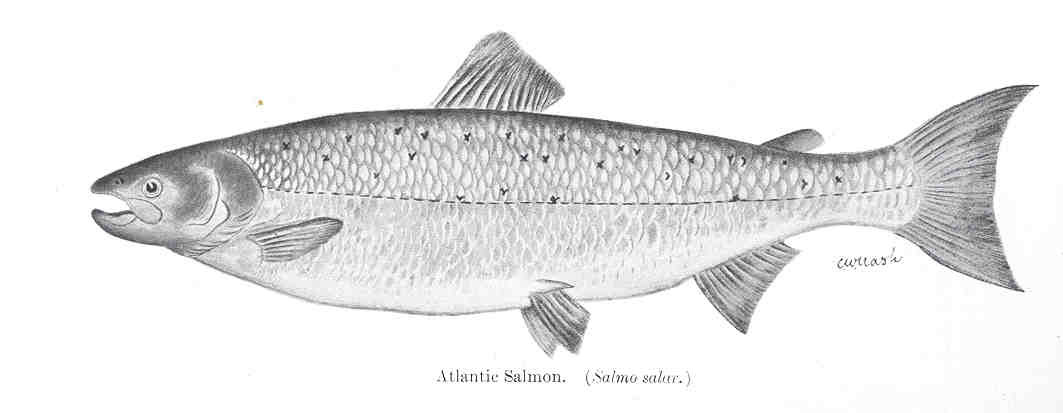
Atlantic Salmon

Distribution Map of Atlantic Salmon

=== Threats to North Atlantic Salmon ===
North Atlantic salmon face many threats that have contributed to the significant population decline over the years and have garnered the need for restoration. Overfishing has historically affected numerous species across the globe, stemming from increasing pressure of both commercial and recreational fishing. Climate change has affected aquatic ecosystems due to an increase in ocean temperatures, ocean acidification, and ocean deoxygenation which has caused alterations in salmon migration patterns. Additionally, aquaculture has resulted from farmed salmon, posing a serious risk to wild salmon. Farmed salmon are producing toxic particles leading to the transmission of diseases and interbreeding.

=== Wild Salmon vs. Farmed ===
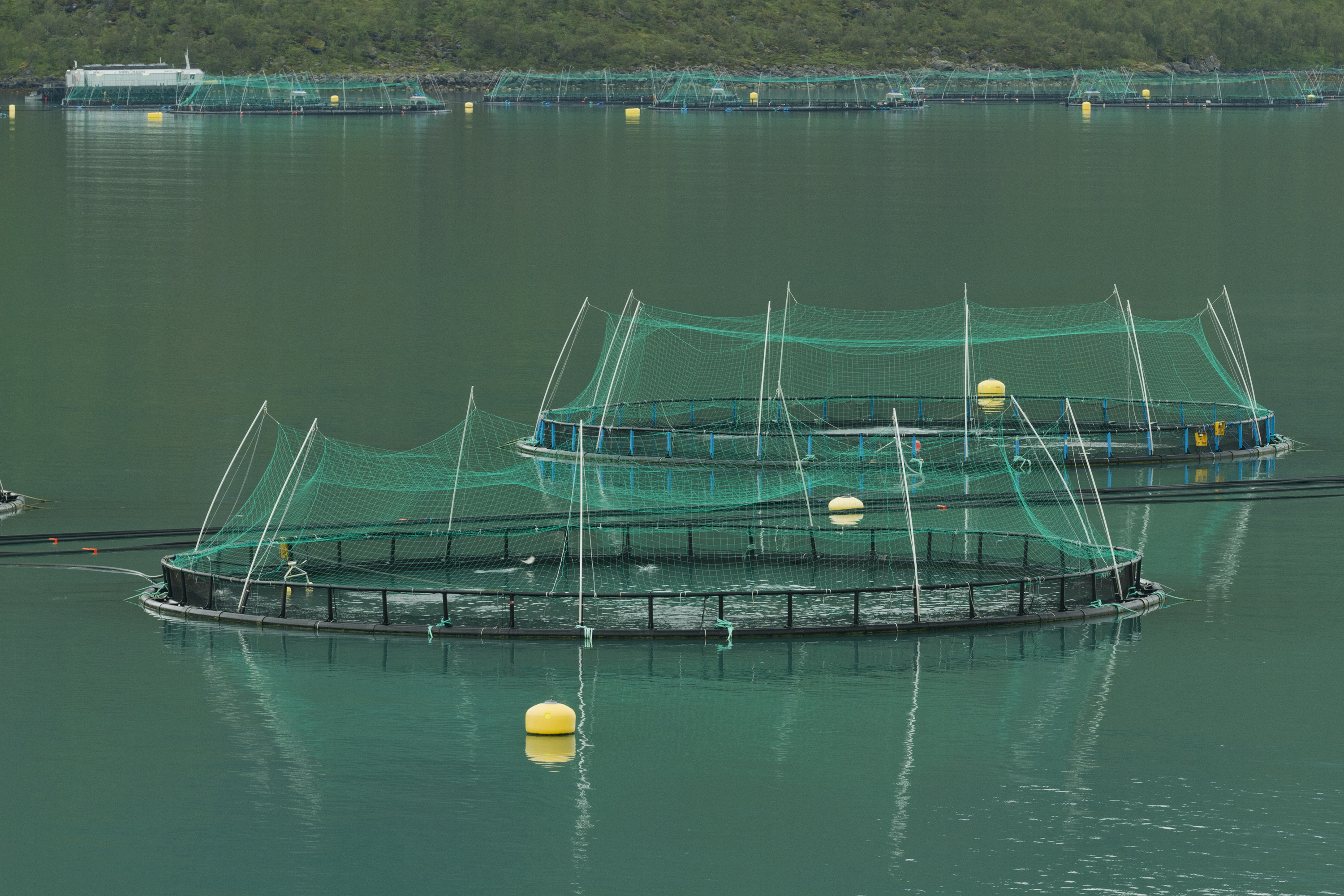
Norwegian Fish Farming Nets

As the international demand for salmon increase, salmon farming is growing rapidly in order to try and meet the needs of consumers. Salmon farming involves raising salmon in a wide net close to shore for the span of its life cycle. The average lifespan of salmon is typically three years. The salmon first begin in freshwater and are later transported to saltwater until they have matured enough to be sold. A study showed that 70% Atlantic salmon were produced through fish farming. Farmed salmon present a higher level of risk to contain toxins due to their controlled feed containing toxic particles. Some may argue that salmon farming is an eco-friendly form of protein production, however, the excess food waste produced from these farms disturbs aquatic life and can alter the biodiversity.

== The Future of NASCO- A Ten-Year Plan ==
NASCO's Council has adopted a Ten-Year Plan to address the threat to Atlantic salmon and to restore what was once a healthy, thriving population.

NASCO's has set a goal to focus on and promote efforts aimed at protecting, conserving, and restoring wild Atlantic salmon across the species' range. In order to achieve this ten-year goal, they have outlined the following five objectives:

- Ensure the best evidence-based information is compiled and accessible to address the critical challenges and threats to wild Atlantic salmon at the North Atlantic scale
- Use the information gathered through Objective 1 to ensure that guidance reflecting best management practice is produced and readily available to those seeking to take action to protect wild Atlantic salmon
- Actively promote sustainable conservation and management practices by sharing best practice and holding Parties and jurisdictions accountable in implementing NASCO recommendations and guidance.
- Raise awareness and foster broad collaborative efforts with other international organisations and civil society to encourage decision-makers, the public, private sector and the scientific community to work towards solutions that overcome the challenges wild Atlantic salmon face.
- Improve its organisational practices and work in an efficient, effective, inclusive, and transparent manner.

=== An Agenda for Action ===
A panel of four (4) distinguished men produced a Call-To-Action plan based on their expertise in NASCO affairs. The agenda contains the following guiding principals:

- Establish a Working Party to consider various ways of strengthening NASCO, including adding new language to the treaty to broaden its legal authority
- Develop a common strategy with other North Atlantic fisheries organisations for minimising pelagic by-catch
- Strengthen the role of NASCO in habitat conservation and restoration
- Make a stronger push for the establishment of river-by-river Conservation Limits in all salmon rivers
- Require strict enforcement of Conservation Limits in mixed stock fisheries
- Launch an initiative on endangered populations
- Initiate negotiations towards an international regime on aquaculture management to protect wild salmon
- Create new methodology for estimating unreported and illegal catch
- Develop a plan with NGOs for partnership in regard to prioritisations of research and funding for research on marine survival
- Adopt a new strategy for public awareness, openness, and NGO participation
- Publish an annual official NASCO report on the status of Atlantic salmon stocks

== Criticism of NASCO ==
The ratification of NASCO has made excellent strides in the restoration of wild Atlantic salmon but has faced criticism for its lack of governmental support from member states when the agreements of NASCO interfere with the country's interests.
