= Commission for the Conservation of Southern Bluefin Tuna =

Regional fisheries management organisation

- Logo of the Commission for the Conservation of Southern Bluefin Tuna
- Abbreviation: CCSBT
- Formation: 20 May 1994 (32 years ago)
- Type: International organization
- Purpose: Fisheries
- Headquarters: Canberra, Australia
- Coordinates: 35.310261°S 149.1285203°E
- Region served: International
- Members: 8 state members
- Executive Secretary: Dominic Vallieres
- Website: www.ccsbt.org

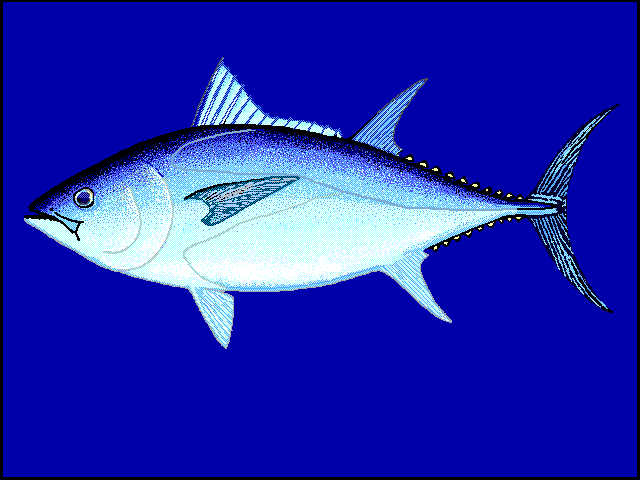
Blue Fin Tuna

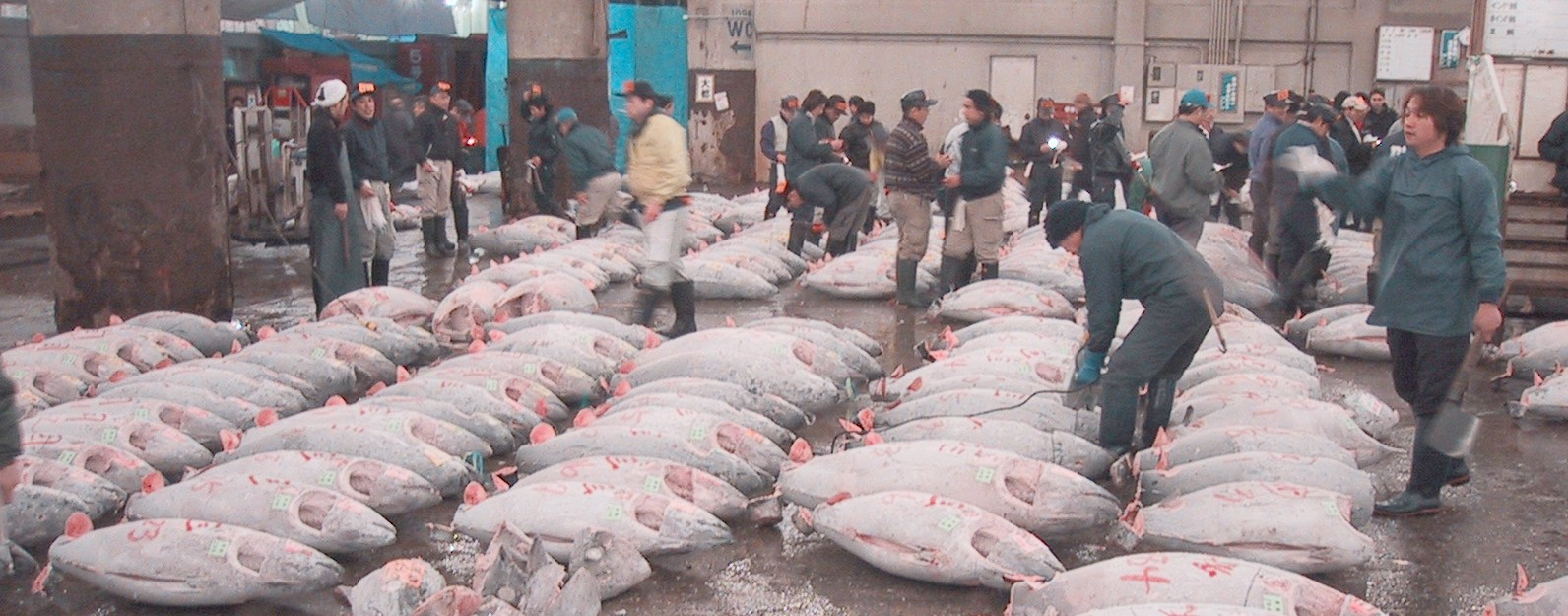
Frozen tuna at the Tsukiji market

The Commission for the Conservation of Southern Bluefin Tuna (CCSBT) is a Regional fisheries management organisation and international organization with the purpose of managing the stocks of the critically endangered Southern bluefin tuna. The secretariat is housed in Canberra, Australia. CCSBT was established by International treaty signed in Canberra on 10 May 1993 by Australia, Japan, and New Zealand, with the commission commencing a year later. Over the years additional nations have joined.

== Member states ==
Members are of three types: members (of the commission), (members of the) extended commission, and co-operation non-members:

Member	joined	Status	Ref	Notes
Australia	20 May 1994	member		Host nation
New Zealand	20 May 1994	member		
Japan	20 May 1994	member		main user of BFT
South Korea	17 October 2001	member		
Indonesia	8 April 2008	member		
Taiwan	30 August 2002	extended commission		as "the Fishing Entity of Taiwan"
South Africa	24 August 2006	member		
European Union	13 October 2006	extended commission		
