= South East Atlantic Fisheries Organisation =

Intergovernmental organization

The South East Atlantic Fisheries Organisation (SEAFO) is an organization that maintains controls over fishing and fishing related acts in the Southeastern Atlantic Ocean.

== Introduction ==
Predating the Independence of Namibia in 1990, the International Commission for South East Atlantic Fisheries (ICSEAF) was responsible for the management of the fisheries in the region both in the exclusive economic zones of Angola, Namibia and South Africa and in the adjacent water of the high seas. ICSEAF Convention came into force in 1971, with the Secretariat located in Madrid, Spain and was established mainly in response to increased levels of exploitation of newly discovered rich fishing grounds off the Namibian coast by the fleet of Distant Water Fishing Nations (DWFNs). ICSEAF failed its mandate largely because Contracting Parties did not comply with the conservation and management measures they adopted and that the Commission lacked effective compliance and enforcement mechanisms. Fishing efforts increased rapidly during the 1960s and throughout the 1970s and 1980s on targeted species such as hake, horse mackerel and pilchards off Namibia and horse mackerels (Trachurus capensis and T. trecae) and sardinellas (Sardinella aurita and S. maderensis) in southern Angolan waters. For example, in 1965 about 193,000 tonnes of hake were caught mainly off Namibia and by 1972, a peak of 820,000 tonnes was recorded, followed by a declining trend to about 338,000 tonnes landed by 1988. At Independence in 1990, the new government of Namibia proclaimed through the Act of Parliament a 200-nautical-mile (370 km) EEZ and the jurisdiction over the fisheries within the zone. The organisation became inoperative following Namibia's refusal to join it. Meanwhile, the high seas fisheries of the southeast Atlantic were left without a managing body. With new mandate and direction, SEAFO replaced ICSEAF.

SEAFO is an intergovernmental regional fisheries management organisation responsible for ensuring the long-term conservation and sustainable use of the fishery resources (excluding migratory fish stocks) in the high seas of southeast Atlantic Ocean, within the Convention Area. The SEAFO Convention Area is situated in the southeast Atlantic region, outside the exclusive economic zones of the coastal states of Angola, Namibia, South Africa and United Kingdom's overseas territory of St. Helena and its dependencies Tristan da Cunha and Ascension Island. It covers an area of about 16 million square kilometres. The idea to establish SEAFO came from Namibia in 1995 because of the concern that certain commercially valuable straddling fish stocks required better protection to avoid compromising their potential in Namibian waters as a result of unsustainable fishing practices on the adjacent high seas. The idea was welcomed and greatly supported by the coastal neighbours of Angola, South Africa and United Kingdom (on behalf of St. Helena and its dependencies Tristan da Cunha and Ascension Islands) and by DWFN's of EU, Iceland, Japan, Norway, Poland, Republic of Korea, the Russian Federation, Ukraine and United States – all of which have history of fishing or demonstrated real interest in the fisheries in the area.

Complex negotiations between the coastal States and the DWFN started in 1997 and were completed in 2000 with the adoption of SEAFO Convention. SEAFO Convention is largely based on 1982 United Nations Convention on the Law of the Sea (UNCLOS) and the 1995 United Nations Fish Stock Agreement (UNFSA) and is internationally hailed as the most contemporary, responsive instrument for conservation and sustainable utilisation of living marine resources in high seas. The Convention was signed on 20 April 2001 in Windhoek by Angola, the European Community, Iceland, Namibia, Norway, Republic of Korea, South Africa, United Kingdom (on behalf of St. Helena and its dependencies Tristan da Cunha and Ascension Islands) and the United States. It entered into force on 13 April 2003 after the deposit of instruments of ratification by Namibia and Norway and approval by the European Community. Angola deposited its instrument of ratification on 7 March 2006, making it a 4th Contracting Party of SEAFO. The role played by the developing coastal States in the drafting of SEAFO Convention was extensive.

The Commission is the highest decision-making body of the Organisation and it meets annually to among others, formulate fisheries conservation and management measures, review compliance issues and adopt the budget. Decision on matters of substance, within SEAFO is taken by consensus among the Parties. There is also a provision for non acceptance of a decision by a Contracting Party. Budgetary contributions are made up of an equal basic fee and a fee determined from the total catch of species covered by the Convention. SEAFO allows States and regional economic integration organizations to become parties to the Convention and encourages cooperation with non-Parties. Compliance with monitoring, control and surveillance (MCS) is one of the criteria for consideration in determining the nature and extent of participatory rights in SEAFO fishing opportunities. SEAFO Convention foresees the creation of a robust system of observation, inspection, compliance and enforcement that includes control measures linked to flag State duties and port State duties as well as at-sea and in port inspection, boarding and inspection of vessels on a reciprocal basis, observer programs and procedures to follow up on infringements. For transparency and openness, SEAFO accords accessibility of observers to its meetings and to its documents. SEAFO Scientific Committee provides scientific advice to the Commission on the conservation and management issues such as the status of the resources and the harvesting levels. Subsidiary bodies may be established by the Commission, as needs arise, from time-to-time. The day-to-day work of the Organisation is coordinated, administered and overseen by the Secretariat, based in Swakopmund, Namibia.

== General Principles ==
SEAFO Convention provides fundamental principles that govern conservation and management of living marine resources under SEAFO's jurisdiction. Fisheries management is based on the best available scientific evidence, and where scientific information is uncertain, unreliable or inadequate, the precautionary approach principle prevails, until such time when more information is known about the resources dynamics, ecosystem structures and functions. The general principles encompass the concept of ecosystem approach to fisheries management. In particular conservation and protection of species that belong to the same ecosystem as, or are associated with or dependent upon the harvested fishery resources (e.g., seabirds, cetaceans, seals and marine turtle)s are given emphasis. In addition the general principles call for the minimization of harmful impacts on all living marine resources and protection of marine environment and its biodiversity.

== Fish stocks covered ==
Living marine resources covered by SEAFO including fish (such as orange roughy Hoplostethus atlanticus, alfonsino Beryx splendens, Patagonian toothfish Dissostichus eleginoides, hake Merluccius paradoxus, horse mackerel Trachurus capensis, chub mackerel Scomber japonicus, cardinalfishes Epigonus species, oreo dories and armourhead Pseudopentaceros species, some shark species and rays), molluscs (such as octopus and squid) and crustaceans (such as deep sea red crab Chaceon maritae). Some of the most notable commercially important species are orange roughy, alfonsino – harvested by bottom trawling, and deep sea red crab – capture by pots or traps and Patagonian toothfish caught by longlining. Highly migratory fish stocks such as tuna, swordfish, marlin and sharks in the region are covered by the International Commission for the Conservation of Atlantic Tunas (ICCAT). Most of SEAFO fish resources are found in deep waters (greater than 500 m (1,600 ft) depth) and tend to be slow grower, long-lived, late-matured and therefore could be vulnerable to over–exploitation. Their biological and ecological dynamics are not well known and there are no good historic time series.

== Conservation and management regime ==
SEAFO has adopted innovative ways to manage deep sea fisheries, taking into account the EAF management, the precautionary approach principles as well as the reliance on the best scientific available evidence. Since 2005 and 2007, the following conservation and management measures were adopted:

- Limiting catches for deep sea red crab and Patagonian toothfish in South East Atlantic waters due to concerns on the sustainability of the current fisheries and of the potential negative impacts on the vulnerable marine habitats
- Reducing incidental mortality of seabirds, especially petrels and albatrosses, by fishing gear adjustments and other technical measures during fishing operations
- Prohibiting the "shark finning" practice whereby vessels cut the valuable shark fins off and retain them on board while discarding the carcass of the shark
- Reducing incidental mortality of sea turtles in fishing operations, notably by promptly releasing turtles entangled in fishing gear
- Implementing closed areas in numerous fragile marine ecosystems such as seamounts to ensure long-term conservation and protection in line with precautionary approach principles while more scientific information is becoming available.

For monitoring, control and surveillance (MCS) of fishing activities, SEAFO has adopted comprehensive and stringent measures including the following:

- Mandatory on board the fishing vessel a scientific observers in order to collect the required catch and biological data on the stocks
- Mandatory automatic satellite vessel monitoring system (VMS) for all vessels fishing in the SEAFO area
- Port State inspection scheme based on standards set forth in the FAO Model Scheme
- Prohibiting fishing activities in vulnerable marine areas with prominent seamounts
- Banning of transshipments at sea in order to combat illegal, unregulated and unreported fisheries (IUU)
- Establishment of a Register of SEAFO-authorised fishing vessels
- Established a list of vessels presumed to have carried out IUU fishing activities including IUU vessels that are in the IUU lists of Northwest Atlantic Fisheries Organization (NAFO), North East Atlantic Fisheries Commission (NEAFC) and the Commission for the Conservation of Antarctic Marine Living Resources (CCAMLR).

== Cooperation with other organisations ==
SEAFO recognizes the need to cooperate with coastal States and all other States and Organisations having a real interest in the fishery resources of the South East Atlantic Ocean. At regional level, SEAFO and Angola, Namibia, South Africa and UK's overseas territories in the region are working closely to ensure compatibility of conservation and management measures adopted for straddling fish stocks on the high seas and in areas of national jurisdiction. SEAFO has strong link with the Benguela Current Large Marine Ecosystem Programme (BCLME) and the Benguela Current Commission (BCC) and shares information on the fisheries and the environment.

At international level, SEAFO has working relationships with various regional fisheries management organisations, notably North East Atlantic Fisheries Commission (NEAFC), Commission for the Conservation of the Antarctic Marine Living Resources (CCAMLR), Northwest Atlantic Fisheries Commission (NAFO) and the International Commission for the Conservation of the Atlantic Tunas (ICCAT). Cooperation with these organisations is centred on the exchange of experiences on all matters of mutual interests, including on sharing of data on by-catch species and information on compliance matters such as on IUU fishing activities. SEAFO is working closely with the United Nations in particular with FAO and with the Division for Ocean Affairs and the Law of the Sea (DOALOS) aiming at strengthening high seas fisheries governance.
