= Inter-American Tropical Tuna Commission =

Intergovernmental organization

- Logo of the Inter-American Tropical Tuna Commission
- Abbreviation: IATTC / Spanish: Comisión Interamericana del Atún Tropical (CIAT)
- Formation: 1949 (77 years ago)
- Type: tuna regional fishery management organisation
- Legal status: International organization
- Purpose: Fisheries management
- Headquarters: La Jolla, San Diego, United States
- Region served: Eastern Pacific Ocean
- Members: 21 members: Belize; Canada; China; Colombia; Costa Rica; Ecuador; European Union; France; Guatemala; Japan; Kiribati; Korea; Mexico; Nicaragua; Panama; Peru; El Salvador; Chinese Taipei; United States; Venezuela; Vanuatu; 5 Cooperating Non-Members (CNM) and observers: Bolivia; Chile; Honduras; Indonesia; Liberia
- Director: Arnulfo Franco
- Website: www.iattc.org

The Inter-American Tropical Tuna Commission (abbreviated IATTC) (Sp.: Comisión Interamericana del Atún Tropical) is a tuna regional fishery management organisation responsible for the conservation and management of tuna and other marine resources in the eastern Pacific Ocean.

== History ==
The Inter-American Tropical Tuna Commission was created by the Convention for the Establishment of an Inter-American Tropical Tuna Commission, signed between the United States and Costa Rica on May 31, 1949. The Convention was signed by United States Secretary of State Dean Acheson and Costa Rica's Ambassador to the United States, Mario Echandi Jiménez. A number of additional countries later joined the Inter-American Tropical Tuna Commission. Each country is represented by up to four Commissioners.

In 2003, the members of the Inter-American Tropical Tuna Commission signed the Antigua Convention, strengthening the Commission's powers. Most members of the Commission ratified the Antigua Convention between 2004 and 2009, Canada included. The U.S. ratified the Antigua Convention in February 2016.

The headquarters of the IATTC are located in La Jolla, San Diego, California, United States.

== Members of the Inter-American Tropical Tuna Commission ==
An asterisk indicates that the state has ratified the Convention on the Establishment of the Inter-American Tropical Tuna Convention.

- Belize
- Canada*
- China
- Colombia*
- Costa Rica*
- Ecuador*
- El Salvador*
- European Union
- France*
- Guatemala*
- Japan*
- Kiribati
- South Korea*
- Mexico*
- Nicaragua*
- Panama*
- Peru*
- Chinese Taipei
- United States*
- Vanuatu*
- Venezuela*

The IATTC also has significant responsibilities for the implementation of the International Dolphin Conservation Program (IDCP), and provides the Secretariat for that program.

The first objective of the Agreement on the International Dolphin Conservation Program (AIDCP) is to reduce incidental dolphin mortalities in the purse-seine fishery in the eastern Pacific Ocean to levels approaching zero. This Agreement and its predecessor, the 1992 La Jolla Agreement, have been spectacularly successful in meeting this objective, as shown by the reduction in mortality of dolphins incidental to fishing.

During 2013 95.4% of all sets made on tuna associated with dolphins were accomplished with no mortality or serious injury to the dolphins. Furthermore, the total mortality of dolphins in the fishery has been reduced from about 132,000 in 1986 to about 800 in 2013.

=== Cooperating Non-Members ===
- Bolivia
- Chile
- Honduras
- Indonesia
- Liberia

== Tropical tunas research ==
The IATTC, through the Achotines Laboratory, is a major contributor to research on the early life history of tropical tunas. The Achotines Laboratory was established as part of the IATTC's Tuna-Billfish Program and is one of the few research facilities in the world designed specifically for studying the early life history of tropical tunas. As tunas are pelagic (open-ocean) fish, they are difficult to study in their natural habitat. Little is known from live tuna studies regarding their reproductive activities or early life history, including egg, larval, and early juvenile stages. For this reason, the IATTC established a research laboratory dedicated to these aspects of tuna biology. The Achotines Laboratory offers a unique environment for studying the reproductive behavior and early life stages of tropical tuna. While tuna are the primary focus at the laboratory, ample facilities are also available to support research in other areas of marine and terrestrial science.

== See also ==
- Indian Ocean Tuna Commission
