= Northwest Atlantic Fisheries Organization =

International fisheries management organization

The Northwest Atlantic Fisheries Organization (NAFO) is a Regional Fisheries Management Organization (RFMO) with a mandate to provide scientific advice and management of fisheries in the northwestern part of the Atlantic Ocean. NAFO is headquartered in Halifax, Nova Scotia, Canada.

== Objective ==
NAFO's objective to ensure the long term conservation and sustainable use of the fishery resources in the Convention Area and, in so doing, to safeguard the marine ecosystems in which these resources are found.

The NAFO Convention on Cooperation in the Northwest Atlantic Fisheries applies to most fishery resources of the Northwest Atlantic except salmon, tunas/marlins, whales, and sedentary species (e.g. shellfish).

== History ==
In the mid twentieth century, the fishing nations who operated fleets on the continental shelf of Canada and the United States began to recognize that fishing resources were finite and sought to establish an international multinational organization to provide for cooperation in preserving fish stocks. The International Commission for the Northwest Atlantic Fisheries (ICNAF) was established in 1950, which aimed to protect and conserve the fish resources of the Northwest Atlantic area on the basis of modern fishery science.

After almost 30 years of activity, ICNAF and the International Convention for the Northwest Atlantic Fisheries was replaced by a new Convention. In 1979, following the extension of national fisheries jurisdiction by the Coastal States to 200 nautical miles, ICNAF was replaced by the Northwest Atlantic Fisheries Organization (NAFO), established under the Convention on Future Multilateral Cooperation in the Northwest Atlantic Fisheries.

== Overview ==
NAFO is implementing a Precautionary Approach Framework to fisheries management that takes into account scientific uncertainties and thus allows for improved protection of the resources.

The NAFO Conservation and Enforcement Measures are updated annually, which include Total Allowable Catches (TACs) and quotas for regulated stocks, as well as restrictions for by-catch, minimum fish size, area, and time. In addition, NAFO imposes a number of control measures on the international fishery in the NAFO Regulatory Area, for example authorization to fish, vessel and gear requirements, controlled chartering arrangements, and product labelling requirements.

NAFO also requires that fishing vessels record and communicate their catches and fishing efforts. The reliability of these records is enhanced by the Observer Program and the NAFO Vessel Monitoring System (VMS). The Observer Program requires each fishing vessel in the NAFO area to carry an independent observer on board. Under the VMS each vessel fishing in the NAFO area is equipped with a satellite monitoring device that automatically and continuously (every hour) reports the position.

NAFO has also adopted Port State Control Measures that apply to landings or transshipments in ports of Contracting Parties by fishing vessels flying the flag of another Contracting Party. The provisions apply to landing or transshipment of fish caught in the Regulatory Area, or fish products originating from such fish, that have not been previously landed or offloaded at a port.

NAFO's at-sea inspections and surveillance scheme include frequent and indiscriminate at-sea inspections by authorized inspectors from NAFO Contracting Parties. It is the duty of flag states to perform follow-up investigations and to take judicial or administrative action in cases of infringements. NAFO reviews the compliance of vessels operating in the NAFO Regulatory Area and publishes an Annual Compliance Report.

NAFO has identified multiple areas within its Regulatory Area as being vulnerable to bottom contact gears, and subsequently, closed the areas to bottom fishing.

== Current Contracting Parties ==
Year joined in brackets.

- Canada (1978)
- Cuba (1978)
- European Union (1978)
- Iceland (1978)
- Norway (1978)
- Denmark; in respect of Faroe Islands and Greenland (1979)
- Japan (1980)
- Russia (1992)
- South Korea (1993)
- United States of America (1995)
- France; in respect of Saint Pierre and Miquelon (1996)
- Ukraine (1999)
- United Kingdom (2020)

== Former Contracting Parties ==
- Bulgaria (1979–2006, acceded to the EU)
- Estonia (1992–2004, acceded to the EU)
- Latvia (1992–2004, acceded to the EU)
- Lithuania (1992–2004, acceded to the EU)
- Poland (1979–2004, acceded to the EU)
- Romania (1979–2002, acceded to the EU in 2007)
- Portugal (1979–1986, acceded to the EU)
- Spain (1983–1986, acceded to the EU)
- East Germany (1978–1990, acceded to the EU following reunification of Germany)
- Soviet Union (1978–1991, succeeded by the Russian Federation)
