= South Pacific Regional Fisheries Management Organisation =

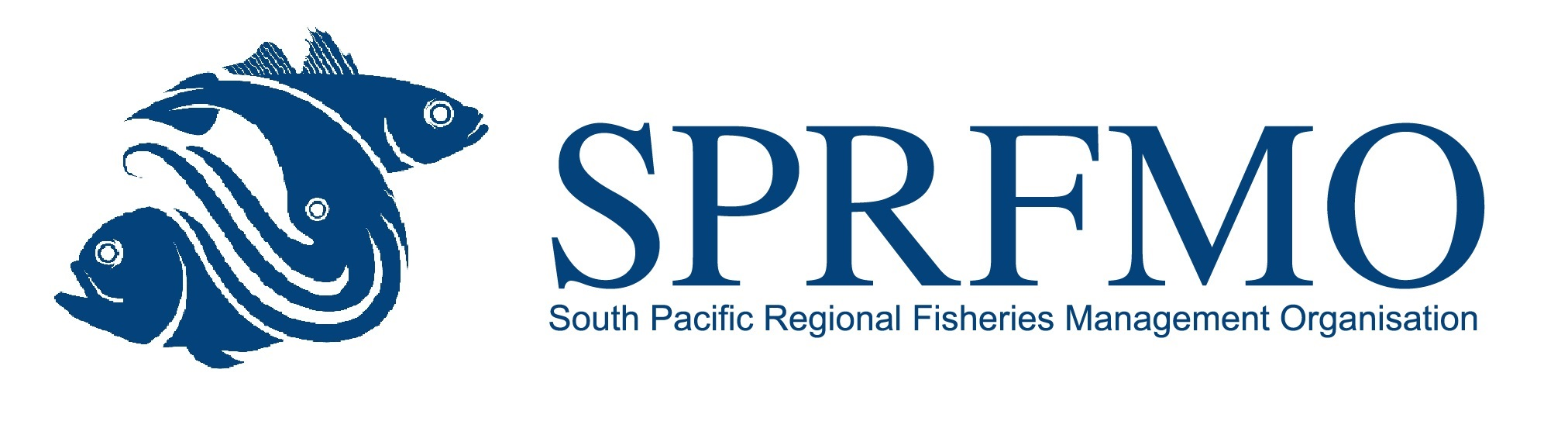
- Logo of the South Pacific Regional Fisheries Management Organisation
- Abbreviation: SPRFMO
- Formation: 24 August 2012 (13 years ago)
- Type: International organization
- Purpose: Fisheries
- Headquarters: Wellington, New Zealand
- Coordinates: 41.2858901°S 174.7726154°E
- Region served: South Pacific
- Members: 17 members
- Executive Secretary: Mr Craig Loveridge
- Website: www.sprfmo.int

The South Pacific Regional Fisheries Management Organisation (SPRFMO) is an intergovernmental organization created by international treaty, the Convention on the Conservation and Management of High Seas Fishery Resources in the South Pacific Ocean signed in Auckland on 14 November 2009.

The intent of the signatories was to commit "to ensuring the long-term conservation and sustainable use of fishery resources in the South Pacific Ocean and in so doing safeguarding the marine ecosystems in which the resources occur."

== Secretariat ==
The secretariat of SPRFMO is based in Wellington, New Zealand. Currently the Executive Secretary is Mr Craig Loveridge

== Members ==
The members of the SPRFMO Commission are:

Australia	Belize	Chile
China	Cook Islands	Cuba
Denmark (Note: In respect of the Faroe Islands)	Ecuador	European Union
New Zealand	Panama	Peru
Russia	South Korea	Taiwan (Note: Under Chinese Taipei)
United States	Vanuatu	

Additionally, Curaçao and Liberia are Cooperating Non-Contracting Parties. Angola, Colombia, France (in respect of their Oceanian territories), Japan and Tonga, as well as 15 intergovernmental organisations and 28 non-governmental organisations are observers.
