= North East Atlantic Fisheries Commission =

Intergovernmental organization

The North East Atlantic Fisheries Commission (NEAFC) is a general regional fishery management organisation that maintains controls over fishing and fishing-related acts in the North Sea, Irish Sea, Nordic Seas, Barents Sea, White Sea and the remainder of the northeast Atlantic Ocean, except for the Baltic Sea and the Danish Straits.

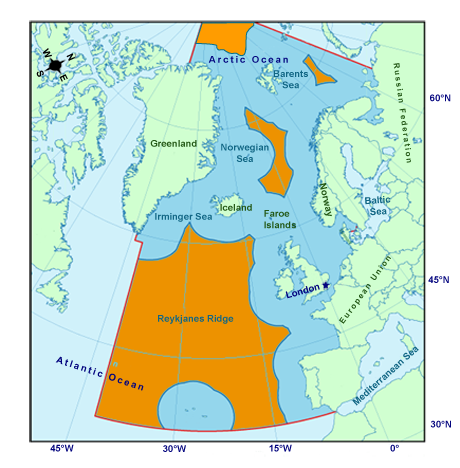
NEAFC Regulatory Area

NEAFC was founded in 1980 and established by the Convention on Future Multilateral Cooperation in Northeast Atlantic Fisheries. It replaced an earlier commission by the same name established by the North-East Atlantic Fisheries Convention of 24 January 1959. It states that its objective is "to ensure the long-term conservation and optimum utilization of the fishery resources in its Convention Area, providing sustainable economic, environmental and social benefits." The area covered by the NEAFC Convention stretches from the southern tip of Greenland, east to the Barents Sea, and south to Portugal. However, as an exception, the Baltic Sea and the Danish Straits have been excluded from NEAFC jurisdiction, being managed instead directly by EU and Russia, in line with a bilateral general regional fishery management arrangement.

United Kingdom fishing will be regulated by the commission post Brexit.

== Contracting Parties ==
- Denmark (in respect of the Faroe Islands and Greenland)
- European Union
- Iceland
- Norway
- Russian Federation
- United Kingdom and the Crown Dependencies

== Co-operating Non-Contracting Parties ==
- Canada
