= Indian Ocean Tuna Commission =

Intergovernmental organization regulating tuna fisheries in the Indian Ocean

- Logo of the Indian Ocean Tuna Commission

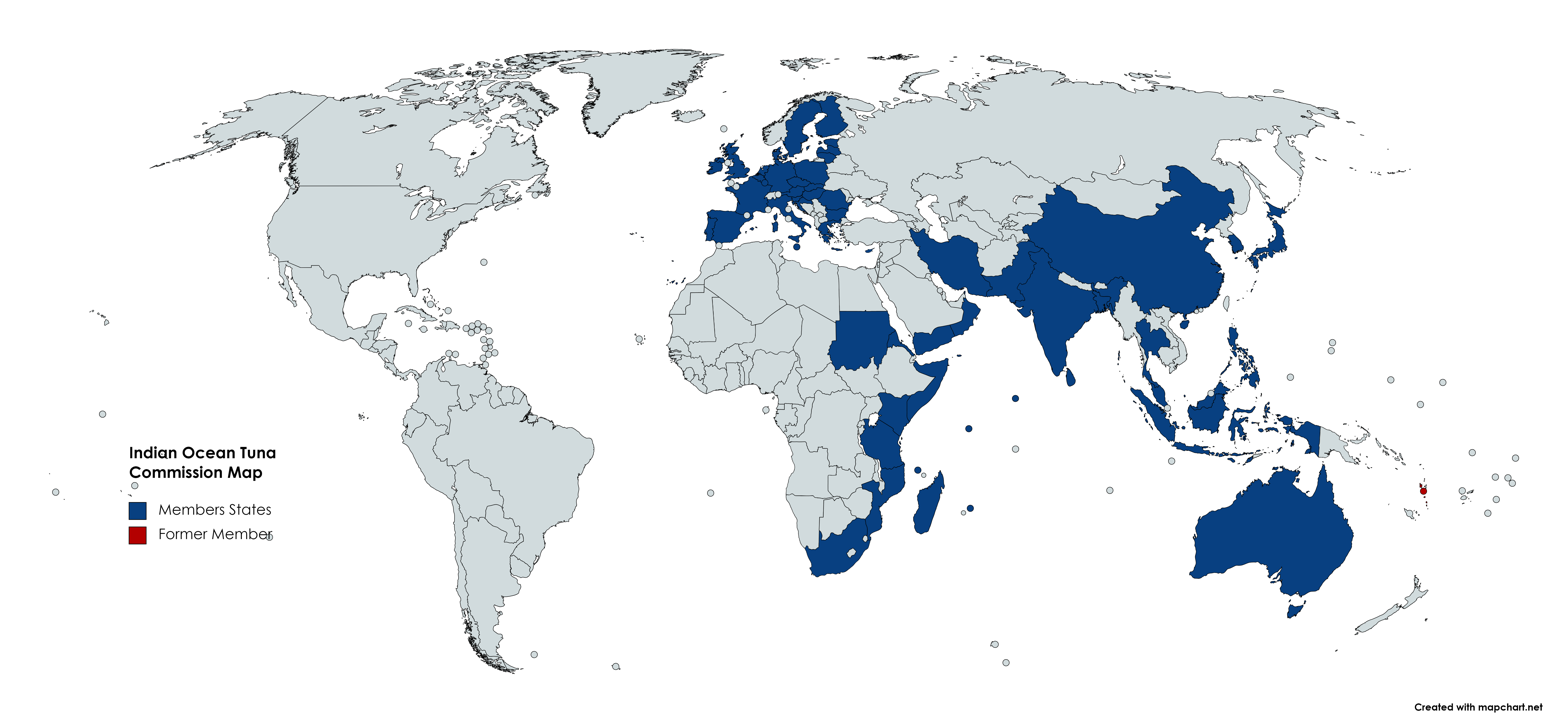
- Indian Ocean Tuna Commission Map
- Abbreviation: IOTC / French: Commission des Thons de l'Océan Indien (CTOI)
- Formation: 27 March 1996 (30 years ago)
- Type: International organization
- Purpose: Fisheries
- Headquarters: Victoria, Seychelles
- Coordinates: 4.6269564°S 55.4539976°E
- Region served: Indian Ocean
- Members: 30 state members
- Executive Secretary: Paul de Bruyn
- Website: www.iotc.org

The Indian Ocean Tuna Commission (IOTC; French: CTOI) is an intergovernmental organization that co-ordinates the regulation and management of tuna in the Indian Ocean. Conceived in 1993, it entered into existence in 1996.

A multilateral treaty, the Agreement for the Establishment of the Indian Ocean Tuna Commission was approved by the Council of the Food and Agriculture Organization of the United Nations in November 1993. The agreement entered into force on 27 March 1996 after it had been accepted by a tenth party. The Agreement is open to any state that has coasts within the Indian Ocean region (or adjacent seas) as well as any state that fishes for tuna in the Indian Ocean region. The agreement is also open to regional economic organizations.

IOTC headquarters are located in Victoria, Seychelles.

The IOTC is the successor to the Indo-Pacific Tuna Development and Management Programme, which was established in 1982.

As of July 2024, there are 29 members of IOTC:

- Australia
- Bangladesh
- China
- Comoros
- European Union
- France
- India
- Indonesia
- Iran
- Japan
- Kenya
- South Korea
- Madagascar
- Malaysia
- Maldives
- Mauritius
- Mozambique
- Oman
- Pakistan
- Philippines
- Seychelles
- Somalia
- South Africa
- Sri Lanka
- Sudan
- Tanzania
- Thailand
- United Kingdom
- Yemen

Vanuatu was a member of the IOTC between 2012 and 2015. Eritrea was a member until 2023. They chose to withdraw from the organization. Liberia is a cooperating non-contracting party.

== UK's Status in the Indian Ocean Tuna Commission ==
In May 2022, the Food and Agriculture Organization issued a legal opinion asserting that the United Kingdom should no longer be recognized as a "coastal state" in the Indian Ocean, due to the disputed status of the Chagos Archipelago. This position follows UN General Assembly resolution 73/295, which affirms the Chagos Archipelago as part of Mauritius. Consequently, the UK is now considered a state that fishes in the region but does not hold the rights or obligations of a coastal state under the Indian Ocean Tuna Commission framework.

== See also ==
- Inter-American Tropical Tuna Commission
