= International Commission for the Conservation of Atlantic Tunas =

Intergovernmental organization

- Abbreviation: ICCAT / French: Commission internationale pour la conservation des thonidés de l'Atlantique (CICTA) / Spanish: Comisión Internacional para la Conservación del Atún Atlántico (CICAA)
- Formation: 1966 (60 years ago)
- Type: tuna regional fishery management organisation
- Purpose: Fisheries management
- Headquarters: Madrid, Spain
- Region served: Atlantic Ocean
- Members: 54 contracting parties: United States; Japan; South Africa; Ghana; Canada; Saint Pierre and Miquelon; Brazil; Morocco; South Korea; Ivory Coast; Angola; Russia; Gabon; Cape Verde; Uruguay; São Tomé and Príncipe; Venezuela; Equatorial Guinea; Guinea; Libya; China; European Union; Tunisia; Panama; Trinidad and Tobago; Namibia; Barbados; Honduras; Algeria; Mexico; Iceland; Turkey; Philippines; Norway; Nicaragua; Guatemala; Senegal; Belize; Syria; Saint Vincent and the Grenadines; Nigeria; Egypt; Albania; Sierra Leone; Mauritania; Curaçao; Liberia; El Salvador; Guinea-Bissau; Grenada; Gambia; United Kingdom; Costa Rica; Cuba; 4 cooperators: Bolivia; Chinese Taipei; Suriname; Guyana
- Executive Secretary: Camille Jean Pierre Manel
- Commission Chair: Ernesto Penas Lado
- Website: www.iccat.int

The International Commission for the Conservation of Atlantic Tunas (ICCAT) is a tuna regional fishery management organisation, responsible for the management and conservation of tuna and tuna-like species in the Atlantic Ocean and adjacent seas. The organization was established in 1966, at a conference in Rio de Janeiro, Brazil, and operates in English, French and Spanish. The organisation has been strongly criticised by scientists for its repeated failure to conserve the sustainability of the tuna fishery by consistently supporting over-fishing – an internal review branded ICCAT's policies on the eastern Atlantic bluefin tuna fishery a "travesty of fisheries management", and an "international disgrace". Conservationists used to refer to ICCAT as "The International Conspiracy to Catch All Tuna".

However, in recent years the organization seems to be turning around. For the most iconic species within its management, the Eastern Bluefin Tuna, a very strict recovery plan was adopted. It is too early to judge its final outcome, but initial indications are encouraging. In general, ICCAT contracting parties seem to have agreed to steer the organization into a direction of relying on sound science, insisting on compliance and following a good governance model.

== Species under management ==
Tuna and tuna-like fishes are highly migratory, and stocks cross numerous international boundaries. ICCAT is involved in management of 30 species, including the Atlantic bluefin (Thunnus thynnus thynnus), yellowfin (T. albacares), albacore (T. alalunga) and bigeye tuna (T. obesus); from the billfishes, swordfish (Xiphias gladius), white marlin (Tetrapturus albidus), blue marlin (Makaira nigricans), sailfish (Istiophorus albicans); mackerels such as spotted Spanish mackerel (Scomberomorus maculatus) and king mackerel (S. cavalla); and, small tunas like skipjack tuna (Katsuwonus pelamis).

== Work carried out by the ICCAT ==
Scientists participating in ICCAT carry out studies on biometry, fisheries ecology, and oceanography, focusing on the effects of fishing on tuna stock abundance. They also collect and analyse fisheries statistics which are relative to conditions the management of resources. ICCAT is also involved in work on data for other fish species that are caught during tuna fishing ("bycatch" – principally sharks) in the Atlantic and surrounding area, and which are not investigated by another international fishery organization.

Based on scientific and other information, such as fishery statistics and stock assessments provided by members, each year the Commission decides on conservation and management measures aimed at maintaining target stocks at levels that permit the maximum sustainable catch for food and other purposes.

== Criticism ==
ICCAT is widely criticised by environmental bodies for having short-term policies that favour fishermen over the long-term conservation of the species.

In November 2008, ICCAT ignored the advice of their scientists that quotas for Atlantic bluefin tuna should not exceed 15,000 tonnes per year – which had been determined as the maximum sustainable yield – and instead set quotas at 22,000 tonnes. An independent review of ICCAT, commissioned by the organisation themselves, concluded that their policies on the eastern Atlantic bluefin tuna fishery are a "travesty of fisheries management", and an "international disgrace". Dr Sergi Tudela, head of WWF Mediterranean's fisheries programme, said "Today's outcome is a recipe for economic as well as biological bankruptcy with the European Union squarely to blame. ICCAT's string of successive failures leaves us little option now but to seek effective remedies through trade measures and extending the boycott of retailers, restaurants, chefs and consumers".

In November 2009, ICCAT's scientific advisors announced that a total ban on international trade in Atlantic bluefin tuna was justified, based on the decline in the bluefin fishery population to less than 15% of its original size. However, later in the same month, ICCAT recommended catch quotas of 13,500 tonnes per year. This was met by sharp criticisms from environmental organisations, and prompted calls for alternative methods to regulate Atlantic bluefin fisheries, such as protection under CITES. Susan Lieberman, Director of International Policy for the Pew Environment Group said

Since its inception, the International Commission for the Conservation of Atlantic Tunas has been driven by short-term commercial fishing interests, not the conservation ethic implied by its name....ICCAT's actions and inactions highlight the need to take these issues to CITES—the Convention on International Trade in Endangered Species. The ICCAT fisheries managers have shown scant interest in the long-term preservation of the key resources they are supposed to manage. It is now time to turn to other bodies to seek the needed protections that ICCAT has failed to provide.

The US National Oceanic and Atmospheric Administration (NOAA) released a statement with strongly worded criticism, saying that the new agreement was "a marked improvement over the current rules, but it is insufficient to guarantee the long-term viability of either the fish or the fishery".

== Recent developments ==
In recent years ICCAT adopted a draconic recovery plan for Atlantic bluefin tuna in the eastern portion of their range, which led to the reduction of the total allowable catches from 27,500 in 2007 to 13,400 tons in 2014.

Apart from reduced total allowable catches, the recovery plan also introduced strict monitoring, reporting, and control measures. Over the years the plan seemed to produce results and recently earlier critics have welcomed the plan and the action undertaken by ICCAT.

In November 2012 Susan Lieberman, international policy director of Pew Environment Group stated that "It is encouraging that ICCAT listened to the recommendations of its own scientists and agreed to keep catch limits for bluefin tuna within their advice. This decision will give this depleted species a fighting chance to continue on the path to recovery after decades of overfishing and mismanagement".

In November 2013 Dr Sergi Tudela, Head of Fisheries at WWF Mediterranean said: “WWF congratulates ICCAT member countries for sticking to science again this year regarding bluefin tuna quotas in the East Atlantic and Mediterranean. This is a good sign of the credibility of ICCAT. However, failure to address countries’ failure to comply with rules remains an issue of grave concern”.
