= Levy board =

In the United Kingdom, a levy board is a statutory body funded by a compulsory levy on business activities from within a specific industry.

These include:

- the Horserace Betting Levy Board, often simply known as the Levy Board
- the Agriculture and Horticulture Development Board
- the Engineering Construction Industry Training Board

Past levy bodies have included:

- the British Potato Council (formerly the Potato Marketing Board)
- the Home-Grown Cereals Authority
- the Horticulture Development Council
- the Meat and Livestock Commission
- the Milk Development Council

all of which were replaced by the Agriculture and Horticulture Development Board.
