= National Animal Disease Information Service =

British veterinary organisation

The National Animal Disease Information Service (NADIS) is a British veterinary organisation that limits the spread of animal diseases; it is partly government-funded.

== History ==
NADIS was formed in 1995 to look at disease prevention in cattle, sheep and pigs.

== Function ==
Each month it publishes a Parasite Forecast for British farmers.

== Structure ==
It is headquartered in west Wales.

=== Funding ===
Organisations that fund NADIS include Quality Meat Scotland (QMS) and AHDB Beef and Lamb (former EBLEX)
