= No-deal Brexit =

Potential withdrawal of the UK from the EU without an agreement

A no-deal Brexit (also called a clean-break Brexit) was the potential withdrawal of the United Kingdom (UK) from the European Union (EU) without a withdrawal agreement. Under Article 50 of the Maastricht Treaty, the Treaties of the European Union would have ceased to apply once a withdrawal agreement was ratified or if the two years had passed since a member state had indicated its will to leave the European Union. The two-year period could have been extended by unanimous consent from all member states, including the member state that was wishing to leave the European Union.

Without such an agreement in place at the end of the period specified in Article 50, EU law and other agreements would have ceased to apply to the established interactions between the UK and the rest of the EU. Additionally, British interactions with non-EU countries that had been governed by EU agreements with those countries may have needed to be renegotiated, as well.

Short-term (90-day) cross-border travel for tourism was expected to continue as before, albeit with some inconvenience to aviation schedules. While trading of goods (though not services) could have continued to operate under World Trade Organization (WTO) most favoured nation rules, some significant disruption to established trade flows was anticipated and the UK and the EU had prepared agreements and (short-term) understandings for the more serious risks anticipated to arise. Operation Yellowhammer was the codename used by HM Treasury for cross-government civil contingency planning for the possibility of a no-deal Brexit.

A renegotiated withdrawal agreement was ratified by Parliament in January 2020, and Brexit occurred at 23:00 GMT on 31 January 2020 (00:00 CET on 1 February). A Brexit transition period began at that point, to allow the sides to negotiate a trade agreement and to give time for the sides to prepare for the consequences of that agreement.

On 24 December 2020, the President of the European Commission and the Prime Minister of the UK agreed in principle to a draft EU–UK Trade and Cooperation Agreement. The Parliament of the United Kingdom ratified this agreement on 30 December 2020 and the European Parliament ratified it in late April 2021. The EU and UK agreed to apply the draft agreement with effect from 1 January 2021.

== Events of 2019 ==
In May 2019, the Speaker of the House of Commons, John Bercow, advised that while a no-deal exit on 31 October 2019 was the current default position in law, it was not credible that Parliament could be deprived of the right to intervene should it wish to do so.

In July 2019 Boris Johnson became Prime Minister of the United Kingdom and Leader of the Conservative Party. The Department for Exiting the European Union, which had previously been responsible for Brexit negotiations, was refocused to concentrate on no-deal planning, with an additional £1 billion in funding for preparations for a no-deal Brexit. Johnson appointed Michael Gove to the Cabinet with the responsibility for co-ordination of planning across Government Departments for a no-deal Brexit, declaring that Gove would "turbo-charge" the UK's preparations for a no-deal Brexit on 31 October.

In August 2019, The Guardian reported that British diplomats would pull out from the EU's decision making meetings "within days", under plans being drawn up by Downing Street. That newspaper also said in the same month that any attempt to bypass MPs could create a constitutional crisis. On 21 August 2019, Angela Merkel offered and Boris Johnson accepted a suggestion that the British Government should come up with a viable alternative to the backstop, and on the same day the President of France Emmanuel Macron indicated that no deal was the most likely Brexit outcome due to the inability of the UK to accept the withdrawal agreement. At an interview with the BBC at the 45th G7 summit in late August 2019 Johnson suggested that the chances of achieving a Brexit deal were now "touch and go". He had previously stated that the odds of a no-deal exit were "a million to one". On 28 August 2019, the Johnson ministry reopened negotiations on the withdrawal agreement, but set as a pre-condition that the Irish backstop must be scrapped before doing so, a condition to which the EU had declared it would not agree.

On 30 October 2019, the day named as "exit day" in British legislation was changed to 31 January 2020 at 11.00 p.m.

== Projected consequences of a no-deal Brexit ==
=== Budget contributions and divorce bill ===
The UK's recurrent contributions to the EU budget would have ceased. (A House of Commons briefing paper issued in June 2016 stated that the average net contribution for the years 2013 to 2017 was £7.9 billion per annum.) The withdrawal agreement negotiated by Prime Minister Theresa May included an understanding that the UK would need to pay a "divorce" bill of £39 billion for previous and long-term commitments. On 25 August 2019 it was reported that a British government legal team had advised that the amount due should a no-deal Brexit eventuate would be £9 billion and possibly as low as £7 billion.

=== Economy ===
Analysis by the Treasury in 2016 predicted that a no-deal Brexit, whereby the UK left the EU and traded with the EU only on WTO terms without any new deals being negotiated, would have resulted in a 7.5% decrease in GDP after 15 years for the UK (relative to where it would otherwise have been were the UK to have remained a member of the EU). In April 2019 the International Monetary Fund published analysis showing that, in the event of a no-deal Brexit occurring during 2019, the UK's GDP would be 3.5% smaller by 2021 than it would have been had a withdrawal agreement been made during that year (2019). The IMF also predicted a 0.5% reduction in GDP relative to where it otherwise would have been for the rest of the EU by 2021 as a result of a no-deal Brexit. In June 2019 the Office of Budget Responsibility published analysis predicting that the economy would shrink by 2% of GDP by 2021 if a no-deal Brexit occurred during 2019, but where the UK's exit was not "disruptive or disorderly".

Economists at think tank The Policy Exchange criticised the Treasury, IMF and OECD forecasts for their reliance on a gravity model with what they said were incorrect assumptions. Specifically, these forecasts relied on the comparison between firstly the average gain in trade between EU countries and secondly the average gain in trade between EU countries and the rest of the world. For example, the Treasury's forecast showed that trade in goods had increased 115% more between EU countries compared to trade between the EU and the rest of the world over the timeline of the EU. The authors pointed to various problems with this, including that 115% was the average across all EU countries and UK-specific analysis leads to significantly lower number in the 20% to 30% range, that currency fluctuations should have reduced some of the impact of this, and that British exports to the EU as a percentage of its total exports had been falling rapidly since 1999.

In 2016 Patrick Minford predicted that a 'Britain Alone' scenario in which Britain left the EU, traded with the EU only on WTO terms, and unilaterally removed all tariffs, would result in a gain of 4% of GDP relative to where it would otherwise have been had the UK remained in the EU. Thomas Sampson, Swati Dhingra, Gianmarco Ottaviano and John Van Reenen of the Centre for Economic Performance criticised this analysis as being based on outdated information and analytical models, and unjustified assumptions.

A report prepared by the Central Bank of Ireland in August 2019 indicated that the City of London would be "largely unaffected" by a hard Brexit, even if it were to have an "adverse" impact on the rest of the country. The report said that the City's financial services industry was sufficiently strong to withstand the impact of a no-deal Brexit and would remain "rich".

=== Freedom of movement ===
Under the EU Single Market, freedom of movement allowed EU citizens to travel, live and work in any other member state. This freedom would have been curtailed by a no-deal Brexit, but in early September 2019 it became clear that Home Secretary Priti Patel would announce a liberalisation of rules such that in the event of a no-deal Brexit EU citizens arriving and joining the Settlement Register by the end of 2020 would be able to remain in the UK until 31 December 2023.

=== Ireland ===
The economies of both parts of Ireland were expected to be seriously affected by a no-deal Brexit.

=== Motor industry ===
On 28 July 2019, Groupe PSA (owners of Vauxhall Motors) told the Financial Times that a no-deal Brexit could, if Brexit makes it unprofitable, result in the closure of its Ellesmere Port plant, with serious consequential impact on local suppliers.

=== Sheep farming ===
On 30 July 2019, Helen Roberts of the National Sheep Association in Wales told The Guardian that it would be "absolutely catastrophic" to leave with no-deal and could lead to civil unrest among sheep farmers. Minette Batters, the president of the National Farmers Union, said there would be no market for 40% of the UK's lamb meat in the event of a no-deal Brexit. The Guardian also reported research commissioned by the Agriculture and Horticulture Development Board and Quality Meat Scotland that found that combined beef and sheep meat exports to the EU could have declined by 92.5%, with the lamb export trade "almost completely wiped out".

Reports emerged of no deal plans by the UK government to purchase beef, lamb and some crops with £500 million having been budgeted for this.

=== World-wide trade winners and losers ===
The UK would have been able to make new international free trade deals straight away following a no-deal Brexit.

Delivering a research study on the impact on worldwide exports to the UK, the director of international trade and commodities at UNCTAD considered that "Brexit is not only a regional affair. Once the UK has left [the EU], it will alter the ability of non-EU countries to export to the UK market".

According to UNCTAD a no-deal Brexit could have impacted third world countries, including in Africa. However, a no-deal Brexit could have provided gains to China. A no-deal Brexit could on one hand reduce EU exports to the UK by $34 billion and from Turkey by $2 billion, and on the other could increase Chinese exports by $10 billion and US exports by $5 billion.

A no-deal Brexit would have had immediate repercussions for many developing countries’ exports, with the UNCTAD research raising the possibility of significant disruption and economic harm for developing countries whose exports are highly reliant on the UK market and/or were then beneficiaries of EU preferences.

== United Kingdom preparedness and contingencies ==
=== Operation Yellowhammer ===
In the run up to the anticipated Spring 2019 Brexit date, the Department for Exiting the European Union (DExEU) and the Civil Contingencies Secretariat developed preparedness and contingency plans for the possibility of a "no-deal" Brexit, codenamed Operation Yellowhammer – the emergency co-ordination plan. In August 2019, it was reported that the Cabinet Office was "not able to confirm" that Operation Yellowhammer is to remain available for an Autumn Brexit. On 18 August 2019, a leak revealed that the policy continues to exist and is being updated.

After Boris Johnson became British prime minister in July 2019, there were changes for Brexit planning. Under Michael Gove, significant additional emphasis and funding was given to no-deal preparations.

=== Transport systems ===
As of 2 April 2019 the UK government had issued 16 publications indicating advice on road, rail, air and marine transport, most of which were applicable to the no-deal scenario.

==== Surface ====
Transport links were likely to be affected by additional procedures required at border crossings, leading to possible bottlenecks and congestion. Some measures were taken to mitigate the effect of possible problems, including additional ferry capacity. Additionally an enhanced plan, Operation Brock, was prepared to cope with additional traffic delays on the M20 motorway to the Channel Tunnel and Channel ports with Operation Fennel used to manage overall traffic congestion in Kent.

It was said in July 2019 that any issues with train operators and driver certifications (to operate/continue to operate cross-border train services) needed to be resolved.

At the end of July 2019, in a statement headlined "Brexit and the UK haulage industry – no deal, no jobs, no food", the (British) Road Haulage Association said that "A no-deal Brexit will create massive problems for international hauliers – whether UK or mainland Europe based".

==== Aviation ====
Aviation would have been particularly affected if the European Common Aviation Area and EU–US Open Skies Agreement no longer applied to the UK after a "no-deal" Brexit, since World Trade Organization rules did not cover that sector, implying that the following day a British plane could not have landed at an EU airport. The British government said in September 2018 that in case of no deal on aviation, the UK would allow EU airlines to use British airports anyway, and expect EU countries to reciprocate. A number of other aviation issues existed, including pan-European air traffic control, service agreements with the EU and other countries, security regimes, and the UK's relationship with the European Aviation Safety Agency. EU—UK flights should not be affected for a time following a no-deal exit, subject to the EU and the UK respecting reciprocal rights in this area.

Post-Brexit open skies agreements were reached with the US and Canada in November and December 2018 respectively and these would also have applied in a "no-deal" situation.

=== Borders ===
The British National Audit Office (NAO) produced the report The UK border: preparedness for EU exit update in October 2018 and an update in February 2019. These indicated 11 out of 12 critical systems for borders would be at risk were a no-deal exit to have occurred on 29 March 2019.

==== Movements of people ====
EU citizens entering the UK for tourism and (some) business and tourism (and vice versa), would not have needed visas for visits up to 90 days; however significant business travel would have required a work permit for each country visited. EU and British citizens with less than six months to a year on their passports may have been advised to renew them. Passports would not have been required between Ireland and the UK as they are in the Common Travel Area. Citizens from the UK would have been unable to use the EU channels in EU airports: the EU channels at British airports would have been repurposed. An International Driving Licence and Green Card may have been required for British citizens to drive in the EU.

==== Movement of goods ====
In February 2019, it was estimated that the number of customs declarations to be handled for goods leaving the UK would have risen from the current 55 million per year to 240 million.

=== Healthcare ===
The Department of Health and Social Care (DHSC) analysed supply chain, organised stockpiles and additional refrigeration warehouse space. Medicine with limited shelf life cannot be stockpiled; arrangements were in place to prioritise medicines as key goods and a chartered plane would be available for provisioning if necessary. Each clinic and hospital had to answer 60 questions each day as part of a sitrep (Situation Report) to confirm they would have been able to continue to manage. On 26 March 2019 the Minister for the DHSC indicated it was prepared for a no-deal exit.

=== Energy ===
In the event of a no-deal exit, EU energy law would have no longer applied to the UK. Continuity of supply would have been prioritised. For 12 months until new trading arrangements, a temporary scheme would have been implemented to import electricity with no tariff. The All-Ireland single Electricity Market would no longer have applied, although alternative trading arrangements had been outlined and were being pursued, the Government stated in March 2019.

=== Fisheries ===
As a member of the EU, the UK was part of the common fisheries policy which, among other things, allows fishermen from other EU countries to access British waters (and vice versa). In the event of no deal the British government had stated that, as the UK would no longer be bound by the common fisheries policy, it could deny access to EU Member States fishing vessels, and in September 2018 DEFRA reported that issues were expected in enforcing the British fishing area to prevent fishing by non-British vessels. The EU had requested that, in the event of no-deal, short term access be provided to EU vessels, and Steve Barclay (Brexit Secretary) informed the Exiting the European Union Select Committee that the UK had agreed to stay in the common fisheries policy until at least 31 December 2019.

=== Food and water ===
In September 2018, DEFRA produced a report on Progress implementing EU Exit. Progress was being made getting other countries to accept British versions of export health certificates, especially in the 15% of non-EU countries accounting for 90% of the UK's non-EU exports. There were also concerns about insufficient veterinary staff to process export health certificates.

In August 2019 it was revealed that local government planning for a No-deal Brexit encompassed the possibility of needing to change legal requirements underpinning the provision of school meals, for example by making them more expensive or less healthy; possibly even discarding the requirements entirely. One council also said that "special dietary requirements may be difficult to meet" and that fresh food might have to be replaced with frozen and tinned goods, while another mentioned the possibility of a return to rationing.

=== Foreign nationals ===
The British Government intended to treat EU citizens already living in the UK as it had proposed in the draft Brexit withdrawal agreement, though there would have been some variations. The British Government was hopeful this would be reciprocated for British nationals in the EU. The EU published a fact-sheet detailing information for British nationals in the EU.

In August 2019, Boris Johnson communicated that he wanted the freedom of movement which allowed EU citizens to travel to the UK to be immediately stopped on 31 October. Those rules applicable until 31 October would have been replaced by new stricter non-stated rules.

=== Law enforcement ===
Metropolitan Police Deputy assistant commissioner Richard Martin stated that a no-deal exit would mean a loss of Europe-wide tools, databases and European Arrest Warrant, which would have limited the ability to detain foreign suspects in the UK and pursue British fugitives in the EU. The National Police Chiefs Council asked "prominent individuals" to avoid inciting anger and said 10,000 officers were ready for deployment in the UK in case of conflicts between citizens.

=== Banking and finance ===
A "temporary permissions regime" (TPR) was introduced so that in the event of no-deal, European Union banks, insurers and asset managers could simply notify British financial regulators to continue to serve British customers.

==== Motor insurance ====
A no-deal Brexit would have made the UK no longer party to the Motor Insurance Directive. According to Irish no deal preparedness plans, Green Cards would have been required by for British motorists wishing to travel to the EU (and vice versa) – an issue that will particularly affect the heavily traversed Irish border. As a consequence, one million Green Cards were sent to insurance companies and brokers in the Republic of Ireland alone, as part of a 'prudent advance planning' for a possible no-deal Brexit.

=== Northern Ireland ===
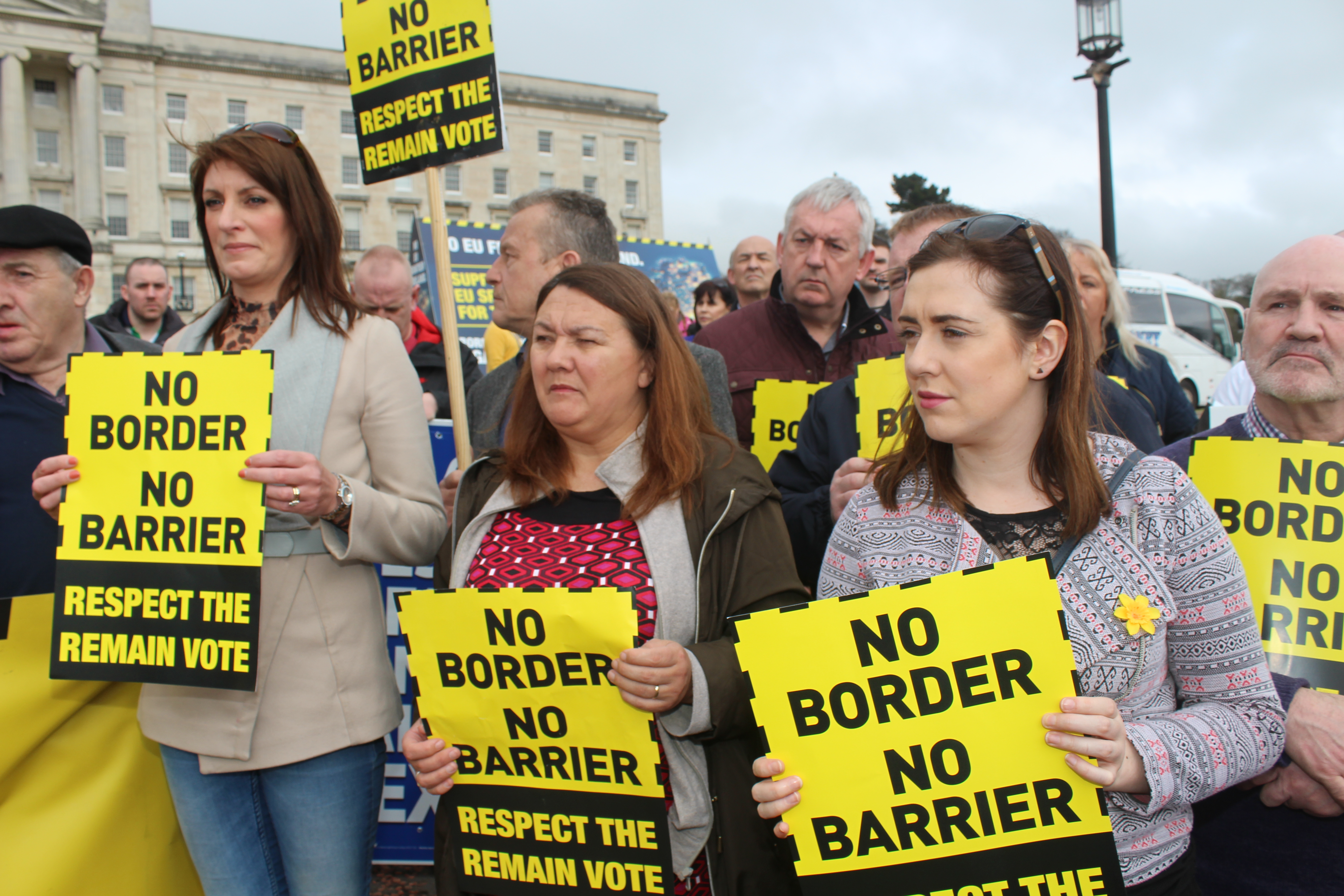
A Sinn Féin protest against a hard border. Post-Brexit border controls are a controversial issue

The UK's highest-ranking civil servant said in April 2019 that a no-deal Brexit would result in the return of direct rule in Northern Ireland.

The May administration was committed to avoiding a "hard" border (Note: a controlled border with physical infrastructure (customs, police and SPS measures) at a limited number of authorised crossing points) and honouring the Belfast (Good Friday) Agreement. However, it was reported in March 2019 that its proposed approach might have violated other legal obligations and could have been challenged. (Note: and other sources.)

In August 2019 it was reported that it was "understood" that a no-deal Brexit could challenge the question of the border between the UK and the EU on the island of Ireland, necessitating negotiation between the UK with the European Commission and/or the Irish government to jointly agree long-term measures to avoid a hard border.

A forecast made in August 2019 had an expectation of a reduction of 19% in exports from Northern Ireland to Ireland in the event of a no-deal Brexit.

=== Overseas territories ===
The EU intended to define Gibraltar (in British law, 'a British Overseas Territory') as a "Colony of the British Crown" in draft legislation about visa-less travel to the EU in a no-deal scenario.

=== National security ===
Exiting the EU is expected to cause serious disruption to security relationships built up with the UK and may compromise British national security. The difficulties would have increased significantly in the event of a "no-deal" exit.

=== Military operations ===
British troops in Bosnia as part of an EU force would have needed to be placed under NATO command.

In February 2019, The Times reported plans to evacuate the Royal Family from London in the event of rioting following a no-deal Brexit, however neither Buckingham Palace nor 10 Downing Street would comment on the report.

=== Tariffs ===
On 13 March 2019, the Department for International Trade released details of temporary tariff rates that would apply to imports if the United Kingdom left the EU without a deal. This tariff regime would have lasted for 12 months, then would have been reviewed. The new regime increased the percentage of items that were tariff free from 80% to 87%; products that would have become tariff-free included jams, jellies and marmalade (currently 24%), oranges (currently 16%), onions (currently 9.6%), peas (currently 8%), and televisions (currently 14%). However, there seemed to be no reason to expect these tariffs to be reciprocated and some exporters foresaw a complete loss of their major markets.

On 22 July 2019, the Trade Secretary Liam Fox said that these were short-term transitory rates and should be expected to change.

=== Risks common to all areas ===
==== Legal ====
In the event of a "no-deal" exit existing legislation would have been used as far as possible to cover any essential contingency measures but a power of last resort was to use the Civil Contingencies Act 2004 to introduce temporary legislation. British government departments said existing legislation was sufficient.

==== Communications ====
The British Government withdrew communication resources with regard to a no-deal exit on 23 March 2019 due to it being out of date.

The EU announced that British residents and undertakings would have been unable to register or renew .eu domain names after the withdrawal date.

==== Data ====
The British Government issued a notice about how data protection law would have worked if the UK had left the EU without a deal.

=== GATT 24 ===
It had been suggested by supporters of Brexit – including Boris Johnson – that, in the event of a no-deal scenario, paragraph 5b Article 24 of the General Agreement on Tariffs and Trade might be used to avoid the need (under WTO rules) for the EU and UK to apply tariffs to their mutual trade. This position was criticised as unrealistic by Mark Carney, Liam Fox and others, as paragraph 5c requires an agreement with the EU be in place for paragraph 5b to be of use, and would not cover services.

== EU preparedness ==
The European Union issued a press release on 25 March 2019 saying that it had prepared for an increasingly likely "no-deal" scenario on 12 April 2019. It issued 90 preparedness notices, 3 Commission Communications, 19 legislative proposals, and a number of fact sheets for its citizens.

For example, this included a nine-month temporary measure to allow the negotiation of a long term solution for the rail link between the UK and the continent.

Different laws/waivers, including some under work, were considered, for instance:

- to temporarily allow British citizens to travel without visa within the EU, if the UK had a reciprocal arrangement,
- to allow Erasmus students to finish their year/semester,
- to pay British beneficiaries if the UK complied with its obligations,
- to pay fishers for the temporarily inactivity generated by Brexit, unless the EU shared its fish resources with the UK and the UK with the EU

=== Recasting of EU institutions ===
The immediate effects of withdrawal (had it been with or without a ratified treaty) were ending of the UK's membership of the Council of the European Union and the European Commission, and the loss of the 73 seats of British representatives in the European Parliament who were elected in the May 2019 European Parliament election in the United Kingdom. The latter required re-apportionment of some of those seats among the remaining member states according to the result of the 2019 elections which took into account Brexit as planned.

=== Transport ===
Transport between the UK and the EU would have suffered from long delays, which the parties made efforts to ameliorate:

- British airlines would have been able to operate flights between the UK and the EU until March 2020;
- Eurostar, and shuttle would have been allowed to operate for three months
- The status of the roads that cross the border between Northern Ireland and the Republic of Ireland remained unclear. Both sides vowed not to reintroduce border controls as required by WTO terms. (For details, see Brexit and the Irish border).

=== Galileo ===
Removal of Galileo satellite navigation infrastructure from the United Kingdom, Falklands and Ascension Islands is in the final stages of completion.

== Member states preparedness ==
=== Austria ===
In case of a no-deal Brexit, Austria would have offered British nationals living in Austria a free six months delay to apply for a €160 residence permit with simplified rules which would not require speaking German to obtain residency.

=== Belgium ===
Belgium drafted, in case of a no-deal Brexit, a bilingual Dutch-French law offering a transition period until December 2020. This time offered the possibility for British citizens to apply for a €57 long-term residence permit, called a D-card, but specific to Brexit.

=== Bulgaria ===
Bulgaria would have offered British residents the same rights as EU citizens, but required them to re-register.

=== Croatia ===
Croatia would have offered to British nationals a free application for temporary residence upgradeable after no-deal Brexit to a HRK 79.50 resident ID card. Permanent residency is an option for people who have been there 5 years or more.

=== Cyprus ===
British authorities advised British nationals to register with the local authorities.

=== Czech Republic ===
Czechs had the most generous proposals with a draft law to offer 8,000 Britons living in the country a 21-month exemption from normal immigration laws, till the end of 2020. This offer relies on reciprocity for the 40,000 Czech citizens living in Britain.

=== France ===
France considered that a no deal Brexit (sortie sèche in French) would occur because a withdrawal agreement had not been ratified.

Accordingly, 200 measures were considered, including the possibility for the government to make and unmake laws by ordonnance (roughly equivalent to a statutory instrument).

The rights of British citizens living in France are ruled by an ordonnance dated 6 February 2019 and by décrets (decrees) dated 2 and 3 April 2019. This included a 12-month period, assuming reciprocity, to allow British nationals to continue to live in France without titre de séjour. After that, they must have had a carte de résident (10-year residence permit) if they had lived in France for more than five years, otherwise one of the titres.

Border controls would have been made possible through an ordonnance and a décret of 23 January 2019 and an ordonnance of 27 March 2019 to establish border checks.

An ordonnance of 30 January 2019 allowed the movement of defence goods between France and the United Kingdom to continue.

=== Germany ===
Germany would have offered British citizens three months to apply for residence permits. Germany also recruited 900 extra customs staff.

=== Greece ===
In July, Greece understood that "Boris Johnson's election as PM of the United Kingdom creates the conditions for a disorderly Brexit". For this reason, according to Varvitsiotis, Greece wanted to fix the "list of hundreds of pending issues that we must look at, because if they are not covered by an overall EU–UK agreement, all these agreements must be drawn up on a bilateral, national level." He wanted for all actions to respect both the "relations we have but also the relations that we will build from here on."

=== Republic of Ireland ===
The economies of both parts of Ireland were expected to be seriously affected by a no-deal Brexit. The EU planned to ensure that the economy of the Republic of Ireland was supported through the crisis with "a huge aid package" from the contingency fund. On 22 July 2019, an EU diplomat told The Times that the bloc would "spend whatever was necessary" to support the Irish government through any disruption of trade. According to the then British Brexit Secretary, Steve Barclay, 40% of the Republic's tangibles trade with continental Europe went via Dover/Calais, which (in a no-deal scenario) was expected to be seriously disrupted.

Eamonn O’Reilly, CEO of Dublin Port, was quoted on 21 March 2019 as indicating the port was "as ready as we can be" for a No-deal Brexit with 8 hectares (20 acres) allocated for the eventuality.

=== Poland ===
Poland planned a draft law to offer Britons living in Poland a delay from no deal Brexit at midnight on 29–30 March in 2019, until 30 March 2020, to protect their rights by obtaining a temporary residence permit or permanent residence in Poland. Theresa May said: "Almost 1 million Poles make their lives in Britain. That is why securing the rights of Polish and other EU citizens was my priority in the Brexit negotiations.".

The card would have been different from a normal residency permit, being a "Brexit" card.

=== Spain ===
Spain established a 42-page document of English-language royal decrees containing several chapters:

1. "General Provisions": the purpose of the Royal Decree-Law, mechanism of reciprocity, temporary nature, possible extension
2. "Citizens" sets forth the provisions affecting citizens that would require urgent adoption
3. "International Police and Judicial Cooperation" regulates international police and judicial cooperation, including some laws and instruments which cease to apply
4. "Economic Activities" with 4 sub-parts
5. "Transport" includes provisions on land transport

=== Sweden ===
The Swedish government adopted certain transitional rules to facilitate British citizens in Sweden in the event of withdrawal without deal or if an agreement is approved too late to be legislated. Most were valid for one year.

- British citizens and their family members would not need a residence and work permit, they were exempted from fees for studying at universities and colleges in Sweden they were enrolled in at Brexit, and children without a residence permit could have continued to attend Swedish schools.
- British driving licenses were valid for residents of Sweden for one year from Brexit, but a simple exchange to a Swedish driver's license was not included, so people should do that before Brexit.
- Swedish citizens in the UK could receive pensions, health care costs and other social security benefits from Sweden during 2019.

== EEA EFTA preparedness ==
Members of the European Union (blue) and European Free Trade Association (EFTA) (green)

Because the "EEA EFTA-UK separation agreement" would only apply if the Withdrawal Agreement was concluded between the EU and the UK, a no-deal agreement was also agreed:

According to the gov.uk, "EEA EFTA no deal citizens'rights agreement" was the citizens' rights agreement with the EEA EFTA states to protect the rights of British and EEA EFTA nationals who had chosen to call each others' countries home. This would have come into effect in a no deal scenario.

The official name of this agreement was "Agreement on arrangements regarding citizens’ rights between Iceland, the Principality of Liechtenstein, the Kingdom of Norway and the United Kingdom of Great Britain and Northern Ireland following the withdrawal of the United Kingdom from the European Union and the EEA Agreement".

== Other countries' positions on no-deal Brexit ==
=== United States ===
A no-deal Brexit was strongly supported by the Trump Administration. U.S. national security adviser John R. Bolton told British Prime Minister Boris Johnson that President Trump wanted to see a successful British exit from the European Union. A no-deal Brexit might also have offered a possible switch of British alignment to US rules rather than EU rules.

However, Speaker of the House of Representatives Nancy Pelosi (leader of the Democratic Congressional majority) said that the House will refuse to ratify any US/UK free trade agreement if the stability of the Good Friday Agreement was imperilled.

Alexandra Hall Hall, the Brexit Counsellor at the British Embassy in Washington, D.C., resigned because she felt she was asked to "peddle half-truths on behalf of a government I do not trust". Hall Hall stated, "I have been increasingly dismayed by the way in which our political leaders have tried to deliver Brexit, with reluctance to address honestly, even with our own citizens, the challenges and trade-offs which Brexit involves; the use of misleading or disingenuous arguments about the implications of the various options before us; and some behaviour towards our institutions, which, were it happening in another country, we would almost certainly as diplomats have received instructions to register our concern."

== Subsequent EU/UK free trade agreement negotiations ==
It is generally assumed that the UK and EU would have wished to negotiate a free-trade agreement. Dominic Raab, the British Foreign Secretary and First Secretary of State, believed that the UK would be better able to negotiate an FTA with the EU after a no-deal Brexit. However the Institute for Government disagreed, pointing out that negotiations in that case would not be under Article 50 terms but under the EU's "third countries" arrangements which "take place on a different legal basis with a more complicated process and ratification requirements – which is likely to involve ratification in all 27 member state parliaments".

== See also ==
- Church House Declaration
