= Basner =

Basner may refer to:

- 4267 Basner, an asteroid
- Veniamin Basner a Russian composer
- Bazna (pig) or Basner, a breed of pig
