= Mangalica =

Breed of pig

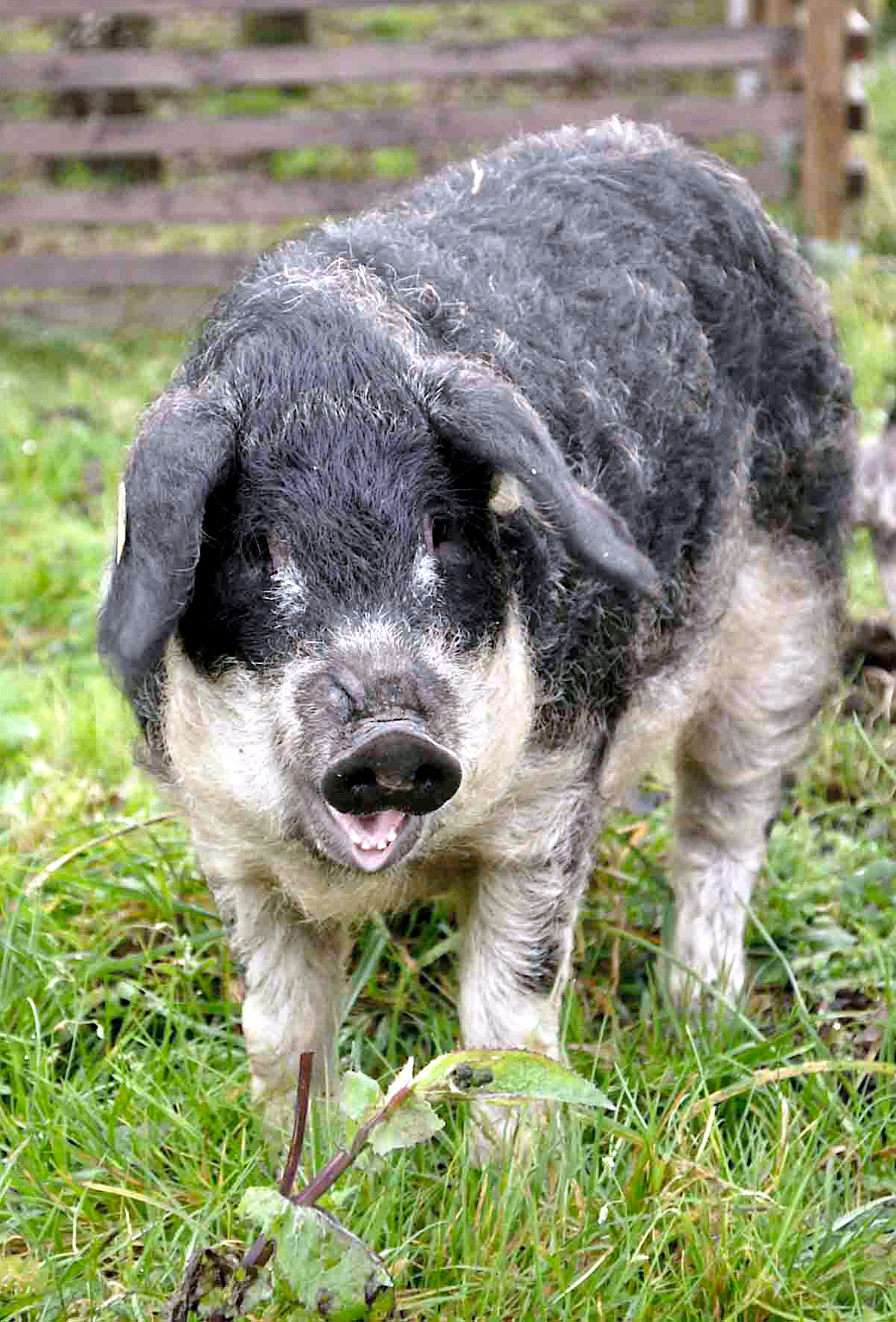
- Other names: Mangalitza; Mangalitsa
- Country of origin: Hungary

Traits
- Weight: at 13–14 months: 180–200 kg; after fattening: 200–300 kg; maximum: over 500 kg
- Hair: Blonde Mangalica - blonde; Swallow-bellied Mangalica - black and blonde; Red Mangalica - reddish-brown

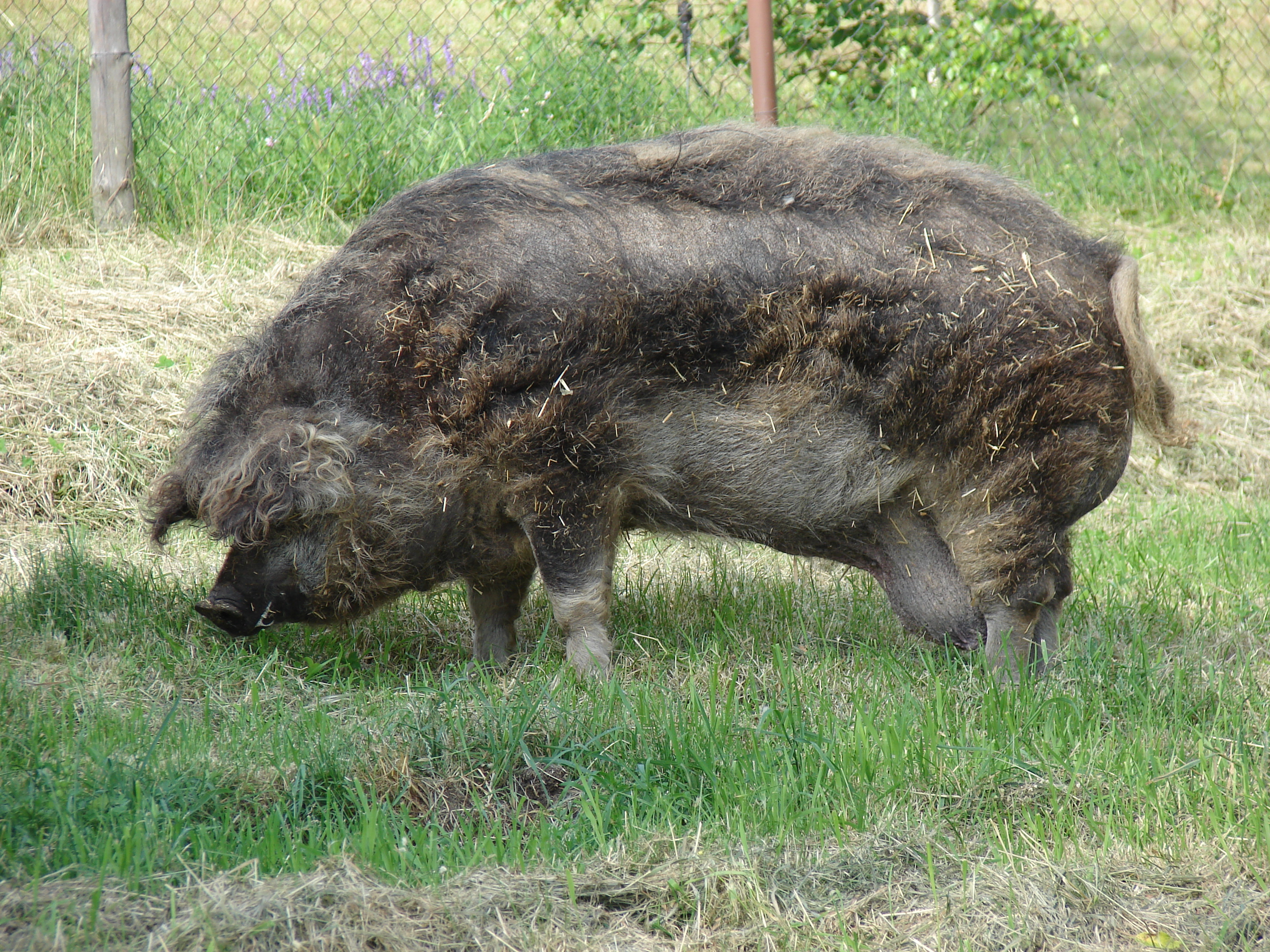
A swallow-bellied Mangalica in the gardens of the Franciscan monastery at Kadaň, Czech Republic

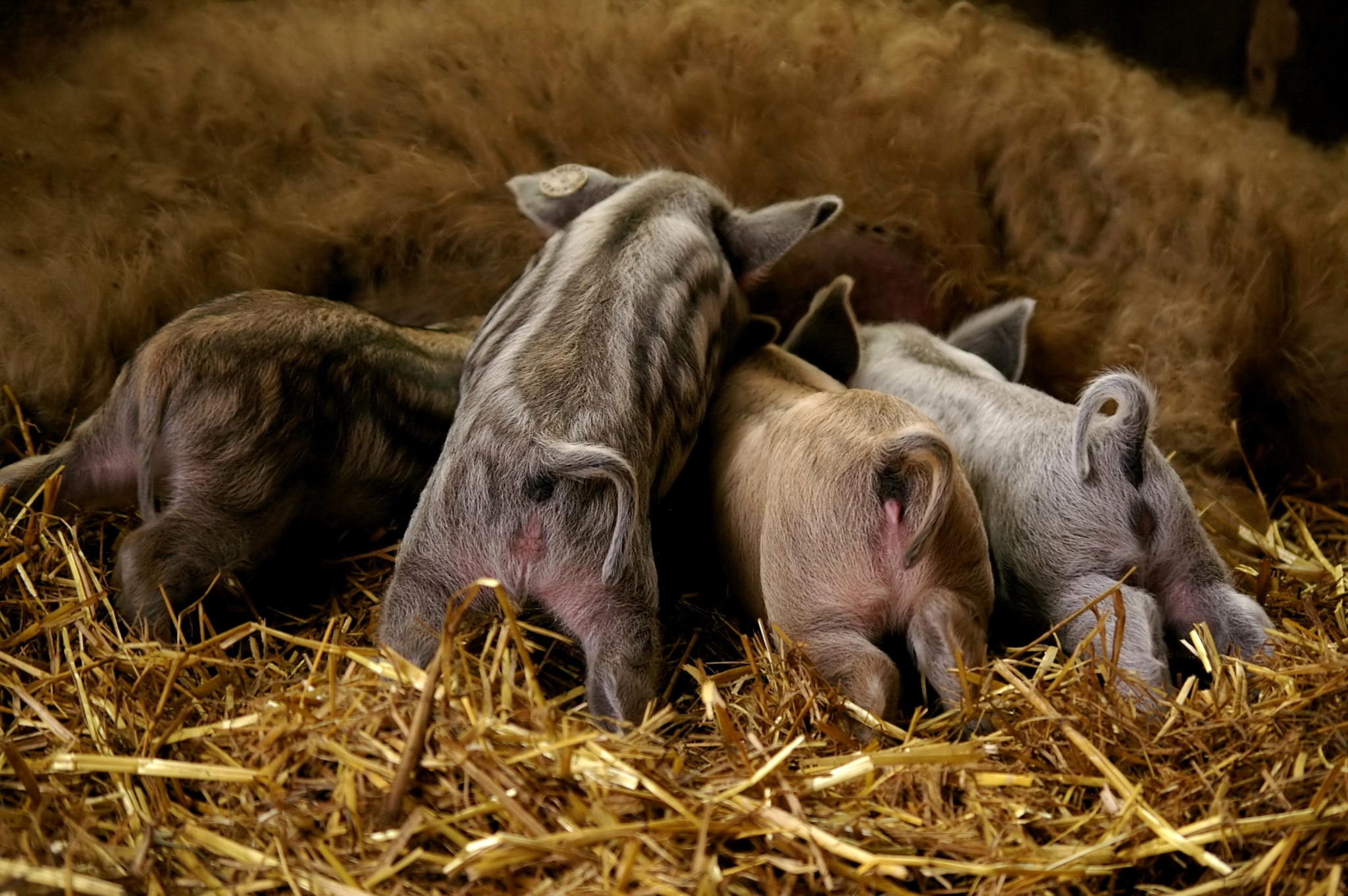
Mangalica piglets, about one month old, in Münsterland, Germany

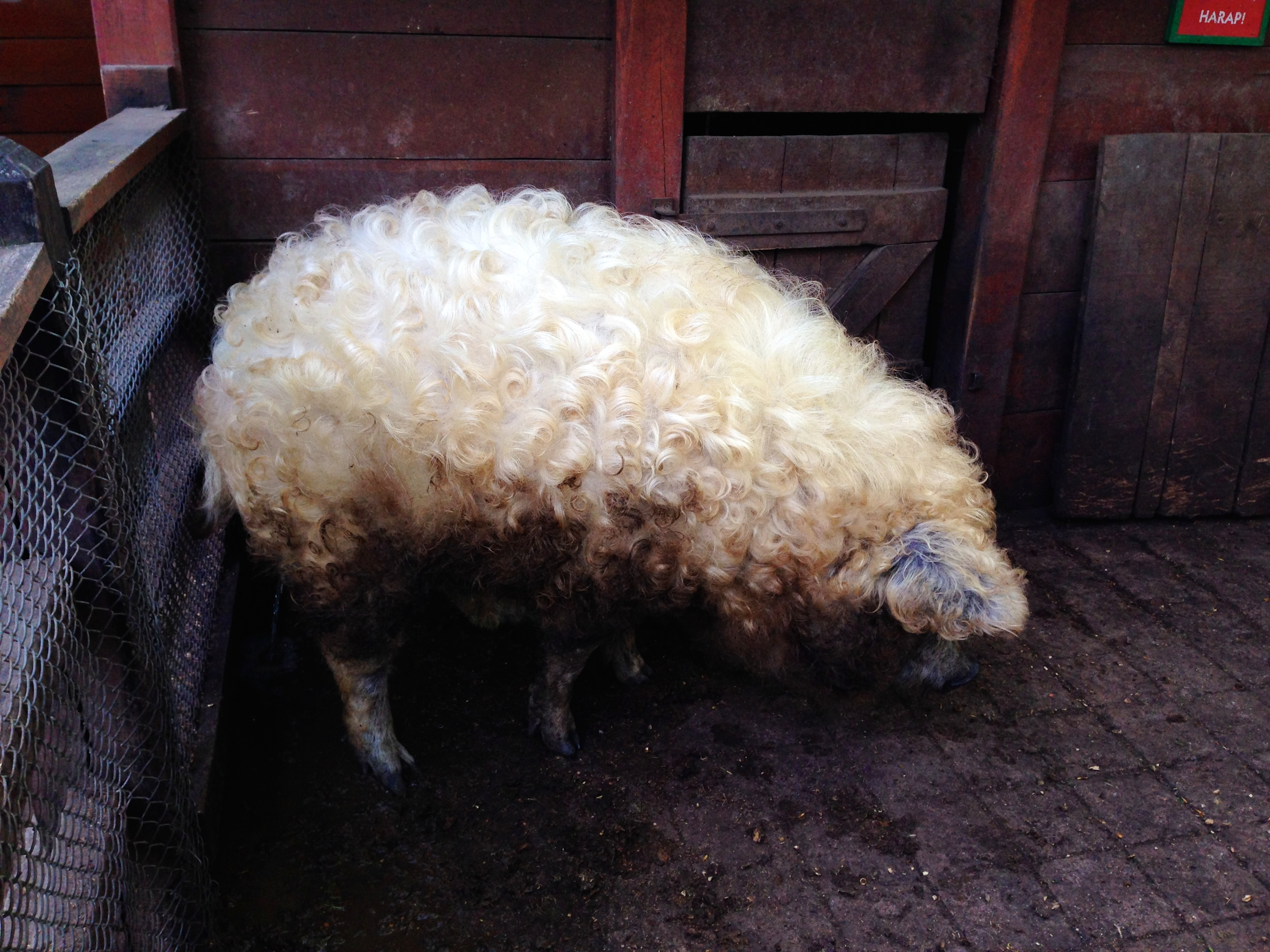
The curly blonde coat of a Mangalica pig at Budapest Zoo, Hungary

The Mangalica (Hungarian pronunciation: [ˈmɒŋɡɒlit͡sɒ], also Mangalitsa or Mangalitza) is a Hungarian breed of domestic pig. It was developed in the mid-19th century by crossbreeding breeds from Hungarian Nagyszalonta (now Salonta, Romania) and Hungarian Bakony with the European wild boar and the Serbian Šumadija breed. The Mangalica pig grows a thick, curly coat of hair. The only other pig breed noted for having a long coat is the extinct Lincolnshire Curly Coat pig of England.

== History ==
The name Mangalica derives from Serbo-Croatian, meaning approximately "roll-shaped" and suggesting the animals are well fed. The blonde Mangalica variety was developed from older, hardy types of Hungarian pig (Bakonyi and Szalontai) crossed with the European wild boar and a Serbian breed (and later others like Alföldi) in Austria-Hungary (1833). That year, Prince of Serbia Miloš Obrenović sent 12 pigs of the autochthonous Serbian Šumadinka breed, ten sows and two boars. Pigs originally grown at the prince's Topčider farm near Belgrade were used to create the Syrmian Black Lasa breed, also known as the Black Mangalica. The prince sent the animals to the Archduke Joseph, Palatine of Hungary, on whose estate the new breed was to be created.

The new, quick-growing, "fat-type" hog did not require any special care, which caused it to become very popular in Hungary. In 1927, the National Society of Fat-Type Hog Breeders (Mangalicatenyésztők Országos Egyesülete) was established, with the objective of improving the breed. Mangalica was the most prominent swine breed in the region until 1950 (30,000 of them were in Hungary in 1943). Since then, the popularity, as well as the population, of Mangalica has been decreasing, with the rising availability of pork from farther away and refrigeration. In 1991, fewer than 200 Mangalica remained in Hungary. Monte Nevado, a Spanish company, began the breeding and recovery of Mangalica, and the company was awarded with the Middle Cross of Hungary in 2016. Nowadays, the keeping of Mangalica hogs has become a popular hobby. Slightly over 7,000 Mangalica sows in Hungary are producing around 60,000 piglets a year.

Apart from Hungary, the Mangalica is present in Austria, Canada, Croatia, the Czech Republic, France, Germany, the Netherlands, Romania, Serbia, Slovakia, Slovenia, Switzerland, and the United States. In Serbia, the breed (which is called mangulica in Serbian) almost completely died out in the 1980s. In 1998, Mangalica were introduced into the Zasavica wetlands. They are left to roam free in a reservation, becoming partially feral, with cases of breeding with wild boars known. By the early 2010s, their number had grown to 1,000 in Zasavica and in populations kept in the individual farms in the Syrmia and Mačva regions. As both autochthonous Serbian breeds of domestic pig, Šiška and Mangalica's predecessor Šumadinka, have died out, Mangalica swine are considered the only surviving autochthonous breed in Serbia. In March 2006, seventeen of the pigs were exported from Austria to the United Kingdom, where they are registered with the British Pig Association, and a Mangalica population is part of an environmental project in Dorset, England. In 2007, some were exported to the United States.

The Romanian Native or Bazna breed was created in 1872 by cross-breeding Mangalitsa and Berkshire stock.

== Husbandry ==
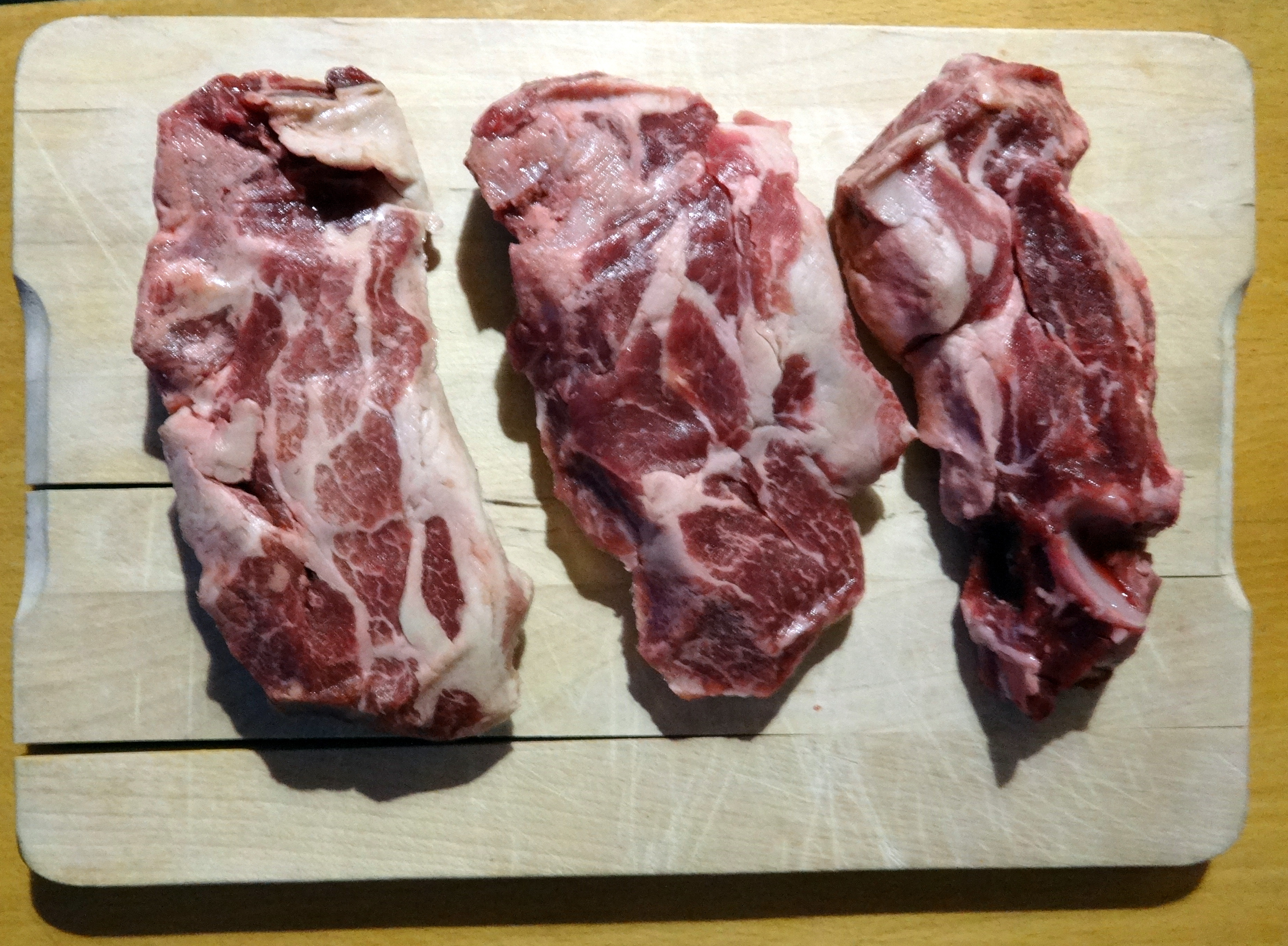
Mangalica meat

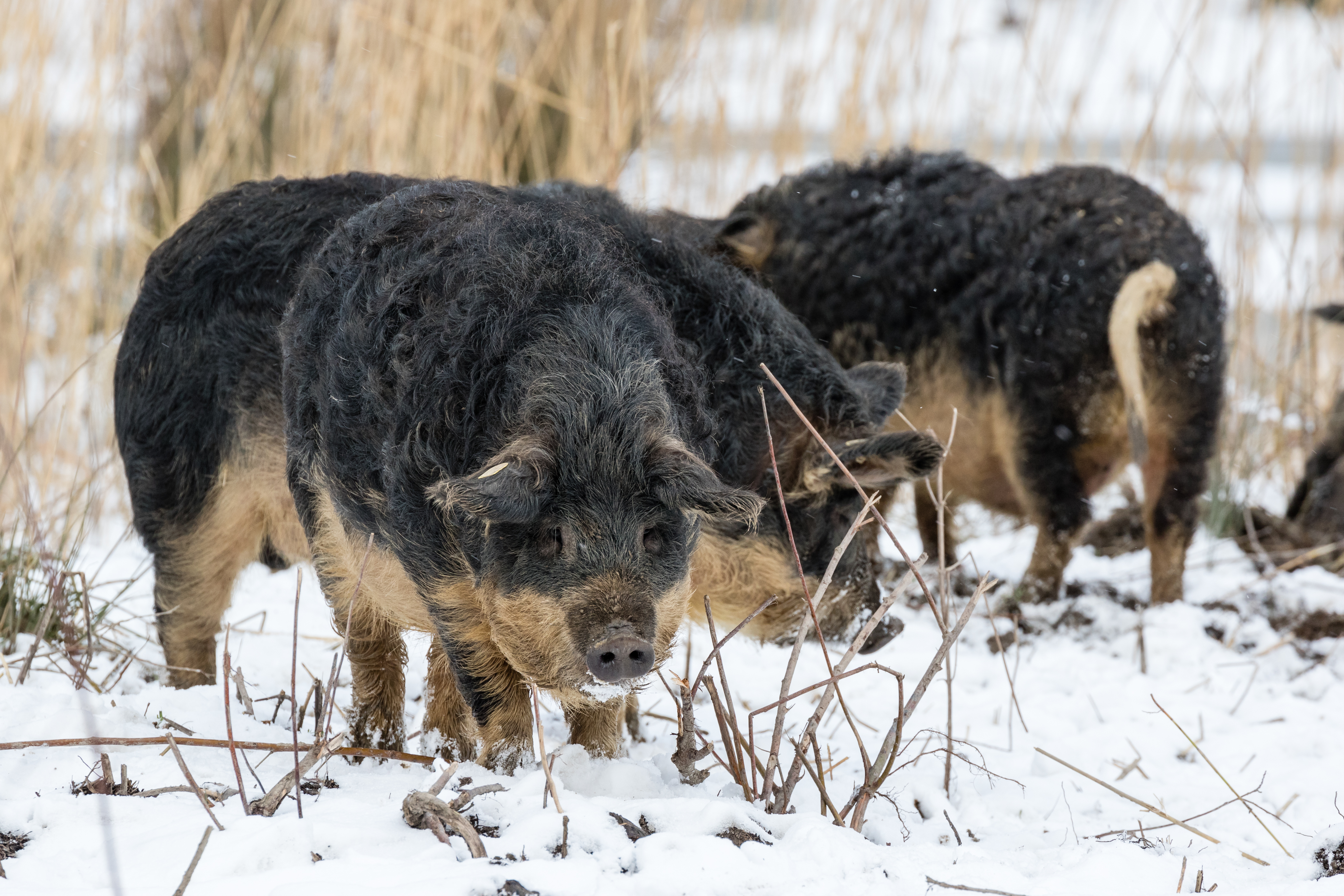
Mangalica, well prepared for winter

The Mangalica produces too little lean meat, so it has been gradually replaced by modern domestic breeds. It is usually fed with a mix of wild pasture, supplemented with potatoes and pumpkins produced on the farm.

The primary product made from this pig is sausage, usually packed in the pig's duodenum. The minced meat is seasoned with salt, pepper, sweet paprika, and other spices. It is then eaten in slices with pickled vegetables. The pork is also served braised with sauerkraut, potatoes, and stuffed peppers as a side dish. Farmers also produce smoked hams. The fresh meat tastes strong and juicy; the suckling pigs are much preferred for their good fresh meat qualities.

Slaughter weight (for meat production) is generally achieved beyond 12 months of age.

Meat from the Mangalica can be easily found in Hungary, as Hungarian farmers produce about 60,000 animals each year.

== Varieties ==
The three existing varieties of Mangalitsa differ only in colour—"blonde", "swallow-bellied", and "red". The "blonde" Mangalica is blonde, the "swallow-bellied" (originally produced by crossing the Blonde Mangalica with the extinct Black Mangalica) has a blonde lower-portion of its body, while the upper-portion of its body is black, and the "red" (produced by crossing the Blonde Mangalica with the Szalonta breed) is ginger-coloured. Other varieties (including "black", "wolf", and "baris") have become extinct as pure-bred forms, though their reconstruction from selective breeding of mixed varieties is being debated in Hungary.

== See also ==
- Boar–pig hybrid
