= RLR =

RLR may refer to:

- Rahal Letterman Racing, an American auto racing team
- Range Life Records, an American record label
- Regular local ring
- Richard Lloyd Racing, a defunct British auto racing team
- RIG-I-like receptor, a family of intracellular receptors
- Royal Longford Rifles, auxiliary unit of the British Army
- Ruislip Lido Railway, a miniature railway in England
- Rural Land Register, a British database of land ownership
- Retron Library Recombineering, a genetic technique that uses retrons
