= Sir Arthur Lewis Building =

Building now used by the London School of Economics; formerly HM Land Registry

Coordinates: 51°30′56″N 0°06′53″W

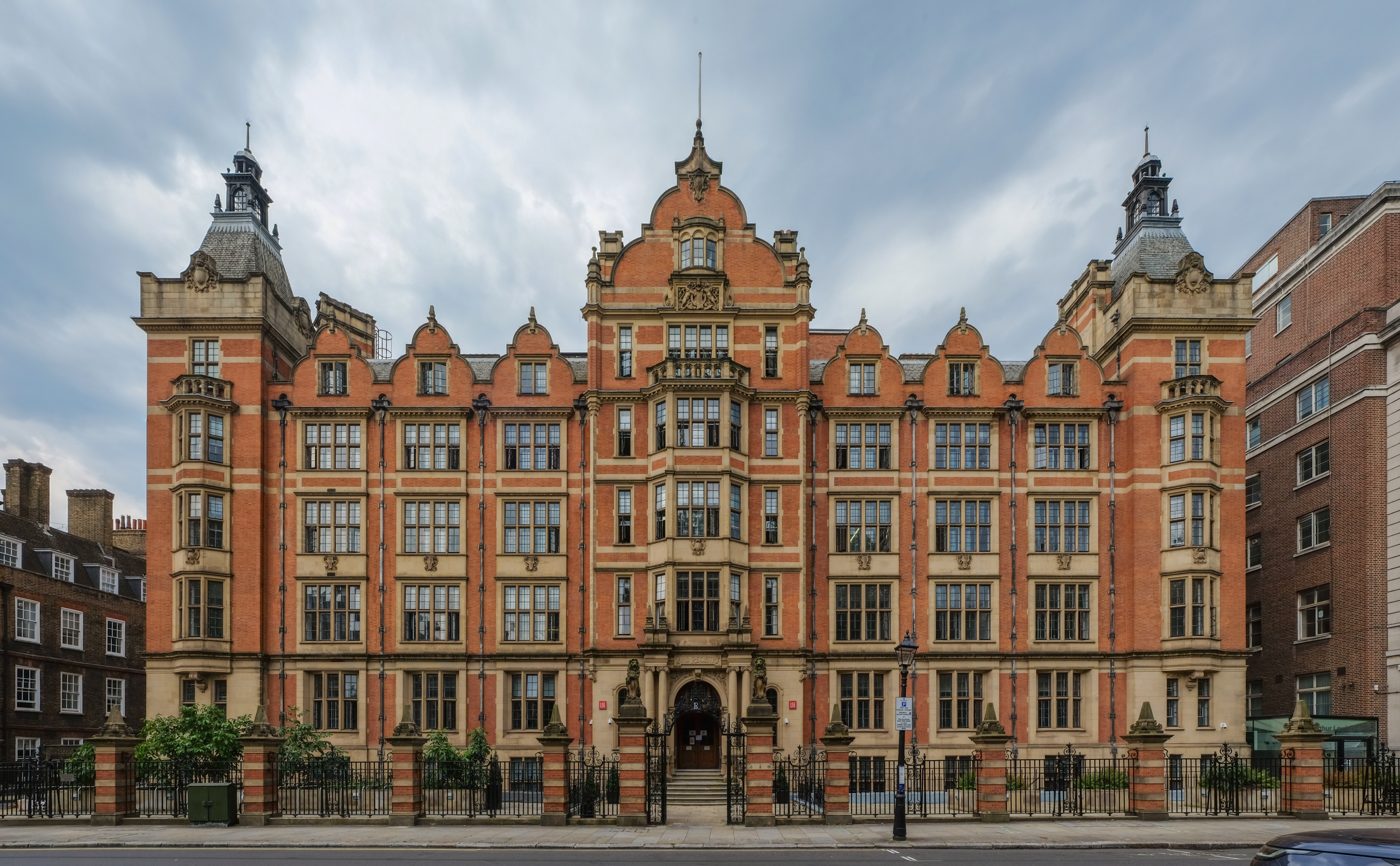
Sir Arthur Lewis Building in Lincoln's Inn Fields

Sir Arthur Lewis Building (formerly 32 Lincoln's Inn Fields and Her Majesty's Land Registry Building) is an Edwardian Grade II listed building on the National Heritage List for England, and an academic facility of the London School of Economics and Political Science (LSE), located on the south side of Lincoln's Inn Fields in Central London.

The building was built in two stages between 1903 and 1913 to house the Head Office of HM Land Registry, with the west wing and centre of the building were built between 1903 and 1905, and the east wing was completed in 1912–1913. The Land Registrar Charles Brickdale based the design of the building on Blickling Hall in Norfolk. The designs were executed by the Office of Works under Henry Tanner and the supervising architect was Richard Allison.

The London School of Economics acquired the building in 2010 and converted it into an academic facility, through a £56 million investment. The interior was transformed by the architectural firm Jestico + Whites to include classrooms, two Harvard style lecture theatres, a cafeteria, break out spaces, and a new accessible entrance. The building was opened again in January 2013, and now houses its Department of Economics, the Centre for Economic Performance and the International Growth Centre.

In March 2023, the building was renamed the Sir Arthur Lewis Building to commemorate W. Arthur Lewis, the LSE's first black academic.

The building was the exterior set for the Halcyon Hotel in the 2017 World War II television drama The Halcyon.
