= Mid-term Review Reforms =

The Mid-term Review Reforms are a set of reforms of the EU’s Common Agricultural Policy adopted by the EU Council of Ministers on June 26, 2003. In summary, the main elements of the reformed CAP include: a single farm payment for EU farmers independent (decoupled) from production (although limited coupling may be permitted in some circumstances); compliance with environmental, food safety, animal and plant health, and animal welfare standards in order to receive the single payment; increased funding for rural development and accompanying environmental or animal welfare measures; a reduction in direct payments (modulation) for larger farms to finance the expanded rural development program; an agreement to limit the CAP (including rural development) budget at the 2007 level through 2013; and some additional market price support cuts.
