= National Pig Association =

Trade organisation in the United Kingdom

- Abbreviation: NPA
- Formation: October 1999
- Type: Trade association
- Legal status: Non-profit company (No. 3859242)
- Purpose: Pig farming in the UK
- Headquarters: Agriculture House
- Location: Stoneleigh Park, Warwickshire, CV8 2TZ
- Region served: UK
- Members: British pig farmers
- General Manager: Dr. Zoë Davies
- Main organ: NPA Chairman - Richard Longthorp
- Affiliations: NFU;Agriculture and Horticulture Development Board (BPEX - British Pig Executive)
- Staff: 3
- Website: NPA

The National Pig Association is the trade association for the pig industry in the UK.

== History ==
It was formed in October 1999 from the British Pig Association commercial committee and the NFU pig committee.

=== British pig industry ===
The British pig industry has faced economic hardship. In 2007 the NPA calculated that British farmers lose £26 for every pig they produce, when there was a large increase in the cost of animal feed. This led to the BPA contributing to a campaign song entitled Stand By Your Ham, a remake of the country music song Stand by Your Man, under the banner of Pigs are worth it. This was at a time when there was estimated to be 1,500 pig farmers in the UK who received around £1.10 per kilogram of pork.

In 2011, the NPA calculated that on average British pig farmers were losing £21 per pig they produce. In total British pig farmers are losing £4 million per week, with processors of pig meat making £8 million a week, and pig meat retailers making £16 million a week.

== Structure ==
It is based in Stoneleigh Park, the site of the NFU. Its members represent 70% of the British pig industry.

== Function ==
NPA is the representative trade association for the British pig industry. It works closely with the industry's monthly trade journal Pig World

== See also ==
- British Pig Association - maintains a register of the pig breeds in the UK
