= District registry =

District registry can refer to:

- a part of the High Court of Justice situated in various districts of England and Wales dealing with High Court family and civil business
- an office of HM Land Registry
- a register office
