= Rural Payments Agency =

Executive agency in the United Kingdom

Executive agency overview
- Formed: 2001
- Preceding Executive agency: Intervention Board for Agricultural Produce
- Headquarters: Reading, England
- Employees: 2300
- Minister responsible: Angela Eagle, Minister of State for Food Security and Rural Affairs
- Executive agency executive: Oliver Munn, CEO
- Parent department: Department for Environment, Food and Rural Affairs
- Website: gov.uk/rpa

The Rural Payments Agency (RPA) is an executive agency of the UK Department for Environment, Food and Rural Affairs (Defra). The RPA pays out over £2 billion each year to support the UK farming and food sectors. The Agency manages more than 40 schemes, the largest of which the Basic Payment Scheme (BPS) paying more than £1.5 billion to around 105,000 claimants a year. Prior to Brexit, the RPA delivered the European Union (EU) Common Agricultural Policy (CAP) payments to farmers and traders in England.

Along with paying subsidies the agency has a number of other roles including managing the British Cattle Movement Service and the Rural Land Register which holds around 2.4 million registered land parcels digitally, and sends land maps to landowners in England.

RPA works closely with Natural England and the Forestry Commission which are responsible for authorising payments under the Rural Development Programme for England for schemes including Environmental Stewardship and the English Woodland Grant Scheme.

Part of the role of the agency is to issue holding numbers and vendor numbers to landowners in England who wish to take advantage of the various schemes Defra offers.

The RPA publishes an annual business plan which sets out its targets and commitments to its customers, Defra and the taxpayer.

== History ==
The RPA was created on 16 October 2001 from the amalgamation of the Intervention Board for Agricultural Produce and the Defra Paying Agency as a single paying agency for most Common Agricultural Policy schemes in England and certain schemes throughout the whole of the UK. Most notably the agency is responsible for administering and distributing the Basic Payment Scheme (previously the Single Payment Scheme) to farmers in England. It also enforces the European Union's regulations on the class, quality, size and shape of vegetables and fruit sold, by warning and advising businesses, and occasionally prosecuting under section 14 of the Agriculture and Horticulture Act 1964 (c. 28).

In 2003 the British Cattle Movement Service, which manages the Cattle Tracing System (CTS) for the whole of Great Britain, was amalgamated into the RPA. It maintains a register of births, deaths and movements of cattle to be used for animal health purposes; issues cattle passports; and records where individual cattle are, as well as operating a dedicated helpline. It handles around 20 million transactions per year, the majority recorded online.

=== Single Payment Scheme ===
The Rural Payments Agency experienced difficulties in implementing the EU's new Single Payment Scheme in 2005 and in effectively processing payments to farmers. A National Audit Office report published in October 2006, highlighted the key issues.

The House of Commons Environment, Food and Rural Affairs Committee published on 18 January 2006 a highly critical interim report into the agency's IT systems and activity.

On 15 March 2006 the Chief Executive Johnson McNeil was sacked when a deadline of 14 February for calculating Single Payment Scheme entitlements was missed.

Further, on 12 June 2006 the RPA confirmed that an internal inquiry was under way into "outrageous behaviour" in the agency office in Newcastle.

Following a series of senior management changes during the mid to late 2000s, Mark Grimshaw took over as Chief Executive in January 2011 and established a new Executive leadership team.

The agency published a new Five Year Plan in February 2012. For the 2011 Single Payment Scheme, RPA recorded its best ever performance, paying more than 95% of the 2011 fund to 96% of claimants by the first week of March 2012.

The agency further continued to improve its performance and in his speech to the Oxford Farming Conference on 3 January 2013, Environment Secretary Owen Paterson, announced RPA had paid out more than £1.4 billion to 97,000 farmers by the end of December 2012. It actually achieved its target for December 2012 on the first banking day of the month.

The Single Payment Scheme was replaced with the Basic Payment Scheme in 2015.

== Offices ==
RPA has six main offices which are all located in England. The head office is in Reading, and its other major offices are in Carlisle, Exeter, Newcastle upon Tyne, York and Workington.

== See also ==
- Agriculture in the United Kingdom
- Common Agricultural Policy
