= Rural Land Register =

The Rural Land Register (RLR) is a database of maps showing the ownership of all agricultural land in the England, along with woodland and marginal land on which grants or subsidies are to be claimed.

The database is used by the Rural Payments Agency to pay subsidies and grants under schemes including the Environmental Stewardship Scheme, Farm Woodland Scheme and the Single Payment Scheme.

In January 2003 the Government estimated that the costs of the scheme would be 5.5 million pounds. The system has suffered from delays and problems in registering land.

== See also ==
- Land registry
- HM Land Registry
