= Single Payment Scheme =

On 26 June 2003, EU farm ministers adopted a fundamental reform of the Common Agricultural Policy (CAP) and introduced a new Single Payment Scheme (SPS or Single Farm Payment) for direct subsidy payments to landowners.

The system of subsidy applies throughout the European Union according to rules agreed between the member states. However, exact details of implementation and grants vary from country to country within the outline rules. Transitional rules also apply for new member states which joined the EU in 2004 and more recently. States have a choice of whether to introduce the new scheme at once, or to phase it in over a period from 2005 to 2013. The UK Government decided to be one of the first countries in Europe to introduce the Single Payment Scheme and decided to start to phase it in from 2005. Introduction in the UK was strategically coordinated via Defra, with devolved responsibility to England, Wales, Scotland and Northern Ireland to independently implement the scheme.

The new scheme was intended to change the way the EU supported its farm sector by removing the link between subsidies and production of specific crops. This reform focused on consumers and taxpayers, while giving farmers the freedom to produce what the market wanted. Member States have the choice to maintain a limited link between subsidy and production to avoid abandonment of particular production. Current payments to farmers continue to reflect historic patterns of production for different crops in countries where the scheme has yet to be introduced, or as a proportion of the total payment where the scheme is being introduced over a period of years.

The Single Farm Payment is linked to meeting environmental, public, animal and plant health and animal welfare standards and the need to keep land in good agricultural and environmental condition.

== History ==
It was an intention of the scheme to 'decouple' grant payments from production. This was in response to criticism from other World Trade Organization (WTO) countries (mainly the US), that the EU was unfairly subsidising farmers and providing an unfair competitive advantage. Under the SPS the farmer is no longer paid different amounts according to the crop he or she produces, but a set amount per hectare of agricultural land maintained in cultivatable condition. The intention is that choice of crop is based purely on market driven forces and not on production based grants. Decoupling of payments has allowed them to be categorised under the so-called blue box for the purpose of WTO negotiations, ensuring the legality and compliance of international obligations.

To gain funds from the SPS the Farmer has to cross comply – that is, to farm in an environmentally friendly way, with careful use of pesticides and fertilisers. The farmer also had to set aside (not farm) 8% of their productive land annually, in addition two metres on the perimeter of each field must be left uncropped to become overgrown. However, the requirement for set aside was suspended for one year in Autumn 2007 following sharp increases in prices for certain crops, and in consideration of the aim to grow more crops for biofuel production.

Another stated goal at the outset was to simplify the existing process including applications. Eleven existing schemes were replaced by the SPS.

Implementation of the payments in England has been impaired by problems at the Rural Payments Agency. Payments under the scheme were intended to be made by around January 2006, but by December 2006 some 2% of claims still remained unsettled. Payments amounted to £1.5 billion distributed amongst 115,000 claimants, though most of the money went to relatively few of the claimants (according to the size of their holdings). Difficulties in implementation included double the number of expected claimants, as rules of the new scheme allowed many more people with relatively small areas of land to claim.

Applications are made annually by completion of the SP5 form, which requires claimants to declare all the land under their control, the land they wish to claim payment on and whether they are subject to Statutory Management Requirements (SMR) or Good Agricultural and Environmental Conditions (GAEC). In February 2008 RPA began accepting electronic applications via third party software. The first application was submitted 27 February 2008 through Single Payment Supervisor by Paul Holliday Software. Following the success of the project to accept electronic applications via third party software RPA took the next logical step and in March 2010 began allowing submissions directly through their own Whole Farm Approach website. There is speculation within the agricultural industry that paper forms will be withdrawn in an attempt to reduce costs.

The scheme replaced eleven previous subsidy schemes which were based on the production of crops and/or livestock e.g. dairy premium and arable area payments scheme. Initially the payments had a bias towards paying producers who historically received the highest subsidies. The payment bias works on a sliding scale with a move away from historic payments towards land based payments with payments in 2012 having no historic element.

Implementation of the Single Payment Scheme in Wales was the responsibility of the Welsh Assembly Government. Payments totaling £250m were paid to more than 98% of eligible farmers between 1 December 2005 and 30 June 2006, including £110m to about 75% of Welsh farmers on the first possible day, which made them amongst the first in Europe to receive the new payment.

== Scheme details ==
The Single Payment Scheme (SPS) rewards farmers for managing their land to minimum ("Cross Compliance") standards for crop production, animal welfare and the environment. Farmers can submit a claim annually by declaring (1) all of the agricultural parcels (crops) on their farm and (2) their payment entitlements for activation. The farmer's declaration of her payment entitlements for activation is the farmer's request for a 'Single Payment'.

The farmer is paid against her declared payment entitlements that are each matched against an eligible hectare of declared land ('activated for payment'). The 'Area Declared' for Single Payment is respective; meaning that it relates to the two factors of (1) declared agricultural parcels and (2) payment entitlements declared for activation.

By way of example:

A farmer holds 102.00 payment entitlements.

The farmer declares all of his agricultural parcels that total exactly 100.00 eligible hectares.

If the farmer declares 102.00 of his payment entitlements for activation, the 'Area Declared' for Single Payment would be 100.00 hectares (the lower of the eligible hectares declared and the payment entitlements declared for activation).

If the farmer declares 98.00 of his payment entitlements for activation, the 'Area Declared' for Single Payment would be 98.00 hectares (the lower of the eligible hectares declared and the payment entitlements declared for activation).

== Basic Payment Scheme ==
Political agreement on CAP reform was reached in 2013. In January 2015, the Single Payment Scheme was replaced by the Basic Payment Scheme (BPS).

== See also ==
- Single Farm Payment
- English Beef and Lamb Executive (EBLEX)
- Meat and Livestock Commission
