= Single Farm Payment =

EU farm subsidy

The Single Farm Payment is an agricultural subsidy paid to farmers in the EU.

== History ==
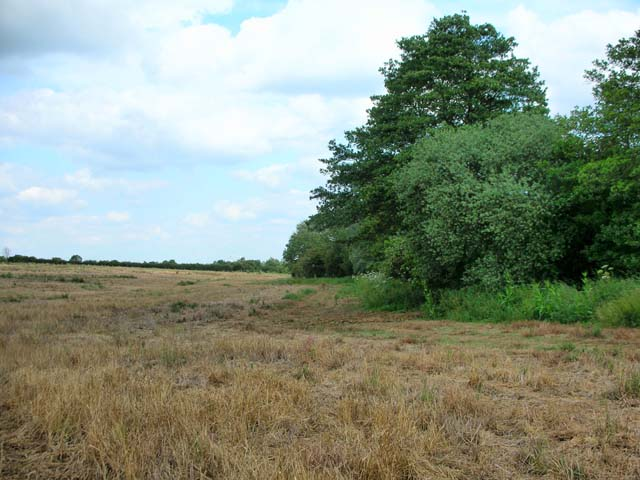
Farmland "set aside". Farmers can qualify for the Single Farm Payment by leaving areas fallow.

Historically, the EU's Common Agricultural Policy (CAP) emphasised direct subsidies for agricultural produce. To reduce price distortion, the connection between payments and specific crops was removed; instead, a "Single Farm Payment", which subsidised farmers on a per-hectare basis, was introduced in June 2003; although farmers may now attempt to claim subsidies for more land than they actually have. This "decoupling" of subsidies means they are accepted in the "Blue box" category of subsidies in the WTO Agreement on Agriculture negotiated at the Uruguay Round, in line with international agreements to reduce market-distorting subsidies and price controls.

== Payments to farmers ==
National governments within the EU make their own arrangements for implementation and for paying subsidies to farmers. When the UK was a part of the EU, this was done by the Rural Payments Agency, an executive agency of Defra. Some British farmers experienced problems due to delays in verifying how much land they have which is eligible for subsidy.

The Scottish government offered farmers an online system to claim subsidies, which reduces the burden of paperwork.

In non-Euro countries, payments to farmers may be made in local currency at an exchange rate set by the European Central Bank.

== Trading ==
Some farmers trade their subsidy entitlements.

== Economics ==
The Single Farm Payment is a large proportion of income for many farmers, who say they could not profit without subsidies. However, farm subsidies in developed countries push down food prices and impoverish third-world farmers. Taxpayers in the EU get more than most in return for their money.

In 2010, the EU spent €57 billion on agricultural development, of which €39 billion was spent on direct subsidies.

== See also ==
- Single Payment Scheme
- Intervention storage
- European Agricultural Guidance and Guarantee Fund
