= Livestock & Meat Commission for Northern Ireland =

Northern Irish government agency

Agency overview
- Formed: 1967
- Type: Executive non-departmental public body
- Jurisdiction: Northern Ireland
- Headquarters: Lissue Industrial Estate (East) 1A Lissue Walk, Lisburn
- Agency executives: Joe Stewart, Chair; Colin Smith, Chief Executive
- Website: www.lmcni.com

Livestock & Meat Commission for Northern Ireland (LMC) is an executive non-departmental public body of the Northern Ireland Executive. It promotes the red meat sector and markets the Protected Geographical Indication Comber New Potatoes, Armagh Bramley Apples, Lough Neagh Eels, Lough Neagh Pollan, Irish Cream, Irish Poteen, Irish Whiskey, Irish Grass-Fed Beef brands.

It was set up in 1967 to provide assurance to industry and consumers that animals produced for the food chain met certain standards.

== See also ==
- Agriculture and Horticulture Development Board
- Quality Meat Scotland
- Meat Promotion Wales
