= Meat Promotion Wales =

Government body in Aberystwyth, Wales

- Hybu Cig Cymru (Welsh)

Agency overview
- Formed: 2003
- Type: Welsh Government sponsored body
- Jurisdiction: Wales
- Headquarters: Tŷ Rheidol, Parc Merlin, Aberystwyth
- Agency executives: Catherine Smith, Chair; Heather Anstey-Myers, Chief Executive
- Website: meatpromotion.wales

Meat Promotion Wales (Welsh: Hybu Cig Cymru; HCC) is a Welsh Government sponsored body, which was established in 2003. It promotes the red meat sector and markets the Protected Geographical Indication Welsh Beef and Welsh Lamb brands.

== Controversies ==
In 2024, concerns surfaced about alleged bullying behaviour by a manager and an external investigation upheld several complaints against an individual working for HCC, leading the organisation to indicate that Mr Howells "will not be undertaking his duties for a period of time" due to "a period of sickness absence".

== See also ==
- Agriculture and Horticulture Development Board
- Quality Meat Scotland
- Livestock & Meat Commission for Northern Ireland
