= AHDB Potatoes =

Organisation to develop and promote the potato industry in Great Britain

- Formation: 1933/1955 as the Potato Marketing Board; 1997 as the British Potato Council
- Legal status: Division of a non-departmental public body
- Location: Stoneleigh Park, Kenilworth, Warwickshire, CV8 2TL
- Region served: Great Britain
- Members: 2,900 potato farmers and 400 potato distributors
- Director: Margaret Mogridge
- Parent organisation: Agriculture and Horticulture Development Board
- Budget: £6 million (from the levy)
- Website: potatoes.ahdb.org.uk

AHDB Potatoes, previously known as the Potato Council, is a trade organisation focusing on the promotion of the potato industry in Great Britain. Previously an independent non-departmental public body, it has been a division of the Agriculture and Horticulture Development Board since 1 April 2008.

AHDB Potatoes' grower levy is £42.62 per hectare, and the purchaser levy is £0.1858 per tonne. Its main base is at Stoneleigh Park in Warwickshire, and there is a Scottish office in Newbridge in Midlothian and an experimental station (SBEU) in Sutton Bridge in Lincolnshire.

Its publication is the Potato Weekly, which mainly lists current prices of potatoes per tonne. It visits agricultural shows.

== History ==
Set up to replace the Potato Marketing Board, the Potato Council was originally known as the Potato Industry Development Council and then the British Potato Council until April 2008.

=== Potato Marketing Board ===
The organisation was originally established in 1934 as the Potato Marketing Board by Potato Marketing Scheme 1993 approved under the Potato Marketing Scheme (Approval) Order (Great Britain) 1933 (SR&O 1933/1186), under powers given to potato producers under the Agricultural Marketing Act 1931 (21 & 22 Geo. 5. c. 42) and the Agricultural Marketing Act 1933 (23 & 24 Geo. 5. c. 31). The scheme was mainly set up to put an end to the unstable market conditions of the 1920s and 1930s. The board was to regulate the marketing of the industry by registering producers and prohibit sales by unregistered producers.

Upon the outbreak of the Second World War, the Ministry of Food took control of all agricultural production. With the passing of the Potato Marketing Scheme 1933 (Modification and Suspension) Order 1939 (SR&O 1939/1876) under the Defence (General) Regulations 1939 (SR&O 1939/927), all of the board's activities were suspended.

In 1955, the Potato Marketing Scheme (Approval) Order 1955 (SI 1955/690) repealed the previous order and created a new, similar entity. Amendments to the scheme were made by the Potato Marketing Scheme (Amendment) Order 1962 (SI 1962/883), Potato Marketing Scheme (Amendment) Order 1971 (SI 1971/711), Potato Marketing Scheme (Amendment) Order 1976 (SI 1976/133), Potato Marketing Scheme (Amendment) Order 1985 (SI 1985/312), Potato Marketing Scheme (Amendment) Order 1987 (SI 1987/212) and the Potato Marketing Scheme (Amendment) Order 1990 (SI 1990/1626). The board was largely producer-elected; however, it had a few ministerial appointees. Many of its powers were delegated to committees such as the Executive Committee and the Retailers' Committee. In 1958, the board bought the former RAF base, RAF Sutton Bridge in Lincolnshire, and set up an agricultural experiment station, now known as Sutton Bridge Crop Storage Research.

=== British Potato Council ===
In 1997, under the Potato Industry Development Council Order 1997 (SI 1997/266), the name was changed to the British Potato Council. It levied farmers under powers originally delegated from the Industrial Organisation and Development Act 1947 but now through powers granted to its parent organisation. It was also funded through the Scottish Executive Environment and Rural Affairs Department (SEERAD) and the National Assembly for Wales Agriculture Department (NAWAD).

In 2005, a report by Daniel Lewis from the Efficiency in Government Unit (jointly sponsored by the Centre for Policy Studies and the Economic Research Council), called The Essential Guide to British Quangos, looked into the role of quangos in British politics and potential efficiency savings that could have been made. The report named the British Potato Council as one of the nine "most useless quangos". In 2008, it was merged with other similar levy-funded organisations to form the Agriculture and Horticulture Development Board (AHDB), where it operates as a specialist division focused on the potato industry.

In 2007, the British Potato Council received £6 million in funding from British farmers. Despite this, the organization had to drop the word British from its name due to EU rules. This was to avoid the impression that it receives state subsidies.

== Agricultural experimental station ==
The agricultural experiment station is located alongside the River Nene between the Sutton Bridge Power Station and the A17 road. It occupies the former RAF Sutton Bridge airfield site that was acquired in 1958 by the Ministry of Agriculture.

== See also ==
- Warwick HRI
- Rothamsted Research
