= HM Land Registry =

Non-ministerial department of His Majesty's Government

- Welsh: Cofrestrfa Dir Ei Mawrhydi

Agency overview
- Formed: 1862
- Type: non-ministerial government department
- Jurisdiction: England and Wales
- Employees: 6,000+
- Agency executive: Iain Banfield, chief land registrar and chief executive
- Website: gov.uk/land-registry

His Majesty's Land Registry is a non-ministerial department of His Majesty's Government, created in 1862 to register the ownership of land and property in England and Wales. It reports to the Ministry of Housing, Communities and Local Government (MHCLG). The land register contains information on 87% (by area) of the freehold land in England and Wales as of 2019.

While HM Land Registry reports to MHCLG, it is operationally independent. The fees it charges for the registration and information services it provides are returned to HM Treasury. The current chief land registrar and chief executive is Iain Banfield.

The equivalent office in Scotland is the Registers of Scotland. Land and Property Services maintain records for Northern Ireland.

== Purpose ==
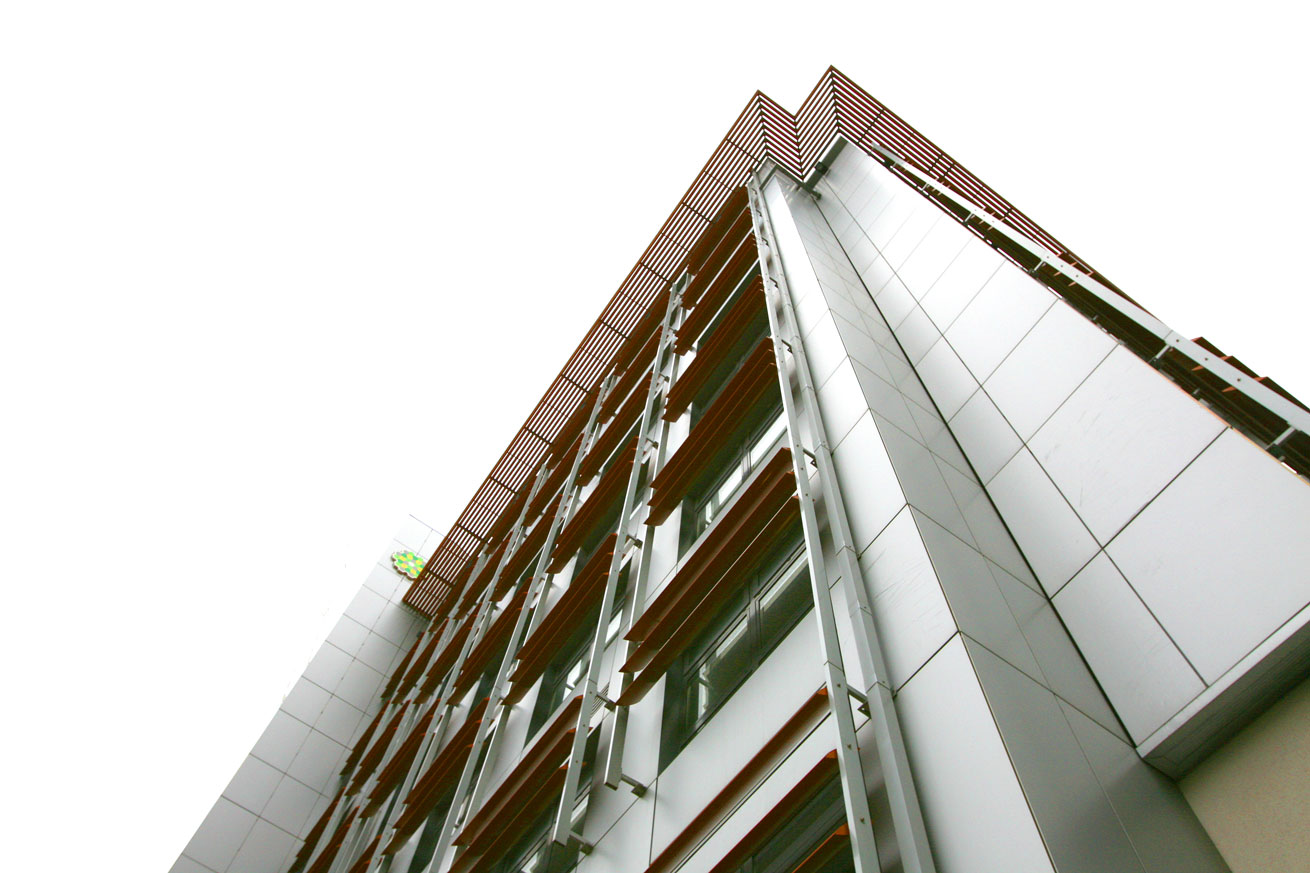
Trafalgar House, Bedford Park, Croydon, Greater London; HM Land Registry Head Office and Croydon Local Office

HM Land Registry registers the ownership of property, as well as noting other interests in registered land, in England and Wales, with this property valued at £9 trillion. The organisation receives 17,000 requests a day to change information on the register, maintains 13 datasets and manages 215,000 requests daily, about the information on the register.

Like land registration organisations in other countries, HM Land Registry guarantees title to registered estates and interests in land. It records the ownership rights of freehold properties, and leasehold properties where the lease has been granted for a term exceeding seven years.

Until April 2020, HM Land Registry operated as an executive agency of the UK Government and, as a trading fund, received no direct government funding, instead ensuring that its fee income covered all expenditure. In April 2020, HM Land Registry's trading fund status was revoked - since then it has received a budget from HM Treasury, like most other government departments. The funding that the Land Registry receives is offset by the fees charged under the Land Registration Fee Order 2021. It provides online access to its database of titles (ownership and charges or interests by other parties) and most plans (maps). Customers need to pay a fee to access some information.

Property owners whose property is not registered can make voluntary applications for registration. As of March 2024, there were more than 26.7 million registered titles representing 89% of the freehold land mass of England and Wales. Registration of land under the Land Registration Act 2002 affords property owners some protection against squatters.

== Advantages of land registration ==
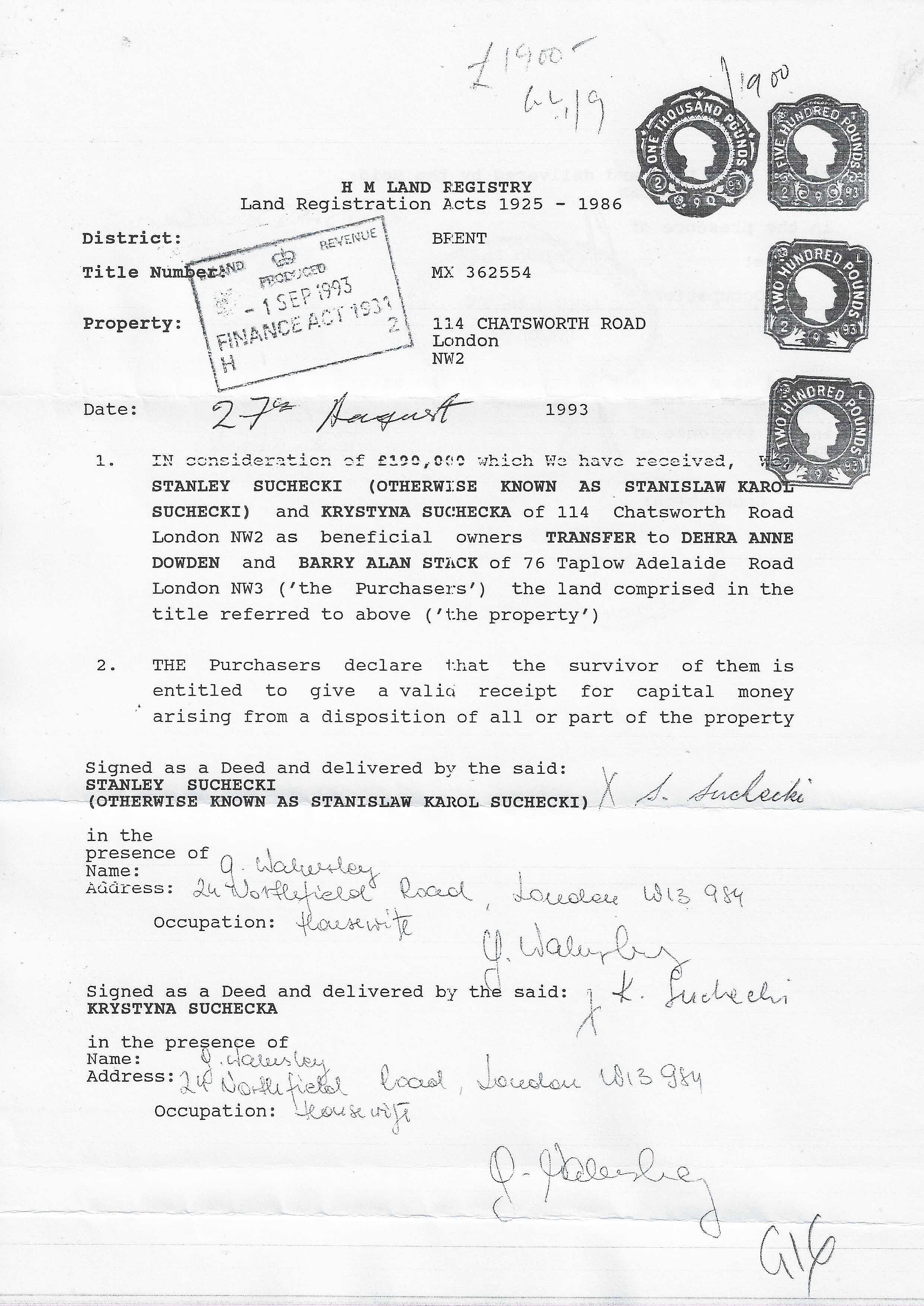
Document of HM Land Registry

Advantages of land registration include it making buying and selling property easier and it facilitating people being able to provide proof of ownership. According to the Deputy Director for Comprehensive Registration at HM Land Registry:

A comprehensive register will make conveyancing simpler, faster and cheaper as all the information necessary for conveyancing will be in the Land Register which is online and available to everyone to see. If land isn’t registered, the conveyancer has to get the deeds from the client or mortgage lender and examine them, all of which costs time and money.

When land is registered, a title plan is created to show the general extent of the land that is contained in the title on the Ordnance Survey map. The boundaries shown on a title plan are general and not definitive unless they are expressly noted in the register.

== Offices ==
HM Land Registry has 14 offices at: Birkenhead, Coventry, Croydon, Durham, Fylde (Warton), Gloucester, Kingston upon Hull, Leicester, Nottingham, Peterborough, Plymouth, Swansea, Telford and Weymouth. HM Land Registry's head office is located in Croydon. IT services are provided by the Plymouth office.

A review of staffing levels and office space began in 2009. The economic recession and reduced property sales meant that HM Land Registry's work was reduced to an extent where it made a financial loss. HM Land Registry announced proposals to close offices at Portsmouth, Tunbridge Wells, Croydon, Stevenage and Peterborough. As a result of the consultation the Croydon and Peterborough offices remained open, but the closure of the other offices went ahead, albeit with a small office remaining at Portsmouth until 2013 as a sub-office of the Croydon office.

The head office moved out of its Lincoln's Inn Fields building in March 2011. The building was purchased by the London School of Economics for a sum of £37.5 million.

== Structure ==
Traditionally, customers sent applications to the office that dealt with applications for the geographical area where the property was located, but the majority of applications are now typically processed at any Land Registry office, regardless of geographical location. From 6 January 2014, all paper applications lodged by members of the public have been processed at the Citizen Centre at Land Registry's Swansea Office.

The organisation is led by the Chief Land Registrar and Chief Executive (both one role). The Chief Land Registrar is assisted by the HM Land Registry Board. The HM Land Registry Board sets the overall strategy for the department. A number of senior committees are responsible for delivery of the annual business plan and are responsible for day-to-day management.

Since December 1990, the Land Register has been open to the public. For a fee, anyone can inspect the register, find out the name and address of the current owner of any registered property or obtain a copy of any registered title. This can also be done online.

HM Land Registry was awarded the former Charter Mark five times, and 97% of its customers rate their service as good, very good or excellent. Complaints about HM Land Registry can be submitted to the Independent Complaints Reviewer.

=== Tribunal ===
Disputed applications were determined by the Adjudicator to HM Land Registry, an independent office created by the Land Registration Act 2002. From July 2013, the functions of the Adjudicator have been transferred to the Land Registration division of the Property Chamber of the First-tier Tribunal.

== History ==
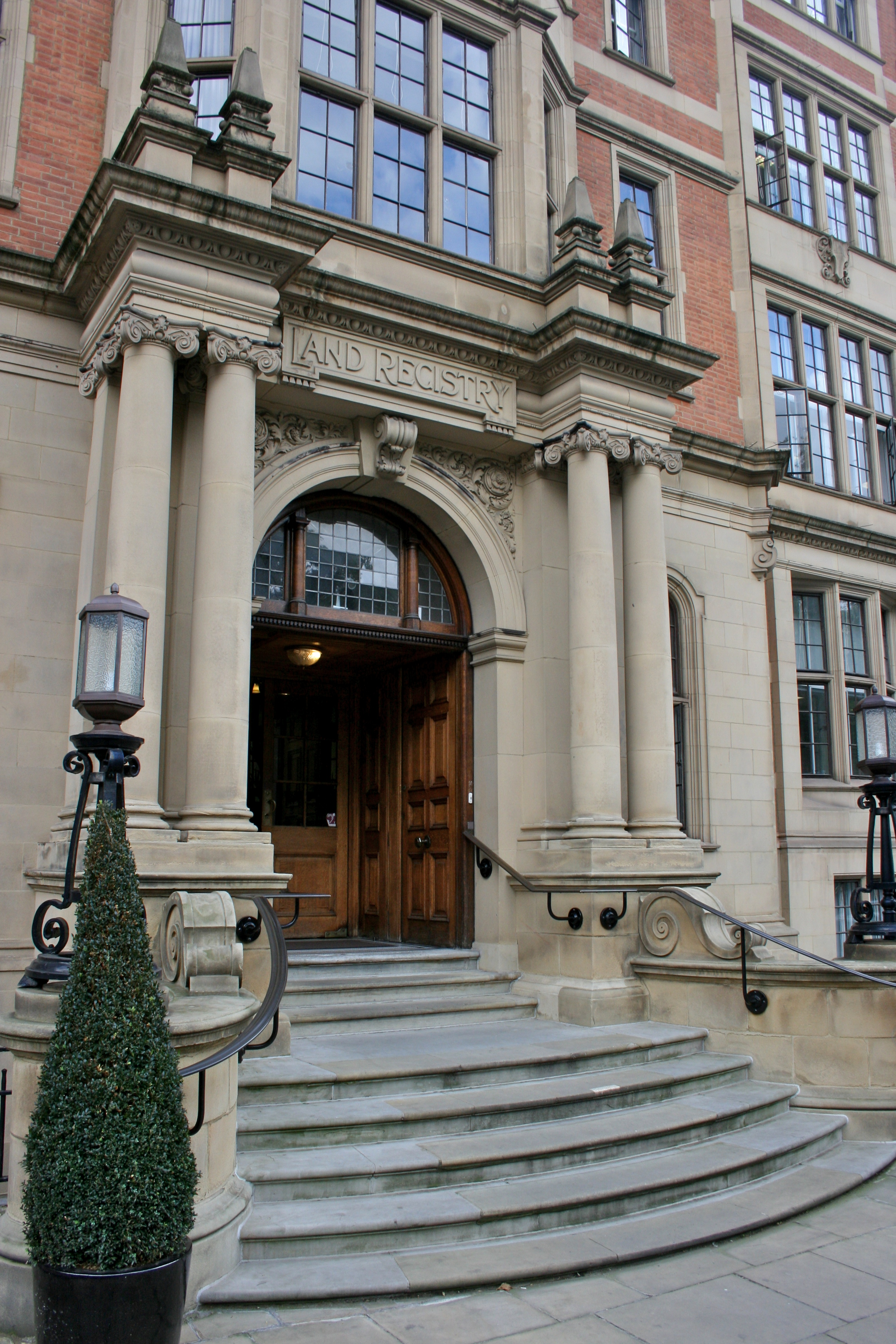
Former Land Registry Head Office, 32 Lincoln's Inn Fields (1913–2011)

In 1857 the Royal Commission on Registration of Title proposed a system of registration administered by a central registry in London with district offices. The Land Registry Act 1862 was introduced by the then Lord Chancellor, Richard Bethell, 1st Baron Westbury. The Act provided for the registration of freehold and long leasehold estates in land. The system of registration adopted differed somewhat from that piloted in South Australia by that colony's then Premier Sir Robert Torrens, although both were founded on the 1857 report.

Brent Spencer Follett, the first Chief Land Registrar, opened the Land Registry's first offices, at 34 Lincoln's Inn Fields, London, on 15 October 1862. Mr Follett had a staff of just six people and was paid £2,500 a year, at a time when the average labourer's wage was £40.

At first, registration was not compulsory, and once property was registered there was no compulsion to register any subsequent transactions. Thus it was possible for the person registered as the owner of a property to cease to be the owner while remaining on the register. Serious flaws in the 1862 Act led to the Land Transfer Act 1875, which forms the basis of the system used today. However, that Act did not make registration compulsory.

A report by Sir Charles Brickdale on the system of land registration used in Germany proved influential. In 1897 the then Lord Chancellor, Hardinge Giffard, 1st Earl of Halsbury, introduced the Land Transfer Act 1897, which brought an element of compulsion into the registration system, however it was still possible for local counties to veto compulsory registration, so registration was still limited, although it was adopted in London.

From 1905 to 1913 new HM Land Registry headquarters were built in Lincoln's Inn Fields.

Significant pieces of land legislation were enacted in 1925: the Law of Property Act and the Land Registration Act (LRA 1925). Government-initiated extensions to compulsory registration were suspended for ten years, but Eastbourne (1926) and Hastings (1929) voluntarily became areas of compulsory registration. After the ten years were up, compulsory registration was extended to Middlesex (1937) and the County Borough of Croydon (1939). Plans to extend it to Surrey in 1940 were abandoned due to the Second World War. In 1925 the government had forecast that the whole of England and Wales would be subject to compulsory registration by 1955, but the process took much longer.

In 1940, after damage sustained in the 193rd air raid on Central London, HM Land Registry was evacuated to the Marsham Court Hotel in Bournemouth so that it could carry on its normal business.

=== Post-war and beyond ===
In 1950, 88 years after its creation, HM Land Registry registered its one millionth title.

The growth in property ownership after the war years meant that the potential number of properties to be registered increased dramatically. This, in turn, slowed down the rate of land registration. To deal with the increasing workload, an office was opened in Tunbridge Wells in 1955 and a further office at Lytham St. Annes in 1957. In 1963, 101 years after the registry started, it registered its two millionth title.

Theodore Ruoff, who was appointed Chief Land Registrar in 1963, confirmed the three fundamental principles of Land Registration that had been laid down in the LRA 1925:

- The mirror principle — the register of title should reflect, accurately and completely, and beyond all argument, the facts that are material to the title.
- The curtain principle — the register should be the sole and definitive source of information for proposing purchasers, but should not reveal sensitive information.
- The insurance principle — if, as a result of human error, the title is proved to be defective in any way, then the person or persons suffering loss as a result must be able to claim compensation.

New offices were opened in Gloucester and Stevenage (1964), Durham and Harrow (1965), Plymouth (1966), Croydon and Swansea (1967), Birkenhead and Weymouth (1977), Peterborough (1978), Telford (1986), Coventry and Hull (1987), Leicester (1988), Portsmouth (1989), York (1991) and Lancashire (2000).

Land registers at this time were not public records, and processing them required laborious typing and the completion of plans by hand using paintbrushes and ink on linen. Copies of everything produced had to be made by hand. HM Land Registry retained the originals, and the copies were sewn, using needle and thread, into large certificates. The certificates were produced as indisputable evidence of the ownership of the land. Such was the importance of the certificates that tampering with them was a criminal offence.

In 1986 the Plymouth Office became the first HM Land Registry office to produce registers electronically. Computerisation dramatically increased the efficiency of the Land Register at a time when HM Land Registry was keen to bring the whole of England and Wales under compulsory registration.

In 1990 compulsory registration was extended to the whole of England and Wales, the ten millionth title was registered, and for the first time, the Land Register was opened to public inspection.

Although compulsory registration had now spread to the whole of its jurisdiction, it only became compulsory when a property was sold. This was a barrier to the registration of the whole of England and Wales, and in 1998 new triggers for registration were introduced, dramatically increasing the rate of registration of land. These triggers included gifts of land, assent of land on death and raising monies by mortgages on the land.

The Land Registration Act 2002 leaves the system substantially in place, but enables the future compulsory introduction of electronic conveyancing, using electronic signatures to transfer and register property. As a result of that act, Land and Charge Certificates are no longer issued.

The new home of the Information Systems department, a state-of-the-art office with 500 staff, was opened in 2005 in Plymouth's International Business Park.

== Chief Land Registrars ==
- Brent Spencer Follett (1862–1886)
- Robert Hallet Holt (1886–1900)
- Sir Charles Fortescue Brickdale (1900–1923)
- Sir John Stewart Stewart-Wallace (1923–1941)
- Rouxville Mark Lowe (1941–1947)
- Sir George Harold Curtis (1947–1963)
- Theodore Burton Fox Ruoff (1963–1974)
- Robert Burnell Roper (1974–1983)
- Eric John Pryer (1983–1990)
- John Manthorpe (1990–1996)
- Stuart John Hill (1996–1999)
- Peter Collis (1999–2010)
- Marco Pierleoni (2010–2011)
- Malcolm Dawson (2011–2013)
- Ed Lester (2013–2015)
- Graham Farrant (2015–2018)
- Mike Harlow (Acting) (2018–2019)
- Simon Hayes (2019–2025)
- Iain Banfield (Acting) (2025-)

== Title registers and plans ==
=== Title Plans and Registers ===
The HM Land Registry maintains two key documents for registered land in England and Wales: the title register and the title plan. These documents collectively provide essential information about a property’s ownership, boundaries, and associated rights or restrictions.

==== Title Register ====
The title register is a detailed record of ownership and legal interests for a specific registered estate. It is divided into three parts:

1. Property Register: The first entry describes the land contains in the registration (by its address where one exists), what kind of estate the registration is (i.e. an estate in land, an estate in profit à prendre in gross, an estate in rentcharge, or an estate in franchise) and it's tenure where applicable (i.e. freehold or leasehold). Subsequent entries may contain information on guaranteed beneficial easements and subjective easements (where a deed contains both a grant and reservation), provisions as to light, air, or boundary structures, and details of rights claimed by prescription. A leasehold registration will also contain the short-particulars of the registered lease, and entries regarding any variation thereof.
2. Proprietorship Register: Lists the name(s) of the current owner(s) and the class of title (most likely either absolute or possessory) with its tenure, and may also include purchase price information if recently transacted. Restriction in relation to third party interests are also entered in the Proprietorship Register.
3. Charges Register: Records any encumbrances, such as legal charges (commonly known as mortgages), restrictive covenants, or subjective easements (where a deed only burdens the land), affecting the property.

The title register is a legally binding document that is used in property transactions and disputes.

==== Title Plan ====
The title plan is a scaled map showing the general boundaries of the registered land or property. It is based on Ordnance Survey mapping and provides a visual representation of the property, including:

- Approximate boundary lines, typically outlined in red.
- Black lines show properties, walls and other physical elements.
- Sometimes boundary agreements, restrictive covenants and easements will be detailed, via colours, letters and symbols.

While the title plan is useful for understanding a property’s layout, it is not definitive in establishing exact legal boundaries.

==== Accessibility ====
The title register and title plan are accessible to the public for a nominal fee through the HM Land Registry’s website.

== Privatisation plans ==
On 23 January 2014, the Government issued a public consultation on its proposal to create a company to carry out the day-to-day process of land registration. This was proposed as either a Government or privately owned company, that would be subject to regulation from the Office of the Chief Land Registrar, which would remain part of Government. This proposal generated controversy in the media and was opposed by Land Registry staff. There was also opposition to the plans from legal professionals and other users of Land Registry services. In July 2014, the Government announced that further consideration was necessary and they would not be proceeding with any changes.

In November 2015, the Chancellor of the Exchequer reconsidered privatising the agency. Between the 24 March 2016 and the 26 May 2016, the government conducted a further consultation. During the consultation the plans faced opposition. The Conveyancing Association stated that "privatisation would not be in the best interests of clients". The Competition & Markets Authority (CMA) claimed that the privatisation would give a private organisation monopoly to commercially valuable data. The Land Registry provides some datasets without charging, and other data can be purchased. It transpired that all potential bidders were linked to tax havens. The privatisation plans were abandoned in the Autumn 2016 statement.

== See also ==
- Geospatial Commission
- Rural Land Register
- National Land and Property Gazetteer
- Housing in the United Kingdom
- Torrens system

== Bibliography ==
- Mayer, P. (1996). Ten Chief Land Registrars. London.
- Mayer, P. & Pemberton, A. (2000). "A Short History of Land Registry in England and Wales" (PDF) HM Land Registry. Retrieved 2026-06-29.
- Offer, A. (1981). Property and Politics: 1870–1914. Cambridge.
- Pemberton, A. (1992). HM Land Registry – An Historical Perspective. London: HM Land Registry.
- Riddall, J.G. (2003). Land Law. 7th ed., Lexis-Nexis Butterworths. ISBN 0-406-96743-1. Ch.26 for current law in England and Wales
- Rowton-Simpson, S. (1976). Land Law and Registration. Cambridge.
