= Intervention Board for Agricultural Produce =

The Intervention Board for Agricultural Produce, commonly just called the Intervention Board (IB), was a public authority in the United Kingdom from 1972 until 2001.

The Board was formed as a Government Department on 22 November 1972, under section 6 of the European Communities Act 1972, and was responsible under the Agriculture Ministers for the implementation of the guarantee functions of the Common Agricultural Policy. Policy matters remained the responsibility of the Agriculture Ministers. IB also operated the Over 30 Months Scheme during the BSE crisis in the 1990s.

The Board was abolished with effect from 14 November 2001 and its property, rights and liabilities transferred to the Secretary of State, the Scottish Ministers, the National Assembly for Wales and the Department for Agriculture and Rural Development in Northern Ireland. An executive agency, IB merged with the Ministry of Agriculture, Fisheries and Food’s (MAFF’s) Regional Service Centres to form the Rural Payments Agency.
