= Meat and Livestock Commission =

The Meat and Livestock Commission (MLC) was set up by the UK Government under the Agriculture Act 1967 with government money with the remit to promote the sale of red meat. The MLC was previously an independent non-departmental public body, but from 1 April 2008 it was superseded by the Agriculture and Horticulture Development Board.

== Funding ==
The MLC's income derived from a levy on every slaughtered carcass with additional funding directly from the government. As of 2007 it had an annual budget of £42 million for marketing and advertising to promote meat to the British population.

== Meat promotion ==
The MLC's remit was to "work with the British meat and livestock industry (cattle, sheep and pigs) to improve its efficiency and competitive position" and "to maintain and stimulate markets for British meat at home and abroad, while taking into account the needs of consumers."

In 2000 alone, the MLC and the government jointly funded a £4.6 million ad campaign to promote British pig meat.

== Controversy ==
In 2006 the British arm of People for the Ethical Treatment of Animals (PETA) unveiled a poster linking eating meat with child abuse. The MLC branded the poster "irresponsible". However, the Advertising Standards Authority (ASA) agreed that PETA can continue to place ads expressing this point of view, stating that "While we recognised that some viewers would find the text used in the ad inappropriate, we understood that PETA had intended to convey that, in their opinion, feeding meat to children, and thereby exposing them to potentially harmful influences, was tantamount to abuse".

== See also ==
- English Beef and Lamb Executive (EBLEX)
- Single Payment Scheme
