= Charles Brickdale =

British lawyer and civil servant

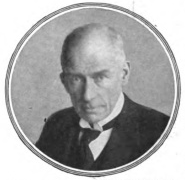
- Charles Fortescue Brickdale
- Born: Charles Fortescue Brickdale; 1 March 1857
- Died: 20 September 1944 (aged 87)
- Education: Westminster School; Christ Church, Oxford
- Occupation: Civil servant
- Known for: Reform of HM Land Registry as Chief Registrar
- Notable work: Law of Property Act 1925
- Parent(s): Matthew Brickdale (father); Sarah Lloyd (mother)

Sir Charles Fortescue Brickdale (1 March 1857 – 20 September 1944) was a British barrister and civil servant best known for his reform of HM Land Registry as Chief Registrar.

== Life ==
Brickdale was born on 1 March 1857 to Matthew Brickdale, a barrister, and his wife Sarah Lloyd. After attending Westminster School he matriculated to Christ Church, Oxford, and from there was called to the Bar by Lincoln's Inn in 1883, specialising in land law. In 1886, he published Registration of Title to Land and how to Establish it without Cost or Compulsion, in which he argued that the relatively new land registry department, which had so far proved ineffective, could massively improve if it was to follow the Australian and Prussian models. Two years later he was made assistant barrister at the Land Registry by Lord Halsbury, and used the position to argue for greater reform, which came in the form of the Land Transfer Act 1897.

The land registration system at the time was voluntary, and getting local organisations and conveyancers to accept was a long and difficult job. Brickdale was appointed Chief Registrar of HM Land Registry in 1900. During his time as Chief Registrar he turned the Land Registry into a fully functioning department and helped prepare the Law of Property Act 1925, which was put in place after his retirement in 1923. He was knighted for his work in 1911, and died on 20 September 1944.
