= Quality Meat Scotland =

Government agency in City of Edinburgh, Scotland

Agency overview
- Formed: 1990
- Type: Executive non-departmental public body
- Jurisdiction: Scotland
- Headquarters: Rural Centre, West Mains, Ingliston, Newbridge
- Employees: 28 (Q1 2022)
- Agency executives: Kate Rowell, Chair; Sarah Millar, Chief Executive
- Website: www.qmscotland.co.uk

Quality Meat Scotland (QMS) is an executive non-departmental public body of the Scottish Government. It promotes the red meat sector and markets the Protected Geographical Indication Scotch Beef and Scotch Lamb brands.

It was set up in 1990 as the Scottish Quality Beef & Lamb Association to provide assurance to industry and consumers that animals produced for the food chain met certain standards. In 2000 it was renamed to Quality Meat Scotland and in 2008 it was established on a statutory basis replacing the Meat and Livestock Commission.

== Controversies ==
In 2021, covert footage was shot at a high welfare farm owned by Philip Sleigh, the chairman of the pig standard-setting committee at Quality Meat Scotland. Footage showed farmers hammering pigs to death, weak piglets being slammed into concrete floors and pigs with severe untreated prolapses. Animal Equality UK said "Rubbing shoulders with government officials and accreditation reps, Philip Sleigh was entrusted with a position of power, yet his own farm breached the very standards he helped set".

== See also ==
- Agriculture and Horticulture Development Board
- Meat Promotion Wales
- Livestock & Meat Commission for Northern Ireland
