= Bazna pig =

Breed of pig

Bazna
- Other names: Basner; Porcul de Banat
- Country of origin: Romania

Traits

Notes
- Cross between Mangalitsa and Berkshire

The Bazna, also known as the Basner, Porcul de Banat, or Romanian Saddleback, is a breed of domestic pig native to Transylvania, in present day Romania. The breed was first created in 1872 from crosses between the Mangalitsa and Berkshire pig breeds. The Bazna is primarily black with a white ring circling its trunk, starting at the shoulders and including the forelimbs. The breed was officially recognized in 1958.

== History ==
The development of the Bazna breed started in 1872 from crosses between the Mangalitsa and Berkshire breeds. As the breed formed and developed, Yorkshire, Angler Sattelschwein, Wessex, and Hampshire breeds were all used to help homogenize and better it.

The Bazna breed was officially recognized in 1958.

The breed is native to Transylvania, in present day Romania. Upon developing, the breed was distributed to several towns in the Transylvania, and again after World War II when the breed was distributed further around the Transylvania region and Banat.

== See also ==
- List of domestic pig breeds
