= EBLEX =

EBLEX ("English Beef and Lamb Executive"), now called AHDB Beef and Lamb is a division of the Agriculture and Horticulture Development Board (AHDB) and delivers services to beef and lamb levy payers in England. It exists to enhance the competitiveness and sustainability of the English beef and lamb sector. It was renamed Beef and Lamb in June 2015. Its functions and aims remain unchanged.

== Function ==
AHDB Beef and Lamb have the following aims:

- To help the English beef and sheep meat supply chain become more efficient
- To add value to the English beef and sheep meat industry.

It is funded through a statutory levy paid to the AHDB on all beef and sheep animals slaughtered in, or live animals exported from, England.
