= Stoneleigh Park =

Business park in Warwickshire, England

Coordinates: 52.343°N 1.527°W

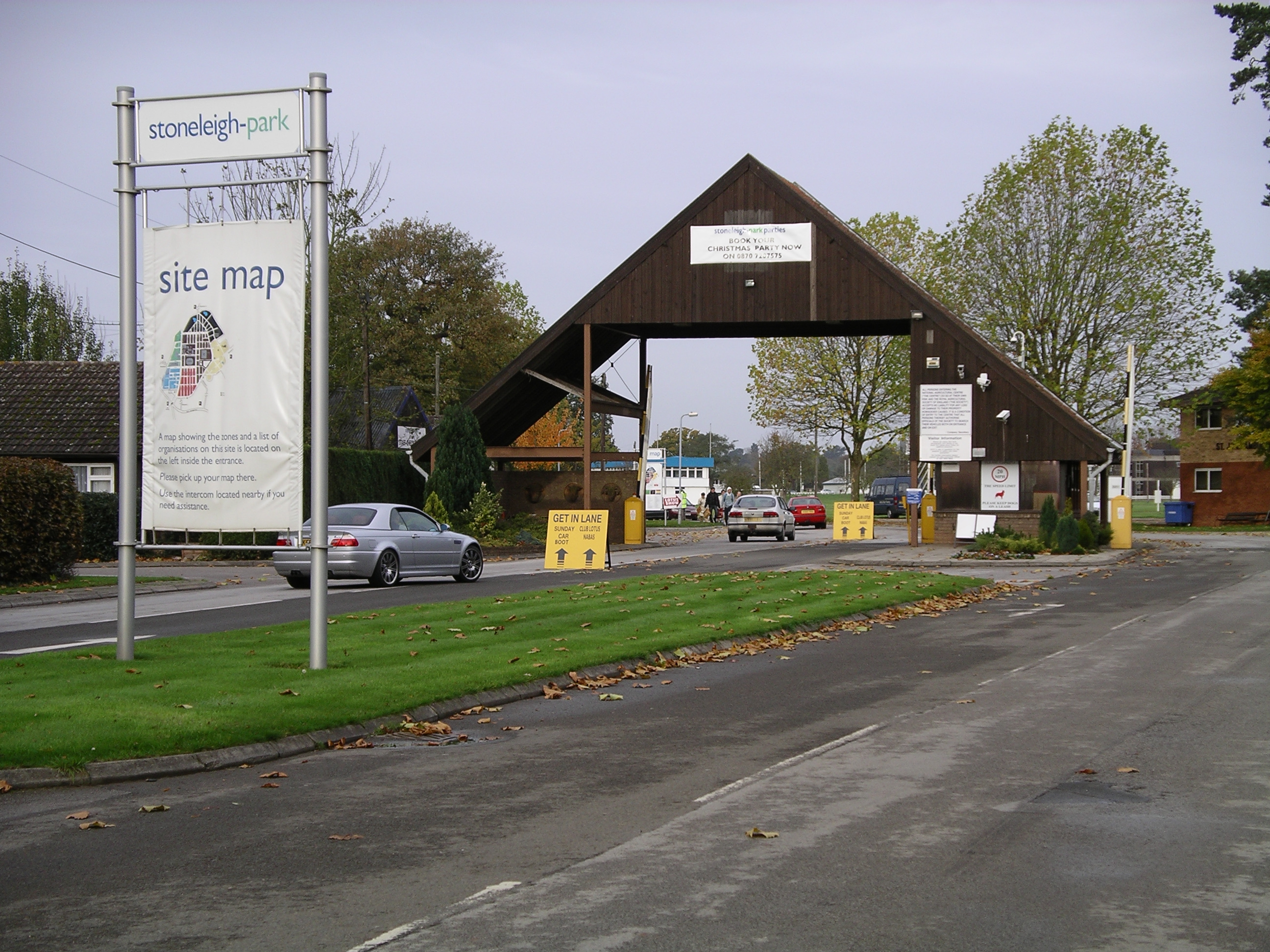
Entrance to Stoneleigh Park

Stoneleigh Park, known between 1963 and 2013 as the National Agricultural Centre, is a business park located south-west of the village of Stoneleigh, Warwickshire, England. It is home to the NAEC Stoneleigh conference and exhibition centre.

== History ==
The park was once part of the much larger Stoneleigh Abbey estate which was created in 1154 when Henry II granted land in the Forest of Arden to a group of Cistercians monks from Staffordshire. It was separated from the rest of the estate and developed only in 1963 when the Royal Agricultural Society of England decided to permanently base their previous nomadic Royal Show there, after it had been on tour annually since 1839. The popular annual Town and Country Festival started on the site in 1973. In 1978 it hosted the outdoor European Archery Championships, being the first UK venue to do so. 2003 saw the National Farmers' Union of England and Wales move their headquarters to the park.

The Royal Show was held for the last time in 2009 after a 170-year history, following the Town and Country finishing in 2006 after 35 years. In December 2010 the Royal Agricultural Society ceased running the park, agreeing a 150-year lease with American company LaSalle Investment Management for a reported £50 million. By 2018, 27 units had been refurbished and that year 26 were demolished as being unviable. The park struggled financially during 2020 and 2021 due to the global COVID-19 pandemic. At the same time work was started on a section of High Speed 2 railway line which will run through a north east portion of the site.

== Business park ==
The site covers about 800 acres (320 ha), 250 acres (100 ha) of which is maintained, and is home to over 70 businesses, including an exhibition and conference centre.

It was announced on 12 April 2010 that Stoneleigh Events would play host to The Great Exhibition 2012, a festival showcasing the best of British taking place in the Olympic summer of 2012 and also as a tribute to the original Great Exhibition at Hyde Park in 1851.

NAEC Stoneleigh hosts a range of events including Race Retro, International Jaguar Spares day and the MG & Triumph spares day.

NAEC Stoneleigh has: -

- Over 21,000m^{2} of indoor exhibition space
- 800 acres of event and activity space
- Conference facilities for up to 12,000 people
- On site hotel
- An off-road vehicle track
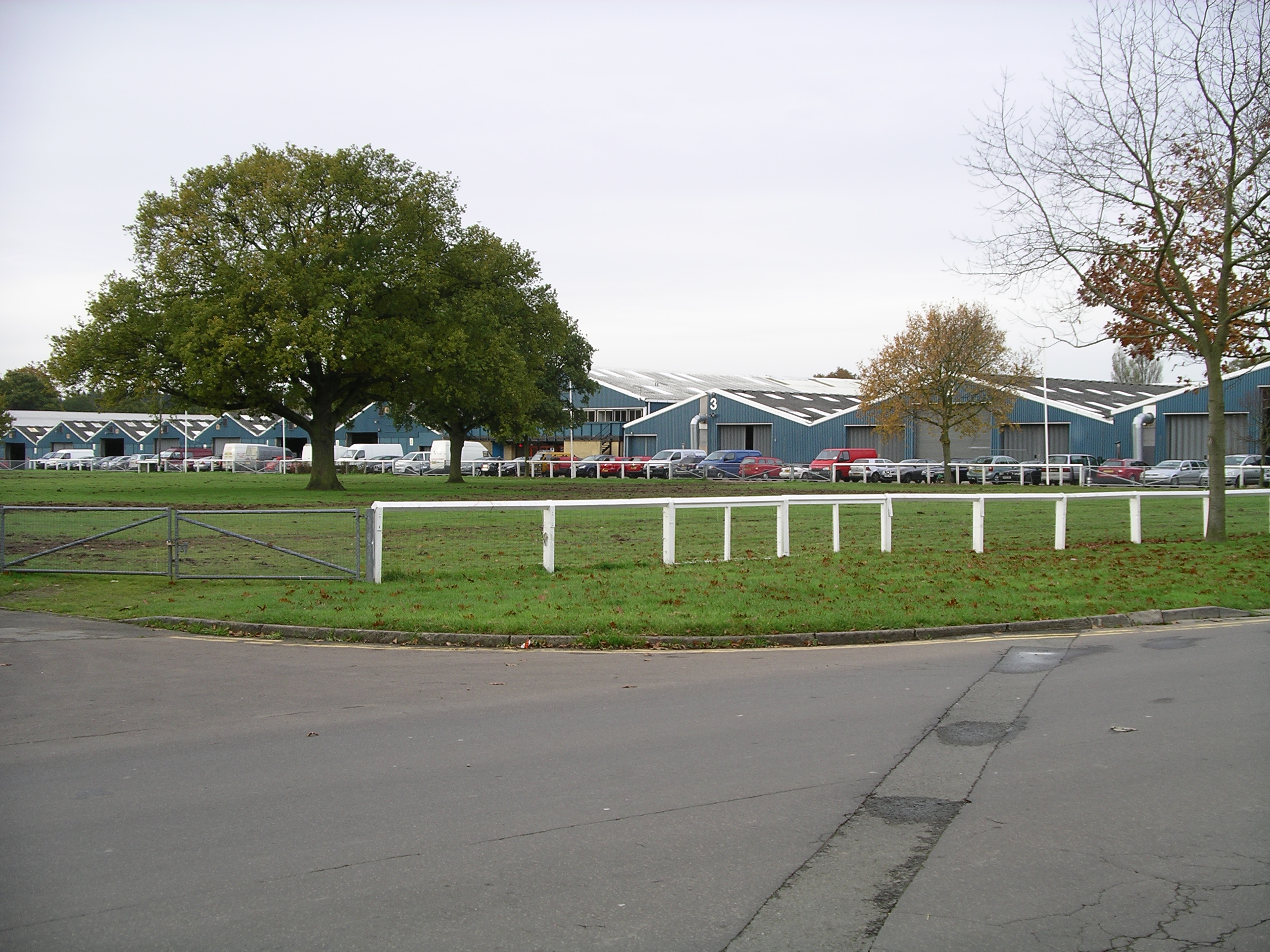
Buildings in Stoneleigh Park

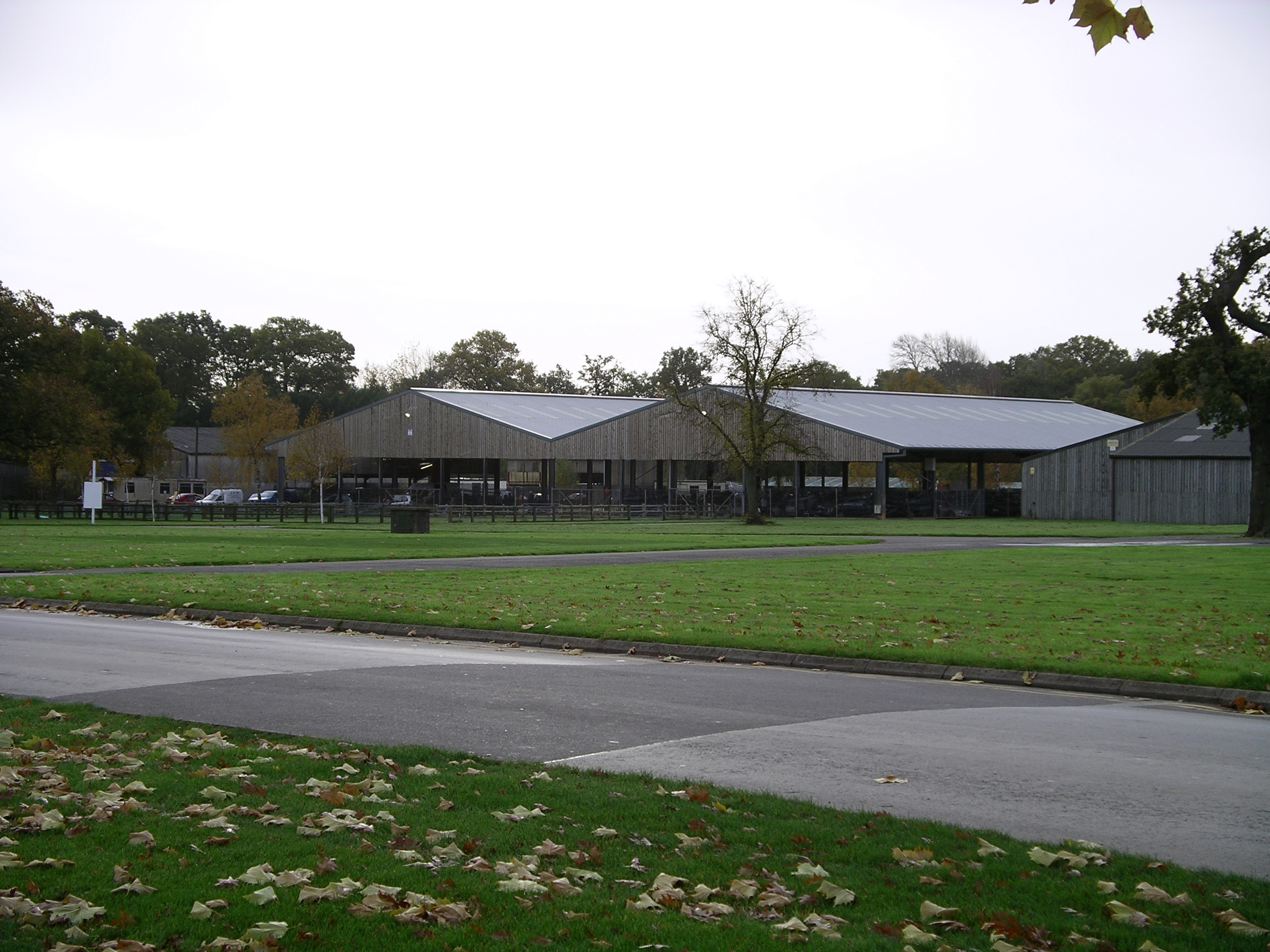
Cow sheds in Stoneleigh Park
