= Agriculture and Horticulture Development Board =

UK non-departmental public body funded by farmers and growers

- Abbreviation: AHDB
- Formation: 2007
- Legal status: Non-Departmental Public Body
- Purpose: Help UK agriculture be more competitive and sustainable
- Location: Stoneleigh Park, Warwickshire
- Region served: UK
- Members: British farmers and agricultural workers
- Chair: Emily Norton
- Main organ: AHDB Board
- Parent organization: Department for Environment, Food and Rural Affairs
- Budget: £56 million
- Website: AHDB

The Agriculture and Horticulture Development Board (AHDB) is a statutory levy board and an executive non-departmental public body sponsored by the Department for Environment, Food & Rural Affairs (Defra). Funded primarily by a compulsory levy on farmers, growers, and others in the supply chain, the AHDB aims to improve farm business efficiency, productivity, and competitiveness through research and development, market intelligence, and export development.

Historically, the AHDB operated across six divisions. However, following a significant period of industry friction in 2021, the organisation underwent a major contraction. Following democratic ballots, the statutory levies for the Horticulture and Potato sectors were abolished in April 2022.

As of 2025, the AHDB provides statutory services to four remaining sectors.

== History ==
It was formed on 1 April 2008, from five previous organisations which were similarly levy-funded, which were the British Potato Council; the Home-Grown Cereals Authority; the Horticultural Development Council; the Meat and Livestock Commission; and the Milk Development Council.

It was created using powers granted under the Natural Environment and Rural Communities Act 2006.

In 2024, the AHDB ran an advertising campaign called "Let's Eat Balanced", encouraging the consumption of meat and milk. Objections were raised to the campaign by medical groups and other campaigners, stating that this went counter to evidence-based standards for healthy eating.

== Function ==
The AHDB acts as a centralised research and promotion hub for specific agricultural sectors. It is tasked with providing services that are deemed "market failures"—tasks that individual farms are too small to perform on their own, but which benefit the industry as a whole. Its primary operations include:

- Agrochemical Approvals: Managing the legal paperwork (EAMUs) required for farmers to use specific pesticides and herbicides.
- Consumer Advertising: Funding national TV and print campaigns to promote the consumption of British meat and dairy.
- Market Data: Tracking and publishing daily commodity prices to provide transparency in the supply chain.
- Technical Research: Funding independent trials on crop yields, animal disease prevention, and soil health.

== Funding ==
Farmers, growers and others in the food supply chain pay a statutory levy and in return receive services that they might not otherwise be able to afford to invest in, like research and development, market intelligence information and trade development and marketing. The levy rate is recommended by advisory boards composed of levy payers and agreed by the AHDB Board and by UK Ministers.

== Structure ==
Following the 2022 changes to regulations made under statutory authority to give effect to the will of stakeholders in the sectors voted to strip certain functions, the AHDB is now structured with four active operating divisions representing the commodity sectors covered by its current statutory remit:

- pork in England
- dairy (milk) in Great Britain
- beef and lamb in England
- cereals and oilseeds in the United Kingdom

== Controversy ==
The board has been the subject of significant industry debate since 2021, primarily concerning the legitimacy of the mandatory levy system and the transition of funds between public and private entities

=== Levy abolition and the "democratic deficit" ===
In early 2021, grassroots movements within the horticulture and potato sectors triggered statutory ballots on whether to continue the mandatory levy.

The results showed a clear majority in favour of abolition, with 61% of horticulture growers and 66% of potato growers voting to end the system.

Following the results, Alison Capper, who was then serving as the Chair of the NFU Horticulture and Potatoes Board, faced criticism for her response to the vote. She publicly emphasised that when the ballot was weighted by the financial value of the levy paid—rather than a one-member-one-vote basis—57% of the industry appeared to support its continuation. This interpretation was widely characterised by "rebel" growers and industry petitioners as a "democratic deficit," leading to accusations that sector leadership was attempting to undermine a democratic mandate in order to protect the interests of large-scale agribusinesses and the board's own institutional status.

Despite this internal industry friction, the UK government and the devolved administrations ultimately respected the outcome of the ballots. The mandatory levies were formally abolished through the Agriculture and Horticulture Development Board (Amendment) Order 2022 (S.I. 2022 No. 577). This instrument, which amended the original 2008 Order, removed the board's duty to impose levies on the horticultural and potato industries in Great Britain, effective from April 2022.

=== Surplus fund transfer to Horticulture Crop Protection UK Limited ===
The termination of the horticulture levy led to a secondary dispute over the disposal of approximately £6 million in remaining reserves. In late 2022, the board announced an agreement in principle to transfer up to £1 million of these surplus funds as a startup grant to a newly established private company, Horticulture Crop Protection Ltd.

Alison Capper, who had been a central figure in the preceding levy debate, was appointed as the Chair of orticulture Crop Protection UK Limited upon its formal commencement in April 2023.

This appointment of Capper and the subsequent fund transfer drew sharp criticism from the original levy petitioners, who argued that statutory funds collected under a now-revoked mandate should have been returned to the growers rather than being used to seed a private entity led by individuals from the existing industry establishment. While the board defended the grant as a pragmatic measure to ensure the continuity of essential pesticide and crop protection approvals, critics viewed the move as a breach of trust and a bypass of the 2021 ballot's intent.

=== Interconnected leadership and NFU/NFU Mutual ===
The board's leadership has been frequently scrutinised for its close ties to other major agricultural institutions, a structure critics describe as an "interlocking directorate" between the AHDB, the National Farmers' Union (NFU), and the insurer NFU Mutual.

A prominent example cited by industry observers is Ali Capper, who simultaneously held senior roles as:

- a director of NFU Mutual,
- the Chair of the NFU Horticulture and Potatoes Board,
- Chair of Horticulture Crop Protection UK Limited.

=== Debt Collection and Legal Enforcement ===
Resentment among growers was further fueled by the AHDB's decision to continue legal enforcement against farmers for unpaid 2021/22 levy bills: the final collection period before the sectors were abolished. Critics called it hypocritical for a body being shuttered by a democratic vote to use the courts to extract money from the very people who had voted it out of existence.

== See also ==
- Quality Meat Scotland
- Meat Promotion Wales
- Livestock & Meat Commission for Northern Ireland
