= Illegal, unreported and unregulated fishing =

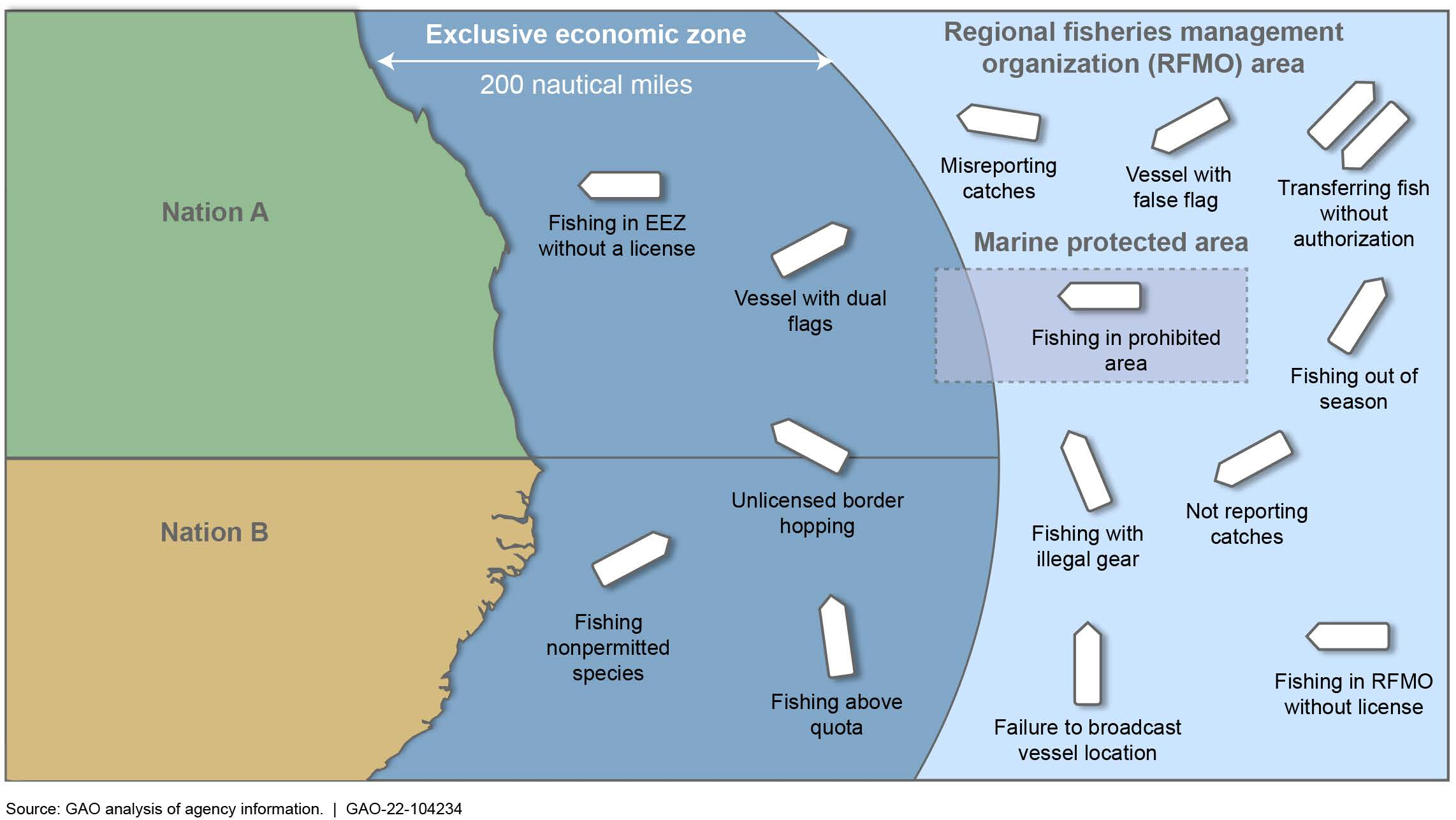
Types of illegal, unreported and unregulated fishing

Illegal, unreported and unregulated fishing (IUU) is a broad term that refers to fishing without the permission of a government, or in contravention of its laws and regulations; unreported or misreported fishing; and fishing that is conducted in an area with no applicable conservation or management measures. IUU is an issue around the world. The fishing industry observers believe IUU occurs in most fisheries, and accounts for up to 30% of total catches in some important fisheries.

Illegal fishing takes place when vessels or harvesters operate in violation of the laws of a fishery. This can apply to fisheries that are under the jurisdiction of a coastal state or to high seas fisheries regulated by regional fisheries management organisations (RFMO). According to the UN Food and Agriculture Organization (FAO), Fisheries and Aquaculture Department, illegal fishing has caused losses estimated at US$23 billion per year.

Unreported fishing is fishing that has been unreported or misreported to the relevant national authority or RFMO, in contravention of applicable laws and regulations.

Unregulated fishing generally refers to fishing by vessels without nationality, vessels flying the flag of a country not party to the RFMO governing that fishing area or species on the high seas, or harvesting in unregulated areas.

IUU fishing poses a global challenge and has significant economic and environmental repercussions. The impact of IUU fishing includes economic losses, job losses, scarcity, price distortion, food insecurity and unfair competition, together with the depletion of fish populations and damages to the marine habitat. The most affected areas by this phenomenon are Africa, Asia, and Latin America. The Chinese commercial fishing fleet is responsible for more IUU fishing than that of any other nation.

The drivers behind illegal, unreported and unregulated (IUU) fishing are similar to those behind many other types of international environmental crime: pirate fishers have a strong economic incentive – many species of fish, particularly those that have been over-exploited and are thus in short supply, are of high financial value. Such IUU activity may then show a high chance of success – i.e. a high rate of return – from the failure of governments to regulate adequately (e.g. inadequate coverage of international agreements), or to enforce national or international laws (e.g. because of lack of capacity, or poor levels of governance). A particular driver behind IUU fishing is the failure of a number of flag states to exercise effective regulation over ships on their registers – which in turn creates an incentive for ships to register under these flags of convenience.

== Environmental impacts ==
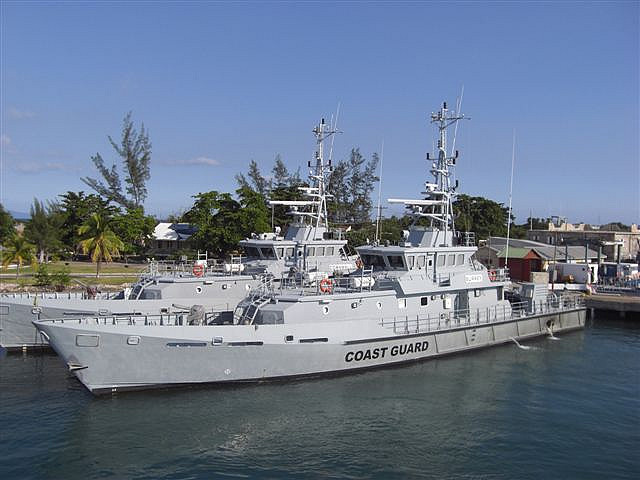
Patrol vessels like this Jamaican Coast Guard vessel are used for fisheries' protection

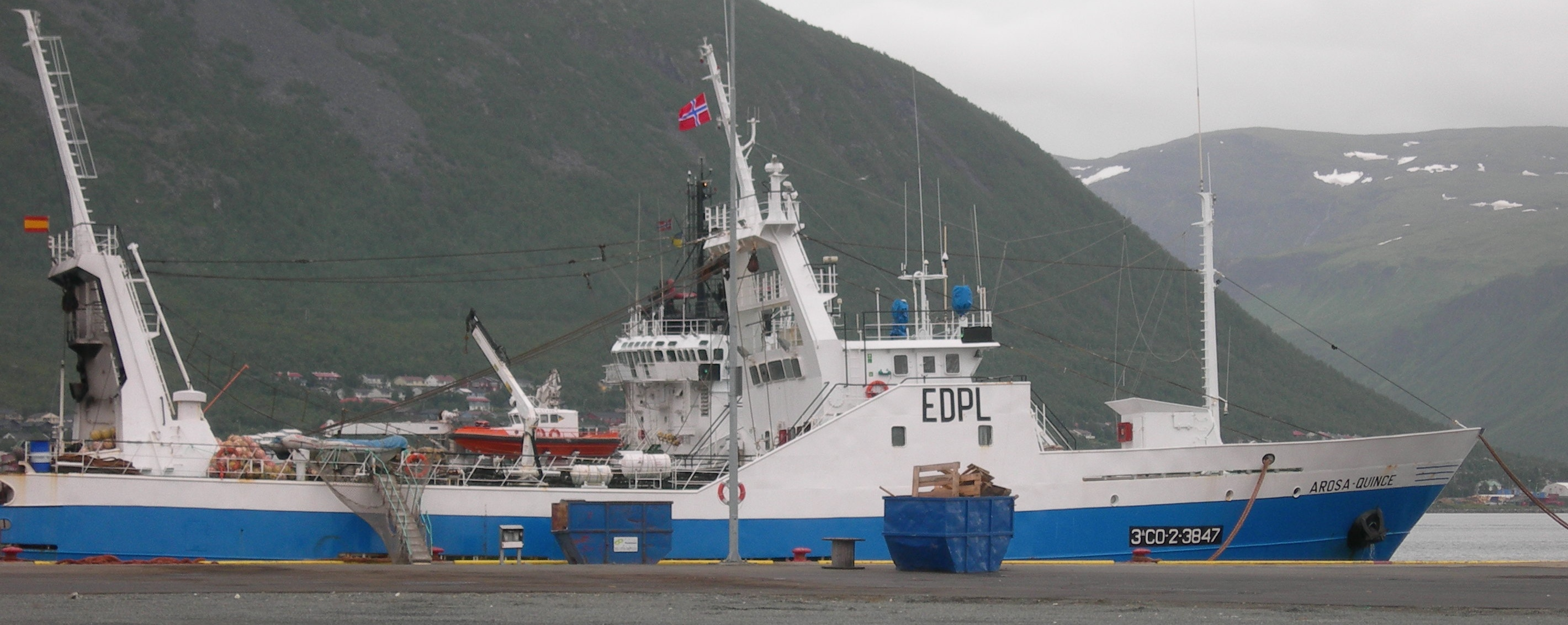
Trawler arrested by the Norwegian Coast Guard for illegal fishing

The environmental effects of IUU fishing include biodiversity loss, and damages to the marine flora and ecosystem, and are generally caused by illegal fishing methods, overfishing and bycatch.

Illegal fishing methods usually damage the seabed and the marine flora: fishing gears, chemicals, and explosions, can affect organisms' growth and cause sediment transport, which blocks or reduces light, endangering the growth and settlement of oysters and scallop. Fishing gears and fishing methods in prohibited areas often damage the habitat, leading to environmental damage and fish detriment. Examples include the use of bottom trawling, which destroys sponges that take decades to regrow, and the use of fishing gears like beach seines and dynamite fishing, which highly damage the reef ecosystems and can kill up to 80% of the coral reef in the target areas.

The impact on fish stock is an effect of overfishing and overharvesting, which can damage the ecosystem biodiversity and can create an imbalance in the food chain, thus affecting predators, forage species, and marine mammals. In addition, the catch of high market valued species, such as tuna and sharks, contribute to the depletion of fish stocks, causing both environmental effects, and food scarcity. Bycatch further exacerbates fish depletion and ecosystem damage, because the catch is often left in the ocean, contributing to ocean pollution, harming marine life, and impacting the honest fishermen' economy, who cannot sell that fish if they catch it.

=== Africa ===
In Eastern Africa, the coasts in Tanzania suffer the use of trawlers from foreign vessels, which impact the ecosystem, fish and crustaceans, upon which fishers rely: this can create food scarcity, and possible job losses for the local fishermen. The coasts are subjected to bycatch of turtles and dolphins. The problem of IUU fishing in Mozambique and Tanzania sometimes derives from fishermen themselves, who fish during closed seasons in protected areas, and buy illegal catch from other vessels, to process it and sell it in exchange for shrimp, which are overfished. The country also suffers the use of dynamite fishing, which destroys coral reefs, sea-grass beds, mangroves, and salt marshes, thus compromising the habitat. In Kenya, the overexploitation of some kinds of fish has led to a disproportionate increase in their forage, such as the sea urchin, which feeds on the reef, thus reducing the coral cover dramatically.

Mauritius, situated 800 km east of Madagascar, has a land area of 2040 km2 and an exclusive economic zone (EEZ) of 2.3 million square kilometres, which is difficult to patrol and control, given its resources. This leads to massive Illegal, unreported and unregulated fishing by foreign fishing fleets including the Taiwanese fleet, which has the biggest fleet based in Port Louis and is documented as flouting the law, including human rights, worldwide multiple times on record. Mauritian fishing cooperatives also allegedly engage in illegal, unreported and unregulated fishing and are sometimes apprehended but their movements are impossible to track. The country includes the Cargados Carajos Shoals.

West Africa has been consistently identified as the global epicentre of IUU fishing, with estimates indicating that up to 37% of fish caught in the region are unreported or illegal. Evidence of foreign industrial fleets exploit enforcement gaps, weak governance, and limited maritime capacity to extract significant marine resources, often undermining the livelihoods of artisanal fishing communities. While West Africa has received growing scholarly and policy attention, the South Atlantic remains relatively underexplored in academic literature despite facing similar vulnerabilities. The region's large Exclusive Economic Zones, rich biodiversity, and relatively limited enforcement infrastructure have made it particularly susceptible to incursions by foreign industrial fleets. Despite the existence of global governance instruments such as the United Nations Convention on the Law of the Sea (UNCLOS) and the FAO Code of Conduct for Responsible Fisheries, which call for the conservation and sustainable use of marine living resources, West Africa has substantial IUU activity.

In addition to its socioeconomic impacts, IUU fishing in West Africa has severe environmental consequences. Illegal vessels frequently use destructive fishing techniques, such as bottom trawling and the use of fine-mesh or prohibited gear, which lead to seabed degradation, habitat destruction, and the bycatch of juvenile and non-target species. These practices contribute to the collapse of fish stocks, disrupt marine food webs, and threaten the long-term sustainability of marine biodiversity in the region. The lack of adequate monitoring means that endangered species, such as sharks, sea turtles, and marine mammals, are often caught unintentionally and discarded at sea, contributing to biodiversity loss. IUU fishing contributes to unsustainable levels of fishing pressure on species such as sardinella, horse mackerel, and hake, many of which are essential for both ecological balance and food security. The overfishing of these species reduces prey availability for larger marine predators and alters the structure of marine ecosystems. In parts of the South Atlantic, particularly in Angola and Namibia, IUU fishing has also been associated with increased levels of pollution and discarded fishing gear, which exacerbate marine plastic waste and further damage fragile ocean habitats.

Climate change is compounding these effects. Warmer sea temperatures and shifting fish distributions make stocks more vulnerable to IUU exploitation, particularly in upwelling zones such as the Canary and Benguela Currents. In such regions, depleted fish stocks recover more slowly due to changes in ocean productivity and nutrient flows, magnifying the long-term ecological toll of illegal fishing.

=== Asia-Pacific Region ===
Overfishing and bycatching in the Asia-Pacific region are destroying coral reefs and are depleting endangering the species by non-respecting the safe biological quota for fish replenishment. Moreover, the destructive fishing practices in the region involve the use of cyanide to poison reef fish: as a consequence, 56% of coral reefs in Southeast Asia are at risk, especially in the Paracel Islands, Indonesia, Taiwan, Philippines, and Malaysia. Dynamite fishing has destroyed 50% of the coral reef in Southeast Asia, endangering the food security of the population who relies on fish as primary food and income.

=== Oceania ===
In Australia, IUU fishing is affecting biodiversity, and is leading to a decrease of legal fish traps in favor of the illegal ones. Illegal fishing is endangering the species of sea cucumber and oysters, leading to fish depletion, and damages to the ecosystem. Bycatch and illegal fishing are the main causes of turtle decrease in stock. The most endangered species by IUU fishing are scale fish, rock lobster, sharks and billfish. Bycatch in New Zealand has endangered the survival of the Maui dolphins., and dynamite fishing in the continent is killing corals that takes centuries to rebuild.

=== Europe ===
Overall, bycatching in the European regions is threatening the extinction of many species, such as sharks, rays, and tuna. IUU fishing in the Mediterranean Sea has significant environmental effects: for example, many species, such as shrimps and octopus are highly declining in their stock due to IUU catches, which also puts biodiversity at risk. Bycatch is extremely frequent, endangering species like dogfish and dolphins, while trawling is damaging seagrass beds and endangering endemic species like sponges, white sharks, and stingrays. Those activities not only are compromising the species, but are also undermining the fisheries in the region.

=== Americas ===
The main environmental effects in the Americas involve the depletion of fish stock, the extermination of fish populations and the devastation of local ecosystems. In Ecuador, shark finning has led to the decline in size of shark catch, and overfishing and IUU fishing is leading to a depletion of the resources; in Guyana, bycatch is endangering turtles' survival; in Chile, harvesting seaweed is destroying the marine ecosystem, and in Costa Rica, the use of dynamite as a fishing method is reducing fishing species, destroying the food chain and damaging the habitat. IUU in Cuba is leading to a decrease in lobster stocks, decreasing the fish population, and thus endangering the marine food chain, causing food insecurity for the population in the area. Illegal fishing during spawning season is destroying the fishing reproduction and restoration in Panama. In California, bycatch is endangering many species of vaquita.

=== Arctic ===
IUU fishing in the Arctic contributes to the depletion of fish stocks and disrupts marine ecosystems, particularly in the Barents Sea and the Russian Far East. In the Barents Sea, illegal harvesting of Northeast Arctic cod reached levels during the 2000s that threatened the sustainability of the stock and undermined established fishing quotas. The ecological effects of fishing in the region also include bycatch and impacts on non-target species. Fish in the Barents Sea are a vital part of the survival of seabirds, seals and cetaceans, while shrimp trawling can catch juvenile cod, haddock, redfish and Greenland halibut. IUU fishing can compound these pressures by exceeding agreed-upon limits or by circumventing restrictions intended to protect stocks and ecosystems. The Arctic's relatively sensitive marine ecosystem may make additional fishing pressure particularly significant. Research on Arctic fisheries emphasizes the fragile interaction between fishing pressure, changing environmental conditions and the dynamics of commercial fish stocks.

=== Persian Gulf ===
IUU fishing in the Persian Gulf has contributed to a depletion of commercially valuable fish and shrimp stocks and has affected non-target species through bycatch. In Hormozgan Province, illegal shrimp fishing has been associated with substantial catches of non-target species with observer-based research recording more than 40 bycatch species. Illegal trawling and fishing during seasonal closure can also increase the depletion of demersal fish and other marine organisms in the area.

=== South Pacific ===
IUU fishing in the South Pacific contributes to the depletion of fish stocks. llegal fishing can reduce the abundance of commercially and ecologically important species and undermine fisheries management resources intended to maintain sustainable populations. In some Pacific Island fisheries, illegal harvesting has included the removal of juvenile fish before they reach reproductive maturity, potentially reducing the capacity of stocks to recover.

IUU fishing also affects non-target species. Fishing activities in the South Pacific can result in the bycatch of sharks, sea turtles and marine mammals, while illegal or destructive fishing practices can damage coral reefs and other vulnerable marine habitats. The removal of species such as sea cucumbers can also affect coastal ecosystems, particularly where harvesting is intensive and poorly regulated. The ecological consequences of IUU fishing are therefore not limited to the direct removal of illegally caught fish, but can include broader changes to marine habitats and food webs.

== Economic impacts ==
The economic effects of IUU fishing affect both the parties directly involved, such as the employment sector, the storing and transport sector and the stores, and indirect parties, such as the population and the government.

IUU fishing makes the global economy lose between $10 billion and $23 billion annually, and is valued up to $23.5 billion, placing it among the most profitable natural resource crimes. According to some studies, annual global losses due to IUU fishing account between $25 and $50 billion, tax revenues losses for countries are up to $4 billion. The major economic impacts of IUU fishing are unfair competition, job losses, declining revenues for legal fishers, tax revenue losses for governments, poverty and food insecurity for artisanal fishers and fishing communities, price distortion and overexploitation of fish stock.

Unfair competition and subsequent job losses happen when legal and illegal catches are both sold on the same markets: the abundance of illegal catches drives the prices down, forcing legitimate and honest fishermen to sell the product at a lower price and bear the operating costs for conservation and management measures, ultimately endangering their profits and generally leading to economic deficit. Furthermore, because illegal fish in the market often lacks quality controls, this latter can compromise the overall brand perception, and thus impact honest sellers by devaluating the product. Illegal fishing activities within the exclusive economic zones (EEZs) of coastal states by unauthorized vessels can lead to serious economic losses for both the affected coastal State and its industries, and local fishermen lose potential opportunity of catching and selling the fish in the market. Another economic impact concerns the loss of government revenue from license fees, as well as sales and export taxes: IUU vessels evade these fees and taxes, sometimes by transporting fish through various countries to avoid taxation, or by transferring catches to other vessels while on the high sea, thus reducing export earnings for the government, and resulting in losses for the transport industries as well.

Food insecurity is another effect of IUU fishing. Illegal fishing undermines the economy and human security of coastal communities, impacting the stock assessment by distorting the record of catches in that area, thus leading to wrong calculus on the fish exploitation. By un-reporting, IUU fishing often makes the countries set higher catching levels than the one necessary to guarantee the replenishment of fish population, which leads to food scarcity and dangers for the survival of the species. As fish stock diminishes, fishermen struggle to meet the needs of their families and their community, resulting in economic losses and food insecurity for the coastal population, which relies on it as a primary source of protein. Consequently, countries are compelled to import fish for domestic consumption, resulting in additional economic losses. The impacts of IUU are interconnected: as stocks decrease, the value of catch rises, thereby increasing the likelihood of overfishing, and illegal fishing.

=== Africa ===
In South Africa the value of IUU fishing for tonnages are 20 times the legal catch, and for the lobster resource, IUU fishing accounts for 25% of the total. In Eastern Africa, unsustainable fishing causes loss of income and a decrease in fish stocks; in Tanzania, in 2001 $20 million was lost due to IUU fishing, and in Somalia the IUU catches removed more than $450 million in fish value to the country. In the Western region, IUU fish loss per boat per year is estimated to be up to $3 million, and in Senegal, the country lost 2% of its GDP in 2012. IUU fishing in the region results in price distortion and unfair competition. Nigeria has a loss estimated between $30 million to $800 million from illegal fisheries. Illegal fishing in the Central African region is creating high risk to food security, and in Gabon is having severe economic impacts on the GDP.

=== Asia-Pacific Region ===
In 2003, the value of IUU fishing in the Asian Pacific economies was between $3102 million and $7312 million. Illegal fishing impacts many economies in the region, and the degradation of marine environment by illegal fishing affects ecotourism and contributes to loss of employment and nutrition for the populations relying on fish as primary source of protein. IUU fishing in the Asia-Pacific usually leads to tax evasions, money laundering and document fraud.

Illegal fishing by Indian fishermen in Sri Lankan waters in large numbers have led to several confrontations, including several deaths reported among Indian fishermen and Sri Lanka Navy that regularly intercept Indian fishing boats under the "Fisheries and Aquatic Resources Act No 2 of 1996".

=== Oceania ===
In many Oceanian countries, fish highly contributes to GDP, and impacts the livelihood of domestic populations: Indonesia and Papua New Guinea highly suffer from economic consequences of IUU fishing. Illegal fishing presents a serious challenge to Oceanians countries, because it creates a high fish stock depletion, and endangers marine environment. In Australia, IUU fishing is making the government spend a fortune to address the threat, thus highly impacting public spending: the country has been investing millions of dollars towards the fight against IUU fishing, which endangers the economies of the regions with limited financial capabilities, who must contribute to the public spending.

=== Americas ===
IUU fishing led to $2.3 billion losses in South America, together with $600 million income losses and $500 million tax revenue losses. The IUU in Jamaica impacts the local fish stock, and has caused $284 million losses in the past twenty years. The subsequent establishment of a fishing quota to guarantee the replenishment of the species has been endangering the local fisheries, and the overexploitation has created food insecurity for domestic consumption. In Argentina, IUU fishing has led to unfair competition among legal fisheries, who cannot compete with the foreign fleets that don't pay taxes or licenses. In the Caribbean and Ecuador, IUU fishing and its environmental damages to the coral reefs has endangered the tourism in those places, who cannot attract people anymore because the marine environment is damaged by illegal fishing practices; moreover, IUU fishing in Ecuador is now leading to food insecurity in the region.

The challenges facing Brazil's coastal fisheries, particularly within its largest Marine Protected Area (MPA), compounding this issue is the economic incentive structure driving overexploitation. The high market value of species such as green and red lobsters, worth as much as US$32/kg on the international market, has created a boom in extraction, often illegal, which has contributed to stock collapse. Lobster populations in Brazil are now at just 18% of their natural biomass. Despite an official lobster fleet of 2,900 boats, illegal catches are widespread, and in 2019 alone, over 6,000 tons were exported, generating more than US$92.5 million, regardless of legality. As the country pursues formal regulatory recognition of this trade, external demand continues to exert pressure on fragile stocks

=== Europe ===
In the Mediterranean Sea, 50% of tuna and swordfish catch come from IUU fishing, while in the North Sea 50% of cod and 60% of all catch comes from IUU fishing. In the Baltic Sea, 40% of cod comes from illegal fishing, and in the Iberian coast 40% of tuna, leading to an overexploitation of the resources and loss of catch for the local and legal fisheries. In Europe, countries lost up to €10 billion from IUU fishing, €8 billion for stock value, and more than 27 000 people lost their jobs.

== Certification and labeling ==
Mandatory product certification and catch documentation are increasingly part of fishery monitoring and enforcement, and to exclude IUU products from consumer markets. Certification is also used for timber and for diamonds, which have analogous enforcement problems. Labels can reward harvesters and supply chains which honor regulations. Labeling may also provide accountability for adaptive management planning, as well-managed fisheries may provide higher quality products and more stable economics for producers.

The use of certification or catch document schemes is encouraged in the FAO's International Plan of Action on IUU Fishing. Several RFMOs include them, including CCAMLR's Catch Documentation Scheme for Toothfish, CCSBT's Trade Information Scheme for Southern Bluefin Tuna and ICCAT's Bluefin Tuna Statistical Document Programme. Similar systems are applied at a national level, including the USA's Certification of Origin of Tuna and Tuna Tracking and Verification Systems, Japan's reporting requirements (including area of capture) for all imports or transportation of tunas into Japan by boat, and the EU's labelling of all fish products (including area of capture).

=== Marine Stewardship Council ===
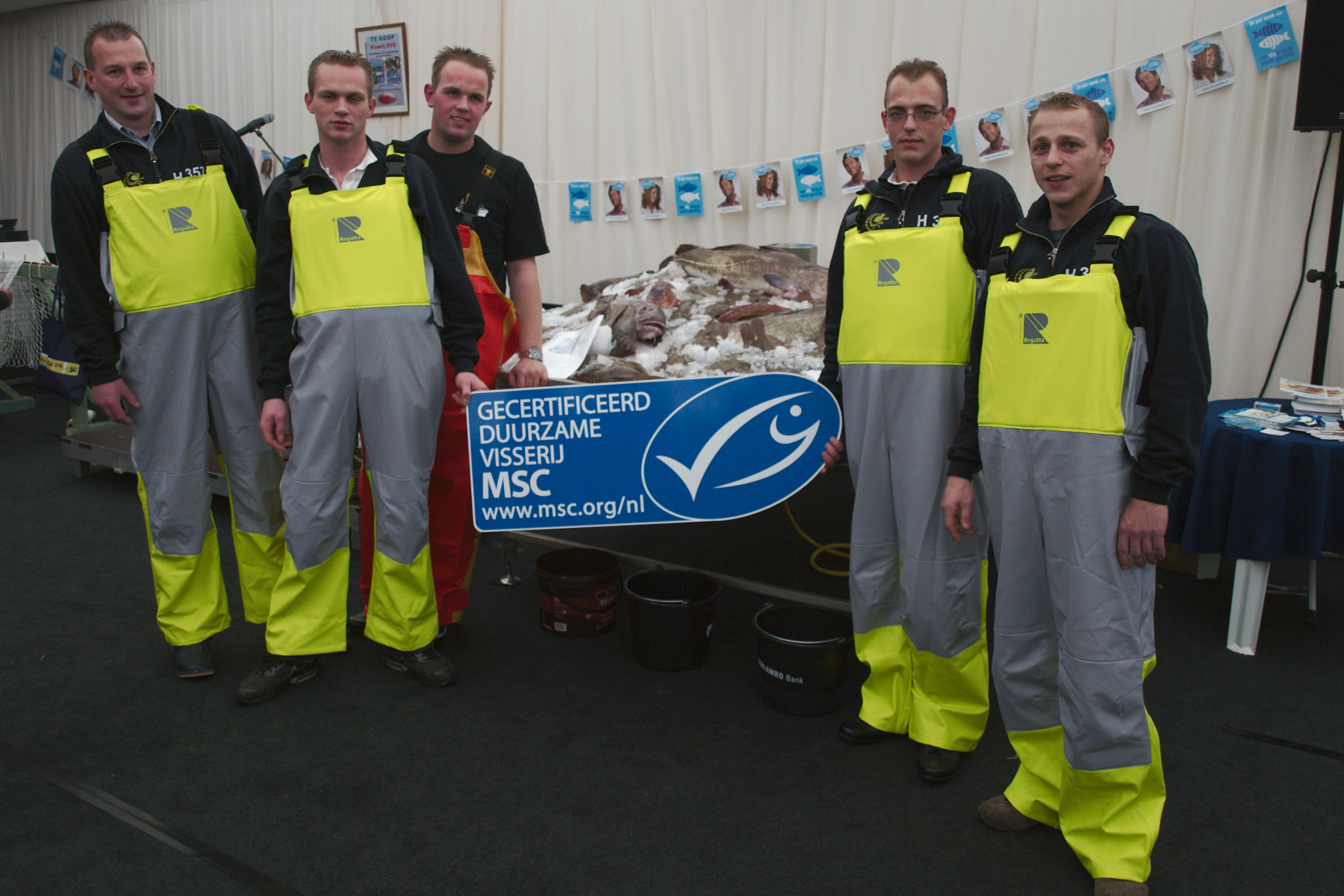
Osprey Crew posing with Marine Stewardship Council (MSC) logo in front of recently caught fish

The Marine Stewardship Council (MSC) is an international non-profit organization that runs a certification and ecolabelling program for traceable, sustainable seafood.

To achieve certification as sustainable, a fishery must meet a standard based on three principles: ensuring healthy fish stocks, minimal impact on the marine ecosystem, and effective management (which includes ensuring the fishery operates within national and international laws). Fisheries that meet the MSC standard for a sustainable fishery can use the blue MSC ecolabel on their seafood products.

The second element of the program is a certification for seafood traceability. This is called MSC Chain of Custody. From the fishery, every company in the supply chain that handles the certified fish is checked to ensure the MSC label is only applied to fish products that come from a certified fishery. This requires effective record-keeping and storage procedures. This traceability element of the program helps to keep illegally fished seafood out of the supply chain by linking seafood sold in shops and restaurants to a certified sustainable fishery.

The MSC eco-label enables consumers to identify sustainable seafood when shopping or dining out. As of June 2014, there are over 14,000 MSC-labelled seafood products sold in over 90 countries around the world. The MSC website lists outlets selling MSC-certified seafood.

The six MSC-certified Patagonian toothfish and Antarctic toothfish fisheries (which are the South Georgia, Ross Sea, Heard Island, Macquarie Island, Kerguelen Islands and Falkland Islands fisheries) provide an example of how good fisheries management can reverse the trend of illegal fishing. These fisheries took, among others, the following steps to exclude illegal vessels from their waters:

- strict vessel licensing systems are rigorously enforced,
- each vessel must have at least 1 CCAMLR approved Government observer on board its vessel to verify catch data,
- each vessel must have port-to-port monitoring of its movements via two tamper-proof Vessel Monitoring System (VMS) units on board,
- all toothfish product that is transported must be accompanied by a CCAMLR Dissostichus Catch Document (DCD), with details of where and when that fish was caught

==== Responsible Fishing Vessel Standard (RFVS) ====
The Responsible Fishing Vessel Standard is a UK based, vessel certification scheme launched in 2016 by Seafish (formally the Sea Fish Industry Authority) an executive non-departmental public body, sponsored by the UK's Department for Environment, Food & Rural Affairs. The scheme recognizes fishing vessels that demonstrate best practice in fishing operations and crew welfare.

Seafish offers regulatory guidance and services to all parts of the seafood industry in the UK, including catching and aquaculture, processors, importers, exporters and distributors of seafood, as well as restaurants and retailers. Seafish is funded by a levy on the first sale of seafood landed in the UK. Its services are intended to support and improve the environmental sustainability, efficiency and cost-effectiveness of the industry, as well as promoting responsibly-sourced seafood.

== Enforcement ==
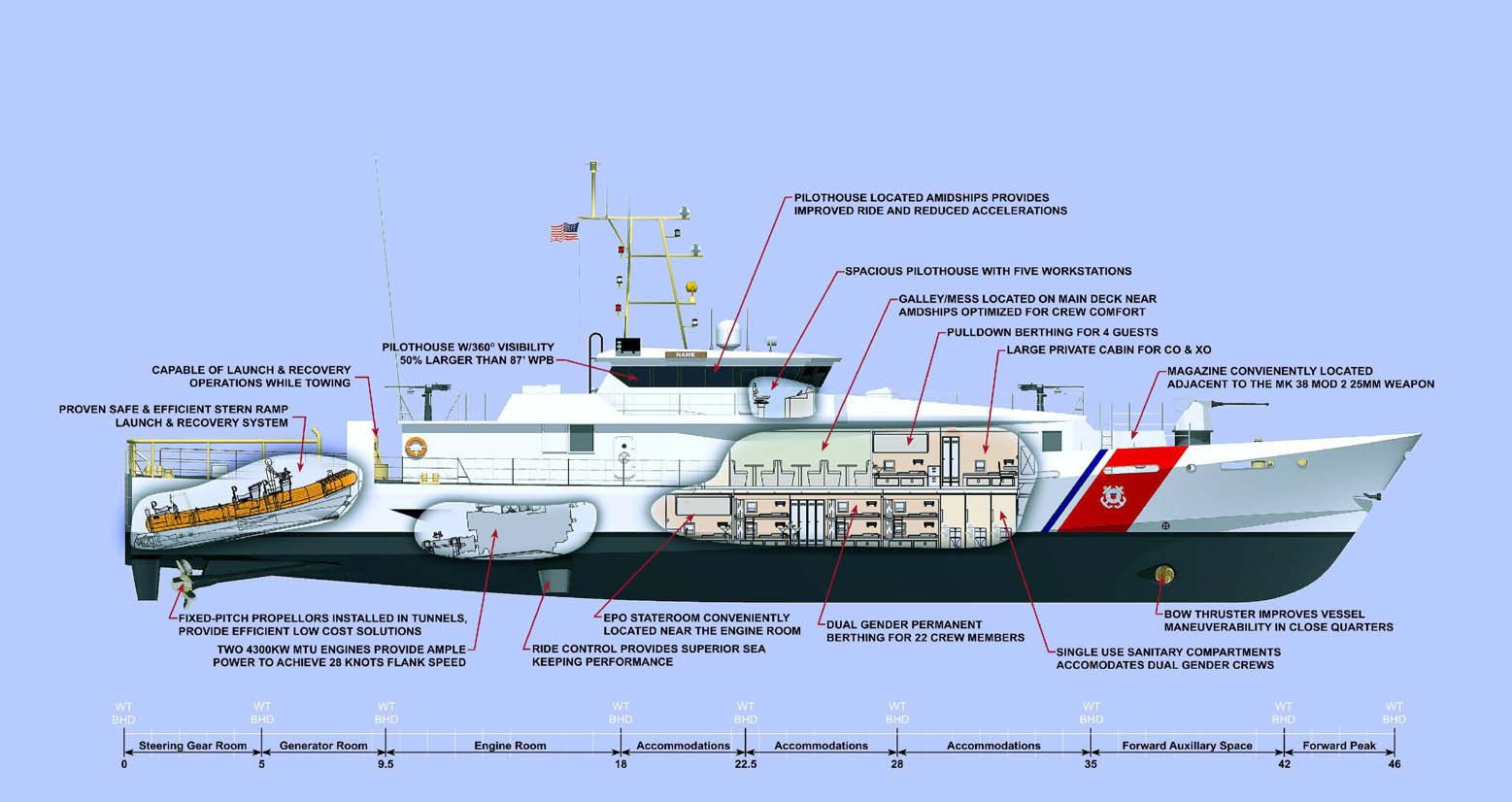
Design for an environmental protection patrol vessel

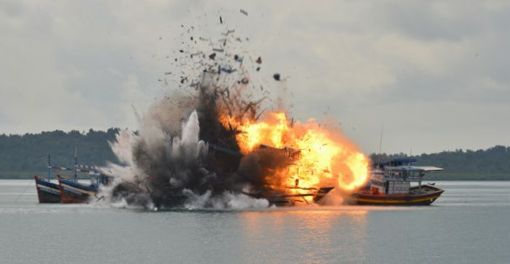
Illegal fishing ship in Indonesia forcibly sunk.

Illegal and unreported fishing (two of the three components of IUU fishing) essentially arise from a failure to adequately enforce existing national and international laws. There are, however, many factors underlying enforcement failure, including, notably, poor levels of national governance.

There are obvious problems with enforcing fisheries regulations on the high seas, including locating and apprehending the pirate ships, but solutions are available, chiefly through improved monitoring and surveillance systems.

Many fishermen are getting away with IUU ocean fishing due to the difficulty of monitoring every fishing boat. This may change with new technology to watch and follow each boat from space through radio beacons, which all boats in the ocean are required to have. Implementing this new monitoring system may make it more difficult for fishermen to get away with IUU fishing in the future. MSC systems are similarly of value within exclusive economic zones, including, for example, offshore patrols and licensing schemes.

The aggressive efforts of the Indonesian government to curtail illegal fishing has "reduced total fishing effort by at least 25%, ... [potentially] generate a 14% increase in catch and a 12% increase in profit." Therefore, the authors concluded that "many nations can recover their fisheries while avoiding these short-term costs by sharply addressing illegal, unreported and unregulated (IUU) fishing."

In December 2022, the United States Secretary of the Treasury issued sanctions on Pingtan Marine Enterprise and related individuals over human rights abuses tied to China-based illegal fishing.

Brazil has reduced IUU by implementing the National Program for Tracking Fishing Vessels by Satellite (PREPS). This Vessel Monitoring System (VMS) was intended to serve as a spatial fleet management tool to promote orderly fishing practices. However there is still some scrutiny around the effectiveness of such enforcement: many vessels remain untracked or falsify AIS data, and as Nunes et al. note, "PREPS... does not effectively cover all fishing vessels, particularly those not officially registered or those using AIS transponders improperly".

While binding international instruments such as UNCLOS, the Port State Measures Agreement (PSMA), and the FAO Code of Conduct exist, scholars have critiqued their enforcement in weak governance contexts. Technological means such as satellite-based AIS and VMS systems and DNA forensics, and blockchain may improve surveillance and supply chain transparency, although false positives, data manipulation, and surveillance fatigue reduce their effectiveness, especially where data-sharing protocols are weak or voluntary.

Websites such as TMT's (Trygg Mat Tracking) and the Combined IUU Vessel List maintain information on fishing and related vessels that appear on the illegal, unregulated and unreported (IUU) fishing vessel lists published by Regional Fisheries Management Organisations (RFMOs) and other related organisations.

== Flag state liability ==
Under the United Nations Convention on the Law of the Sea, states bear responsibility for the vessels (including fishing vessels) that fly their flag. While it is uncontroversial that individuals engaged in IUU fishing may be subject to legal sanctions, the extent to which flag states may be held liable under international law for the IUU fishing activities of their vessels is less clearly defined.

In March 2013 the issue of flag state liability for IUU fishing was brought before the International Tribunal for the Law of the Sea in a request for an advisory opinion submitted by the Sub-Regional Fisheries Commission (SRFC) of West Africa. The SRFC asked the Tribunal to advise on the following four questions:

1. What are the obligations of the flag State in cases where illegal, unreported and unregulated (IUU) fishing activities are conducted within the Exclusive Economic Zone of third party States?
2. To what extent shall the flag State be held liable for IUU fishing activities conducted by vessels sailing under its flag?
3. Where a fishing license is issued to a vessel within the framework of an international agreement with the flag State or with an international agency, shall the State or international agency be held liable for the violation of the fisheries legislation of the coastal State by the vessel in question?
4. What are the rights and obligations of the coastal State in ensuring the sustainable management of shared stocks and stocks of common interest, especially the small pelagic species and tuna?

In its submissions to the Tribunal, the SRFC emphasized the severity of the IUU fishing problem in West Africa and the need for a clear regime of flag state responsibilities with respect to vessels engaged in this trade. The SRFC argued that its member states had been unable to mount successful prosecutions against IUU fishers following boardings due to a lack of support and cooperation from flag states.

A number of states and international organizations also made submissions adopting a range positions with respect to the four questions above. It was held by some states that the Tribunal lacked the advisory jurisdiction to respond to these questions. Both the government of Spain, a major contributor to the problem of IUU fishing, as well as the United Kingdom adopted such a view. A number of other states took the position that flag state responsibility for IUU fishing should take the form of a general responsibility to perform due diligence with respect to vessels and their activities, rather than an obligation to assist in prosecutions or another more substantive requirement.

In its Advisory Opinion issued on 2 April 2015, the Tribunal adopted the "due diligence" approach. The Tribunal found that flag states are under only a general obligation to take the necessary measures to ensure that their nationals and vessels flying their flag are not engaged in IUU fishing activities. This obligation may be satisfied by adhering to generally accepted international norms of fishing vessel regulation and complying with international treaties that indicate best practices. At the same time, the Tribunal found that in coastal waters the coastal state bears primary responsibility for preventing IUU fishing and not the flag state.

== Political processes ==
=== EU action plan ===
The EU helped draw up FAO's international plan of action to prevent, deter and eliminate IUU fishing, endorsed by the FAO Council in June 2001. The EU then developed its own plan to implement the commitments agreed at international level, and the European Commission's action plan for the eradication of IUU fishing was published in May 2002. It is intended to be implemented at four levels:

At the EU level, more responsibility will be requested with regard to member state nationals acting under a flag of convenience. Moreover, market measures concerning fisheries products caught in violation of the international agreements will be adopted. In addition, information actions addressed to the fishing industry, consumers, and the public will be launched to raise their awareness.

In the framework of Regional Fisheries Management Organisations, control and inspection plans would be adopted as well as specific conservation and management measures. In addition IUU vessels would be identified and monitored and their catches would be quantified.

At the international level, concepts like genuine link would be defined, and a number of rights and obligations of the port state would be established. Moreover, the exchange of information on IUU activities and the international co-operation would be strengthened.

In partnership with developing countries, the necessary means would be provided to enable them to effectively control fishing activities undertaken in waters under their jurisdiction.

European Commission sanctions against states operating open ship registries and flags of convenience for illegal, unreported and unregulated fishing have been effective in pressuring states to reform or limit their open ship registries to fishing vessels, or at least in severely curtailing registrations under that jurisdiction. These sanctions generally limit or ban access to the European Common Market for fisheries products produced by vessels of a certain state.

=== High Seas Task Force ===
The High Seas Task Force comprises a group of fisheries ministers and international NGOs working together to develop an action plan designed to combat IUU fishing on the high seas.

Launched in 2003, the Task Force includes fisheries ministers from Australia, Canada, Chile, Namibia, New Zealand and the UK, together with the Earth Institute, IUCN-World Conservation Union, WWF International and the Marine Stewardship Council.

The goal of the Task Force is to set priorities among a series of practical proposals for confronting the challenge of IUU fishing on the high seas. A series of expert panels have been convened to identify the legal, economic, scientific and enforcement factors that permit IUU activity to thrive, and then determine key points of leverage that can brought to bear at national, regional, and global levels to minimise the incentives to carry out IUU fishing on the high seas. The completed action plan, published on 3 March 2006, will be placed by ministerial members of the Task Force directly in the hands of other ministers.

=== Regional Fisheries Management Organizations ===
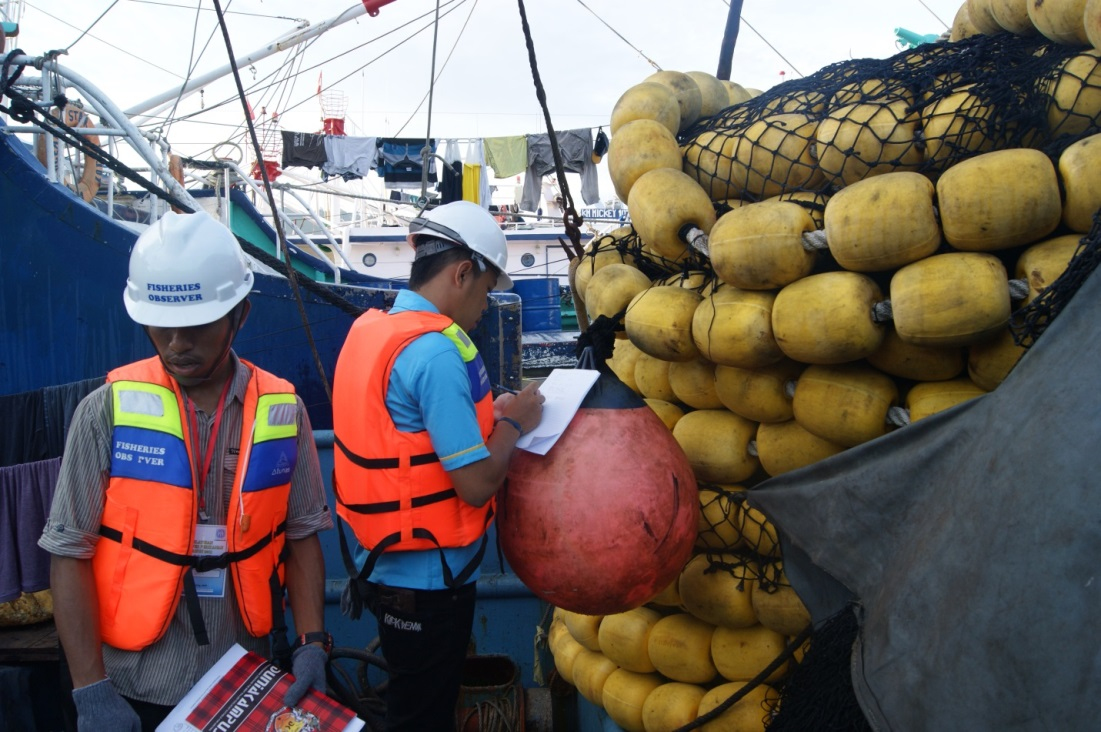
Trained Indonesian Observers check a vessel to meet obligations from Regional Fisheries Management Organizations (RFMO's)

Regional Fisheries Management Organisations (RFMOs) are affiliations of nations that co-ordinate efforts to manage fisheries in a particular region.

RFMOs may focus on certain species of fish (e.g. the Commission for the Conservation of Southern bluefin tuna) or have a wider remit related to living marine resources in general within a region (e.g. the Commission for the Conservation of Antarctic Marine Living Resources (CCAMLR)). This wide diversity of mandates and areas of application, and also effective implementation of regulations, opens up opportunities for IUU vessels.

=== UN high seas processes ===
The present system of high seas governance has evolved over a period of several hundred years, the result being a patchwork quilt of measures in the form of binding and non-binding instruments with different geographical and legal reaches and different levels of participation.

Most legal instruments build on the foundation established by the UN Convention on the Law of the Sea, which was agreed in 1982 and entered into force in 1992.

The UN Fish Stocks Agreement, which entered into force in 2001, sets out principles for the conservation and management of fish stocks and establishes that such management must be based on the precautionary approach and the best available scientific information. The Agreement provides a framework for cooperation on conservation and management, but since only about a third of the parties to the Law of the Sea Convention have ratified it, its impact is inevitably limited.

The UN Food and Agriculture Organisation (FAO) carries out much of the technical work on international fisheries management, and provides a forum for the negotiation of agreements and codes of conduct. In 1995 the FAO agreed its Code of Conduct for Responsible Fisheries to promote long-term sustainable management.

In 2001, the FAO adopted the International Plan of Action (IPOA) on IUU Fishing. The aim of this voluntary instrument is to prevent, deter and eliminate IUU fishing by providing all states with comprehensive, effective and transparent measures by which to act, including through appropriate regional fisheries management organisations established in accordance with international law.

The FAO Compliance Agreement, which entered into force in 2003, is designed to close a major loophole in international fisheries management, that of the circumvention of fisheries regulations by 're-flagging' vessels under the flags of states that are unable or unwilling to enforce such measures.

In 2009, the FAO brokered the Agreement on Port State Measures to Prevent, Deter and Eliminate Illegal, Unreported and Unregulated Fishing, which entered into force in 2016. The agreement closes ports to vessels suspected of illegal fishing. The treaty requires that fishing vessels request permission to dock and inform the port of the details of its fishing operations. Permission to dock can be denied if unregulated fishing was occurring. The measure is intended to block illegally caught fish from entering the marketplace. Other measures in the treaty include inspections of equipment, paperwork, catches, and ship's records. Though the treaty does not compel countries to apply these measures to ships under their own flags, they may choose to do so under the agreement.

Commitments made by the FAO have seen an increase in international participation in anti IUU fishing practices. The UN Committee On Fisheries produced a report concerning the status of anti IUU fishing strategies implemented by UN member states during the 34th COFI conference. Additions to the COFI plan include the creation of a Global Record of Fishing beginning in 2017. COFI recommends that each vessel's Unique Vessel Identifier (UVI) number be uploaded to the registry. Of the various member states, the COFI report recognizes that the utilization of the record is not yet prevalent in Asia, while European, North American, and Latin American nations have added the most vessels to the record. Further recommendations by COFI mandate that the FAO continue to provide support to fisheries pursuing subsidies from the World Trade Organization. The committee also called for the establishment of on transshipment, targeted to combat the practice of transferring illegal catch between vessels, making it more difficult to track illegal fishing operations. COFI developed a series of Voluntary Guidelines for Catch Documentation Schemes (VGCDS) in 2017 in order to prevent the sale of products suspected of being attained through IUU fishing. COFI has facilitated two international workshops to assist in the implementation of these guidelines. Annexes 1-3 of the report detail the recommendations that each member state has taken to measure international progress. The 34th UN Committee on Fisheries (COFI) report on Illegal, unreported and unregistered fishing concluded that further study must be conducted on the impact of IUU fishing. The report recommended the creation of a series of volumes including previous estimates of IUU impact and a set of best practices for fielding further study.

=== Global goals ===
The Sustainable Development Goal 14 has a target to reduce illegal, unreported and unregulated fishing as follows: "By 2020, effectively regulate harvesting and end overfishing, illegal, unreported and unregulated fishing and destructive fishing practices and implement science-based management plans, in order to restore fish stocks in the shortest time feasible, at least to levels that can produce maximum sustainable yield as determined by their biological characteristics." This target has one indicator: Indicator 14.4.1 is "the proportion of fish stocks within biologically sustainable levels". This indicator aims to measure the proportion of global fish stocks which are "overexploited", "fully exploited" and "not fully exploited". A report at the High-level Political Forum on Sustainable Development in 2021 stated that: "Sustainable fisheries accounted for approximately 0.1 per cent of global GDP in 2017".

== IUU fishing in the Mediterranean Sea ==
The Mediterranean Sea has substantial illegal fishing activities that threaten sustainable fishing in the region. To raise awareness of the seriousness of the issue, the General Fisheries Commission for the Mediterranean (GFCM) proposed June 5 as the international day in the fight against IUU fishing. The GFCM of the FAO (Food and Agriculture Organization) has a position of prominence in dealing with IUU fishing in the Mediterranean Sea.

According to data collected in Italy, Morocco and Turkey, among the most heavily damaged species are albacore, red mullet, sea bream, little tunny, sparid fish, shrimps, octopus, swordfish, mullet. In July 2020 the WWF announced that the illegal fishing of several species of sharks and rays in the Mediterranean has put their survival in serious danger.

The GFCM aims to develop an international surveillance system involving the collaboration of actors in the Mediterranean to guarantee adherence to fisheries rules. Among the measures taken under the GFCM are frequent inspections carried out by the European Fisheries Control Agency (EFCA) with the support of Algeria, Albania, Bosnia and Herzegovina, Montenegro, Libya and Tunisia. In 2004 the GFCM worked together with the FAO in a first workshop concerning the issue of IUU fishing in the Mediterranean, proposing a clarification of positive and negative vessels as a first step in the fight against criminals.

Despite the efforts of the GFCM and the FAO still remains a general lack of political will in addressing the issue. Fisheries management in the Mediterranean has harmonization problems in a heterogeneous political framework. Croatia, Cyprus, France, Greece, Malta, Italy, Slovenia, and Spain are EU member states and must adapt to European policies. Since 2010 the EU has imposed to its members to import in the markets only from legal sources. Other Mediterranean countries follow their own regulations. All of them remain under the authority of the GFCM, as the organization that can address IUU fishing in the Mediterranean as a whole. In 2006 the EU established a ban on trawling under the European Regulation on Mediterranean fishing in those Natura 2000 areas dedicated to the protection of habitats threatened by bottom fishing, such as seagrass beds and coralligenous habitats. However still today the sites are not fully protected, and the ban is not properly implemented in the Mediterranean.

Since January 2010 came into force the EU Regulation to prevent and deter IUU fishing, followed by the 2014 Common Fisheries Policy for a sustainable fishing and aquaculture, but these measures have failed in their purpose, allowing illegal activities to continue. The international advocacy organization Oceana was able to locate illegal bottom trawlers in the Fisheries Restricted Areas (FRAs) accepted by all Mediterranean countries for the protection of specific marine species. The majority of the criminal actions took place in the Sicily Channel where all activities in the seabed are forbidden to not endanger the hake population, already heavily overfished. Oceana reported to the European Commission that many Italian trawlers did not comply with the obligations reserved to the protected areas.

The latest mechanism in the struggle against illegal, unreported and unregulated fishing activities dates to September 2023. It is an e-learning platform called e-FishMed and its objective is to effectively train personnel for fisheries control in the Mediterranean and East Atlantic areas, through e-learning material, video tutorials, manuals and national and regional legislative systems. This project is funded by the European Union and supported by the EFCA. It represents an attempt to harmonize the control of fishing activities among Mediterranean countries, thus fostering greater collaboration for a sustainable blue economy.

== Fisheries crime ==
Fisheries crime is a concept related to Illegal, unreported and unregulated fishing (IUU) but includes all criminal activity that is common along the entire value chain of the fishing sector. The concept has been adopted in several international organizations, most importantly the United Nations Office on Drugs and Crime (UNODC). Proponents of the concept argue for increased international cooperation and the application of criminal justice sanction towards fisheries crime to face the problems that the transnational nature and the increased involvement of organized crime groups in the fishing industry cause.

Common crimes along the fishing value chain include fraud, corruption, tax crime, money laundering, human trafficking, labour crime, and smuggling of drugs weapons and other cargo such as fuel.

=== IUU as a transnational organized crime ===
The above named fisheries crimes are also defined as transnational organized crimes (TOC) which are prosecuted more vigorously, and harsher penalties are imposed for violations. Generally, IUU is deeply connected to other forms of TOCs such as human and drug trafficking, corruption and document fraud, to name a few. Nonetheless, it is not treated the same as these other TOCs. Human trafficking and firearms trafficking for example have special provisions given by the United Nations Convention against Transnational Organized Crime (UNCTOC) but the same does not exist for IUU due to the lack of definition as a transnational organized crime.

A study revealed a close connection between IUU and fisheries crime, emphasizing the need for law enforcement to treat IUU as seriously as other transnational organized crimes in order to effectively address the issue globally and bring about meaningful change. This connection was also pointed out by the UN General Assembly in 2008 that urged all members to take the close ties between IUU and other criminal activities serious and to deepen the knowledge in this area. In general, IUU is executed by a wide range of people involved. In addition to organized criminal groups, there are also legally operating fishermen who went corrupt for the profits since IUU makes legal and sustainable fishing less beneficial. Tackling IUU violations more harshly will thus also reduce other TOCs since it also acts as a root cause for many of these. Generally, in comparison to other organized crimes, IUU presents unique challenges as it frequently intersects with legal fishing activities, making it more difficult to distinguish between legitimate and illicit practices than in cases such as drug or human trafficking.

=== Human trafficking ===
Human trafficking within the IUU fishing sector is emerging as an increasingly serious issue. It involves the use of force, coercion or misinformation in the recruitment of persons, with the aim of labour exploitation in relation to illegal, unregulated and unreported fishing operations. This often involves the exploitation of vulnerable individuals including migrant workers and those living in poverty due to their lack of legal protections and vulnerability to exploitative labour practice as a result of economic hardships and a lack of identity documents. Forced labour in relation to IUU fishing has significant physical and psychological consequences. Exposure to physical violence, threats of violence as well as lack of adequate living conditions and food and water are among some of the frequent human rights abuses that occur on these vessels. The illicit nature of these activities mean there is a lack of clear information on the numbers of human trafficking incidents on board IUU vessels, making it difficult to understand the true extent of the issue.

It is significantly more difficult and costly to police illegal actives at sea than on land and with the added complication of territorial disagreements between countries at sea, it can be easy for IUU vessels to evade law enforcement, making the issue one that is difficult to tackle. Fishing in the high seas further aids vessels in going under the radar due to the remote environment and lack of centralised enforcement authority. The high seas are also more challenging to regulate and monitor than EEZs, making it much easier for human trafficking vessels to operate.

Flags of convenience can further aid human trafficking on board IUU vessels. While not illegal itself, flying another nation's flag can help ships avoid accountability for illegal activities and human rights abuses and evade local labour and human rights laws.

Population increase and food insecurity, particularly in developing countries, has overseen an increased demand for fish, which has increased competition in the fishing industry and led to an increase in illegal fishing as a means to maximise profits. This increased demand has led to a surge in fishing in the high seas, where there are more fish to meed these demands than in coastal waters and exclusive economic zones.

Human trafficking on board IUU vessels is linked with economic underdevelopment and political instability. In the Gulf of Guinea there was a surge in trafficking and smuggling prompted by a decline in economic activity and a succession of intrastate conflicts. These factors can lead to increased poverty and unemployment which can push vulnerable people towards exploitative work. Intrastate conflict often leads to a breakdown in the rule of law and creates an environment where traffickers can thrive. A significant portion of human trafficking in the Gulf of Guinea is enabled by the corruption of high-ranking officials, including but not limited to, diplomats and politicians. These factors can explain why countries with developing economies often have higher rates of human trafficking.

IUU fishing is sustained by systemic vulnerabilities in vessel registration systems, port inspections, and legal frameworks across 14 West African states. There are different complex modi operandi issues including surveillance avoidance, fraudulent licensing, and transhipment at sea, often linked to other crimes such as corruption, customs fraud, human trafficking, and maritime piracy as noted previously. Therefore there is a pressing need for interdisciplinary research and enforcement, which addresses how institutional fragility manifested through corruption, limited governance and weak legal framework creates fertile ground for transnational criminal networks.

In Latin America, countries such as Brazil and Argentina, both key actors in the Atlantic fishing industry, face significant challenges where illegal, unreported, and unregulated (IUU) fishing intersects with human trafficking and forced labor. In Brazil, the extensive coastline and relatively weak enforcement have allowed fishing vessels involved in IUU activities to exploit migrant and local fishers, many of whom work under abusive and coercive conditions Similarly, in Argentina, reports have highlighted cases where distant-water fishing fleets operating near national Exclusive Economic Zones (EEZs) engage in labor exploitation, including forced labor, as a hidden dimension of illegal fishing operations. These vulnerabilities are compounded by limited maritime surveillance and governance gaps, which criminal networks exploit to traffic workers and evade detection. This nexus between IUU fishing and human trafficking undermines efforts toward sustainable fisheries management and violates human rights, creating serious social and economic consequences for coastal communities in the Atlantic basin.

== Gendered impacts ==
Women are disproportionately affected by IUU fishing because they are heavily represented in post-harvest fisheries activities, including processing, smoking, drying, sorting, and marketing fish. The Food and Agriculture Organization (FAO) notes that women comprise up to 50 percent of the global fisheries workforce, particularly in secondary and value-chain activities, yet their contributions are frequently under-recorded in fisheries statistics and policy processes.

A 2025 review of 189 studies on gender, climate change, and IUU fishing found that women in small-scale fisheries are disproportionately affected by declining fish stocks, exclusion from decision-making, and restricted access to resources, which together reduce adaptive capacity and increase economic insecurity. Women in some fishing communities in the Global South also face more limited access to finance, technology, transport, and higher-value markets than men due to taboos and local practices. The review argues that gender-responsive fisheries governance can improve resilience in communities affected by IUU fishing.

Researchers have also documented links between fish scarcity and exploitative transactional relationships affecting women fish traders. In parts of sub-Saharan Africa, transactional relationships commonly referred to as “fish-for-sex” have been associated with competition over limited fish supplies, unequal bargaining power between male fishers and female traders, and increased risks of sexual exploitation and HIV infection. The FAO has identified fish-for-sex practices as a gender-related vulnerability that can emerge where women have weak access to fisheries resources and markets, and international fisheries policy frameworks have increasingly emphasized women’s participation in fisheries governance and gender equality as components of sustainable small-scale fisheries management.

Legal scholars have further argued that women remain insufficiently protected within international and national responses to IUU fishing, despite their significant roles in fisheries value chains and their exposure to labour exploitation, trafficking, and other forms of abuses associated with fisheries crime within IUU fishing. International fisheries policy frameworks, including the FAO Voluntary Guidelines for Securing Sustainable Small-Scale Fisheries, increasingly emphasize gender equality and women’s participation in fisheries governance as components of efforts to combat IUU fishing and strengthen coastal livelihoods.

Research also notes that while women are disproportionally affected by IUU fishing there is cautions against portraying women solely as victims of IUU fishing, as this may obscure their agency. Women have also been documented as participants in illicit fishing and related maritime offences although studies suggest that their involvement occurs on a substantially smaller scale than that of men.

Men are also affected by IUU fishing but their vulnerability may be shaped more strongly by socioeconomic status than by gender alone as explained in the Human Trafficking section on Fisheries Crime earlier.

== See also ==
- Environmental effects of fishing
- Fishing industry in Taiwan
- Fisheries management
- Fisheries law
- Game law
- Game warden
- Geoff Regan
- List of environmental issues
- The Outlaw Ocean
- Overfishing
- Poaching
- Pacific-class patrol boat
- Seafood Choices Alliance
- Vessel monitoring system
