= HIV/AIDS in Kenya =

Kenya has a severe, generalized HIV epidemic – currently the 7th highest globally – with an HIV prevalence of 4.3% amongst adults aged 15 - 49 in 2023 and approximately 18,000 related adult deaths that year.

However, since the 2000s, the country has experienced a notable decline in HIV prevalence, attributed in part to significant behavioral change and increased access to ARV (antiretroviral drugs, also known as antiretroviral treatment/ART). Adult HIV prevalence is estimated to have fallen from 10% in the late 1990s to as low as 3.2% in 2023. From 2010 to 2023, Kenya decreased its annual new HIV infections by 75%, and is on track to reach the target of reducing new HIV infections by 90% by 2030 in accordance with UNAIDS goals.

Women face a considerably higher risk of HIV infection than men, but have longer life expectancies than men when on ART. UNAIDS Data 2024 reports adult women are at a higher risk of HIV infections than adult men. Populations in Kenya that are especially at risk include sex workers, men who have sex with men (MSM), people who inject drugs (PWID), transgender individuals and prisoners. Other groups also include discordant couples (where one partner is infected and the other is not) however successful ARV-treatment will prevent transmission. Other groups at risk are prison communities, uniformed forces, and truck drivers.

== History ==
The HIV/AIDS epidemic in Kenya began in 1984, when the first case of HIV was found.

By 1985, sex workers were involved in 26 new recorded cases of HIV, but their condition remained a mystery, with a mass denial of it being a problem throughout 1986. In 1987, a study was performed on the unique women from the Majengo slum in Nairobi, who were "immune" to AIDS. By 1988, HIV had reached 3,000 reported cases, with prevalence rising to 2.5% of the population in 1990 while the government remained in denial of the health issue.

By 1995, the death toll had reached about 200,000 people. In 1998, the prevalence rate was 9.8%, which eventually decreased to 6.7% in 2003 as the public sector released low-cost antiretroviral medications. In 2005, around 65,000 HIV positive individuals in Kenya were on ART/ARVs. By 2012, prevalence had dropped to 5.6%, but Kenya still had the 4th largest HIV epidemic. In 2016, NASCOP revised guidelines on HIV prevention and treatment, incorporating PrEP into reduction strategies, and Kenya's HIV prevalence continued to drop, with recent 2022 - 2024 efforts to stop new infections.

== Overview of the HIV epidemic ==
Here is a brief overview of the HIV epidemic in the country as reported by the UNAIDS report on Kenya for 2023.

- 1,400,000 living with HIV
- 75,000 children
- 17,000 Kenyans were newly infected with HIV In 2023.
- 3,800 children, 9,100 women, and 4,100 men were infected with HIV in 2023.
- 21,000 AIDS-related deaths occurred in 2023.
- 2,700 children, 9,500 women, and 8,700 men died from AIDS-related causes in 2023.

| County | HIV Prevalence (%) |
|---|---|
| Homa Bay | 25.7 |
| Siaya | 23.7 |
| Kisumu | 19.3 |
| Migori | 14.7 |
| Kisii | 8 |
| Turkana | 7.6 |
| Nairobi | 6.8 |
| Busia | 6.8 |
| Nyamira | 6.4 |

== Social outlook ==
=== LGBTQ+ ===
As the LGBTQ+ community has always been part of the fight against HIV/AIDS in all countries, the same has happened in Kenya. Although MSMs and other forms of same-sex contact are not the main risk group or cause of HIV/AIDS in Kenya, they have been a big proponent due to the laws that have been put in place by the country's government. Homosexuality is currently illegal in Kenya, allowing the government to 595 cases of homosexuality from 2010 to 2014. While MSMs and members of the LGBTQ+ community already face discrimination on a regular basis, they are being denied treatment due to their identity and the penal code in many places in Kenya.

However, in 2016, activist groups have been able to challenge the constitutionality of the laws that are in place, resulting in the government contemplating if they should be repealed. The verdict is currently undecided. Victory has been won in other places that had laws that discriminated against the LGBTQ+ community, so activists have a positive outlook at this point in time.

=== Adolescents ===
With adolescents being a big risk group in Kenya, society has molded the outlook of this group and how they interact with HIV/AIDS. There are many social stigmas involved with people aged 15–19, as they go through harsh environments in schools and in the community. HIV and AIDS in school is viewed as a killer disease that is a sign of sexual immorality. Many adolescents feel afraid to disclose their status, due to the stigma that is behind it. Fear is also found in walking into health centers and asking about HIV/AIDS, due to the conception that health workers will look down on you and your condition.

Social media has also provided adolescents in Kenya with illegitimate information about the disease, prevention of the disease, and overall outlook. While the main fear is found in public shaming or judging, another problem is that adolescents are not represented in policy very well, compared to that of children and adults. Economic burdens that are placed on adolescents that do not have parents to provide the means for their education and wellbeing is another problem for the group. Sometimes, adolescents are forced into being sex workers to provide for themselves, resulting in an increased risk for HIV infection.

=== Sex work ===
Sex workers have the highest prevalence among the risk groups of HIV/AIDS in Kenya. It has been reported that 29.3% of sex workers have HIV. The main problem within this community is the fear of coming forward about being raped or abused, because it could lead to prosecution for being a prostitute. Therefore, sex workers are less likely to go to anyone for help because of this fear. Being prosecuted and arrested can lead to an interruption in HIV treatment.

== Current status ==
The Kenyan Ministry of Health published a report in June 2014 called Kenya HIV Prevention Revolution Road Map. The road map aims to dramatically strengthen HIV prevention, with the ultimate goal of reducing new HIV infections to zero by 2030. The following observations and conclusions were outlined:

- Sexual transmission accounts for 93.7% of all new HIV infections (MOT, 2008).
- The HIV epidemic in Kenya exhibits extreme geographical and gender disparities. National estimates and modelling indicate that 65% of new adult infections occur in nine of the 47 Counties. There is higher prevalence among women at 7.6% compared to men at 5.6%. There is a treatment gap of over 99,500 women and 64,900 men, in need of ART but not currently receiving treatment. ART coverage is 77% in eligible women compared to 80% in men.
- Key populations contribute a disproportionately high number of new HIV infections annually despite their small population size. According to the MOT 2008, although these populations represent less than 2% of the general population, they contribute a third of all new HIV infections. Key populations in Kenya include sex workers, men who have sex with men (MSM) and people who inject drugs. Additionally, there are geographical disparities in the distribution of key populations across the Counties.
- A recent development in April 2018 shows Kenya receiving funding from the Children's investment Fund Foundation to buy ARVs for children in the country. The country received 400 million Kenyan shillings after the 38 billion shillings was not enough to cover all the risk groups involved in the epidemic. While the grant for 38 billion shillings was given by the Global Fund to cover a broad spectrum of diseases including tuberculosis and malaria, the new grant has been given specifically for treatment of children with HIV. This is due to the fact that about 120,000 children, ages of fourteen and under, are living with HIV. As of 2012, Kenya has received about 100 billion shillings in funding over the span of 19 grants given by various organizations.
- As of September 2018, adolescents are a high risk group in Kenya to be infected by HIV. Nearly 106,000 adolescents, aging from 15 to 19, are living with HIV. This trend is on the rise due to the stigmatization of HIV/AIDS within adolescent communities and society.

== Cost ==
=== Low Cost Antiretroviral Drugs ===
ART was introduced to Kenya in the late 90s when the treatment was initially being rolled out. However, they did not start receiving low cost drugs until around 2003. Costs continued to decline, and with enough donor money, more than a million patients receive ART for free through the government. Recently, Kenyans with HIV got access to a high end drug for cheap due to an international deal. The cost per year for this drug treatment is US$75 and is a big improvement as it combines some drugs together to make the treatment plan cheaper and easier for patients living with HIV. This drug has been accessible in high income countries since 2014, but the new deal has placed the drug in middle and low income countries.

== Response ==
During the initial outbreak of AIDS in the 80s, the Kenyan government stayed away from discussions about how big of a problem there was with HIV/AIDS in the country. By 1993, statements were finally made about the problem and how the situation should have been addressed sooner. The response and plan to reduce the amount of HIV infections has been more extensive going into the new century and currently.

The Joint United Nations Program on HIV/AIDS, Kenya HIV Prevention Revolution and Kenya AIDS Strategic Framework in collaboration with the Ministry of Health, strategized to reduce infections to zero by 2030.

=== HTC ===
HIV testing and counseling (HTC) has been one response to the HIV/AIDS crisis in Kenya. The government has encouraged getting tested and for people to be more open about the diagnosis so it can be addressed appropriately. Self testing kits for low cost have been introduced over recent years, along with community based testing and door-to-door campaigns. In 2008, only 860,000 people were being annually tested for HIV, compared to 9.9 million people that are being tested annually now.

=== PrEP: Pre-Exposure Prophylaxis ===
In 2016 NASCOP (National AIDS and STI Control Program) incorporated PrEP into the national HIV reduction strategy. The guidelines recommended tenofovir/emcitirabine (TDF/FTC) for HIV prevention targeted towards key populations including sex workers, MSM, PWID and sero-discordant couples. PrEP has been found to be 99% effective at reducing HIV infections from sexual intercousre when taken as prescribed. Stigma, facilitated by low PrEP awareness, and prejudice around gender, sexuality and HIV, is a major barrier to scale-up of PrEP programs.

=== Condom Availability ===
Even though condom use wasn't endorsed by the Kenyan government until 2001, the rate of condom usage has gradually increased ever since. Free condoms have been distributed throughout different communities, including the sex workers community. This has decreased unprotected sex, which is critical in lowering new HIV infections.

=== Education ===
Education about HIV/AIDS has been in the school curriculum since 2003, and it has been effective in increasing knowledge within children about the disease. There has been some controversy about the ethics of teaching students about sexual health, due to the fear that it would encourage young people to have sex. However, rates of new HIV infections have said otherwise. Mass media campaigns have also been done to educate people about HIV/AIDS.

=== PMTCT ===
Preventing mother to child transmission (PMTCT) has also been a big step in preventing the spread of HIV/AIDS. The country's dedication to eliminating this type of transmission has led to a drop of children born with HIV from 12,000 children in 2010 to 6,600 in 2015. Male partners have also been encouraged to take part in this type of treatment, by getting tested along with the soon-to-be mother.

=== VMMC and Harm Reduction ===
Voluntary medical male circumcision (VMMC) was implemented as an option in 2008 in Kenya as a prevention method. By 2016, 92% of men in Kenya are circumcised.

Harm reduction is the distribution of clean needles and syringes along with counseling and medically assisted treatment with methadone, implemented by the government in 2012. The amount of Intravenous drug users that are using clean needles now is up to 90% compared to the 51% in 2012.

Pre-exposure prophylaxis has been an ongoing trend in Kenya, as HIV negative people have been receiving ART to prevent against any future infection of HIV. It is being offered for people who are in high risk groups that have an ongoing risk of HIV infection.

== See also ==
- AIDS pandemic
- HIV/AIDS in Africa
- Sex for Fish
