= Paul F. J. Eagles =

Paul F. J. Eagles is an Emeritus Professor at the University of Waterloo in Canada. He is a Biologist and a Planner, specializing in environmental planning.

Over a span of 30 years, Eagles worked on a wide variety of planning projects, with an especially strong emphasis on the planning and management of parks and protected areas. Since the mid-1980s he undertook international work in nature-based tourism and park tourism, with experience in over 25 countries. Since 1996 he has been the Chair of the Task Force on Tourism and Protected Areas for the World Commission on Protected Areas, of World Conservation Union based in Switzerland. In May 2002, Eagles co-authored the book, Sustainable Tourism in Protected Areas: Guidelines for Planning and Management. This was co-published by the World Conservation Union, the World Tourism Organization and the United Nations Environment Programme as a contribution to the UN Year of Ecotourism. In November 2002 Professor Eagles, in cooperation with Dr. Stephen McCool of the University of Montana, published his 15th book, entitled: Tourism in National Parks and Protected Areas: Planning and Management.

He has over 330 publications, including 17 books.
