= Fisheries crime =

Organized crime in the fishing industry

Fisheries crime describes the wide range of criminal activity that is common along the entire value chain of the fishing sector. It often occurs in conjunction with Illegal, unreported and unregulated fishing (IUU), but next to illegal fish extraction include for example corruption, document fraud, tax evasion, money laundering, kidnapping, human trafficking and drug trafficking. The issue recently received increased attention in the UN, Interpol, and several other international bodies.

In the UN fisheries crimes gained relevance due to the realization that industrial fishing has close links to transnational organized crime, that the industry is vulnerable to criminal activities all along its value chain, and that the traditional fisheries management approach under the Food and Agriculture Organization are not fit to meet these challenges.

== Enablers of fisheries crime ==
Fisheries crimes are enabled by weak national and regional governance, a lack of cooperation between countries and their law enforcement agencies, and the adaptivity of criminals on the seas. The modern fishing industry is characterised by complex international supply chains and by industrial trawlers that spend long time on sea and operate over long distances, which makes it difficult to monitor the vessels and enact laws and regulations.

It is very easy for ship owners to change the names of their vessels, the flag they sail under, and the ports they use. Flags of convenience and flag hopping play an essential role in enabling fisheries crime. Under UNCLOS the flag state of a vessel has the responsibility to exercise jurisdiction over the vessel and among other also prevent IUU fishing. Fishing vessels involved in illegal activities will strategically change their flag. Often vessels will also not have a flag registration and therefore be stateless during illegal activities. Changing or unclear ownership makes it almost impossible for law enforcement to act on fisheries crimes. These dynamics make it very difficult to determine which state has jurisdiction over the criminal vessels.

Fish is the most traded food commodity in the world and high demand makes fish a profitable resource. However, declining fish stocks and overfishing incentivise illegal fish extraction and other kinds of crime with the purpose of cutting cost. These factors, combines with the poor oversight and transnational nature of the fishing industry make it extremely venerable to illegal practices and organized crime structures.

Other factors that contribute to the vulnerability of the industry are, inadequate monitoring programs, unclear ownership of vessels, poor socio-economic conditions for fishers and fishing communities, weak enforcement by flag and port states, corruption, and insufficient international regulations for safety and working conditions of fishermen.

== Types of fisheries crime ==
Fisheries crime is often connected to IUU and includes a wide range of crimes along the entire fishing supply chain. The transnational and organized nature of fisheries crime leads the entire value chain to be vulnerable to various crimes that are often connected to one another. International organized crime's involvement in illegal fishing activities is constantly growing due to the perceived low-risk and high reward of these activities. There are limited studies that can quantify the prevalence of crime and organized criminal structures in the fishing sector as the illusive nature of these activities make them hard to measure. However, reports and anecdotal evidence suggests that organized criminal groups increasingly take advantage of the opportunities the sector provides.

=== Fraud ===
The fishing industry is especially vulnerable to fraud and falsified documentation. Especially documents with high monetary value, such as vessel registration certificates, landing documents and fishing licences are being forged. These activities are often associated with ‘flag hopping’ and include sailing under a wrong flag, disguising a vessel's identity, or altering documents. Moreover, catch records can be altered to avoid quotas, product might be labelled to avoid customs payments. Another common type of fraud is food fraud which includes mislabelling of food, species substitution, counterfeiting, or dilution.

=== Corruption ===
Corruption occurs at all stages of the fishing value chain. Politicians are bribed to influence license allocation, ship registrations can be obtained using bribes, bribes might be paid to avoid fines or fines will not be reported and embezzled by officials. Another common form of corruption is the bribery of fishing inspectors to support wrongful documentation or ignore other crimes such as forced labour.

=== Tax crime ===
Due to the transnational nature of the fishing industry and the easy with which vessels can change their flag, tax avoidance is commonplace in the industry. These crimes also go hand in hand with document fraud and similar offences.

Common forms of tax crime in the fishing industry include evasion of income tax, social security fraud, evasion of import and export duties and false claims regarding VAT repayments.

=== Money laundering ===
Transnational organized crime groups use money laundering to conceal the illegal origins of their proceeds and enable them to spend it in the legitimate market. In the fishing industry this include acquisition of assets such as fishing vessels or through cash salary pay-outs.

=== Fish laundering ===
Related to money laundering is the crime of fish laundering where illegally extracted fish is mixed with legally caught fish before landing to conceal its origin. Several fishing vessels will transfer their catch to refrigerator vessels where the fish is mixed. Refrigerator vessels are often exempt from catch documentation requirements which facilitates laundering.

Fishing vessels also commonly call to several ports to unload their catch. At each port the vessel can then unload a full quota of caught fish to avoid catch maximums.

To circumvent minimum size rules of fish, fishing vessels will unload their catch in aquaculture facilities, where they are kept until they have grown large enough to be sold.

=== Human trafficking and labour crime ===
Human trafficking and modern slavery are commonly used by organized crime groups to cut costs and is common in the fishing industry around the globe, where it effects mostly fishermen and sailors. However, also in land based operations cases of forced labour are not uncommon.

As coastal overfishing causes decreased profitability and increased IUU fishing, organized crime groups often try to lower the costs of their fishing operations by decreasing labour costs. Forced labour in IUU fishing has also provided vessels with the economic opportunity of fishing on the high seas, a venture that is otherwise untenable due to excessive costs. A common method is the deception of workers to lure them into forced labour on fishing vessels. Workers are commonly recruited through recruitment agency that under false promises lure workers into signing unfavourable contracts. Once on a vessel the workers will then be entrapped through dept bondage, threats of violence, and withholding of their passports and other documents.

Victims are commonly found to be from countries linked to economic and political underdevelopment and instability. With this leading to increased cases of unemployment, individuals are drawn to opportunities which are unregulated and exploitative in nature. This is evident in the rising issue in the Gulf of Guinea off of West Africa, a current hotspot for maritime crimes.

Several academics cite the corruption, poverty and unemployment as a consequence of western colonisation which is used to explain the disproportionate occurrence of the practice in former colonies and underdeveloped countries.

The sea itself contributes to the prevalence of the problem. Through its geographically isolating nature, those engaging in human trafficking and labour crimes are able to risk these violations without much concern of interference by law enforcement. This coupled with corruptible diplomats and officials on land enables the practice to continue essentially uninterrupted.

Other crimes in regards to labour in the fishing industry include breach of labour regulations, document forgery, and sexual abuse.

According to a 2023 report by the Financial Transparency Coalition, vessels flagged to China are the top suspected labor abusers among national fishing fleets.

The extent to which forced labour scenarios are occurring worldwide is difficult to establish due to its evasive criminal nature, however, efforts have been made using satellite monitoring and machine learning to create an estimate of 57,000 to 100,000 individuals working on high-risk vessels.

=== Smuggling ===
Fishing vessels are convenient vehicles for drug trafficking. In 2011 a UNDOC study found that fishing vessels are involved in drug trafficking in several ways: vessels can be used as base station from which smaller vessels transport drugs, as support ships that provide fuel and resources to vessels on drug trafficking routs, or to transport drugs between base ships in international waters and the coasts of destination states.

The smuggling of migrants on fishing vessels is also common. This is especially common in South America. Other products smuggled include arms but also fuel, and commodities like food, timber, and ivory which are smuggled to avoid customs and restrictions. Fishing vessels are also commonly involved in the smuggling of fuel.

== Effects of fisheries crimes ==
Fisheries crime is one of the main enablers of illegal fishing around the globe and is therefore facilitating the depletion of global fish stocks and threatens the sustainable use of the oceans. Depletion of fish stocks is also a risk for vulnerable coastal communities and causes monetary losses for states that rely on revenues from fishing.

Fisheries crime decreases the costs of fishing operations significantly, giving illegal operations an advantage over law abiding fishers, which created a difficult market environment for them.

Where organised criminal networks operate in the fishing sector, funds from one illegal activity will often enable other related crimes. For example, in West Africa drug traffickers commonly use trans-shipments between fishing vessels, meaning fishing vessels transporting their catch to a larger storage vessel, as a means to transport drugs.

== International responses ==
In the early 2000s fisheries crime gained attention internationally, as various prominent cases of illegal activities brought international attention the issue of transnational organized crime in the fishing sector and the lack of effective countermeasures. The cases of the vessels Elektron and Joana in 2005 and 2006 highlighted the transnational nature of fishing offences and the issues these cause for law enforcement and prosecutors. In 2022 a fraud case involving three Norwegian fishing companies brought attention the vulnerability towards crime in other parts of the value chain then just the fish extraction itself. These events, and advocacy by Norway, paved the way for a shift in perception in international politics, recognizing the transnational and organized nature of fishery crimes and the need for cooperation on tackling these issues.

Until then, on the international level, even though the dire impacts of illegal fishing were recognized, they were still addressed through managerial approaches, mainly through the UN the Food and Agriculture Organization (FAO), which is responsible for compliance with IUU guidelines.

Fisheries Crime gained relevance when the United Nations General Assembly Fisheries Resolution of 2008 acknowledged the possible connection between organized crime and illegal fishing in some regions of the world. However, it was the United Nations Office on Drugs and Crime (UNODC) 2011 study on transnational organized crime in the fishing industry that served as a breakthrough for the concept. The study found that the fisheries sector is vulnerable to multiple crimes, including corruption, document fraud, illegal fishing, and human trafficking and increasingly involved international organized crime structures. The report recommended addressing illegal fishing from a criminal law angle in addition to traditional fisheries management approaches.

As a result, in 2011 the United Nations Commission on Crime Prevention and Criminal Justice (CCPCJ) adopted Resolution 20/5 on transnational organized crime committed at sea, with specific reference to the UNODC study on the fishing industry, and established an expert group to address the issue. The resolution also identified the UN Convention Against Transnational Organized crime (UNTOC) as legal framework to address these issues, shifting away from a regulatory towards a criminal justice approach on the international level.

The development of the fisheries crime concept and the processes to address it in the international arena has been a gradual but significant shift towards recognizing and combatting the criminal nature of illegal fishing. In 2016 an expert group was formed by the UNODC and WWF which since then has issued several reports on the topic. In the same year UNODC initiated the project FishNet which aims at supporting developing countries in addressing these crimes and in 2018 the FishCrime conference was held in Copenhagen where the International Declaration on Transnational Organised Crime in the Global Fishing Industry was adopted and signed by 9 countries.

As a response to fisheries crimes Interpol has created their Global Fisheries Enforcement team which assists member countries to fight fisheries crime and facilitate cooperation between states. One example is the detention of the IUU vessel Uthaiwan which belongs to an organized illegal fishing fleet by Thai authorities with the support of Interpol.

All together the movement to view fishery crime as a transnational, criminal issue, which should be addressed through criminal sanctions and increased cooperation is gaining traction but is still developing. The idea is most prominent in the international arena with the UN and its institutions being most involved in putting forward the notion of fisheries crime. Other organizations such as ASEAN have also embraced the concept. Generally, the danger of Fisheries Crime, which has long been a blind spot, has been recognized in the international community.

=== To human trafficking and labour crime ===
Several initiatives have been established to battle human trafficking as a fisheries crime.

The U.S. have one such initiative with their Tier Structure, labelling as Tier 2 and placing on a watch list countries that "do not fully meet the minimum standards but are making significant efforts to bring themselves into compliance."

On an international level the International Labour Organisation established the Global Action Programme against forced labour and trafficking of fishers at sea (GAPfish). This initiative seeks to research the recruitment and exploitation of victims, develop prevention, prosecution and protection strategies, improve the role of agencies, officials and prosecution capacity in port states and establish other initiatives to encourage further involvement from the industry in compliance and prevention.

Important work is being done on the monitoring and detection of forced labour situations by academics of varying disciplines. Economists, human rights experts, political scientists and machine learning experts have all worked together in order to develop a model that can help detect instances of forced labour. This models shows promise for further development that if scaled correctly could provide essential assistance to policing and compliance in port states around the globe.

The most important response to the issues remains at the immediate level with the cooperation and compliance of ports around the globe. The Port State Measures Agreement is a useful tool in achieving this goal. Entered into in June 2016 the agreement works in the countries where the vessels dock. However, critics have voiced concerns with its efficacy in certain states where corruption persists and monitoring and surveillance techniques are not adequate to deal with the issue. Concerns have also been voiced for what critics say is an inadequate overall structure of international response to the issue and calls have been made to provide port-states with mandatory instruments to ensure the requirements for compliance are met as well as specific assistance for certain countries to tackle the unique issues they may face.

== Domestic responses ==
Several States have introduced domestic legal mechanisms to tackle fisheries crime.

Norway, where illegal fishing has been criminalized since 1937, was the first country to develop a national concept of fisheries crime. Certain violations with Norwegian fisheries regulation were punishable under criminal law (instead of mere regulatory sanctions).

Indonesia integrated provisions against fisheries crimes into its fisheries legislation in 2009. Additionally changes were made in law enforcement, coordination between agencies, port measures were strengthened, and the jurisdiction of Indonesia's fisheries court were extended.

In Australia, concerns that penalties for illegal activities in the fishing sector were insufficient, amended its Fisheries Management Act to include provisions on 'trafficking in fish' and attached criminal justice penalties to it.

In the Philippines amended its anti-money laundering legislation and now recognized the connection between illegal fishing and money laundering.

These examples show how fisheries crime can be approached through different legal angles, however, due to its multifaceted nature and its positioning between fisheries law, environmental law, and transnational criminal law it is difficult to address. Most states rely on their existing legislation and on cooperation through international organizations to tackle the issue.

== Prominent cases ==
=== The rock lobster case ===
In 2001 the US company Hout Bay Fishing Industries was found to have illegally caught rock lobsters in South Africa and smuggled them into the US. A joint investigation between the two countries revealed that the network operated for over 20 years and had bribed a large number of fisheries officers. The profits were laundered through a complex web of international shell companies. The director was tried in South Africa for among others fraud, corruption, bribery and racketeering.

=== The Elektron case ===
In 2005 a Russian vessel, sailing under the Cambodian flag by the Norwegian coast guard. The vessel was suspected to have violated fishing regulations by illegally transhipping fish to a refrigerator vessel. The Elektron was arrested by the authorities but after being ordered to sail to the port of Tromsø it changed course and fled towards Russian waters, escaping the Norwegian coast guard. In 2007 the vessel was finally arrested by Ghanaian authorities in the Gulf of Guinea where it had also committed violations of fishing regulation. At this point the vessel had changed its name to Cliff to conceal its identity. The vessel was fined with two million dollars.

=== The Viking case ===
In 2016 the fishing vessel Viking was detained by Indonesian authorities after a notice by Interpol. The vessel was found to have sailed under several flags and false names. The vessel had illegally fished for Patagonian toothfish and the owners were found to have been involved in a long term scheme of fishing, landing, and marketing these protected fish. Moreover, the papers of the vessel were forgeries. The investigations unveiled the transnational nature of the network behind the vessel as the operator was an Australian citizen located in Singapore, the owner was a Spanish national located in South Africa, and the vessel was operating out of ports in South Asia and Africa.
