= WCPA High Seas Task Force =

The World Commission on Protected Areas (WCPA)'s High Seas Task Force spans decades. It was officially established in 2003 following the Vth IUCN World Parks Congress where marine experts formulated a 10-Year High Seas MPA Strategy. The 10 year Strategy built upon the results of a joint IUCN, WCPA and WWF expert's workshop on high seas MPAs in January 2003: Towards a Strategy for High Seas MPAs

== Goal ==
Their goal is to achieve for the High Seas the fundamental objectives of the 1988 World Conservation Strategy—repeated in IUCN's Guidelines for Marine Protected Areas:

- to maintain essential ecological processes and life support systems;
- to preserve genetic diversity; and
- to ensure the sustainable utilization of species and ecosystems.

== Membership ==
The WCPA High Seas MPA Task Force is co-chaired by Kristina Gjerde, High Seas Policy Advisor for the IUCN, and Alistair Graham, an international policy consultant with WWF and other organizations. The Task Force contains over 20 individual experts from a variety of government agencies, conservation organizations, scientific institutions, universities, and media. These individuals include Graeme Kelleher, Sylvia Earle, Elliott Norse, Arlo Hemphill, Jeff Ardron, Dan Laffoley, Sheila Mckenna, Sue Taei and Lisa Speer.

== See also ==
- Natural Resources Defense Council
