= Sex for fish =

Transactional sex in exchange for fish

Sex for fish, sometimes referred to as fish for sex, is a socio-economic practice in which female fish traders engage, often forced, in transactional sexual relationships with fishermen to secure their supply of fish. Denying sexual practices can exclude them from trading and earning an income. Sex for fish is common in many developing countries, with the bulk of cases observed in Sub-Saharan Africa's inland fisheries. The practice is most common among economically disadvantaged women, such as single women, divorced women, or widows, who reside on or along the shores of inland fisheries.

Several socio-economic factors, including poverty, cultural practices, and competition among women who are involved in the fish trade, are often listed as causes contributing to the practice of sex for fish. Although there is no conclusive research to show what promotes the practice, it has been theorized that fishermen take advantage of stiff competition between the women who trade in fish to demand sexual favours in exchange for the fish. The men or the traders who receive sexual favours would grant preferential sales and sell at reduced prices to these women.

On the shores of Lake Victoria in Kenya, women have been observed giving out empty polythene bags to the fishermen before they go out fishing at night or early morning, and when the fishermen return, some of the best catch would be set aside for them, stashed in these bags.

== Poverty ==
In Kenya, where sex for fish has been well documented, poverty among the fishing communities has consistently been listed as a factor contributing to the practice of sex for fish. The sex for fish practice in Kenya is popularly referred to as the Jaboya system. 'Jaboya' in the Luo tribe dialect means customer; due to the transactional involvement of fishermen with female fish traders, the locals coined the term 'Jaboya system' to refer to the practice of sex for fish. In Kenya's third-largest city, Kisumu, sex for fish trading with adolescent girls has also been observed. In many cases, sex for fish trading is taught to young girls by their mothers, who practice the trade themselves. The prevalence of sex for fish among adolescent girls has led to an increase in sexually transmitted diseases in adolescents, including HIV.

== Exploitation of gay men ==
In September 2012, a Kenyan TV station reported incidents where gay men exchanged sex for fish. This occurred due to a poor catch or for money. Impoverished gay men had become the latest group to be involved in sex for fish within fishing communities.

== HIV/AIDS prevalence ==
Some of the earliest recorded cases of HIV/AIDS in Africa were in fishing communities around Lake Victoria in 1982. Several studies have shown a link between the practice of sex for fish and higher HIV prevalence.

In Kenya, it is assumed that sex for fish contributes to the high HIV/AIDS prevalence in the Lake Victoria region, where it is double the national average. HIV transmission is higher in these areas due to the fact that these women have no control over the use of condoms as a preventive measure against the spread of HIV and other sexually transmitted diseases.

In Uganda, studies conducted around Lake George and Lake Edward by the Uganda Fisheries and Fish Conservation Association (UFFCA) found that the HIV/AIDS prevalence average rate was 22.4 percent, against the national prevalence of 7.3 percent. Sex for fish is considered by many leaders and researchers as one of the factors that has led to higher HIV/AIDS prevalence amongst these fishing communities.

In Mangochi, Malawi, sex is a big part of the fishing industry, and research has shown a strong link between HIV prevalence and the sex for fish trade. Transactional sex is common in Malawian fishing communities, with women identified as vulnerable in negotiations due to existing gendered power structures. Men carry out the process of catching fish; therefore, men control factors of production, while women only control the processing, drying, and selling of the fish. Due to the control of production factors by men, the power dynamics in these exchanges favour men and make it more difficult for women to negotiate safe sex. The Malawian NGO, Youth Net and Counselling (YONECO), that works to combat the spread of HIV infection in Malawi, observed that despite increased awareness of HIV/AIDS in Malawi, fishermen on Lake Chilwa are queuing for sex. This was disclosed by fishermen who were trained by YONECO as peer educators during a monitoring visit the organization made to Mposa in Machinga district. The reports indicate that a total of 25 fishermen would line up to have sex with one woman, in exchange for 15 dozen fish if no condom was used during sexual intercourse or 3 dozen fish if a condom was used.

In the Kafue Flats region of Zambia, the exchange of sex for fish increased the spread of HIV/AIDS rapidly between the years 2002–2005.

== Interventions ==
=== U.S. Peace Corps ===
In 2010, two Peace Corps volunteers, Dominik Mucklow and Michael Geilhufe, who lived near Lake Victoria, decided to help the women who were trapped in the practice of sex for fish. With support from the U.S. President's Emergency Plan for AIDS Relief (PEPFAR) funding, they assisted a group of female fish traders in acquiring their own fishing boats. The women then employed men to go fishing using these boats. This simple advancement allowed women to be free from sexual exploitation in order to secure their fish supply. This action aimed to change the work dynamic between the women and the men who make their living from the fishing industry by giving women ownership of the means of production, namely boats. The women own the boats, and as the women work, they repay the cost of building the boats. The boat repayment money is pooled to construct more boats, increasing the number of women involved. The pilot project was managed by the Victoria Institute for Research on Environment and Development.

=== Merlin ===
Merlin, an organization that brings together local leaders and community members, has created several theatre groups in Western Kenya that perform skits and plays that deal with the issues brought about by the practice of sex for fish (the Jaboya system). The shows take place once per month and coincide with the return of the fishermen to the beach. The shows typically draw large crowds on the beach and end with a discussion, as well as condom distribution to the fishermen. Local people believe that the shows are getting the local community to change their thinking about the Jaboya system and ultimately their behavior as well.

=== No Sex For Fish ===
The “No Sex for Fish” initiative combats this by providing women with boats, nets, and financial support so they can fish independently. A dedicated mobile app allows women to buy fish without negotiating directly with fishermen, reducing their vulnerability to coercion, poverty, and HIV transmission.

== Deadly Catch ==
Deadly Catch is a film that was produced by IRIN and centers around the fishing community in Bondo, Kenya. It shows how the HIV virus has affected different people in various ways, focusing on those both directly involved with the Jaboya system and those who have lost family members due to it.
