= Ruth Uzzell =

British trade unionist

- Born: Ruth Freeman; 7 October 1880; Tysoe, Warwickshire, England
- Died: 2 November 1945 (aged 65); Oxford, Oxfordshire, England
- Occupations: Trade unionist, speaker
- Organization: National Union of Agricultural Workers
- Movement: Labour; Co-operative

Ruth Uzzell (née Freeman; 7 October 1880 – 2 November 1945) was a British trade unionist, speaker, and member of the executive committee of the National Union of Agricultural Workers. She has been described as "one of the many gifted working-class women who found in the Labour Movement a way to selfless and unswerving service to their class", becoming a well-known speaker throughout England and Wales. She was the first Labour woman elected to Oxford City Council.

== Early life ==
Ruth Freeman was born in Tysoe, Warwickshire, into a family of agricultural workers and union members. Her father and grandfather had both been members of Joseph Arch's National Agricultural Labourers' Union. In her younger years, she worked as a servant in a farm house, an experience which historian Nicola Verdon has described as giving her "a genuine understanding and sympathy for the rural working-class woman". She was also strongly influenced by meeting George Edwards, a founder of the union which became the National Union of Agricultural and Allied Workers. Ruth married Harry Charles Uzzell in 1903.

== Labour and Union work ==
In 1903, Uzzell joined the Independent Labour Party, rising to become prominent in both the Labour and co-operative movements. Ultimately, she served on the executive committee of the National Union of Agricultural Workers (NUAW) for 22 years, as well as acting as a branch, district, and county committee secretary. She lectured widely, speaking on Labour and NUAW platforms. To these, and to the pages of the Labour press, she brought a woman's perspective on agricultural work. As Nicola Verdon has written, Uzzell:

was exasperated by the argument that women should be barred from agricultural work whilst men were unemployed. The majority of women who went out to work, she contended, ‘do not do so from the desire to shirk the duties and responsibilities of the home, but are forced out to work owing to the rotten economic condition of their lives’.

Uzzell expressed her frustration with changing attitudes to women's roles during and after wartime or periods of economic turmoil, writing: "When the women took the men’s place during the war they were called saviours of the Empire, but in peace time they are termed invaders and superfluous." According to Reginald Groves, Uzzell was the first woman elected to the Oxford City Council. Historian Elizabeth Longford recalled:

So attractive was Ruth Uzzell that when she stood for the Oxford Council the local Communist Party decided not to put up a candidate against her. Not only did she romp home but also won the Beautiful Ankles competition at the Singletree Labour fete.

== Death ==
Uzzell stood down from the NUAW's executive committee in 1945, as a result of ill health, and died the same year.
