= Kerne Bridge (River Wye crossing) =

Historic road bridge in Herefordshire, England

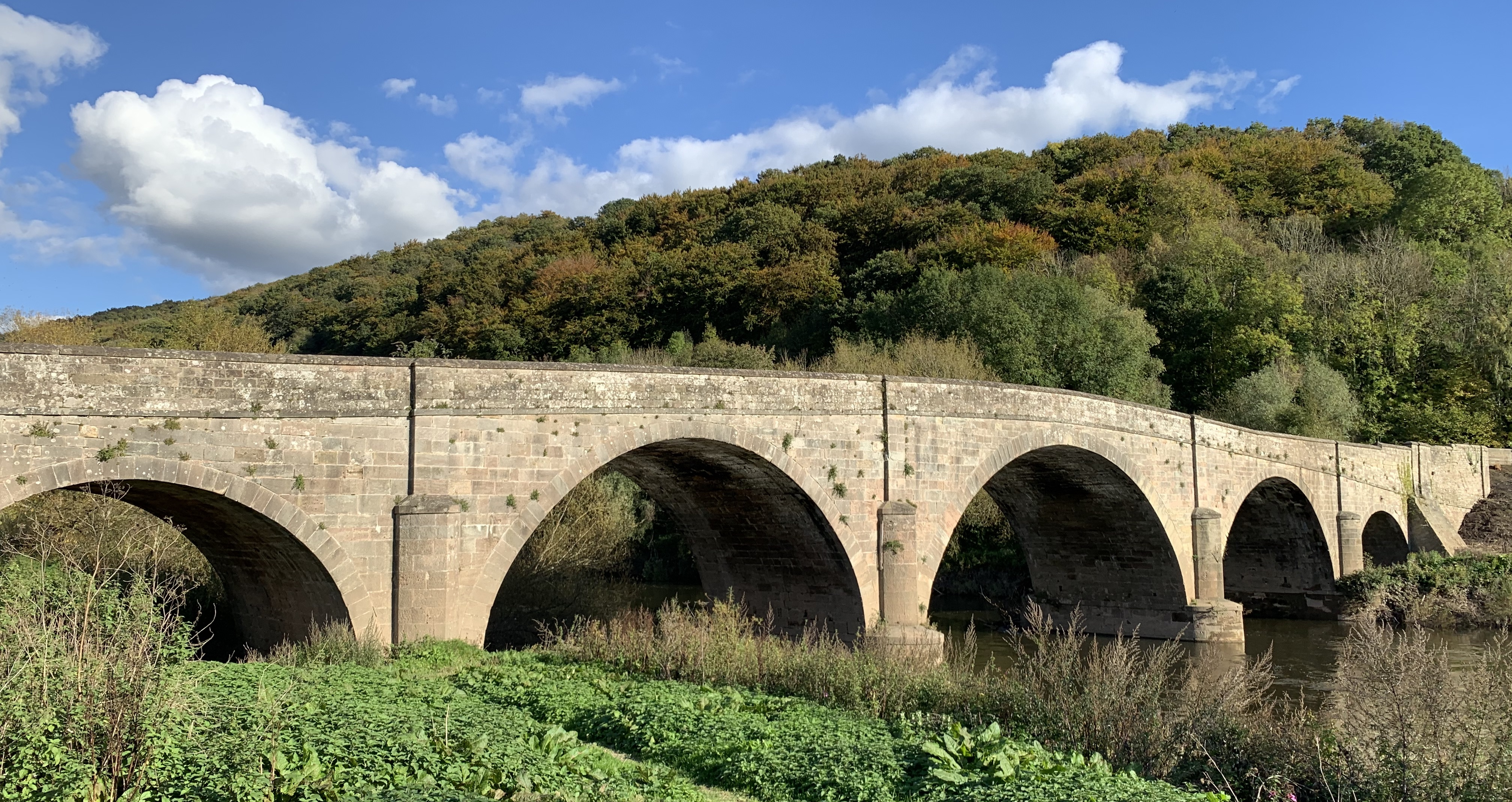
- Coordinates: 51.86800°N 2.60849°W
- OS grid reference: SO 58077 19225
- Carries: All traffic on B4229 road
- Crosses: River Wye
- Locale: Herefordshire, England
- Named for: Historic hamlet The Kerne (now known as Kerne Bridge) on left bank of river
- Owner: Herefordshire Council
- Heritage status: Scheduled Monument (Historic England)
- List Entry Number: 1005534
- Preceded by: Wilton Bridge
- Followed by: Huntsham Bridge

Characteristics
- Design: Arch
- Material: Local stone
- Total length: 97.54 m (320.0 ft)
- Width: 8.01 m (26.3 ft)
- No. of spans: 5
- Piers in water: 2

History
- Designer: Richard Burton
- Engineering design by: William Armstrong
- Constructed by: David Jones
- Construction start: 1825
- Construction end: 1828
- Opened: 1828

Location
- Interactive map of Kerne Bridge

Kerne Bridge was built over the River Wye in the County of Herefordshire, England in 1825–28, on the site of an ancient ford crossing known as Flanesford. It is designated as a Scheduled Monument. Carrying the B4229 road, it connects the parishes of Walford on the river's left bank and Goodrich on the right. It is situated in the heart of the Wye Valley Area of Outstanding Natural Beauty and marks the northern end of the Upper Wye Gorge.

== History ==
Kerne Bridge was built on the site of a Pre-Roman ford across the River Wye. This ancient crossing came to be known as Flanesford before 1346 when the first stone of Flanesford Priory was laid nearby "in loco Flanesford vulgariter nuncupato" (in the place commonly called Flanesford).

The origins of the name Flanesford are obscure. It has been suggested that it was derived from an English-Welsh conjunction, the Welsh llan (church or enclosure) joined to the English ford, or possibly the Welsh ffordd (way) but it is more likely the prefix is the Old English flanes from flan (arrow).

On the Forest of Dean side of the ford, on the left bank, a primitive manually operated mill for grinding corn came to be established. This type of mill was known in Old English as a cweorn. The presence of the mill gave the name - The Cweorn - to the small settlement which became established there. Over time the spelling of the name of the settlement was simplified to The Quern. Records show that it was still known that way until at least 1815, but by the mid-1820s spelling simplification had further altered its name to The Kerne.

Flanesford became an increasingly crucial river crossing for trade and the delivery of commodities from the Forest of Dean to the city of Hereford and south Herefordshire generally. Of most importance was the transport of iron from the Bishopswood ironworks on the left bank of the Wye just downstream from Flanesford, and of coal from the collieries of the Forest of Dean (particularly as the fast-growing population and industry of Hereford required increasing amounts of coal). As well as iron and coal the 18th and 19th centuries saw a steady growth in south Herefordshire "in the numbers of wagons and carts drawn by horses or oxen. Daily commodities of stone, brick, timber, poles, lathes, lime, ... corn, hay and manure were conveyed.".

The ford, however, could only be used when the river was not in flood. While travellers on foot deemed it acceptable to wade across up to armpit depth and horses could be taken across up to chest height the river had a tendency to flood extremely quickly following poor weather upstream, which writers of the early nineteenth century wrote gave the river "a force which defies all the ordinary means of resistance and control". When Flanesford and other fords nearby were unusable, and the local ferries capable of carrying animals were unable to sail, the only alternatives for road transport were the bridges upstream at Wilton, near Ross-on-Wye, and downstream at Monmouth (Trefynwy). They were 21 river-miles apart and because of the poor roads and the mileage involved, diversions via the bridges were long, time-consuming and expensive.

An alternative means of transport - using barges on the river - was equally unfeasible at times of flood, or in dry summer when the river bed was "barely covered with the stream". The 35-miles distance to Hereford by the river was also two-thirds further than by road.

A further obstruction to trade was that the roads in Herefordshire were historically in a neglected and wretched condition. One Herefordshire historian has described the roads in the county as "impenetrable and impassable, churned into mud by horses hooves and deeply rutted by wheeled vehicles". Though the county's roads were being steadily improved after the mid-eighteenth century by the introduction of turnpike trusts, in 1825 the first few miles of parish roads from Flanesford towards Hereford remained in an appalling state.

== Proposals for a bridge at Flanesford ==
By the early 1820s local industrialists and traders had decided that a bridge should be erected over the ford, between the hamlet of The Kerne and Flanesford Priory, with upgraded roads proceeding onwards 3 kilometres or so to Old Forge, where they would join the turnpikes to Ross-on-Wye and Hereford, "by means of which a more convenient communication will be effected between the Collieries in the Forest of Dean and the County of Hereford".

Those who proposed the bridge were not without opposition, however. They faced competition from the owners of the Goodrich-Walford Ferry, situated 700 metres upstream from The Kerne, whose owners wanted to build their own bridge at Goodrich Boat on the 1749 Ross to Goodrich turnpike (previously a Roman road). They notified their intentions to lay a Bill before Parliament only two weeks after the Kerne Bridge advocates had announced their similar application. The Goodrich-Walford bridge plan was not pursued, however, and the ferry, although facing severe competition from Kerne Bridge, continued to provide a service under a statutory duty until 1945.

There was no recorded opposition from another ferry, which had been operating for at least 106 years only about 400 metres downstream from Flanesford, known as the Stocking Boat (named after June Stockings, the occupier at one time of a cottage near the ferry on the right bank of the river). It continued to operate despite the competition from Kerne Bridge. However, the erection of Kerne railway bridge across the river in 1873 saw the ferry's business much reduced, leading to its closure. Despite regulations to the contrary, the rail bridge was much used by pedestrians as a short cut and as a means of avoiding the tolls on Kerne Bridge.

Some of those whose commercial or landowning interests might have been about to be jeopardised by a new bridge made public their objections. One correspondent to the Hereford Journal newspaper in 1823 complained of "the evils" that would arise, such as "the cutting through of valuable Lands and Orcharding for Miles, dividing Homesteads from Farms, running through Parishes where there are already good and sufficient Roads nearly parallel with and close to this projected line; that it must eventually be throwing on such Parishes as well as on the Agricultural Interest of this County, unnecessary burthens and extra Tolls as may readily be seen upon estimating the enormous expense of making the Bridge and Road, probably £20,000!!!"

== Authority for building Kerne Bridge ==
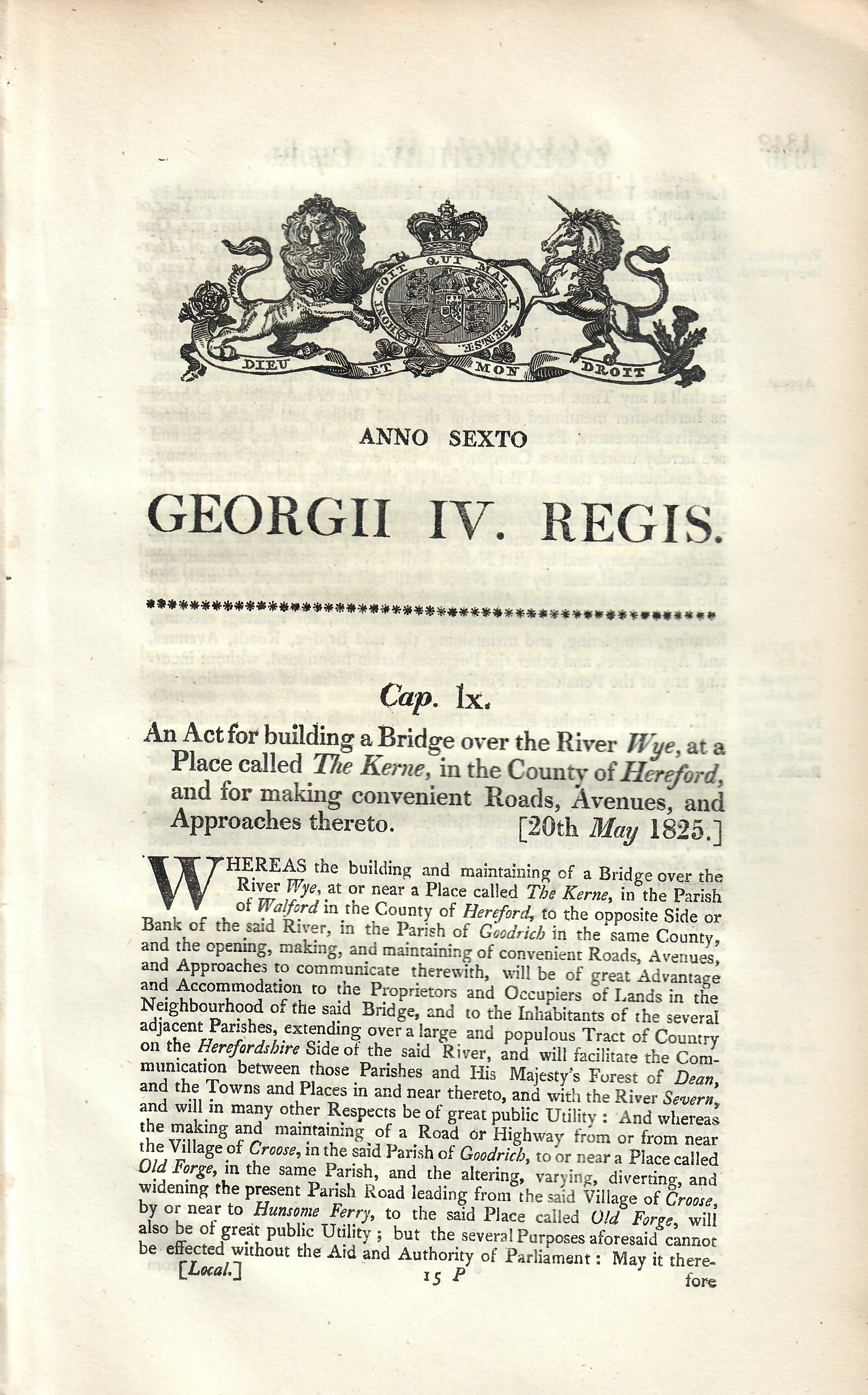
The Kerne Bridge Act 1825

The building of the bridge required an Act of Parliament.

A Petition for leave to bring in a Bill for the bridge's building was presented to the House of Commons in the spring of 1823 but it was withdrawn in consequence of the Standing Orders not being fully complied with. In October 1824 notice was given that a new application would be made to Parliament in the next Session for leave to bring in the Bill and the petition was successfully presented on 10 February 1825

The Bill was read for the first time in the House of Commons on 25 February 1825 and for a second time on 1 March 1825. The House of Lords approved it, without amendment, on 16 May 1825.

The Act for the building of "a Bridge over the River Wye, at a Place called The Kerne, in the County of Hereford, and for making convenient Roads, Avenues, and Approaches thereto" received Royal Assent in May 1825.

It allowed for the building of a bridge at Flanesford between the parish of Walford on the left bank of the Wye, and the parish of Goodrich on the opposite bank. On the Walford side it would connect with the 1749 turnpike from Ross-on-Wye and its 1815 extension towards Bishopswood (now the B4234). On the Goodrich side it would connect with a new road to the village of Croose in Goodrich. The Act also allowed for the diverting, altering, and widening of the existing parish roads between Croose and Old Forge where they connected with the 1749 turnpike to Ross (now the A40) and the 1819 turnpike towards Hereford (now the A4137).

== The Kerne Bridge Company ==
The Act required a company, to be named The Kerne Bridge Company, to be set up to erect and maintain the bridge and to make and maintain the roads connecting to it. Once the bridge was in operation the company would be allowed to charge tolls for the upkeep of it and the connecting roads and for the profit of the company shareholders.

=== The initial shareholders ===
The initial shareholders of The Kerne Bridge Company were:

- John Allen
- Thomas Bennett
- Richard Blakemore, the owner of the Melingriffith Tin Plate Works in Whitchurch, Cardiff, local landowner and Member of Parliament
- John Harpur
- Richard Harrison, a Walford landowner
- William Lewis
- Richard and William Morgan
- John Partridge, a Bishopswood landowner
- James Pearce, a Walford landowner
- Joseph Robins the younger, George Robins and Thomas Robins, Walford landowners
- Henry Rosser
- James Russel, an ironmaster of Lydbrook
- William Tombs, a publican at Whitchurch, Herefordshire
- Thomas Tovey, the owner of a wharf on the river at Bridstow
- John Trotter
- Reverend James Endell Tyler, the Monmouth-born Rector of St Giles in the Fields in London and a landowner at Whitchurch, Herefordshire
- William Vaughan, the owner of the nearby Courtfield Estate, Welsh Bicknor, then in Monmouthshire but now in Herefordshire, and Bishopswood landowner
- James Ward of the Lydney Trading Society, which ran the horse-drawn Lydney and Lydbrook railway from collieries in the Forest of Dean to Bishopswood.

== Specifications for Kerne Bridge ==
The Act required the making of "a good and substantial Bridge, with Abutments, made of Stone, Iron, Brick, or other durable Materials at or near the Place called The Kerne". It specified that there should not be more than three arches over the river, with a number of land arches allowed on each side. One of the river arches was to be at least 50 feet (15 metres) wide, with the top of that arch being at least 32 feet (9.8 metres) above the river bed. All the arches collectively were to be not less than 125 feet (38 metres) from one side of the river to the other. The roadway over the bridge was to be a minimum of 20 feet (6.1 metres) wide between the walls, and the ascent to the crown of the bridge was not to be steeper than 1 in 13.

== Financing Kerne Bridge ==
The Act made it lawful for The Kerne Bridge Company to raise sufficient sums (but not exceeding £6000) for the costs of obtaining the Act of Parliament, drawing up plans and building the bridge and roads, with the proviso that all the money must be raised before physical work could start.

In pursuit of funding, in June 1825 the Company gave notice that shares could be bought in the company before 15 July that year. The shares were available at £50 each up to a total for each individual of £1000. In June 1825 the company also invited applications for the situation of Clerk and Surveyor to the company. The salary was to be £100 per annum.

== Building Kerne Bridge and connecting roads ==
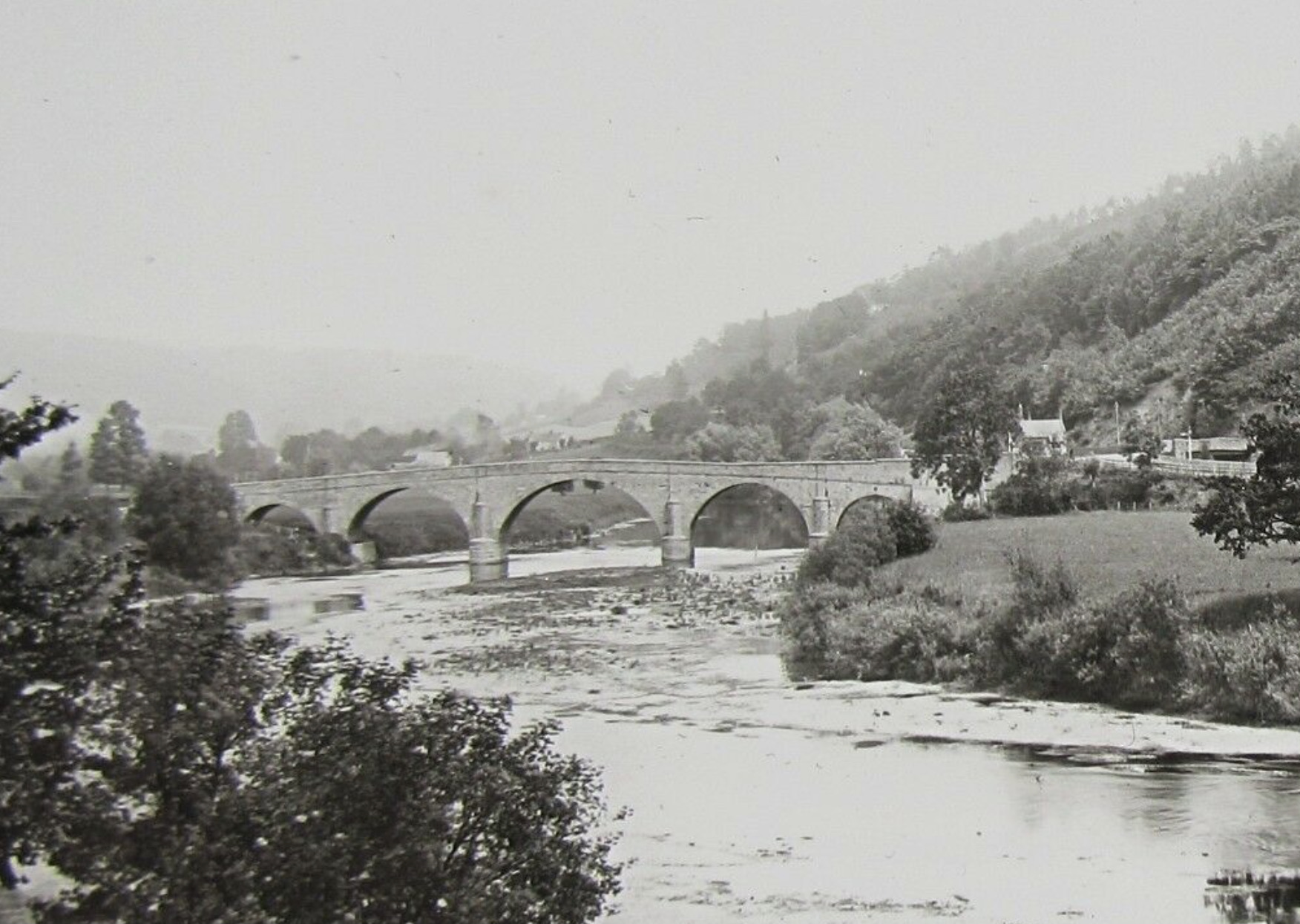
A magic lantern slide of Kerne Bridge showing the later rise in elevation on the left bank approach to encompass the railway. The tollhouse and the railway bridge are to be seen on the far right of the picture. c1885

The Kerne Bridge Company was forced to negotiate with no fewer than eight landowners for the sale of parcels of land necessary for the approaches to the bridge. After acquiring them, in July 1825 the Company called for "Persons inclined to contract for building a bridge over the River Wye at a place called The Kerne in the County of Hereford" to provide plans and estimates by 15 August 1825. The Company declared that the bridge could be built of stone or iron. Otherwise the bridge specifications were as approved in the Act of Parliament. Additionally the Company advertised for "Persons willing to contract for making roads to communicate with the said Bridge from the Turnpike Road leading from the town of Ross to the Village of Lidbrook on the one side, and from the village of Croose on the other side; and also for making a New Line of Road from the said village of Croose to a Place called Old Forge". The estimates for the roads were to be provided by 15 August 1825.

Plans and estimates were submitted and the company's Committee of Management decided that an iron bridge would be too expensive, so a stone bridge was decided upon, to be designed and built by Richard Burton for £4000.

Burton designed an ashlar bridge with five arches, three of the arches being over the river, and one flood arch over the bank on each side to allow for flow escape during high floods. The roadway was to be wide enough for two carriages, a tramway, and a footpath.

Preparatory earthworks and riverworks for building the bridge began in 1825 and on 16 August 1826 the first stone of the bridge abutment foundations was laid. Richard Burton soon withdrew from the project. BD (David) Jones of the Tredegar Ironworks, then in Monmouthshire, now in Blaenau Gwent, took over in 1826 with his engineer William Armstrong and completed the building.

Jones dug two roadside quarries just north of the bridgeworks on the Ross to The Kerne turnpike (now the B4234) to supply the stone for the bridge. The quarries were a convenient source of the variously red, and gritty green-grey, sandstone found locally. The quarries are now disused, though despite the growth of trees and undergrowth they are still observable.

Kerne Bridge was completed and opened in the early summer of 1828.

The bridge Jones built had five segmental arches, varying in span from 30 feet (9.1 metres) to 61 feet (19 metres). The largest, central, arch was flanked by graded arches each separated by triangular-shaped cutwaters rising to pilaster buttresses. Unlike Roman bridges there were cutwaters on both the upstream and downstream sides. There were solid parapets on both sides topped with moulded coping stones. The total length of the bridge was 320 feet (98 metres) with a 20-foot (6.1-metre) carriageway and a 3-foot (0.91-metre) footway.

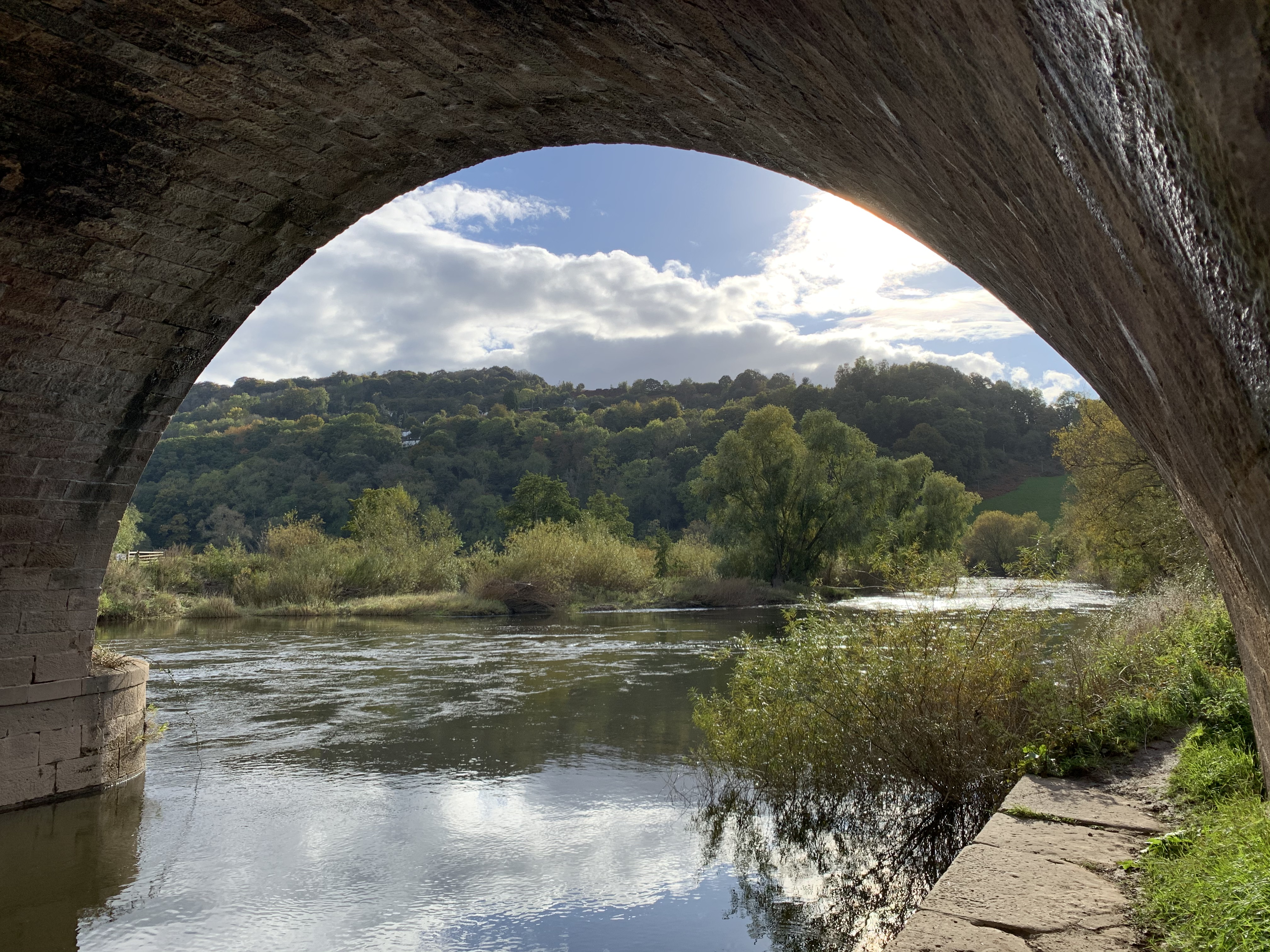
The towpath under Kerne Bridge, looking downstream

It was the only bridge built over the River Wye to accommodate barge traffic, and to aid this traffic Jones built a stone-slab towpath, 5 feet (1.5 metres) wide, through the arch nearest the right bank. At the upstream end of the towpath the remains of a small barge wharf can be seen, though it is uncertain if this was built at the same time.

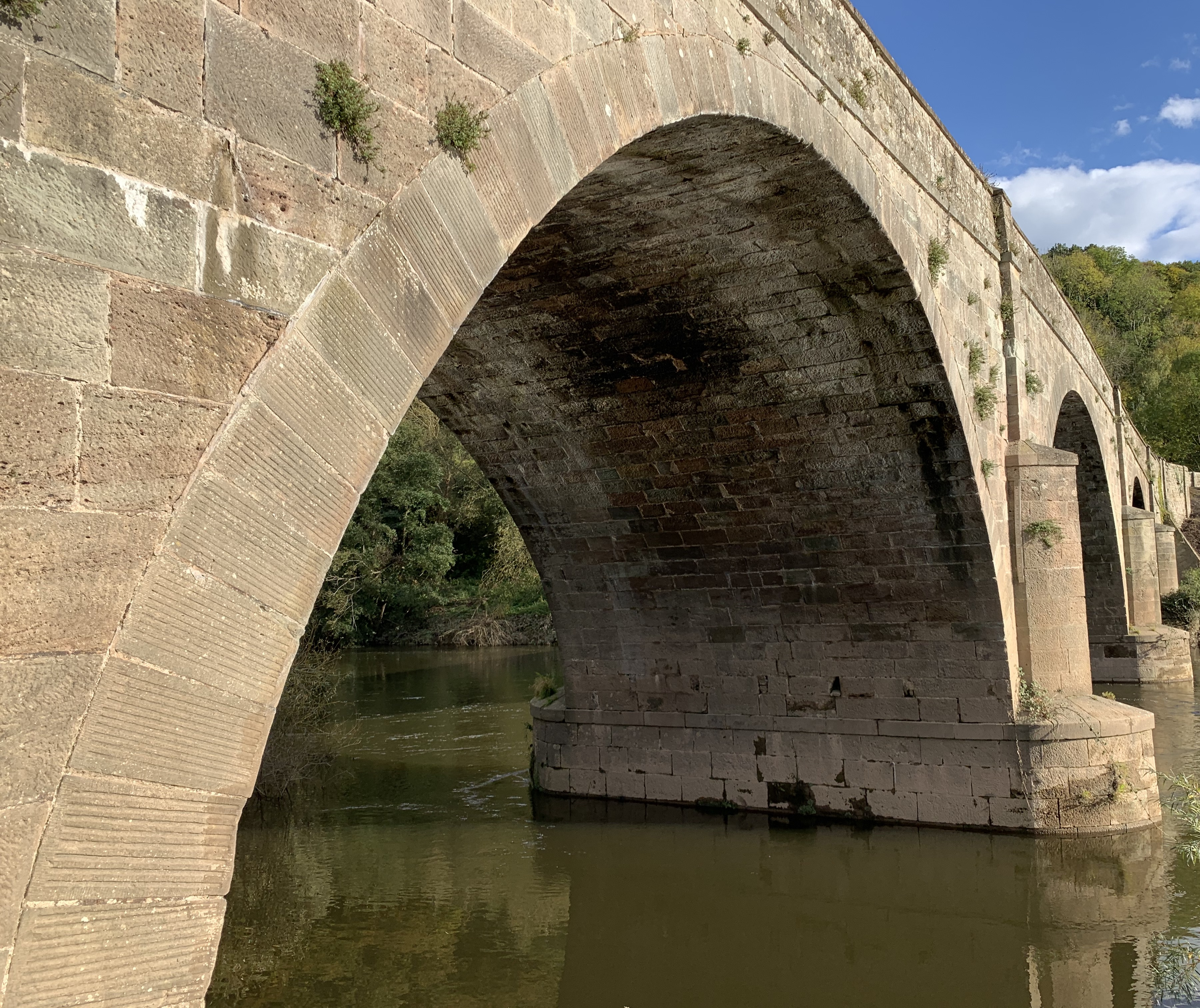
Kerne Bridge, showing the radial carvings to the voussoirs

The bridge was a simple structure with little decoration, though the voussoirs - the wedge-shaped stones of the arches - have a delicately carved milling. As one observer has noted, the working of the voussoirs is "effective in lifting the design" and "reveals how much the builders regarded their work as more than simply utilitarian".

There is a carved inscription in the centre of the inside of the parapet on the downstream side of the bridge recording that it was built by D Jones and opened in 1828.

At the same time as the building of the bridge the Kerne Bridge Company advertised again in June 1827 for tenders for building the new road from the bridge to Croose following the plans, sections and specifications laid out by the company. Work started soon afterwards. To avoid a steep inclination it cut through the sloping ridge between Coppett Hill and Croose. The consequence of this was the new road passed beneath the Croose to Welsh Bicknor road at right-angles, the latter being carried on a new bridge. This bridge is now known as Dry Arch Bridge. It is thought by Historic England that it is one of the earliest examples of traffic separation by use of a "flyover". The bridge and road design also provides an early example of three-dimensional pedestrian traffic by the use of a flight of 33 steps, allowing foot traffic to cross from one road to the other without a lengthy diversion. Dry Arch Bridge was designated as a Scheduled Monument in 1975

At the same time work was carried out by the Kerne Bridge Company to upgrade, improve, and divert the old parish roads leading from Croose to Old Forge. The entire route from Kerne Bridge to Old Forge is now classified as the B4229.

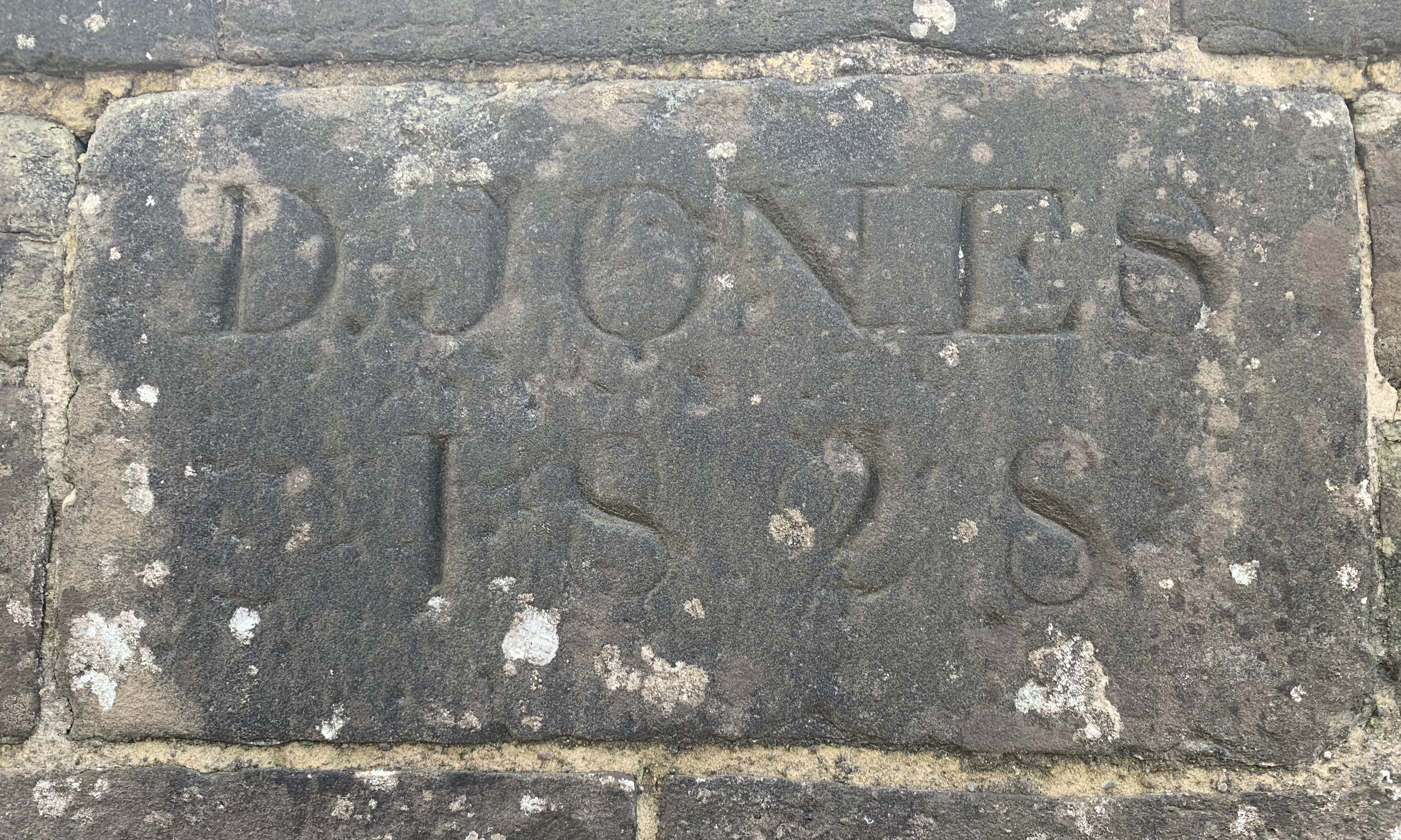
Plaque on the downstream parapet of Kerne Bridge detailing the builder's name and the date of opening.

At a General Meeting of the Kerne Bridge Company on 4 August 1828, with John Partridge in the chair, it was reported "that the Bridge and Roads have been completed and opened for public use, and that a Gate Keeper was appointed for the collection of Tolls on the Twenty-fifth day of June last". The meeting also heard that "The Receipts at the Gate have been, and are progressively increasing, as the utility of the Bridge becomes generally known."

The Committee of Management reported that they "also feel great pleasure in stating that the Bridge Contractor David Jones has executed his contract much to their satisfaction, and in a manner which they think entitles him to the best recommendation of this Company for any undertakings of a similar nature."

The building of the bridge and roads cost more than was originally raised and in May 1826 the Committee of Management made a call of £10 per share from the shareholders and a series of further £10 calls in July and October 1826 and in January, May, June and August 1827. In February 1828 the Company considered "the propriety of raising the Sum of Two Thousand Pounds … by Mortgage of the said Bridge and Roads, and the Tolls arising therefrom" having secured an offer for such a loan.

== Kerne Bridge tolls ==
The 1825 Act of Parliament enabling the building of Kerne Bridge gave power to erect toll gates and charge tolls to those crossing the bridge

The original tolls specified in the Act were 9d for every horse or other beast drawing a wheeled vehicle other than a farm vehicle, 6d for every beast drawing an agricultural vehicle, 2d for every horse or mule laden or unladen, and not drawing a wheeled vehicle, 1d for every ass, 10d for every 20 head of cattle, swine, sheep or lambs, 1d for every person crossing the bridge on foot or riding on or in a wheeled vehicle or riding on a beast drawing a wheeled vehicle.

A board listing the tolls was to be erected, the table being painted "in distinct and legible Black Letters, on a Board with a White Ground". A person would need to pay only one toll per day in the event of crossing the bridge more than once in 24 hours, except for stage coaches which would be expected to pay for every crossing.

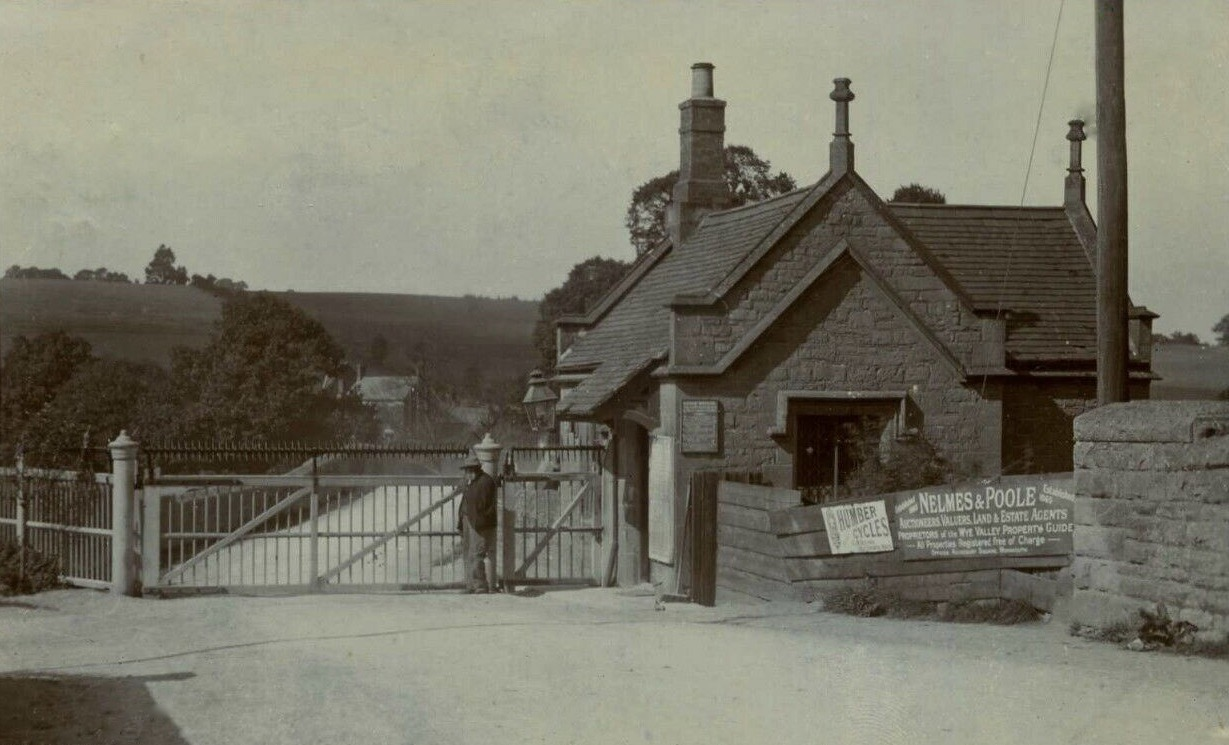
The tollhouse at Kerne Bridge, c1905

Exceptions to paying the tolls were the King and any members of the Royal Family or any person or vehicle on the King's business, the mail, soldiers and their animals and vehicles, and any vehicle carrying a prisoner.

The penalty for evading a toll was a fine not exceeding £5.

The Kerne Bridge Company was also empowered to erect a toll house as a residence and working place for a toll collector. The company built a two-roomed, stone toll house, on the upstream side of the left bank end of the bridge, where the toll gates were situated.

The Tolls were let by an annual auction, usually held at the Cross Keys Inn in Goodrich. The highest bidder would immediately have to pay down two months’ rent in advance and give security to the satisfaction of the company for payment of the remainder of the rent by monthly instalments in advance and also guarantee to perform the necessary duties of a toll collector, or employ others to carry out the work. The toll collectors were also known as pikemen or toll-gate keepers.

=== Kerne Bridge toll-gate keepers ===
- 1847 Cornelius Harding
- 1851 Cornelius Harding
- 1854 Catharine Meredith
- 1856 Mr Andrews
- 1871 John Reece
- 1881 James Hunt
- 1887 Joseph Homfray
- 1895 Alice Williams
- 1899 Mr Staddon
- 1901 William Hames
- 1911 William Hames
- 1914 George Spiller
- 1917 Amos Rayner
- 1922 John H Pascoe
- 1948 Samuel Wooley

=== Removal of the tolls ===
A call for the removal of the tolls on the bridge was made locally in November 1890 urging that Herefordshire County Council adopt the bridge and in September 1919 on the grounds that there was a grave scarcity of river crossings in the area and that local residents and tradespeople should not have to pay, in particular to reach Kerne Bridge railway station.

In 1928 talks were held between Herefordshire County Council and the Hereford Chamber of Commerce on the matter of removing tolls from the remaining toll bridges in the county, Kerne Bridge being one of only five bridges continuing to charge tolls.

Kerne Bridge was taken over from The Kerne Bridge Company by Herefordshire County Council in November 1947. In the following April Labour Member of Parliament Edwin Gooch asked the Minister of Transport in the House of Commons if it was the intention of Herefordshire County Council to free Kerne Bridge of tolls. The minister, Alfred Barnes, replied that he had authorised the council to continue the tolls until the end of June 1948, "by which time works required to make the approach roads suitable for unrestricted traffic should have been carried out".

The deadline of June was not met, but the tolls were removed in September 1948.

As it no longer served a purpose, the toll gate was removed in the mid-1950s and the toll house was demolished shortly afterwards. The remaining foundations of the house can still be found, though much overgrown. The original gate was preserved and installed at the entrance to a house in Hope Mansell, Herefordshire.

== Railway alterations ==
Alterations were made to the left-bank end of the bridge, destroying its symmetry, in 1873. It was raised onto an embankment to allow for a bridge over the newly built Ross and Monmouth Railway line. While the roadway and parapets extend at a level height, the downward incline of the original string course above the spandrels, and the old parapet, are visible below the later stonework.

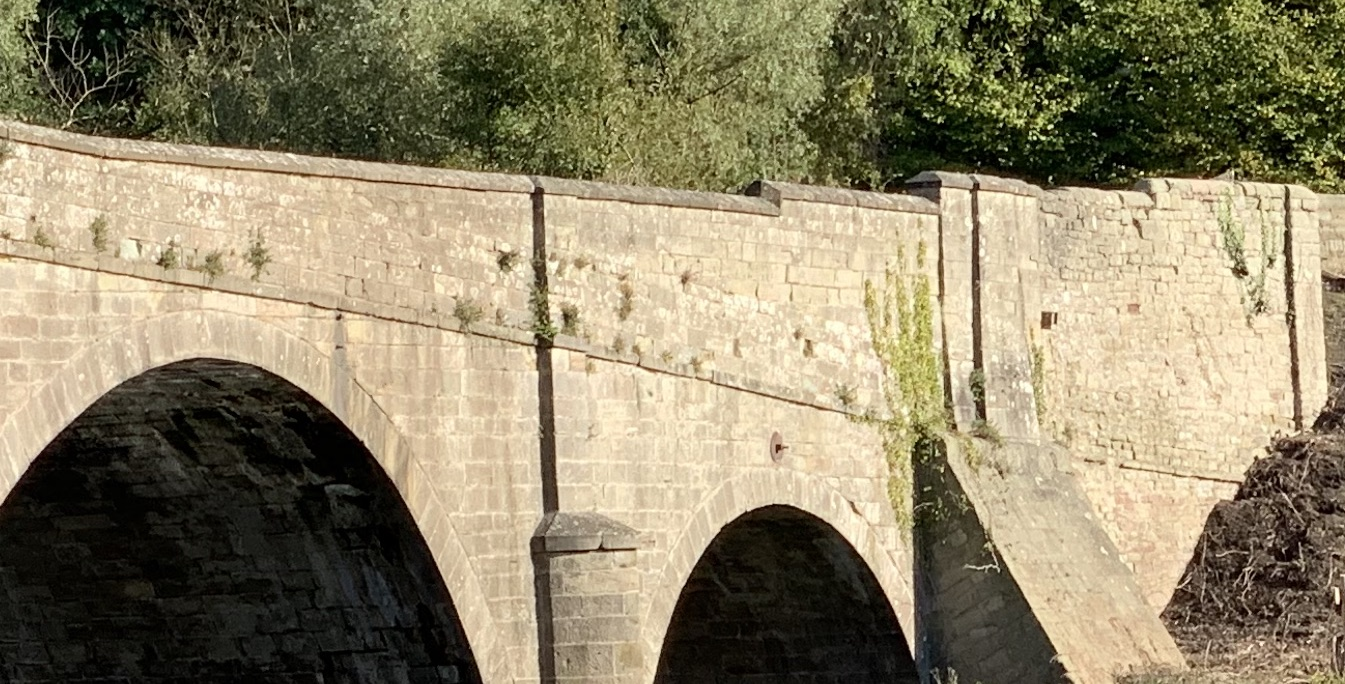
The original line of Kerne Bridge can be seen below the stonework of the 1873 alterations

Following closure of the railway in 1965 the railway bridge was mostly demolished and the land filled in but the embankment and alterations to Kerne Bridge's elevation were left in place.

== Second World War defences ==
In 1940, during the Second World War, Kerne Bridge was designated as a Centre of Resistance on the Western Command Stop Line No. 27, which followed the line of the River Wye from its mouth to Hay-on-Wye (Y Gelli Gandryll). As a result of this designation two defensive pillboxes - brick-built rifle positions with concrete bases and roofs and earth banked up to just below the rifle embrasures - were erected at the Goodrich end of the bridge in the period 1940–41.

One was located approximately 365 metres southwest of Kerne Bridge and about 135 metres south of the road; the other was positioned about 135 metres to the north, 275 metres west of the bridge and adjoining the road on the south side. They were recorded in July 1995 by 2 Military Intelligence Company and their record is believed to be the only one that exists. The pillboxes were demolished in 1997 as part of an agricultural land improvement scheme. The remaining rubble can still be found in the field adjacent to the bridge on the downstream side and irregularly deposited under the right-bank flood arch, where it obstructs the smooth flow of floodwater.

== Listing ==
As a building of national importance Kerne Bridge is designated a Scheduled Monument under the Ancient Monuments and Archeological Areas Act 1979. It is also listed Grade II for its special architectural and historic interest by the Historic Buildings and Monuments Commission for England. Under the law, Kerne Bridge's statutory listings warrant every effort to preserve it.

== The current use of Kerne Bridge ==
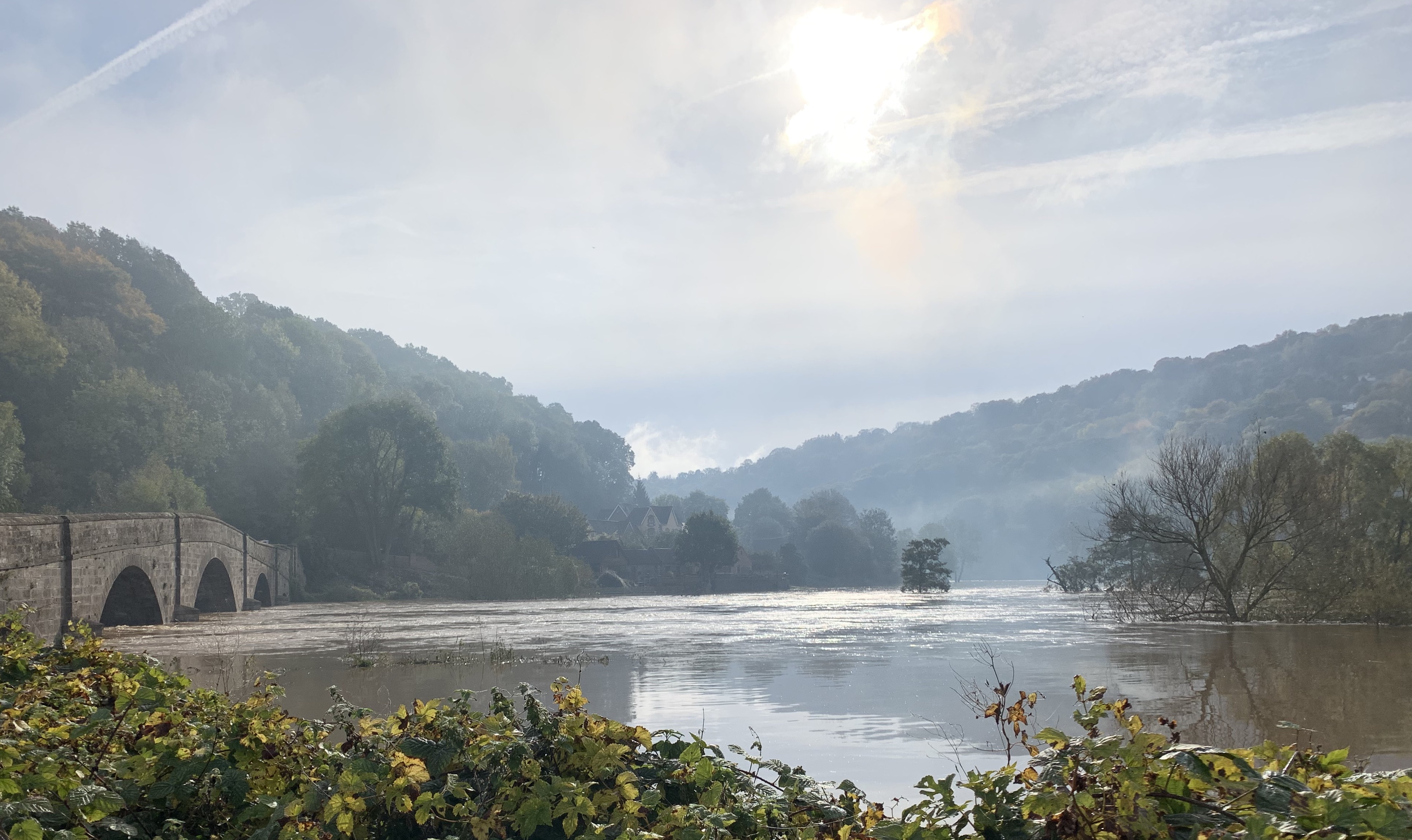
Floods at Kerne Bridge, autumn 2019

Kerne Bridge carries the B4229 towards the A40 from the junction with the B4234 in the hamlet of Kerne Bridge (whose name was adapted from the original one of The Kerne following the building of the bridge) on the River Wye's left bank. On the 21 river-miles between Monmouth to the south and Wilton to the north it is the only bridge able to sustain heavy goods traffic.

Such traffic travelling north on the B4234 towards Ross-on-Wye is diverted over the bridge towards the A40, except for local access.

Telecommunication cables cross the river via the bridge, beneath the roadway.

The location of the bridge's piers causes fast water and strong, converging currents and rapids immediately below the bridge, which can be a risk for canoeists and paddleboard users.

The bridge is the starting point for a fundraising plastic duck “duck race” staged every August Bank Holiday by the local community.

In March 2020, following the highest floods ever recorded on the Wye, Kerne Bridge was inspected by Herefordshire Council for damage that may have been caused to the foundations. Sonar, an underwater camera and a system of sensors using mobile bridge-surveying technology checked below the waterline and found no faults.
