= National Union of Agricultural and Allied Workers =

Former trade union of the United Kingdom

- Abbreviation: NUAW, NUAAW
- Merged into: Transport and General Workers' Union (Agricultural Section)
- Founded: 20 June 1906; 120 years ago
- Dissolved: 1982; 44 years ago
- Type: Trade union
- Headquarters: 308 Gray's Inn Road, London
- Location: United Kingdom
- Members: 70,800 (1946)
- General Secretary: George Edwards (first); Jack Boddy (last)
- President: George Nicholls (first); John Hose (last)
- Treasurer: Richard Winfrey (first)
- Publication: The Landworker
- Affiliations: Liberal Party (1906–1911), TUC, Labour Party

The National Union of Agricultural and Allied Workers (NUAAW) was a trades union representing farmworkers in the United Kingdom. The Union was founded in 1906 by trade union activist George Edwards. It was dissolved in 1982 when it merged into the Agricultural Section of the Transport and General Workers' Union.

In 1919, the union began publishing its journal The Landworker for its members. The journal remains in circulation, now published by the Agricultural Section of Unite the Union.

== History ==
=== Background ===
The late 19th century saw the rise of the labour movement in the United Kingdom. As the movement grew in the agricultural sector, conflict increased between three main groups:

- farmworkers, those farming on land on which they had no control over;
- tenant farmers, those renting the land to farm; and
- landowners, those owning the agricultural land.

In the early 1870s, British farmworkers began organising agricultural trade unions such as the Lincolnshire Labour League (later the Amalgamated Labour League), the Warwickshire Agricultural Labourers Union (later the National Agricultural Labourers' Union), and the Kent and Sussex Agricultural Labourers' Union. These unions initially achieved modest victories and growth, but a series of unsuccessful attempts to use collective action resulted in the decline and dissolution of early farmworkers' unions.

After the victory of the Liberal Party in the 1906 UK general election, many farm owners were angered by the rejection of the Conservative Party. Farm owners took revenge by sacking and evicting farmers who they suspected of radical views or of Liberal sympathies.

=== Formation and early years ===
In Norfolk, farm workers sought the help of Liberal counciller and trade union activist George Edwards. Edwards had previously been involved with union organising, but initially believed he was not equal to the task. After being convinced by his wife, Charlotte Edwards, George Edwards agreed to help establish a farmworker's union. In early June, Edwards began making use of his connections with union activists and Liberal members to raise funds. While some supporting Liberals expressed scepticism, two Liberal MPs — George Nicholls and Richard Winfrey — pledged to attend the founding the conference in addition their donations.

Through this, £10 in funds (equivalent to £1,051 in 2025) were raised. Although the cost of hosting a conference at the Angel Hotel in North Walsham was £11, Edwards himself funded the difference out of his own pocket. With this, the conference was held on 20 July 1906, with attending Norfolk agricultural workers voting to establish the Eastern Counties Agricultural Labourers & Small Holders Union.

George Edwards was the union's inaugural General Secretary, and was paid 13 shillings a week. Other leadership positions were held by George Nicholls, the union's first president, and Richard Winfrey, its first treasurer. The remainder of its executive committee consisted of J. Binder, J. Sage, William G. Codling, Herbert Day, J. Bly, C. Holman and J. Stibbins. Much of the union's early leadership were trade union moderates associated with the Liberal Party, and shyed away from any actions they considered militant. George Edwards himself described strike action as a horror, and often worked to prevent strikes.

The first three branches of the union were in Norfolk, One in St Faith's (former stronghold of Joseph Arch's old National Agricultural Labourers Union), one in Kenninghall, and one in Shipham. By the end of 1906, the union had established fifty-seven branches, and had a total of 1,600 members.

=== Split from the Liberals and affiliation to Labour ===
In March 1910, major strikes for better pay and conditions broke out in the Norfolk villages of Trunch, and spread to Knapton and St Faith's. At St Faith's, the 105 union men were on strike from May 1910 until February 1911 for 1 shilling a week extra. The strike action was unsuccessful, with many union members suspicious of the Liberal Party undermining them. As a result, at the Union's February 1911 Fakenham conference, the Union's members voted to affiliate to the Labour Party and the Trades Union Congress (TUC).

From 1911 until 1923, Walter Robert Smith was Honorary President of the Union.

The organisation changed its name in 1912 to the National Agricultural Labourers and Rural Workers Union (NALRWU), and in the same year officially registered as an Approved Society under the National Insurance Act 1911. Through a £500 grant by the TUC (equivalent to £49,882 in 2025), in 1913 the union was able to afford two salaried organisers. George Edwards stood down as General Secretary in 1913, then took up the post of President.

Growing interest in the NALRWU in some regards outstripped the ability of the Union's head office to keep up. One such case 1912 appeals to expand the union's activity into Flintshire in Wales turned down. Despite this, the NALRWU continued to grow. The Union entered Wales in Wrexham County joined with a campaign to strengthen its position in South-West Lancashire. When farmworkers in the area put forward demands for increased pay, they were denied and 2,000 workers went on strike. The strike lasted two weeks, and received the support of the Ormskirk branch of the National Union of Railwaymen

In 1920, the Union became the National Union of Agricultural Workers (NUAW).

=== Decline and amalgamation ===
The post-war period in Britain saw a decline in the number of farmworkers from 750,000 in 1946 to under 200,000 in 1976. Over the same period, the NUAW lost half of its membership despite strong recruitment centred on agricultural auxiliary workers—such as those working in the transport and retail of food and agricultural goods. In part reflecting this, in 1968 the Union took on its final name, the National Union of Agricultural and Allied Workers (NUAAW).

In 1982, the union was dissolved and became part of the already existing Agricultural Section of the Transport and General Workers' Union (TGWU). the TGWU itself merged with Amicus in 2007 to form Unite the Union. The NUAAW's contemporary successor is currently the Food, Drink and Agricultural Workers Section of Unite the Union, which operates the NUAAWs publication, The Landworker.

== Function and culture ==
The Union not only fought for worker's rights but also provide social activities.

The Union's stronghold was in Norfolk, Lincolnshire and Dorset with over 90% of agricultural labourers being in membership.

William "Bill" Holmes, NUAW General Secretary once told an audience of American trade unionists: "In many of our villages, a man who joins a trade union is worthy of the Victoria Cross that's won on a battlefield. In many villages he dare not be known to be a member of the union. But to be a branch secretary! That is to risk one's livelihood every day in the week".

The Dorset County Committee organises the annual Tolpuddle Martyrs festival along with the Trades Union Congress.

== Election results ==
The union worked closely with the Labour Party from its early years. Until 1945, it contributed election expenses to some candidates, but no ongoing expenses to those who won election, and therefore it is often not listed as a sponsor in this period.

Election	Constituency	Candidate	Votes	Percentage	Position
1918 general election	King's Lynn	Robert Barrie Walker	9,780	49.1	2
1918 general election	South Norfolk	George Edwards	6,536	35.7	2
1920 by-election	Horncastle	William Holmes	3,443	18.8	3
1920 by-election	South Norfolk	George Edwards	8,594	45.7	1
1921 by-election	Taunton	James Lunnon	8,290	38.9	2
1922 general election	King's Lynn	Robert Barrie Walker	8,683	32.7	2
1922 general election	South Norfolk	George Edwards	10,159	44.4	2
1922 general election	Stafford	Bill Holmes	7,672	41.1	2
1923 general election	Ormskirk	Robert Barrie Walker	9,388	47.0	2
1923 general election	South Norfolk	George Edwards	11,682	51.9	1
1924 general election	Ormskirk	Robert Barrie Walker	10,402	43.7	2
1924 general election	South Norfolk	George Edwards	11,376	44.5	2
1929 general election	East Norfolk	Bill Holmes	7,856	23.4	3
1931 general election	East Norfolk	Bill Holmes	6,562	20.2	2
1945 general election	Barkston Ash	Bert Hazell	24,322	49.9	2
1945 general election	Holland with Boston	Arthur Monks	21,263	44.1	2
1945 general election	North Norfolk	Edwin Gooch	17,753	58.7	1
1950 general election	Barkston Ash	Bert Hazell	18,626	42.5	2
1950 general election	North Norfolk	Edwin Gooch	19,790	48.0	1
1951 general election	Central Norfolk	John Lambley	17,270	44.1	2
1951 general election	North Norfolk	Edwin Gooch	21,067	50.3	1
1955 by-election	South Norfolk	John MacLennan Stewart	14,254	48.5	2
1955 general election	North Norfolk	Edwin Gooch	20,899	51.5	1
1955 general election	South Norfolk	John MacLennan Stewart	17,215	47.9	2
1955 general election	Worcester	Leonard Pike	19,508	43.2	2
1959 by-election	South West Norfolk	Albert Hilton	15,314	50.6	1
1959 general election	North Norfolk	Edwin Gooch	19,784	50.9	1
1959 general election	South Norfolk	John MacLennan Stewart	16,542	46.2	2
1959 general election	South West Norfolk	Albert Hilton	16,858	50.1	1
1959 general election	Taunton	Leonard Pike	16,182	35.3	2
1964 general election	North Norfolk	Bert Hazell	19,370	50.1	1
1964 general election	South West Norfolk	Albert Hilton	16,605	49.2	2
1964 general election	Taunton	Leonard Pike	16,619	36.2	2
1966 general election	North Norfolk	Bert Hazell	20,796	50.9	1
1970 general election	Ludlow	David Nagington	12,800	31.7	2
1970 general election	North Norfolk	Bert Hazell	19,903	44.7	2
1974 Oct general election	Sheffield Brightside	Joan Maynard	18,108	49.7	1
1979 general election	Sheffield Brightside	Joan Maynard	25,672	68.5	1

== Leadership ==
=== General Secretaries ===
1906: George Edwards
1913: Robert Barrie Walker
1928: Bill Holmes
1944: Alf Dann
1953: Harold Collison
1969: Reg Bottini
1978: Jack Boddy

=== Presidents ===
1906: George Nicholls
1913: George Edwards
1923: Bill Holmes
1928: Edwin Gooch
1966: Bert Hazell
1978: John Hose

== See also ==
- Trade unions in the United Kingdom
- List of Transport and General Workers' Union amalgamations
- Solidarity Across Land Trades – a modern-day agricultural trade union

== Works cited ==
- Newby, Howard (1987). Country life: a social history of rural England. London: Weidenfeld and Nicolson. ISBN 978-0-297-79063-1.
- Groves, Reg (1981). Sharpen the Sickle!:The History of the Farm Workers' Union. Merlin Press. ISBN 978-0-85036-695-2.
- Pretty, David A. (1989). The rural revolt that failed: farm workers' trade unions in Wales, 1889-1950. University of Wales Press. ISBN 978-0-7083-1024-3.
