= George Mitchell (trade unionist) =

British stonemason

George Mitchell (6 February 1827 – 24 January 1901) was a British stonemason, who became prominent in the National Agricultural Labourers' Union.

Mitchell was born in Montacute in Somerset and began working when he was five years old, as a crow scarer. He later became a stonemason, following his father's trade, and proved highly successful. In time he moved to London, and began trading in marble, eventually becoming wealthy.

Despite his wealth and location, Mitchell remained sympathetic to the agricultural labourers he had worked with in his youth. Initially, he was suspicious of trade unions, but he became enthusiastic after discovering that many of their leaders shared his Methodist faith. As a result, he was enthusiastic when the National Agricultural Labourers' Union (NALU) was established, and in June 1872 he was a founder of its Somerset District.

Mitchell wrote numerous letters and pamphlets supportive of the union, usually under the pen name "One From the Plough". In 1874, he wrote The Skeleton at the Plough: or the Poor Farm Labourers of the West, which included his autobiography. In 1877, he organised a mass meeting at Ham Hill, attended by 20,000 people. It became an annual occasion, running until 1892.

Mitchell served as a trustee of the union and donated huge amounts of his own money to it, totaling around £20,000, leading to his bankruptcy. By 1884, he was concerned that he was unable to obtain information on how the union was spending its funds, and as result, he refused to allow any of the union's £6,000 reserves to be spent. This upset the union's president, Joseph Arch, who ensured that Mitchell was voted out as a trustee.

Mitchell also took part in political activism, and in 1882 was elected to the London School Board, representing Chelsea. Despite his differences with Arch, Mitchell was selected by the union as a Prospective Parliamentary Candidate for South Somerset at the 1885 general election, although he did not ultimately stand. By 1888, the union was in decline, and Mitchell was calling for an independent investigation into its finances. From 1890 until 1892, he led an effort to found a new union, the Somerset and West of England Farm Labourers' Union, although little came of it.

Mitchell spent the remainder of the 1890s trying to rebuild his marble business. He died early in 1901, at home in Shepherd's Bush.
