= Henry Taylor (trade unionist) =

British trade union leader

Henry Taylor (1844 – 1919) was a British trade union leader.

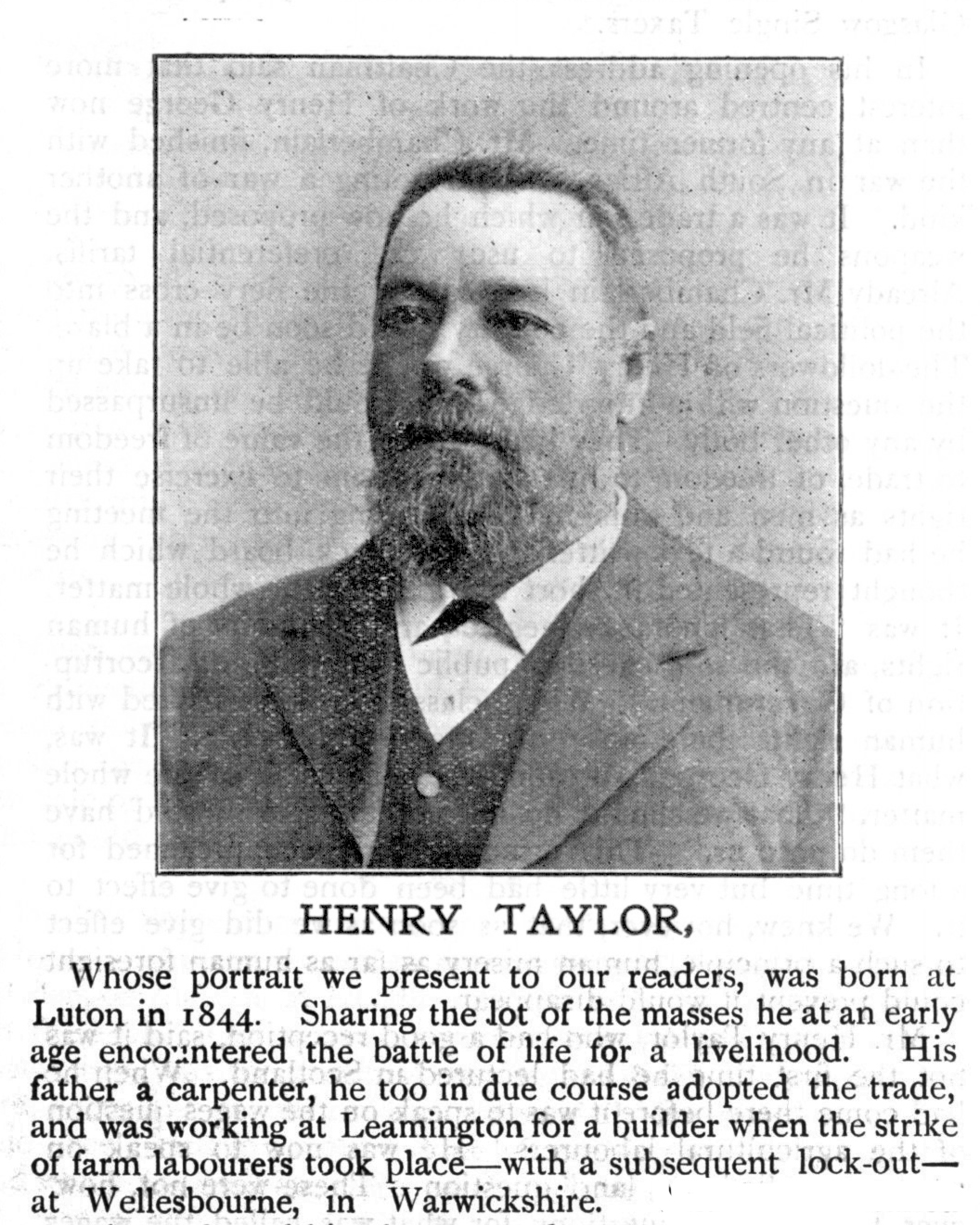
Henry Taylor c.1903

Born in Luton in 1844, Taylor became a carpenter, and joined the Amalgamated Society of Carpenters and Joiners (ASC&J). While based in London, he was elected as a branch secretary, and was trained in union administration by Robert Applegarth.

Taylor was supportive of the National Agricultural Labourers' Union (NALU), which was founded in Warwickshire in 1872, and was elected as its first general secretary. He secured the backing of the London Trades Council for the new union. Late in 1873, he set off for New Zealand, accompanying some agricultural labourers who wished to emigrate, and the following year he took a similar trip to Canada. While on this second trip, J. E. Matthew Vincent, editor of the union's newspaper, falsely claimed that Taylor was embezzling union funds. Taylor won a resulting legal case, and Vincent left the union.

Taylor represented the union to the Trades Union Congress (TUC) on several occasions, and in 1875 he was narrowly elected to the Parliamentary Committee of the TUC.

In 1876, Taylor resigned as the general secretary of NALU, in order to become an honorary emigration agent in Victoria, and was also appointed as a special commissioner for South Australia. On stepping down, he was given 100 sovereigns, and letters of thanks from several Members of Parliament were read out. He later revealed that he had become disillusioned with the president, Joseph Arch, and in 1879 wrote a letter arguing that Arch should not be given any administrative responsibility.

Taylor married twice and died at Adelaide, South Australia in 1919.

Trade union offices
| Preceded by New position | General Secretary of the National Agricultural Labourers' Union; 1872–1876 | Succeeded by Robert Collier |
