= Howard Evans (journalist) =

British Radical and Nonconformist journalist

Howard Evans (1839–1915) was a British Radical and Nonconformist journalist. A. J. A. Morris has called Evans "an energetic, able journalist with pronounced nonconformist sympathies".

== Youth ==
During his youth there was still a religious test for Oxbridge. One had to conform to the Thirty-Nine Articles of the Church of England to study there. As he wrote in his autobiography:

I wanted to go on and compete for an Oxford scholarship, but my father told me that if I wanted to go forward then I must conform to the Established Church. As he had brought me up to regard Cromwell and Milton and Bunyan as the great heroes of the Primitive Apostolic and Puritan faith, he was not surprised that I answered ‘Never! Never!’ Ever since then I have done my best to avenge that wrong, and have taken a keen delight in standing by other victims of priestly arrogance, which does the devil's work in the outraged name of the God of all goodness.

Evans wrote in 1878 that "I believe firmly that in politics as well as religion God has his own elect chosen out from the rest of the world to be the pioneers of progress".

His father introduced him to the Chartist movement, and he was soon involved in the Reform League. He led a group during the Hyde Park demonstrations.

== Agricultural reform ==
Joseph Arch has claimed that Evans "was the real author of the" Allotments Extension Act 1882. Evans travelled the country for the National Agricultural Labourers' Union and believed that something must be done. He got a Bill drawn up and Sir Charles Dilke offered to introduce it into the House of Commons. However the Charity Commissioners did not like the Act, as Evans wrote: "The tricks resorted to by some of the trustees are simply infamous. In some cases they have let the land on a long lease so as to evade the Act; in others they have, contrary to law, charged exorbitant rents; in others they have, contrary to law, refused to let except to farm labourers, and sometimes only to farm labourers who are householders; in others they have ignored the Act altogether; in others they have illegally demanded half a year's rent in advance". Arch claimed that "I must say that Evans worked like a slave over this Act, and he wrote on it in our paper, and gave extracts from the Charity Digest".

Evans also wrote a poem entitled ‘The Franchise’.

There's a man who represents our shire

In the Parliament House, they say,

Returned by the votes of farmer and squire

And others who bear the sway;

And farmer and squire, when laws are made,

Are pretty well cared for thus;

But the County Member, I'm much afraid,

Has but little care for us.

So we ought to vote, deny it who can,
'Tis the right of an honest Englishman.

Whenever a tyrant country beak

Has got us beneath his thumb,

For Justice then he ought sure to speak

But the County Member is dumb.

Whenever the rights of labour need

A vote on a certain day,

The County Member is sure to plead

And vote the contrary way.

So we ought to vote, deny it who can,
'Tis the right of an honest Englishman.

We ask for the vote, and we have good cause

To make it our firm demand;

For ages the rich have made all the laws,

And have robbed the poor of their land.

The Parliament men false weights have made,

So that Justice often fails;

And to make it worse, The Great Unpaid

Must always fiddle the scales.

So we ought to vote, deny it who can,
'Tis the right of an honest Englishman.

== Journalism ==
He was invited to become editor of the reform magazine English Labourer. He was later given the editorship of The Echo, which for some time was the only ½ d newspaper in London.

== Pacifism ==
Introduced to the Peace Society at a young age, Evans was a committed promoter of disarmament and of peaceful dispute resolution between countries. For 38 years until his death he was, at various times, secretary, vice-chairman and treasurer of the Workmen's Peace Association, which became the International Arbitration League. Known as W Randal Cremer's right-hand man, he continued to support and promote peace through the League, and the Inter-Parliamentary Union after Cremer's death.

== Selected publications ==
- Our Old Nobility Volume 1, Volume 2 (London, 1879)
- Sir Randal Cremer: His Life and Work (1909)
- Radical Fights for Forty Years (London, 1913).
