= Uzzell =

Uzzell is a surname. Notable people with the surname include:

- Harry Uzzell (1883–1960), Welsh international rugby union player
- Janeen Uzzell, American mechanical engineer and business executive
- John Uzzell (born 1959), British footballer
- Kevin Uzzell, British pocket billiards player
- Ruth Uzzell (1880–1945), British trade unionist
