= George Rix =

George Rix may refer to:

- George Rix (bishop)
- George Rix (trade unionist)
