= Dry Arch Bridge (Goodrich, Herefordshire) =

Bridge in England

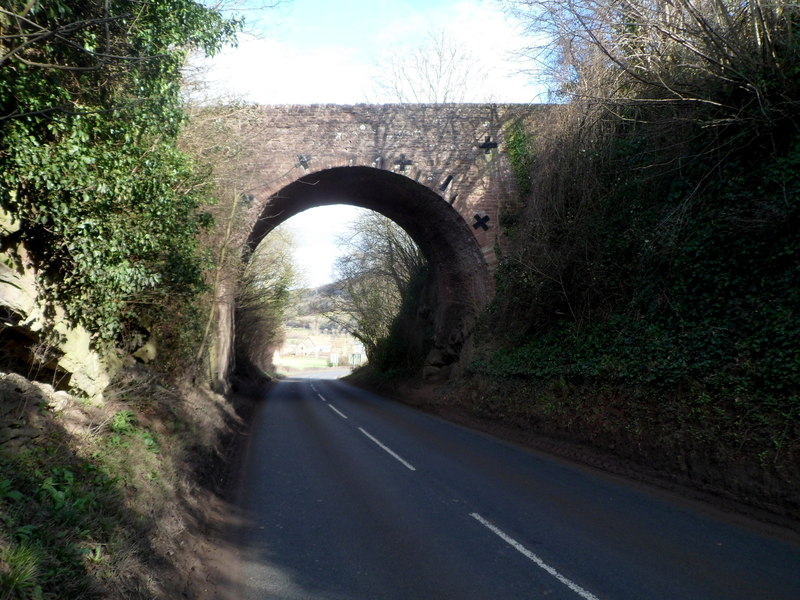
- Coordinates: 51°52′12″N 2°37′06″W
- OS grid reference: SO 57532 19222
- Carries: Goodrich to Welsh Bicknor road
- Crosses: B4229, Kerne Bridge to Goodrich road
- Locale: Goodrich, Herefordshire
- Owner: Herefordshire County Council
- Heritage status: Scheduled Monument

Characteristics
- No. of spans: 1

History
- Opened: 1828

Location
- Interactive map of Dry Arch Bridge (Goodrich, Herefordshire)

Dry Arch Bridge in Goodrich, Herefordshire, England, built in 1828, is one of the earliest examples of a bridge built specifically to carry a minor road across a more major one without the need for a road junction. It was constructed to carry the existing old road between Goodrich and Welsh Bicknor over a cutting for a new-built road connecting Kerne Bridge with Goodrich. It was built with a single span, using local sandstone, at least some of which came from the cutting beneath the bridge. It was also constructed to allow pedestrians to cross from one road to the other three-dimensionally without a lengthy diversion.

== History ==
An Act of Parliament in May 1825 allowed for the building of a road bridge over the River Wye at the hamlet now called Kerne Bridge but then known as The Kerne, in Herefordshire. The bridge was to connect the 1749 turnpike from Ross-on-Wye to The Kerne (now the B4234), on the left bank of the river, to Goodrich on the right bank. The Act required a new road to be constructed, leading from the bridge and past Flanesford Priory, to Goodrich.

The Kerne Bridge Company, set up to erect and maintain the bridge, was also responsible for building the road to Goodrich. In 1825 the company advertised for "persons willing to contract" for making the road. The company advertised again in June 1827 for tenders for building the new road following the plans, sections and specifications laid out by the company.

== The building of the bridge ==
Work started soon after June 1827. To avoid a steep inclination for horse-drawn traffic the road was cut through the ridge between Coppet Hill and Goodrich which forms part of the west side of the Wye Valley. The consequence of this was the new road passed east to west beneath the lane which travelled along the ridge between Goodrich to the north and Welsh Bicknor to the south.

The bridge takes the form of a single, semicircular arch. It was built of the local sandstone, the rocks being of the red sandstone beds of the Brownstones Formation, the highest part of the Lower Devonian. Some of the stone from which the bridge is built was from the spoil extracted when the cutting beneath the bridge was being made. This stone is thought to have been used mainly as rubble infill. Both abutments were built onto the prominent large sandstone rocks which are found in the area. The bridge parapets are topped with semicircular coping stones.

Since the bridge was built remedial works have been carried out on the structure. Anchor plates are visible above the arch on each side, connected to tie rods, for structural reinforcement against lateral bowing.

The road which passes beneath the bridge is now designated the B4229.

== Pedestrians ==
There is a flight of 33 steps which connect the upper road with the lower road. They allow pedestrian traffic to cross from one road to the other three-dimensionally without a lengthy diversion.

== Scheduling ==
On 8 May 1975 the bridge was listed as a Scheduled Monument. In its "Reasons for Designation", Historic England notes that the bridge "may actually be one of the earliest examples of a bridge specifically built to carry a minor road across a more major one without the interruption of the busier road by a road junction." They go on to note that it "presumably set the scene for all major road traffic intersections which were to follow and as such represents an early example of congestion alleviation on the road network which is so pivotal to modern road travel." Historic England also points out that Herefordshire County Council has described the bridge as being "an excellent example of very early vehicle grade separation" or a simple "fly-over".

== Recent history ==
In 2018 the north wall of the cutting became unstable causing a rock fall onto the road. In repair, missing sections of strata were supported by sandbags and cement spray and wire mesh was fixed to bolts in the bank. The work was completed and the road completely reopened in April 2019.
