= Bert Hazell =

British politician (1907–2009)

Bertie Hazell CBE

Member of Parliament North Norfolk
- In office 15 October 1964 – 18 June 1970
- Preceded by: Edwin Gooch
- Succeeded by: Ralph Howell

Personal details
- Born: 18 April 1907 Attleborough, Norfolk, England
- Died: 11 January 2009 (aged 101) York, England
- Party: Labour
- Spouse: Dora Anna Barham (m. 1936; died 1987)
- Children: 1
- Occupation: President of the National Union of Agricultural Workers
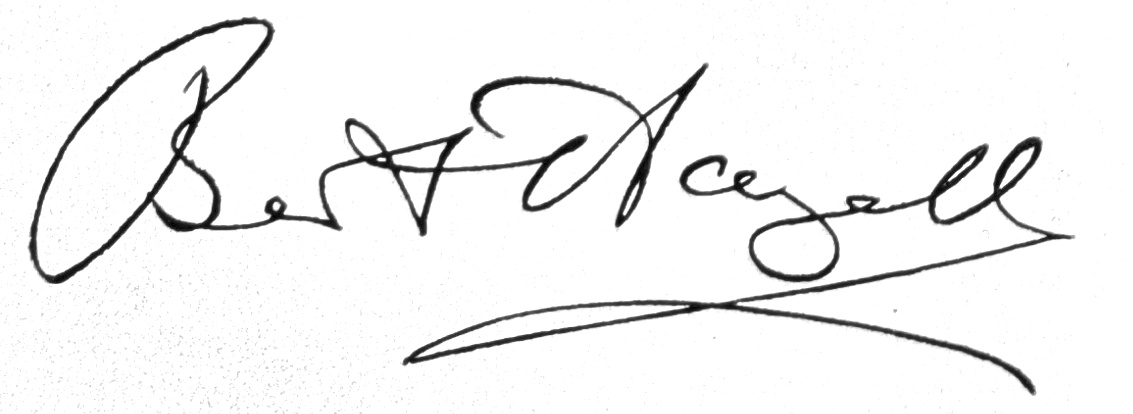
- Signature

Bertie Hazell, CBE (18 April 1907 – 11 January 2009), also known as Bert Hazell, was a British Labour Party politician and trade union activist.

== Life and career ==
The son of a Norfolk farm worker, he left school at 14 to work on a farm in Wymondham, where his duties included scaring crows. When agricultural wages slumped after the First World War sparking the Norfolk farm workers' strike in 1923, Hazell became active in the National Union of Agricultural Workers. He worked as a district organiser for the NUAW, 1937–1964.

Hazell unsuccessfully contested the safe Tory parliamentary seat of Barkston Ash in Yorkshire in the 1945 and 1950 elections, before returning to Norfolk to help North Norfolk Labour MP Edwin Gooch. In 1945 he came within 116 votes of victory in Barkston Ash.

He was elected Member of Parliament (MP) for North Norfolk in 1964 by just 53 votes. The constituency was unusual in being an agricultural seat electing Labour MPs since 1945, owing to a history of organised agricultural trade unionism and a working-class rural Labour vote in Norfolk at the time, very atypical of the rest of the country. He was re-elected in 1966, when his majority was 737 votes. He lost his seat at the 1970 general election to the Conservative Ralph Howell who held the seat for 27 years.

As president of the NUAW for 10 years until he retired in 1978, Hazell devoted nearly 60 years to the cause of agricultural workers. He had a lengthy career in the health service including as chair of York Health Authority in the 1980s.

Hazell was made an MBE for services to agriculture in 1946 and a CBE for services as chairman of the regional board for industry in 1962. Both he and his wife were members of the Methodist Church.

Having reached his 100th birthday in April 2007, he was the third longest-living MP in British history; only Theodore Cooke Taylor (102) and Ronald Atkins (104) have lived longer. On 6 November 2008 he overtook Lord Shinwell's record as the longest-living former MP of recent times. Upon Hazell's death, James Allason became the oldest living former MP.

Hazell died on 11 January 2009, aged 101.

== See also ==
- Records of members of parliament of the United Kingdom

Parliament of the United Kingdom
Preceded by Edwin Gooch	Member of Parliament for North Norfolk; 1964–1970	Succeeded by Ralph Howell
Trade union offices
Preceded by Edwin Gooch	President of the National Union of Agricultural and Allied Workers; 1966–1978	Succeeded by John Hose
