= Coventry Herald =

The Coventry Herald, Coventry Herald and Observer or the Coventry Herald and Free Press was a newspaper that was established in 1808 by Alderman Nathaniel Merridew, a ribbon warehouseman and Congregationalist, in Coventry, England, and ran in print until 1940.

== Coventry Herald (1808–1830) ==
Merridew's Whig and Dissenting views were initially represented by the newspaper and it was the recognized publication of the Liberal party in Coventry. The newspaper's control was given to Alderman Nathanial's third son Henry upon his death. Originally just the Coventry Herald, a political disagreement in 1828 with the Liberal party led to a competing newspaper, the Coventry Observer to be formed in 1828.

== Coventry Herald and Observer (1830–1863) ==
These papers were later merged into a single paper under Henry in 1830. Henry's business failed and he sold to John Turner (1842), and later opened a boarding hotel in Boulogne-sur-Mer. Successive owners include Charles Bray (1846) While owned by Bray, the newspaper published some of the earliest prose writing of George Eliot.

== Coventry Herald and Free Press (1863–1940) ==
The newspaper changed names again in 1863, after merging with the Free Press and Midland Express in 1863. During the 1860s, it was owned by Matthew Vincent, who claimed that he turned down an offer of £30,000 from Joseph Chamberlain to purchase it, because Chamberlain would have changed the political alignment of the newspaper. In 1914 they absorbed the Coventry Times. The paper stopped publication in 1940.

== Archives ==
Historical copies of the Coventry Herald, dating back to 1824, are available to search and view in digitized form at The British Newspaper Archive.

== The Coventry Observer (2014–present) ==
The Coventry Observer is a local weekly newspaper published by Bullivant Media.
