= Herbert Witard =

British Socialist Politician

Herbert Edward Witard (8 October 1873 – April 1954) was a British socialist politician.

Born in Clare, Suffolk, Witard grew up in Norwich. When he was six, his father died, and the family fell into poverty. He began working at the age of ten, selling newspapers on a street corner after early-morning schooling. He left school two years later and worked as a cabin boy on a fishing boat operating out of Great Yarmouth. At the age of fourteen, he returned to Norwich and learnt shoemaking, gradually building himself a reputation as one of the best in the city. He decided, at some point, to walk to London with two friends, and worked there for a short while, but soon returned to Norwich.

In 1894, Witard was a founder of the Norwich branch of the Independent Labour Party (ILP). He soon became prominent in the party, and in 1897 spent time in London as secretary of Ramsay MacDonald's campaign committee for the London County Council elections. He was elected to Norwich City Council in 1903, the first ILP councillor in the city, and was soon joined by colleagues. He stood down in 1907 to take a post as the full-time organiser of Blackburn ILP, then in 1908 became the organiser of the party's Eastern Region, also serving on the party's National Administrative Council.

Witard became president of Norwich ILP in 1910, and was soon back on the council. The ILP was affiliated to the Labour Party, and Witard stood unsuccessfully for it in Norwich at the 1918 and 1922 UK general elections. He was elected as an alderman in 1922, and in 1927 as Lord Mayor of Norwich. Previous Lord Mayors had been wealthy and were expected to pay for entertainment from their own funds, but as Witard could not afford this, for the first time, an allowance was given for mayoral entertainment.

In 1936, Witard claimed to have seen a sea serpent while walking on the beach at Eccles, Norfolk, with Charles Ammon and Archibald Gossling. He remained on the council until 1951, when he stood down. He died three years later.

Party political offices
| Preceded by Harry Dubery | London Division representative on the National Administrative Council of the Independent Labour Party; 1918–1920 | Succeeded by Clifford Allen |
| Preceded by Harry Dubery | Eastern Division representative on the National Administrative Council of the Independent Labour Party; 1918–1922 | Succeeded by Percy F. Pollard |
