= Ethel Gooch =

British teacher & politician (1887–1953)

- Born: Ethel Banham; 12 December 1887; Wisbech, Cambridgeshire, England
- Died: 6 February 1953 (aged 65); Wymondham, Norfolk, England
- Occupations: Teacher and politician
- Known for: Being Wymondham's first woman councillor
- Movement: Labour movement
- Spouse: Edwin Gooch (married 1914)
- Children: Michael Edwin Gooch (born 1923)

Ethel Gooch (née Banham; 12 December 1887 – 6 February 1953) was a British teacher and politician. She was the first woman councillor of the town of Wymondham, Norfolk, and the first woman to chair its urban district council. On her death, she was called "one of the pioneers of the Labour movement in rural Norfolk".

== Life ==
Ethel Banham was born in Wisbech, Cambridgeshire, into a Primitive Methodist family. She was the daughter of Charles Dawson Banham, a gasworks manager. On 26 December 1914, she married Labour politician and trade unionist, Edwin George Gooch, at the Primitive Methodist chapel in Wymondham. They had one son, Michael Edwin Gooch, born in 1923.

In 1918, Edwin Gooch helped to found the South Norfolk Labour Party in Church Street, Wymondham. Both he and Ethel were active in the Labour Party, as well as serving as Justices of the Peace.

Ethel became Wymondham Council's first woman member in 1935, and its first woman chairman in 1951. She was also a member of the Minister's Central Housing Advisory Committee and the Rural Housing Committee, as well as being an alderman of Norfolk County Council. Alun Howkins, author of Edwin Gooch's entry in the Oxford Dictionary of National Biography, described Ethel as "a formidable and important figure in the history of Norfolk Labour politics".

== Death and legacy ==
Ethel Gooch died in Wymondham on 6 February 1953. The Daily Herald described her as "one of the pioneers of the Labour movement in rural Norfolk". A street in Wymondham, Ethel Gooch Road, was later named for her.

In 2013, the Wymondham Heritage Museum staged an exhibition about Ethel Gooch. In 2017, Gooch was remembered with a historical tour around Wymondham's town centre.
