= Harry Dubery =

British activist

Harry Dubery was a British labour movement activist.

== Career ==
Dubery worked as a postman and became active in the Fawcett Association. From 1911 until 1918, he was the editor of the union's journal, The Post. He was also prominent in the Independent Labour Party (ILP), serving on its National Administrative Committee as the representative for London. Within the ILP, he was part of a minority which supported the UK's involvement in World War I, although he opposed conscription. Despite this, he remained a prominent figure in the party throughout the war, and was one of its delegates to the Allied Socialist Conference held in London in 1917.

In 1917, Dubery became the full-time secretary of a new Federation of Post Office Supervising Trade Unions, and also general secretary of the Post Office Controlling Officers' Association. He resigned from the ILP, and became labour adviser to the National Association of Employers and Employed. In 1921, he resigned from his trade union posts, but continued with the NAEE on a salary of £1000 per year, promoting the resolution of labour disputes without industrial action.

Party political offices
Preceded by Harry Snell	London Division representative on the Independent Labour Party National Administrative Council; 1911–1918	Succeeded by Herbert Witard
Preceded by Bill Holmes	Eastern Division representative on the Independent Labour Party National Administrative Council; 1916–1918	Succeeded by Herbert Witard
