= Robert Barrie Walker =

British trade unionist

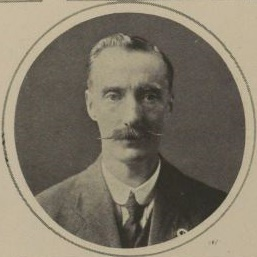
Walker in 1920

Robert Barrie Walker (13 October 1878 – 25 August 1961) was a British trade unionist.

Born in Carstairs, Lanarkshire to a family of farm workers, Walker initially worked on the railways, before moving to England. He enlisted in the British Army and served in the Second Boer War. When demobbed, he became involved in trade union organising in the English Midlands, for National Union of Agricultural Workers (NUAW), soon moving to join its head office, in Fakenham.

Active in the Labour Party, Walker stood unsuccessfully in King's Lynn at the 1918 and 1922 general elections, then at Ormskirk in 1923 and 1924. He was asked to stand at the 1923 Ludlow by-election, but declined, correctly judging that the party had little support in the area.

Walker was elected as general secretary of the NUAW in 1912 and pursued a radical, socialist programme. In 1918, he moved the union's headquarters from Fakenham to London in an attempt to broaden its national appeal, but this initially had little success, and removed him from direct influence in the union's activities in the county. He achieved a national profile with the Trades Union Congress, being elected to its Parliamentary Committee in 1917, then serving as president in 1921–22.

In 1928, Walker stood down as general secretary of the NUAW in controversial circumstances. Although the union officially stated that he had retired on age grounds, it was hinted that he had been forced out on ground of financial impropriety. He subsequently emigrated to Australia.

He died in Perth in 1961.

Trade union offices
Preceded by George Edwards	General Secretary of the National Union of Agricultural Workers; 1912–1928	Succeeded by Bill Holmes
Preceded by New position	Agriculture Group representative on the General Council of the TUC; 1921–1928	Succeeded by Bill Holmes
Preceded by Edward L. Poulton	President of the Trades Union Congress; 1922	Succeeded by Joe Williams
Preceded by Edward L. Poulton and Herbert Smith	Trades Union Congress representative to the American Federation of Labour; 1923; With: William C. Robinson	Succeeded by Charlie Cramp and Alonzo Swales
