= Matthew Vincent =

British newspaper editor and trade union official

James Edward Matthew Vincent FRGS (1837 –12 March 1910) was a British newspaper editor and trade union official.

Born in Dorset, Vincent was educated at Christ's Hospital, and then undertook an apprenticeship with the Sherborne Journal. In 1857, he married Anna Maria Witty, the daughter of the inventor Richard Whitty, and relocated to Warwickshire, where he became the owner and editor of the Coventry Herald. He later claimed that he turned down an offer of £30,000 from Joseph Chamberlain to purchase the paper, because Chamberlain would have changed the political alignment of the newspaper. In the late 1860s and early 1870s, he founded various journals aligned with the Liberal Party, culminating in the Royal Leamington Chronicle, which gave considerable space to supporting agricultural labourers.

Vincent was interested in land reform, and when in 1872 the National Agricultural Labourers' Union (NALU) was founded in Leamington Spa, he became a keen activist, organising its first national conference, and winning election as its treasurer. In July, he established the Labourers' Union Chronicle as its newspaper, although the paper was owned and controlled by him.

Early in 1875, Vincent resigned as treasurer of NALU, unhappy that the union had withdrawn support from some locked out labourers. He had also fallen out with the union's general secretary, Henry Taylor, who believed that Vincent was altering reports which had been sent to him for publication in the paper. In the summer, he founded the rival National Farm Labourers' Union, which promoted the establishment of allotments and smallholdings, and opposed strikes.

The new union struggled, and by 1877 Vincent was suffering with poor health. He emigrated to Australia and spent the next decade visiting all the regions with European settlers. He attempted to reorganise the sugar industry in Queensland, and then found work as chief commissioner for the Chaffey Brothers, returning to England in the late 1880s. He wrote the widely-circulated book, The Australian Irrigation Colonies, to promote British workers moving to Australia to work for the Chaffeys.

Trade union offices
Preceded by New position	Treasurer of the National Agricultural Labourers' Union; 1872–1875	Succeeded by F. S. Attenborough
