= George M. Ball =

British politician and trade unionist

George Mason Ball (1832 – June 1903) was a British politician and trade unionist.

Born in Ashby, Lincolnshire, Ball worked as a farm labourer. When the National Agricultural Labourers' Union (NALU) was founded in 1872, he was immediately enthusiastic, joining up and becoming the delegate for his district. This brought him to national attention, and he travelled the country giving speeches in support of the union. In 1875, he moved to Witham in Essex to organise the union's important North Essex district. He was also elected as the union's vice-president, and served on the Parliamentary Committee of the Trades Union Congress.

By 1877, NALU was in decline, and focusing more of its resources on political campaigns. Ball proposed that a Land Law Reform League be formed, and this was agreed, several prominent politicians taking leading roles in it. Ball took employment with the Liberal Party, devoting himself to its cause for many years, from 1883 as the agent of the associated Allotment and Small Holdings Association. At the 1892 United Kingdom general election, he was its candidate for Rye, focusing his campaign on encouraging agricultural labourers to vote. He was not elected.
