= Free Breakfast Table =

Demand of British working-class Liberalism

The Free Breakfast Table was the demand of British working-class Liberalism from the 1860s to the early twentieth century. It entailed abolishing duties on basic foodstuffs as these were indirect taxes and therefore regressive. It was as a result of the abolition of Protectionism.

The phrase is said to have been coined by the Radical MP John Bright. There was also a campaigning organisation called the Free Breakfast Table Association.

The National Agricultural Labourers Union held the Free Breakfast Table as "an article of faith" and the idea helped to safeguard Liberal Party support in rural areas after the Representation of the People Act 1884.

In 1891 the National Liberal Federation convened in Newcastle and adopted the Newcastle Programme, which included a pledge in favour of the Free Breakfast Table.

The first Labour Chancellor of the Exchequer, Philip Snowden, produced his first Budget in 1924 and claimed it went "far to realize the cherished radical idea of a free breakfast table". Snowden had lowered duties on tea, coffee, cocoa, chicory and sugar. As late as 1938 a Labour MP (George Ridley) was condemning the Conservatives' budget due to its "harsh and inhuman" increase on the tax on tea and thereby betraying the ideal of the free breakfast table.
