= George Rix (trade unionist) =

British trade union leader and politician

George Rix (1828 – 1918) was a British trade union leader and politician.

Born in East Dereham in Norfolk, Rix became a shopkeeper. He was a supporter of the National Agricultural Labourers' Union (NALU), and was elected as its district secretary. However, in 1878, he began arguing that, due to falling membership, the union needed to cut costs. This led him to fall out with the union's president, Joseph Arch, and Rix soon left the union.

Rix founded the rival Norfolk Federal Union, based in Dereham, becoming its general secretary. The union retained a significant membership while NALU was in rapid decline. In 1889 Rix was elected to Norfolk County Council, and due to poor health, he reduced the amount of time he devoted to the union. Members complained that, by focusing on the council, he was too closely associated with landowners, and the union fell apart in the ensuing disputes, most districts becoming part of the Norfolk and Norwich Amalgamated Labourers' Union.
