= Jack Boddy =

British trade union leader

Jack Richard Boddy (23 August 1922 – 9 March 2004) was a British trade union leader.

Born in Norwich to a Quaker family, Boddy was educated at the City of Norwich School. He hoped to become a veterinary surgeon, but his parents could not afford the tuition, so he instead became a cowhand on a local farm. He also became active in the National Union of Agricultural and Allied Workers (NUAAW), and in 1943 he was promoted to become farm supervisor.

In 1953, Boddy was appointed as the NUAAW's full-time organiser for Lincolnshire. In 1960, he moved to become the Norfolk district organiser, serving until 1978, when he was elected as the union's general secretary, defeating Arthur Leary, Len Pike and Jim Watts in a keenly-fought contest. In contrast to his predecessors, he was seen as a left-winger. On taking over, he realised that the union was close to financial collapse. He initially focused on recruiting new members while cutting costs without laying off staff. However, these measures were insufficient, and he negotiated a merger with the Transport and General Workers' Union; although this was highly controversial, it was ultimately approved by members, with a landslide majority.

During this period, Boddy was also active in local politics, representing the Labour Party on Norfolk County Council. He also served on the General Council of the Trades Union Congress from 1978 until 1983, on the European Economic and Social Committee, and on the Industrial Injuries Advisory Committee.

The merger took place in 1982, and Boddy became the Group Secretary of the TGWU's new Agricultural and Allied Workers Trade Group. He retired in 1987, returning to local politics by serving on Breckland District Council and Swaffham Town Council. He served as Mayor of Swaffham in 1991/1992, and only retired from the council in 2003. Disillusioned by the Iraq War, he then resigned from the Labour Party. He died the following year.

Trade union offices
| Preceded by Reg Bottini | General Secretary of the National Union of Agricultural and Allied Workers; 1978 – 1982 | Succeeded by Position abolished |
| Preceded by New position | Secretary of Agricultural and Allied Workers Group of the Transport and General Workers' Union; 1982 – 1987 | Succeeded by Barry Leathwood |
| Preceded by Reg Bottini | Agriculture Group representative on the General Council of the TUC; 1978 – 1982 | Succeeded by Council reorganised |
