= Alf Dann =

Alfred Clarence Dann (11 March 1893 – 16 January 1953) was a British trade union leader.

== Biography ==
Dann grew up in Southwark and attended the West Square High Grade School, before becoming a lawyer's clerk. He briefly served in the British Army during World War I, but was soon instead posted as an agricultural worker in East Anglia. Inspired by his experiences, he decided to devote his life to agricultural trade unionism and, in 1919, secured work as the head of the legal department of the National Union of Agricultural Workers (NUAW).

In 1928, Dann became chief of staff at the NUAW headquarters. He remained in the post until 1945, when he was elected as general secretary of the union. He was also elected to the General Council of the Trades Union Congress, and served on the Central Wages Board, and the executive of the International Land Workers' Federation. He died, still in office, early in 1953.

Trade union offices
Preceded by Bill Holmes	General Secretary of the National Union of Agricultural Workers; 1945 – 1953	Succeeded by Harold Collison
Preceded by Bill Holmes	Agriculture Group representative on the General Council of the TUC; 1945 – 1953	Succeeded by Harold Collison
