= Bill Holmes (trade unionist) =

British trade unionist and politician

William Holmes CBE (21 January 1873 – November 1961) was a British trade unionist and Labour Party politician.

== Early life and education ==
Holmes was born in Norfolk. His father was an active trade unionist, and his grandfather had been a Chartist. He left school at the age of 12 to become an agricultural labourer.

== Career ==
=== Political career ===
Holmes later took work at the Colman's mustard factory in Norwich and, in 1890, he joined the Norfolk and Norwich Amalgamated Labourers' Union. He was also a founder member of the Independent Labour Party, being particularly active in its cycling section. He was close to the Socialist League, although he did not join. In 1898, he did join the radical National Union of Gas Workers and General Labourers.

In 1905, Holmes was elected to Norwich City Council, becoming a Labour Party councillor when that organisation was established the following year. Also in 1906, he worked with George Edwards to found the National Union of Agricultural Workers (NUAW). Five years later, he was elected to the union's executive.

Holmes became prominent in the Labour Party and was appointed as one of its first two National Organisers in 1913. He stood unsuccessfully for the party in the 1920 Horncastle by-election and in Stafford at the 1922 United Kingdom general election.

=== Union work ===
Holmes continued in the post even though that year he was elected as President of the NUAW, but stood down in 1928 to become the union's General Secretary.

Established as the leading figure in the union, Holmes tried twice more to gain election to Parliament, in East Norfolk at the 1929 and 1931 general elections but was again unsuccessful. Alongside his union duties, he acted as an adviser to the International Labour Conference and was the Trades Union Congress's (TUC) delegate to the American Federation of Labor in 1932. In 1940, he served as President of the TUC, while in the 1941 New Year Honours he received the CBE.

== Later life ==
Holmes retired from his union posts in 1944. In retirement, he served on the Local Government Boundary Commission.

Trade union offices
Preceded by Walter Robert Smith	President of the National Union of Agricultural and Allied Workers; 1924–1928	Succeeded by Edwin Gooch
Preceded by Robert Barrie Walker	General Secretary of the National Union of Agricultural and Allied Workers; 1928–1944	Succeeded by Alf Dann
Preceded by Robert Barrie Walker	Agriculture Group representative on the General Council of the TUC; 1928–1945	Succeeded by Alf Dann
Preceded by John Beard and Frank Wolstencroft	Trades Union Congress representative to the American Federation of Labour; 1932; With: Charles Dukes	Succeeded by Joe Hall and Jimmy Rowan
Preceded by Joseph Hallsworth	President of the Trades Union Congress; 1939–1940	Succeeded by George Gibson
Party political offices
Preceded by New position	Eastern Division representative on the Independent Labour Party National Administrative Council; 1909–1916	Succeeded by Harry Dubery
