= International Arbitration League =

The International Arbitration League was a society of pacifists run by working-class men.

It was initially founded out of the British Workmen's Peace Committee, by the Nobel Peace Prize winner Sir William Randal Cremer and fellows from the recently dissolved Reform League. In 1870 it became known as the Workmen's Peace Association, only later becoming the International Arbitration League.

The organisation was run by men from working-class labouring backgrounds who were against increases in military spending or intervention in continental wars. It promoted a "high court of nations" and the development of international law. It was funded by the Peace Society for its first years, which was a primarily Christian organisation that sought absolute pacifism. Instead the League sought out arbitration, which was familiar with its membership, as the approach was known to work in labour disputes. From 1889 it promoted disarmament, rather than absolute pacifism.

The radical reformer Howard Evans was at various times its chairman, vice-chairman, secretary and treasurer. He wrote its manifesto, and its first article was the establishment of “High Court of Nations”. He was also the editor of its journal, The Arbitrator from 1872.

It expanded out to Paris and soon had agents covering large parts of Europe.

During World War I it supported the use of armies by the Allies as a defensive measure. It was a promoter of the League of Nations after the war's end.

The organization was later incorporated into the Mondcivitan Republic (Commonwealth of World Citizens) in 1958.

== See also ==
- International arbitration
- International Arbitration and Peace Association
