= Harold Collison =

British trade unionist (1909–1995)

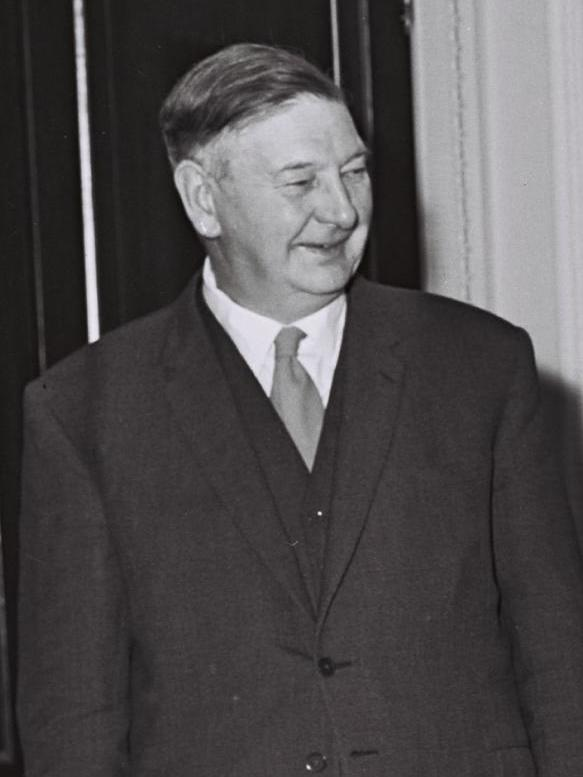
Harold Collison, 1965

Harold Francis Collison, Baron Collison, CBE, (10 May 1909 – 29 December 1995) was a British trade unionist.

Born in the East End of London, Collison grew up in Gloucester and attended the Crypt School, before working on a farm from the age of seventeen. He joined the National Union of Agricultural Workers and was also active in the Labour Party. From 1946, he worked at the union headquarters in London, and in 1953 he was elected General Secretary. In 1960, he became President of the International Federation of Plantation, Agricultural and Allied Workers, serving until 1976, and he was also a member of the executive of the International Labour Organization.

In the 1961 New Year Honours he was appointed a Commander of the Order of the British Empire (CBE). He was created a life peer on 14 December 1964 as Baron Collison, of Cheshunt, in the County of Hertford.

In 1965, Collison served as President of the Trades Union Congress. In 1969, he resigned as General Secretary of the union to become Chairman of the Supplementary Benefits Commission.

Trade union offices
Preceded by Alf Dann	General Secretary of the National Union of Agricultural Workers; 1953–1969	Succeeded by Reg Bottini
Preceded by Alf Dann	Agriculture Group representative on the General Council of the TUC; 1953–1970	Succeeded by Reg Bottini
Preceded by New position	President of the International Federation of Plantation and Agricultural Workers; 1960–1976	Succeeded by Tom Bavin
Preceded by George H. Lowthian	President of the Trades Union Congress; 1965	Succeeded by Joseph O'Hagan
Preceded by Frederick Hayday and Robert Main	Trades Union Congress representative to the AFL-CIO; 1966; With: Joseph O'Hagan	Succeeded by George Lowthian and Lewis Wright
