= John Hose =

British trade union leader (1928–2016)

John Horsley Hose CBE (21 March 1928 – 11 September 2016) was a British trade union leader.

Hose grew up in Nottingham, and attended the Nottingham Bluecoat School. In 1943, he became an architect's assistant, then from 1946 to 1948 undertook National Service with the Royal Engineers. The following year, he began working for the Forestry Commission, and remained in this line of work for many years, also joining the National Union of Agricultural and Allied Workers (NUAAW).

In 1978, Hose was elected as President of the NUAAW, in which role he campaigned for a ban on the use of 2,4,5-T, a weedkiller which had been used as a component of Agent Orange. In 1980, he was re-elected as president, defeating Joan Maynard. By this time, the union was in financial difficulties and in 1982, with the backing of Maynard but the opposition of Hose, it merged into the Transport and General Workers' Union (TGWU).

Hose became chairman of the TGWU's new Agricultural and Allied Workers' National Trade Group, serving for four years, after which he served on the union's General Executive Council for two years. In 1987, Hose was made a Commander of the Order of the British Empire, and he retired in 1989.

Hose died on 11 September 2016, at the age of 88.

Trade union offices
Preceded by Bert Hazell	President of the National Union of Agricultural and Allied Workers; 1978 – 1982	Succeeded by Position abolished
Preceded by New position	Chairman of the Agricultural and Allied Workers National Trade Group of the Transport and General Workers' Union; 1982 – 1986	Succeeded by Barry Leathwood
