= Edwin Gooch =

British politician (1889–1964)

Edwin George Gooch (15 January 1889 – 2 August 1964) was a British Labour Party politician and trade union leader.

Gooch was born in Wymondham, Norfolk, where he lived his entire life. He worked for a printer, then became a journalist. He joined the National Union of Journalists and became chair of its Norwich branch. He worked as election agent for George Edwards. He was elected as a Labour Party member of his parish, district and county councils, later being appointed an alderman for Norfolk County Council

In 1935, when Wymondham Urban District Council was created, Gooch became the first chairman of the new UDC and held the office for most of the period up to 1946. His wife, Ethel Gooch, became the council's first lady member in 1935 and its first lady chairman in 1951.

Gooch was elected to the executive committee of the National Union of Agricultural and Allied Workers in 1926, and served as the union's president from 1928 until his death in 1964.

At the 1931 general election, he was an unsuccessful candidate in the Conservative-held South Norfolk constituency.

Gooch did not contest the 1935 general election, but at the 1945 general election, he was elected as Member of Parliament for North Norfolk, defeating the Conservative MP Thomas Cook. He held the seat until his death shortly before the 1964 general election, aged 75.

He was chairman of the Labour Party's National Executive Committee from 1955 to 1956.

Trade union offices
Preceded by Bill Holmes	President of the National Union of Agricultural and Allied Workers; 1928–1964	Succeeded by Bert Hazell
Preceded by Joseph Forbes Duncan	President of the International Landworkers' Federation; 1950–1959	Succeeded by Position abolished
Parliament of the United Kingdom
Preceded by Thomas Cook	Member of Parliament for North Norfolk; 1945–1964	Succeeded by Bert Hazell
Party political offices
Preceded by Edith Summerskill	Chair of the Labour Party; 1955–1956	Succeeded by Margaret Herbison
