= Lincolnshire Labour League =

Former trade union in the United Kingdom

Amalgamated Labour League
- Founded: September 1872; 153 years ago
- Dissolved: 1896; 130 years ago
- Type: Trade union
- Location: United Kingdom
- Secretary: William Banks (first)
- Affiliations: Federal Union of Laborers
- Formerly called: Lincolnshire Amalgamated Emigration and Migration Labour League

The Amalgamated Labour League, was a trade union representing agricultural labourers in Eastern England.

It was founded in 1872 as the Lincolnshire Amalgamated Emigration and Migration Labour League which was often shortened to Lincolnshire Labour League.

== History ==
A large number of local unions of agricultural labourers were established in England early in 1872. In Lincolnshire, this started with meetings held early in February in Barton-upon-Humber, Brattleby, Butterwick, Cammeringham, Frieston, Hibaldstow, Leverton, Long Bennington, North Carlton, Redbourne, Scampton and South Carlton. Typically, these meetings discussed a minimum wage and maximum hours for which the labourers were prepared to work.

Over the following months, several local unions were established: the Alford Labourers' Protection and Emigration Society, Bourn Agricultural Labourers' Society, Caistor Labourers' Protection Society, Louth and District Agricultural Labourers' Society, Lincoln Labour League, Long Sutton Nine Hours Labour League, Market Rasen Labourers' Protection and Emigration Society, and Swineshead Agricultural Labourers' Society.

In September, the main local unions in Lincolnshire met at the Spread Eagle in Grantham to establish a county union. It was named the Lincolnshire Amalgamated Emigration and Migration Labour League, with William Banks as secretary, and offices on Witham Street in Boston. George Allen was elected as treasurer, replaced later in the decade by Edward Bradbury, and then by William Taylor.

At the same time, the National Agricultural Labourers' Union (NALU) was established, based in Warwickshire, attracting many members in surrounding counties, but relatively few from Lincolnshire. NALU differed by holding almost all its funds centrally, while the Labour League allowed each branch to control most of the funds it raised.

In September 1873, a meeting was held in Nottingham, with the aim of merging the Labour League with NALU, but NALU would not consider any changes to its system of government, and negotiations broke down. The Labour League instead joined with a number of other county unions in the Federal Union of Labourers, a much looser organisation. The Labour League began building up branches in Norfolk and Suffolk, and by 1874 had reached a peak membership of about 15,500, spread over 25 districts.

The union initially won wage increases, but by 1874 farmers were ready to work together to defeat the union. A lock out of unionised labourers led to defeat for the workers, and wages were reduced. Some members emigrated, while others were forced to leave in return for their jobs. Membership began falling, dropping to 5,500 by 1877. It nearly collapsed in 1880, but relocated its office to its strongest remaining area of Eye, Suffolk, and had about 200 members throughout the decade.

Membership of the union fell again in the 1890s, and in 1896, when it had only 38 members, it decided to dissolve.

== Districts ==
District	Secretary
Alford	John Lile
Aylsham	William Abbs; R. S. Constable
Barnetby	John N. Catley
Boston	John Robert Smith (1875–1878); William Taylor (from 1878)
Brigg	
Cossey	James Yallop
Cromer	James W. Ling
Denver	Edward Robinson
Dersingham	D. Reynolds
Eye	Otto Rands (1873–1878); William Taylor (from 1879)
Framsden	James Dorling
Grantham	
Hempton	James Dennis
Horncastle	James Freshney
Laceby	Henry Tomlinson (1874)
Lincoln	George Allen
Loddon	Henry Bailes
Long Stratton	George Matthews
Louth	William Fox
Newark	
Peasenhall	W. Knights (to 1876); George G. Goddard (1877); C. Hakin (from 1878)
Stowbridge	Richard Bear
Thetford	George Gathercole

== Works cited ==
- Newby, Howard (1987). Country life: a social history of rural England. London: Weidenfeld and Nicolson. ISBN 978-0-297-79063-1.
- Groves, Reg (1981). Sharpen the Sickle!:The History of the Farm Workers' Union. Merlin Press. ISBN 978-0-85036-695-2.
