= Flanesford Priory =

Augustinian priory in Herefordshire, England

Coordinates: 51.8712°N 2.6128°W

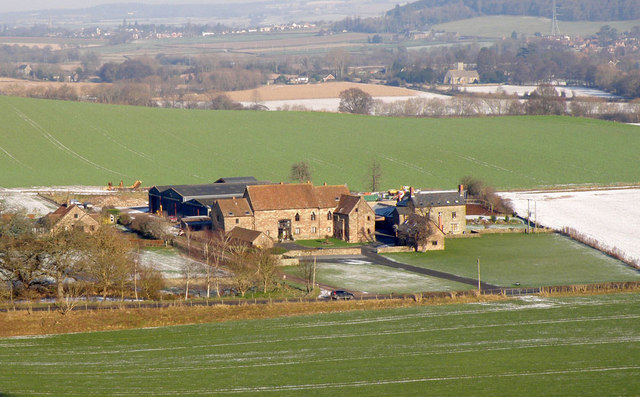
Flanesford Priory

Flanesford Priory was an Augustinian priory in Herefordshire, England.

Sir Richard Talbot, then owner of nearby Goodrich Castle, founded the priory in 1346 as a house of the Canons Regular of St Augustine. The priory church was dedicated to St John the Baptist and Sir Richard Talbot was buried there on his death.

Weakened by the Black Death, the priory was one of the first to succumb at the Dissolution of the Monasteries. After it was dissolved in 1537, ownership was granted to George Talbot, 6th Earl of Shrewsbury. On his death in 1590 the property passed to his son Gilbert, who died in 1616 without a male heir. The Priory buildings were then used as farm buildings until 1980, when they were converted into self-catering holiday apartments.

The surviving priory buildings, in particular the refectory building, are Grade I listed. The refectory building, consisting originally of two storeys, is constructed of squared sandstone rubble with ashlar dressings but with a 20th-century roof. Internally it has been modified over the years for farming purposes and latterly for accommodation.

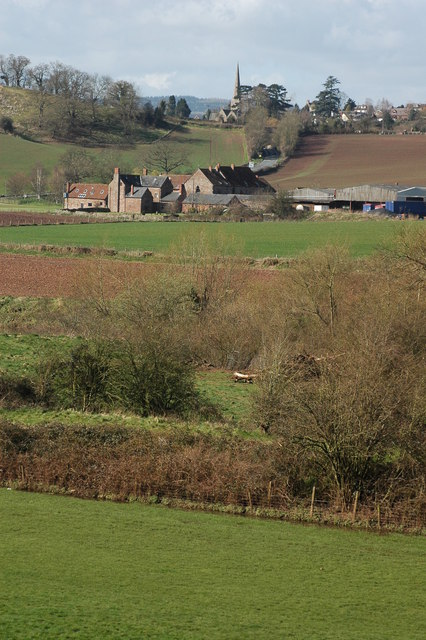
The priory seen with the former trackbed of the Ross and Monmouth Railway near Kerne Bridge railway station.
