= National Agricultural Labourers' Union =

Former trade union of the United Kingdom

- Founded: February 1872
- Dissolved: 1896
- Headquarters: Leamington
- Location: United Kingdom
- Members: 86,214 (1874)
- Key people: Joseph Arch (President)
- Publication: Labourers' Union Chronicle
- Affiliations: TUC

The National Agricultural Labourers Union (NALU) was a trade union representing farm workers in Great Britain.

== Foundation ==
The union's origins lay in a meeting at Wellesbourne in Warwickshire, held in February 1872. Joseph Arch, a well-known labourer and Methodist preacher, addressed a meeting which was to have been held in the Stags Head pub. However, rather than the thirty or so labourers he had expected to attend, around 2,000 workers from across south Warwickshire turned up. The meeting was held outside, Arch speaking under a chestnut tree.

The success of Arch's speech led to a series of further meetings, and the election of a committee, who met at John Lewis' farmhouse in the village. On Good Friday, the committee held a meeting at Leamington Spa which established the Warwickshire Agricultural Labourers Union, Arch becoming its president, Henry Taylor its general secretary, and Matthew Vincent its treasurer.

== Policies ==
The union aimed to limit working time to a nine-and-a-half hour day, and institute a minimum wage of 16 shillings a week. It supported workers who wished to emigrate, reasoning that this would reduce labour supply in Britain and drive up wages. It also supported the Liberal Party's "Free Breakfast Table" policy of abolishing taxes on basic foodstuffs.

== Growth and decline ==
The union recruited rapidly, asking new members for 6d, then 2d a week subscription. Meetings were held across the country, leading the union to become the "National Agricultural Labourers Union". The initial success of the union led to several rivals emerging: the Kent and Sussex Agricultural Labourers' Union, Lincolnshire Labour League, Huntingdonshire Agricultural Labourers' Union, Oxford and District Agricultural Labourers' Union, Suffolk and Cambridge Agricultural Labourers' Union, West Surrey Union, Wiltshire Agricultural and General Labourers' Union, Worcestershire Agricultural Labourers' Union, and unions in Devon, Dorset, Norfolk, Shropshire and South Buckinghamshire. In March 1873, the London Trades Council organised a conference aiming to merge all the unions together. However, NALU refused to amend any of its rules. Its Gloucester District disagreed, and joined with the other unions in forming the Federal Union of Labourers.

By 1873, membership of NALU had reached 71,835 in 982 branches, with wages reportedly increasing by 20 to 25%. Membership peaked at 86,214 in 1874, but by now, farmers were organising in opposition to the union, employing only non-union labour and agreeing to offer standard terms of 2 shillings for a 12-hour day. More than 10,000 union members found themselves out of work; the union paid unemployment benefit, but this was unsustainable, and it gave in during July. Despite the defeat, membership initially remained high, as workers were encouraged to secretly maintain union membership while working for anti-union farmers. However, a succession of poor harvests weakened the union's position, and membership fell below 10,000 in 1887, then halved again that year; the few remaining members were concentrated in Eastern England. Industrially weak, the union turned its attention to campaigning for an extension of the electoral franchise to all adult men, and providing sickness and funeral benefits to members.

A banner from the Oxford branch dating from 1883 held at The Museum of English Rural Life shows how visible and the active the union was.

In 1890, Arch began a new recruitment campaign; many workers were inspired by the London Dock strike of 1889, and membership again rose above 15,000, two-thirds of them in Norfolk. However, further strike defeats over the next few years led to wage reductions. Membership dropped quickly, falling to 1,000 in 1895. The union dissolved itself the following year.

== Activists ==
The first executive committee, elected in 1872, consisted of George Allington, Thomas Biddle, H. Blackwell, Thomas Harris, E. Haynes, B. Herring, G. Jordans, G. Lunnon, Tom Parker, E. Pill, T. Prickett and Edwars Russell. The 1875 executive committee consisted of Malin (Warwickshire), H. Blackwell (Warwickshire), Edward Richardson (Wolverton), Henry Hemming (Cirencester), George M. Ball (Suffolk), James Margeston (Swaffham), James Crick (Suffolk), Ford (Banbury), George A. Morris (South Lincolnshire), Bowdon (Cirencester), Johnson (Wolverton) and Edgington (Oxford). Its trustees were Alfred Arnold, Jesse Collings, Edward Jenkins and George Mitchell, and F. S. Attenborough was the treasurer.

The Norfolk-based union has a very different leadership; in 1891, its executive consisted of A. Baker, J. Cockbill, W. Eatwell, Thomas Lambert, S. Lush, J. Taylor and Zacharias Walker.

Other activists in the union included Arthur Clayden, Howard Evans, Auberon Herbert, John Lewis, Harry Nicolls, George Rix and Hugh Fairfax-Cholmeley.

=== General Secretaries ===
1872: Henry Taylor
1877: Robert Collier
1890: Thomas Wager
