= Joseph Arch =

English trade unionist and politician (1826–1919)

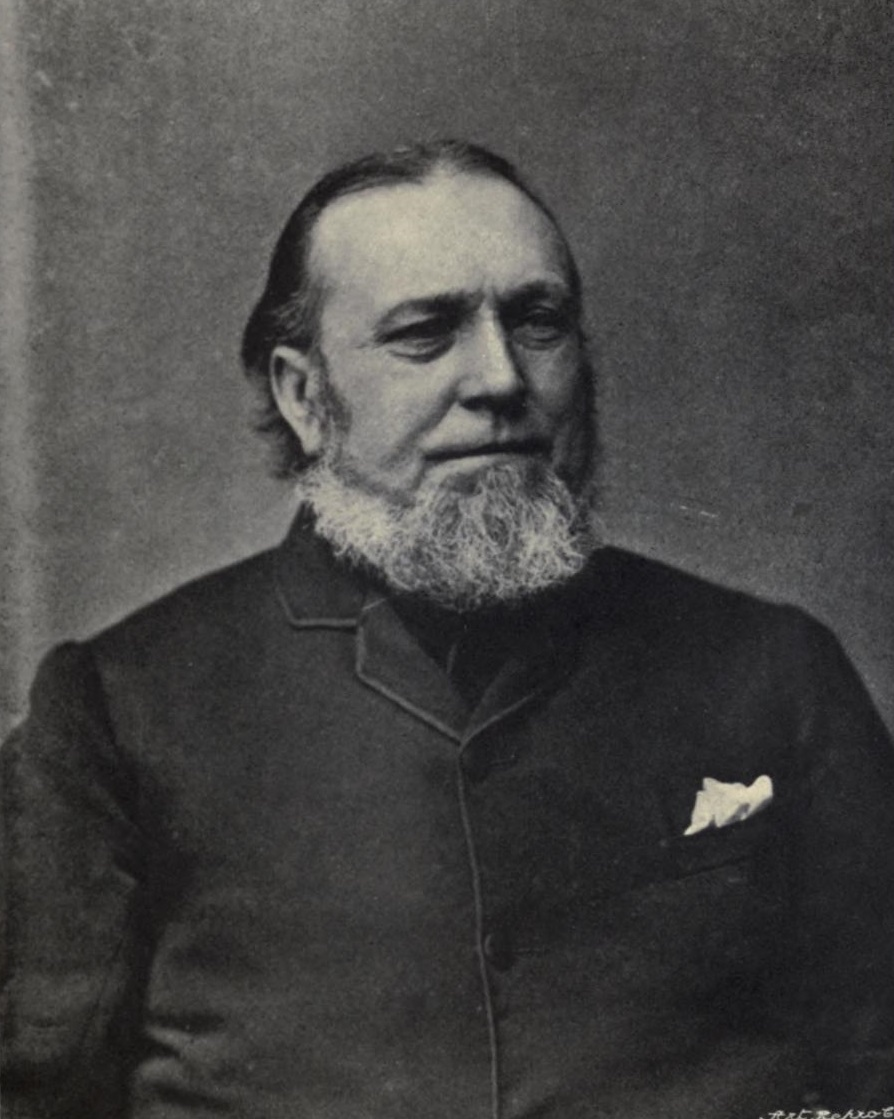
- Arch, by Elliott & Fry

Member of Parliament for North West Norfolk
- In office 1885–1886
- Preceded by: New constituency
- Succeeded by: Lord Henry Cavendish-Bentinck
- In office 1892–1900
- Preceded by: Lord Henry Cavendish-Bentinck
- Succeeded by: George White

Personal details
- Born: 10 November 1826 Barford, Warwickshire
- Died: 12 February 1919 (aged 92)
- Party: Liberal

Joseph Arch (10 November 1826 – 12 February 1919) was an English trade unionist and Liberal politician, born in Barford, Warwickshire, who played a key role in unionising agricultural workers and in championing their welfare. Following their enfranchisement, he became a Member of Parliament.

== Biography of an agricultural labourer ==
Joseph Arch came from a family that had lived in the Warwickshire village of Barford for three generations and had owned their own cottage there since the 18th century. He started work at the age of nine as a crow-scarer, working 12 hours a day. Afterwards he became a plough-boy, progressing to mastery of all-round skills, which enabled him to move around the Midlands and South Wales, earning a reasonable wage. At the same time he observed the terrible conditions in which the majority of agricultural labours lived. These were later described by the Countess of Warwick in the introduction she wrote to his autobiography.

Bread was dear, and wages down to starvation point; the labourers were uneducated, under-fed, underpaid; their cottages were often unfit for human habitation, the sleeping and sanitary arrangements were appalling … In many a country village the condition of the labourer and his family was but little removed from that of the cattle they tended.

Returning home, Arch married in 1847 and eventually had seven children. He also became a Primitive Methodist preacher but was discriminated against in the village by the parson and his wife, with whom his family had always been at odds. During this period he educated himself politically from old newspapers and became a supporter of Liberalism. It was therefore to him as a well-respected and experienced agricultural worker, that his destitute fellow workers eventually turned for help in their fight for a living wage. Called to address an initial meeting held on 7 February 1872 in the Stag's Head public house in Wellesbourne, Arch had been expecting an attendance of fewer than thirty. Instead, he found on his arrival that over 2,000 agricultural labourers from all the surrounding area had arrived to hear him speak. The meeting was therefore held under a large chestnut tree opposite on a dark, wet, winter night, with the labourers holding flickering lanterns on bean poles to illuminate the proceedings.

After further meetings, it was agreed to elect a committee, which met at the old farmhouse of John Lewis in Wellesbourne. Then on Good Friday, 29 March 1872, farm workers from all parts of South Warwickshire met in Leamington to form the Warwickshire Agricultural Labourers Union and after agitation up and down the country, the National Agricultural Labourers' Union was established on 29 May with Arch as its president. Following the withdrawal of their labour, when farmers and landowners found their reprisals were no longer effective, there was a temporary rise in the workers' wages, whereupon they ceased to organise. Later lock-outs of union members by farm owners became widespread and the union finally collapsed in 1896, although it was replaced a decade later by the National Union of Agricultural and Allied Workers in 1906.

== Public life ==
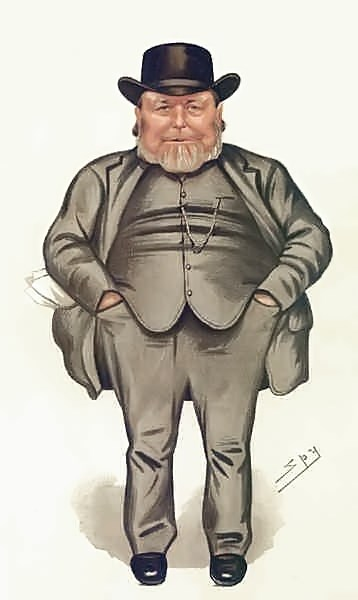
Arch caricatured by Spy in Vanity Fair, 1886

During the high point of the union agitation, Arch was identified with the popular cause and many agricultural labourers would display his portrait in their homes. He also became the subject of such rallying songs as

Joe Arch he raised his voice,
'twas for the working men,
Then let us all rejoice and say,
We'll all be union men.

In 1873 he was invited over by the Canadian government and examined the suitability of the country for British emigration. Impressed by his report, during the next few years his Union helped over 40,000 farm labourers and their families to emigrate there and to Australia.

Arch also turned to agitating for the widening of the voting franchise, which until then only included property owners, and this resulted in the passing of the 1884 Parliamentary Reform Act. In the ensuing 1885 General Election, Arch was returned as the Liberal Party MP for North West Norfolk, the first agricultural labourer to enter the House of Commons. Losing his seat with William Gladstone’s defeat in June 1886, he was re-elected to the same constituency in 1892, when he was one of twelve labouring class MPs in parliament. Though he was appointed as a member of the Royal Commission on the Aged Poor in 1893, he seldom spoke and his former supporters came to perceive him as pompous and out of touch. Now they sang about him

Joseph Arch he stole a march,
Upon a spotted cow.
He scampered off to Parliament,
But where is Joseph now?

In 1898, Arch published a pugnacious and opinionated autobiography, upon which The Spectator commented at the start of its long review that "One cannot help wishing that this book were more of an autobiography, and less of a polemic against Mr. Arch's adversaries, political and social." Retiring from Parliament before the 1900 General Election, Arch returned to his home in Barford, where he continued to live until his death nineteen years later.

== Legacy ==
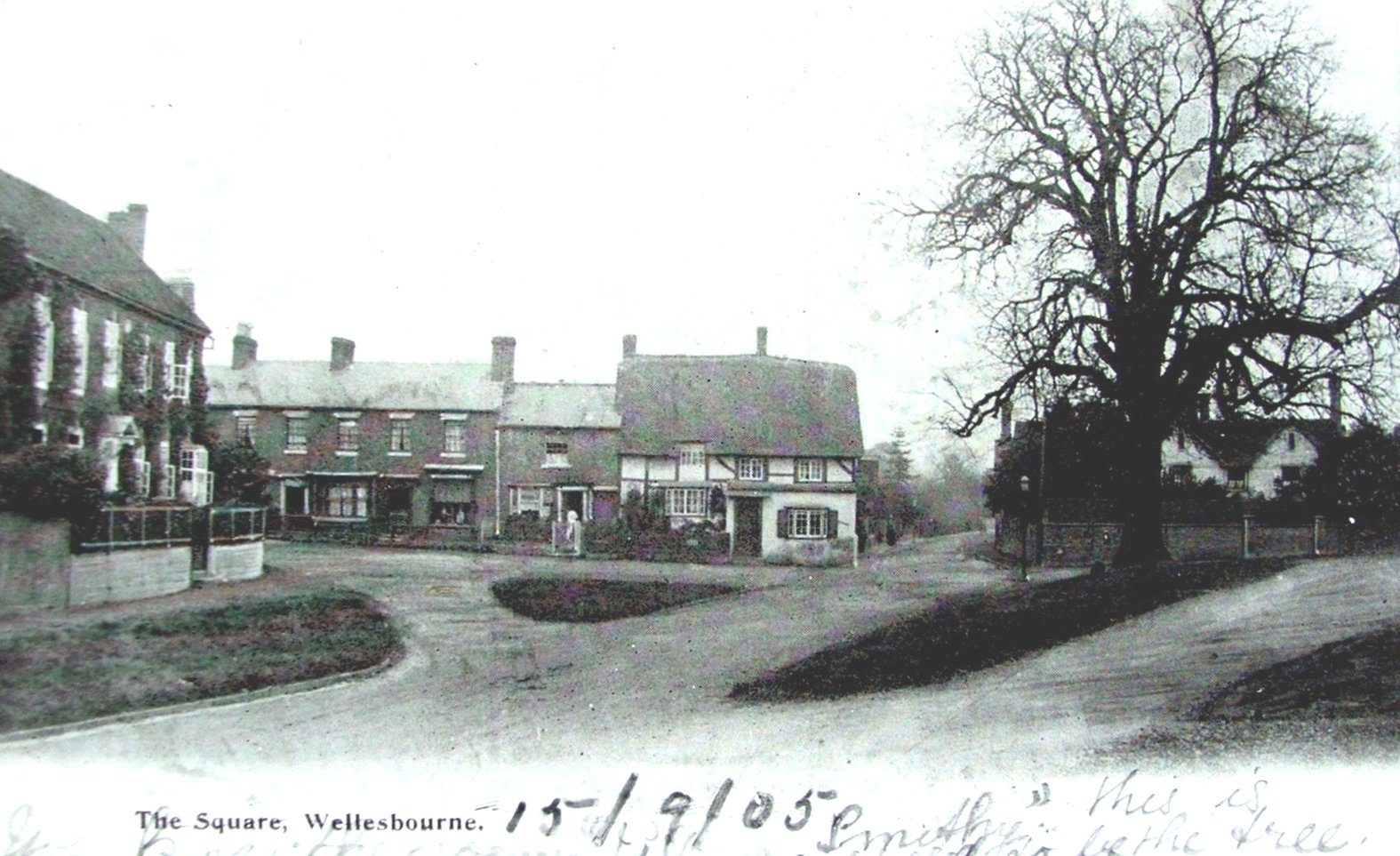
The Wellesbourne Tree in 1905

The old ‘Wellesbourne Tree’ died in 1948 but the spot was marked by a commemorative stone at the old meeting place, now renamed Chestnut Square. In 1952 the National Union of Agricultural Workers erected a bus shelter there and set up inside it a commemorative plaque which still remains. A replacement tree was also planted where every year union representatives once gathered on 7 February and then went on to Barford to lay a wreath upon Arch's grave. Though the unions no longer do this, the Wellesbourne Action Group organises a walk from Barford to Wellesbourne in June each year along the footpath known as the Joseph Arch Way. There is now also a Joseph Arch Road in the village which runs off the A439 roundabout, while in Barford the old coaching inn has been renamed the Joseph Arch pub.

The Museum of English Rural Life has an archive with holdings relating to Arch which include personal diaries and ledgers and the Union collecting boxes. There are also curious plaster casts of his hands and wrists (Object number, 75/16/1-2).

Parliament of the United Kingdom
New constituency	Member of Parliament for North West Norfolk; 1885 – 1886	Succeeded by Lord Henry Cavendish-Bentinck
Preceded by Lord Henry Cavendish-Bentinck	Member of Parliament for North West Norfolk; 1892 – 1900	Succeeded by George White
