= Mike Granatt =

British communications professional

Mike Granatt CB
- Born: 1950 (age 75–76)
- Education: Westminster City School; Queen Mary College, University of London
- Occupations: Public relations and communications professional
- Known for: First head of the Civil Contingencies Secretariat (2001)
- Awards: Companion of the Order of the Bath (2001)

Mike Granatt CB is a public relations and communications professional, formerly a senior British civil servant, and the first head of the Civil Contingencies Secretariat of the Cabinet Office in 2001, the same year he was appointed a Companion of the Order of the Bath for "exceptional public service."

For 25 years Granatt held a range of senior communication posts in the British civil service, and was press secretary to five cabinet ministers, both Conservative and Labour. Alongside his communications management roles he specialised in crisis management and counterterrorist issues, and his final posting was to create and lead Britain's civil crisis management unit and the government's communication specialists. He is regularly interviewed in the media on the handling of terrorism and major emergencies.

== Early life ==
Granatt attended Westminster City School from 1961, then Queen Mary College, University of London where he ran the students' union newspaper for two years. He briefly appeared in what its members considered the legendary folk/rock band Pig Rider penning some of the lyrics for the curiously mis-titled Paeolithic Transport Blues.

== Career ==
After working as a trade and local news journalist, Granatt joined the civil service in 1979 as an information officer. After junior postings in the Department of Employment and the Home Office, he joined the Department of Energy and became director of information within three years. In this role he managed the response to the Piper Alpha oil rig disaster. He went on to hold similar posts, becoming Director of Public Affairs and Internal Communication for the Metropolitan Police in 1989, Director of Communication at the Department of the Environment in 1992, and Director of Communication at the Home Office in 1994. He was nicknamed "Metal Mickey" due to his always having the latest gadgets.

While at the Home Office he was appointed head of profession for the Government Information Service, becoming full-time in that post on transfer to the Cabinet Office in 1998. This move, to provide direct support to Sir Richard Wilson (now Lord Wilson of Dinton), then cabinet secretary, was made to help deliver changes facing the renamed Government Information and Communication Service (GICS) after Labour won power in 1997.

Much of his work concentrated on reforms, including founding a media monitoring unit in September 1997 due to ministers' dissatisfaction with the work of the GIS, and criticising the government's advertising campaigns as fragmented and wasteful. He was also the central adviser on the ethics and guidance governing the work of the GICS and other government communication staff. He wrote guidelines for the general election period in 2001 advising press officers to "Stay paranoid, stay boring, stay safe". Granatt describes Alastair Campbell, who was Tony Blair's special advisor at the time, as "an extraordinarily good operator", though he thought he was given too much power.

=== Crisis management ===
"There were very real problems which needed to be addressed. Things don't go right by accident."

— Granatt on the Millennium Bug.

Granatt took a leading role in co-ordinating public information from government in the run up to the Millennium, during the nationwide fuel protests of 2000, and the foot and mouth disease outbreak in 2001. Granatt said of the existing systems that "we've got a system that was put in place for nuclear war."

"Believe it might happen."

— Granatt's maxim for crisis management.

In 2001 Granatt was asked to set up the Civil Contingencies Secretariat, to reform Whitehall's civil emergencies arrangements and carry out "horizon scanning" after the earlier failures in the government's communication responses to crises. CCS was established in July 2001, and replaced the Home Office's Emergency Planning Division, which had replaced the Home Defence and Emergency Services Division of Cold War days, but its mission to update the UK's emergency planning arrangements was swept up in the counterterrorist reforms following 11 September 2001.

Having established CCS, in late 2002 Granatt reverted to the sole job of leading the GICS and was promoted to director-general, at the second highest rank in the civil service.

At the end of December 2003, Granatt took early retirement following a review into the GICS led by Sir Bob Phillis that abolished his post.

=== Consulting and PR ===
Granatt then joined George Pitcher's city consultancy Luther Pendragon in 2004. In this role he was Michael Martin's media advisor when Martin was Speaker of the House of Commons from 2005 until February 2008. He resigned saying he had been misled over a scandal involving the Speaker's expenses. One of his clients in 2007 was the BBC Trust.

Currently he is senior associate fellow at the Advanced Research and Assessment Group of the Defence Academy of the UK, a fellow of the Chartered Institute of Public Relations, a past master of the City of London Guild of Public Relations Practitioners, chair of the governors and trustees of Mary Hare School, and chairman of the UK Press Card Authority. The IPR awarded him the Sir Stephen Tallents medal in 2002. He was previously a visiting professor at the University of Westminster.

In 2005 he wrote a code of ethics for media commentators with Patrick Lagedec. In 2007, he was the author of Luther Pendragon's code of conduct, which formed part of their submission to the House of Commons Public Administration Select Committee inquiry into lobbying in 2008.

Mike Granatt is also National Advisor to Community Resilience UK.
