= Civil Contingencies Secretariat =

British government emergency planning organisation

Agency overview
- Formed: July 2001; 25 years ago
- Employees: 75
- Annual budget: £10 million
- Agency executive: Roger Hargreaves, Director
- Parent agency: Cabinet Office
- Website: www.gov.uk/government/policies/emergency-planning

The Civil Contingencies Secretariat (CCS), created in July 2001 and disbanded in July 2022, was the executive department of the British Cabinet Office responsible for emergency planning in the United Kingdom. The role of the secretariat was to ensure the UK's resilience against disruptive challenge, and to do this by working with others to anticipate, assess, prevent, prepare, respond and recover. Until its creation in 2001, emergency planning in Britain was the responsibility of the Home Office. The CCS also supported the Civil Contingencies Committee, commonly known as COBRA.

== Formation ==
In the aftermath of the Y2K bug scare, the fuel protests of 2000, flooding in autumn 2000, and the foot and mouth epidemic of 2001 the UK government felt that the existing emergency management policies and structures were inadequate to deal with natural or man-made disasters, and formed the Civil Contingencies Secretariat in July 2001, located in the Cabinet Office. Soon after the 9/11 attacks the remit of the CCS was expanded to include mitigating the consequences of a large scale terrorist attack.

Until 2001 the Home Office carried out emergency preparedness planning through its Emergency Planning Division, which in turn replaced the Home Defence and Emergency Services Division. From 1935 to 1971 a separate department, called the Civil Defence Department (in the early years the Air Raid Precautions Department, Ministry of Home Security), existed.

== Remit and reporting ==
In 2002 David Blunkett, then Home Secretary, stated, in a written reply to a parliamentary question:

The remit of the Civil Contingencies Secretariat is to make the United Kingdom more effective in planning for, dealing with, and learning lessons from emergencies and disasters.

— David Blunkett,

He went on to state:

The Secretariat services the Civil Contingencies Committee, which I chair and in addition as part of the Cabinet Office reports to my right hon. Friend, the Prime Minister (Mr. Blair) through the Cabinet Secretary (Sir Richard Wilson).

— David Blunkett,

The Civil Contingencies Committee, often informally referred to as COBRA from the name of the room used, is a forum for ministers and senior officials to discuss and manage serious (level 2) and catastrophic (level 3) emergencies.

In 2010, the secretariat launched an emergency communications service based on the Skynet military communication satellite system, called High Integrity Telecommunications System, for use by British police and other emergency services, primarily at Strategic Command Centres and at major events and emergencies. It replaced the earlier Emergency Communications Network.

Serco operates the Emergency Planning College in Easingwold, North Yorkshire under contract to the secretariat.

== Structure ==
The secretariat was led by a director and initially comprised five divisions dealing with:

- Assessment – assessing known risks and scanning for future potential risks
- Capability Management – working with departments facing potential disruption, and advising on how to prevent or manage crisis
- Communication and Learning – including the News Co-ordination Centre in the Cabinet Office and the Emergency Planning College
- National Resilience Framework – developing partnerships between governmental agencies, voluntary agencies, local communities and private sector groups
- Programme Co-ordination – providing secretariat support for the Civil Contingencies Committee

In 2012, the CCS still had five sections, with a slightly different emphasis:

- Capabilities
- Local Response Capabilities
- Emergency Planning College
- Horizon Scanning & Response
- Natural Hazards Team

== Reform and disbandment ==
Following the Covid pandemic, and as a result of the risks faced by the UK becoming more complex, interconnected and demanding, the Cabinet Office made changes in July 2022 to support how the government responds to emergencies and to improve the long-term resilience of the UK. The Civil Contingencies Secretariat was split into two separate resilience functions:

- The COBR Unit, which continued to lead the government's response to crisis, domestic and international, malicious and non-malicious
- A Resilience Directorate, which led the government's efforts to bolster the UK's resilience. This unit was responsible for the government's work on national resilience, managing the resilience system, resilience frameworks and risk processes.

In July 2025, the COBR Unit and the Resilience Directorate were re-merged, with the successor organisation named the 'COBR Directorate'.

== Directors of the Civil Contingencies Secretariat ==
- Mike Granatt (2001–2002)
- Susan Scholefield (2002–2004)
- Bruce Mann (2004–2009)
- Christina Scott (2009–2013)
- Campbell McCafferty (2013–2016)
- Katharine Hammond (2016–2020)
- Roger Hargreaves (2020–2022)

== Documents issued ==
The CCS has produced the following documents:

- Emergency Response and Recovery which provides non-statutory guidance to accompany the Civil Contingencies Act 2004. First published in November 2005, it was last updated in October 2013.

== See also ==
- Civil Contingencies Committee
- CONOPS
- Joint Terrorism Analysis Centre
- National Protective Security Authority
- Defence and Overseas Secretariat
- Economic and Domestic Affairs Secretariat
- European Secretariat
- Federal Emergency Management Agency, US counterpart
- Operation Yellowhammer
