= Police escort =

Escort by law enforcement officers

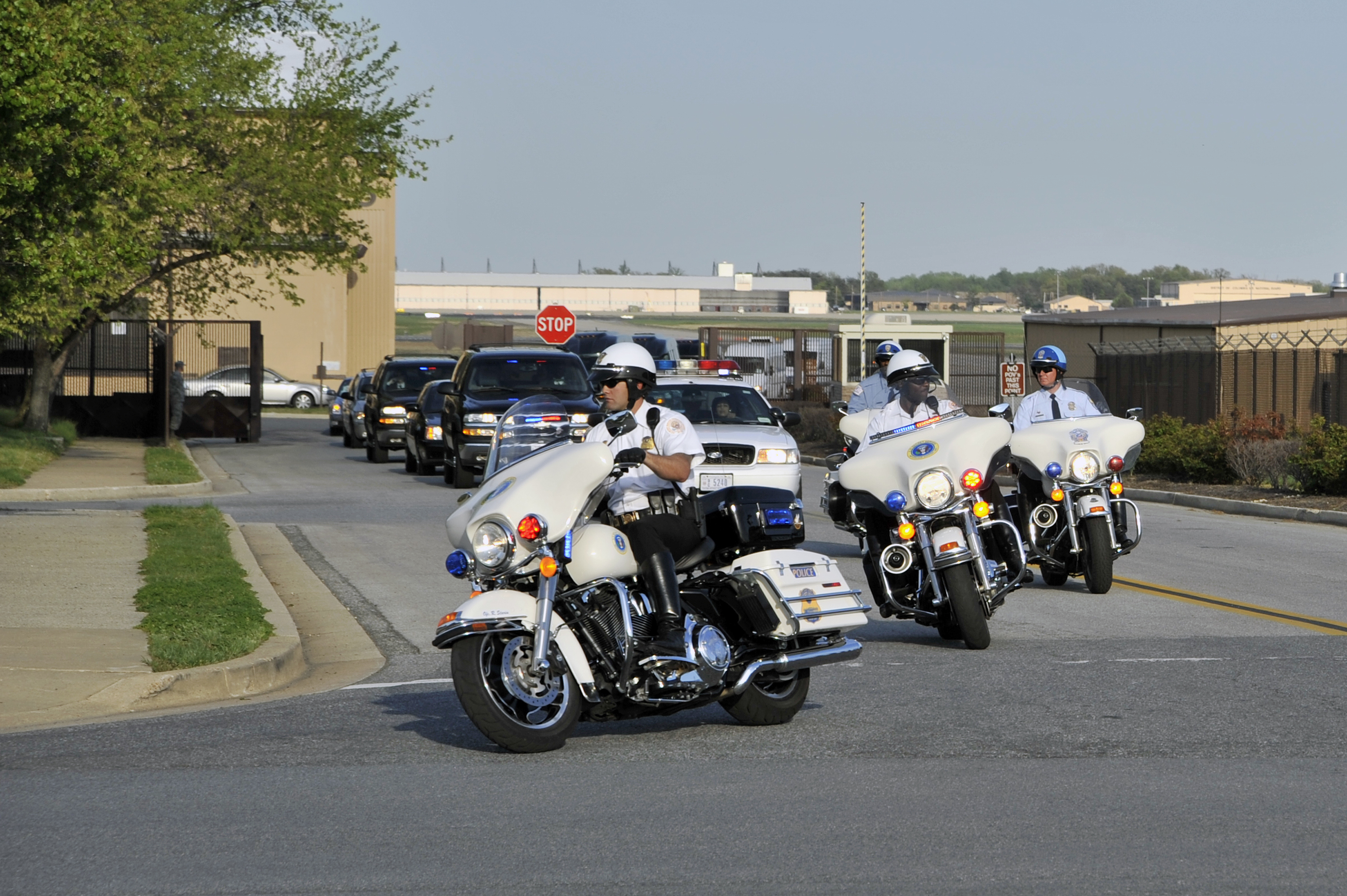
Police escort a dignitary of South Korean president Lee Myung-bak in the U.S. on April 11, 2010

A police escort is a group of law enforcement officers assigned to an individual or group to serve as a visible presence capable of exercising their police authority for public safety.

Their presence can be as bodyguards, providing crowd and traffic control, or as a guard of honour for a dignitary. They are most commonly seen facilitating the movement of important individuals in public, a funeral procession, or oversized and hazardous loads that require the suspension of regular traffic regulations.

== History ==
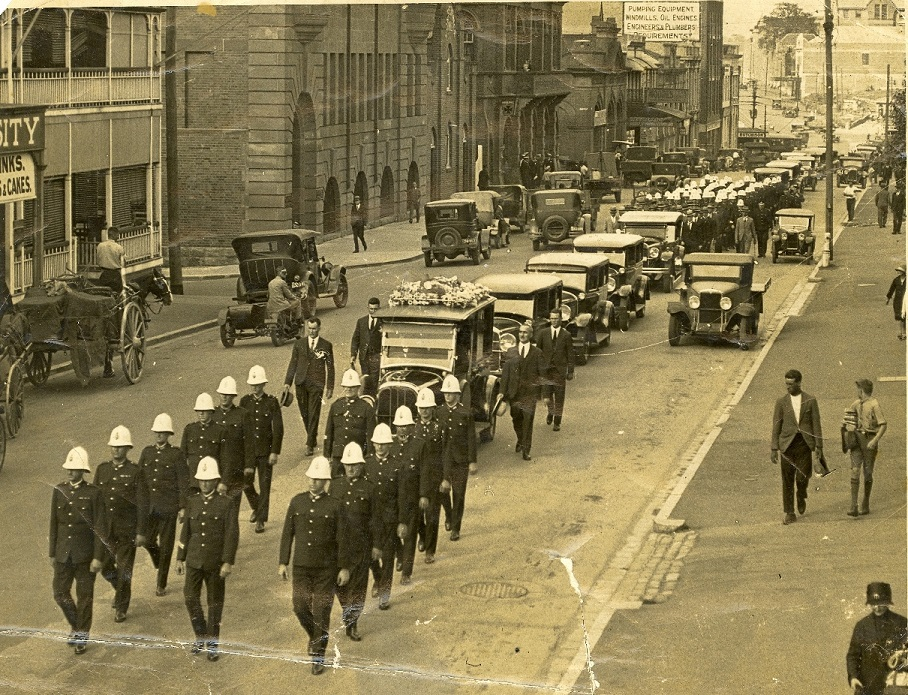
Australian police officers participate in the funeral procession for a fallen officer in 1931

A police escort is the evolution of a military escort used by dignitaries outside their loyal close protection details, providing greater security and facilitating ease of travel through public areas. As the concept of modern policing developed as a separate civilian institution charged with the preservation of public safety amongst the citizens of a state rather than an overt military unit to force its citizens into submission, the switch to using police rather than military escorts in all but the most ceremonial roles began to take place.

On longer distance travels or for ceremonial occasions, supernumeraries would be added to the normal retinue, with mounted guards able to scout ahead, and heralds to announce the arrival of the dignitary. Such supernumeraries were often used not only for protection, but also as status symbols for the affluent as a demonstration of their ability provide livery and maintenance to the lesser classes. Elements of such largesse can be seen today in the use of motorcycle police officers assigned to celebrities or public figures who aren't just acting as ceremonial honor guards, but often performing their law enforcement duties clearing traffic ahead of a motorcade.

Civil and military scientists determined that overt military displays by public officials in such situations can create a security dilemma in its implied validation of the official's policies, and seen as threat to democracy and personal liberty, weakening the citizenry's trust as the acts of an authoritarian government. The United States passed the Posse Comitatus Act in 1878, prohibiting the use of military forces on American soil for political gain and giving the party in power unfair advantage. Thus civilian law enforcement responsibilities were expanded or created to fill the gap to provide security previously handled by the military.

== Today ==
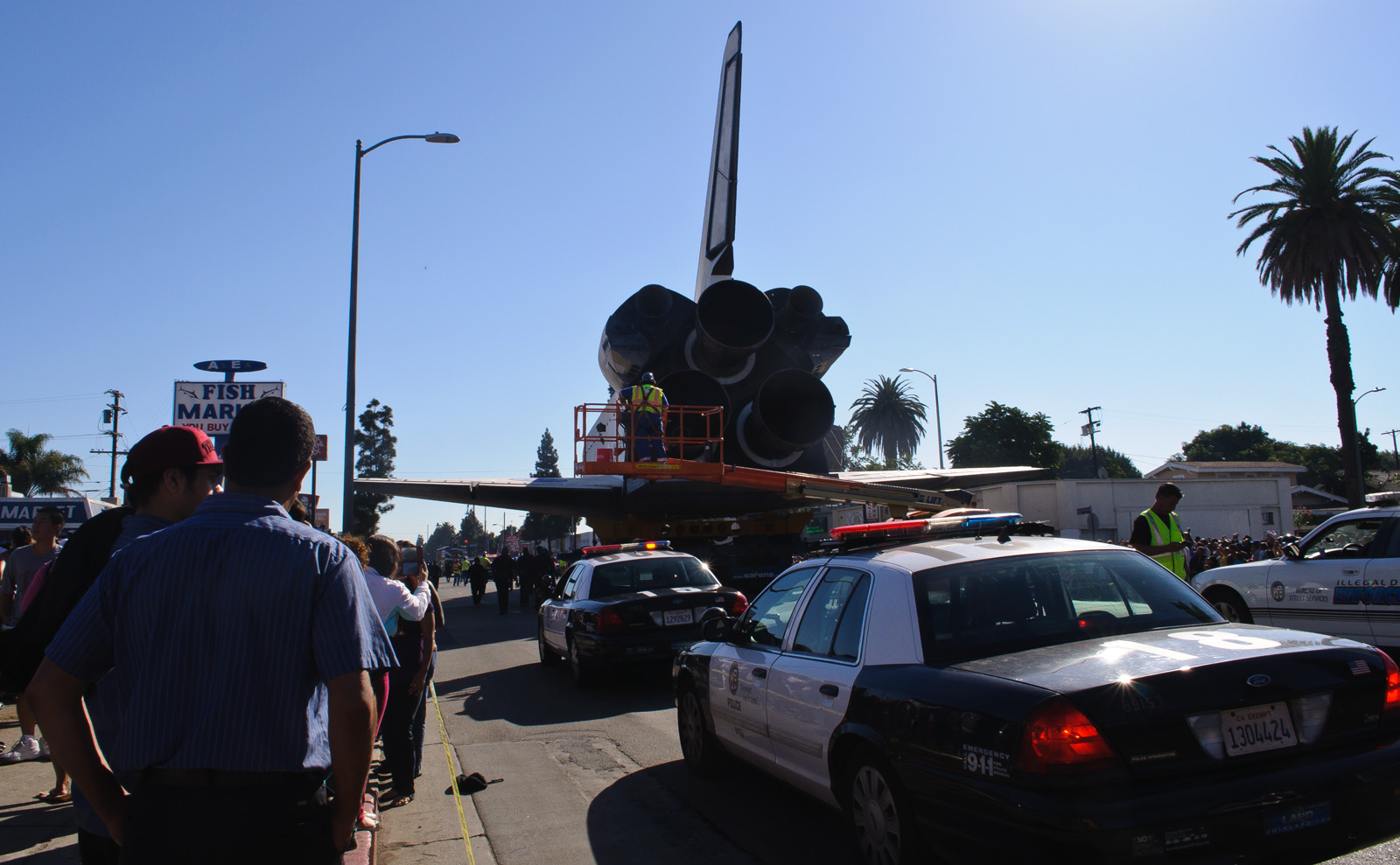
LAPD provides rolling traffic control for Space Shuttle Endeavour as it takes up the entire road

Depending on the role and need, law enforcement agencies may be used to provide physical security, act as a ceremonial honor guard, or as point and rearguard, providing a defensive perimeter by running ahead of the main body to clear the way so they can proceed unencumbered, and preventing potential threats from flanking. With some VIPs, it can a combination of all three

Municipal agencies may be used to provide security for local politicians and other public figures, assist national agencies in handling local logistics for visiting heads of state, or simply to escort other emergency vehicles in a time sensitive situation. They might also be used to sequester a jury or ensure that a suspect of a heinous crime receives their day in court, however an excessive presence by law enforcement can also backfire and be seen as performative.

For the funeral of a fellow police officer or popular public figure, or a parade in honor of an inauguration or a change in government, police officers might also be used as an honor guard, participating as active members of a procession. Their attendance could even be in a voluntary capacity as a show of force to signify support or appreciation of the individual being honored.

Private companies and organizations might request assistance in providing traffic control for their VIPs attending an event, in dealing with anticipated protests, or when transporting oversized or hazardous loads that exceed normal traffic limitations. Private individuals might request an escort for special events such as the funeral of a community leader, and are expecting a large funeral procession. These requests are often dependent on the availability of officers available to provide the service, evaluated to determine if there is a legitimate need for such services, and the individual or organization is typically charged for the officers' time and equipment required.

A police escort does not necessarily require officers to be at the side of the escorted individual(s), nor is it limited to a vehicular escort, it could conducted by officers on foot or even by boat. The purpose of a police escort is simply to ensure those that are being escorted get to their destination in a safe manner, and can be limited to a single officer enforcing a court order and accompanying an evicted tennant or individuals subjects of restraining orders to retrieve personal effects from their home.

== See also ==
- Civil–military relations
- Comitatus
- Convoy
- Police Motorcycle
- Posse Comitatus Act
- Traffic break
- Special Escort Group (Metropolitan Police)
- United States Capitol Police
