= UK Resilience Academy =

Coordinates: 54.10079°N 1.17887°W

- Type: Government training institution
- Established: 1989 (as Emergency Planning College)
- Parent institution: Cabinet Office (operated by Serco)
- Location: Easingwold, North Yorkshire, United Kingdom
- Campus: Hawkhills estate
- Website: ukresilienceacademy.org

The UK Resilience Academy formerly known as the Emergency Planning College and "the Hawkhills" foremost a college, based in the United Kingdom which is involved in activities to promote organisational resilience. Since 2010 the college has been operated on behalf of the Cabinet Office by Serco, delivering training approved by the Civil Contingencies Secretariat (CCS) of the Cabinet Office. The college buildings are located at Easingwold near York in England.

== College history ==
Since 1989, it has been the British Government's centre for running short seminars, workshops and courses on an inter–agency basis in the field of crisis management and emergency planning. The United Kingdom Warning and Monitoring Organisation disbanded in 1992. By 2000 the college was costing around £3 million per year to run, and was increasingly accommodating delegates from businesses. By 2003 there were 6,500 delegates attending courses, 10% of whom were from the private sector.

In 2010 the Home Office awarded the contract for running the college to Serco, with the contract valued at being worth around £55 million over 15 years.

== Staff ==
In 2003 Major-General Michael Charlton-Weedy was appointed as CEO.

In 2013, Kate Betts, director of Barnsley-based media and PR agency Capital B Media, was appointed by the college as an associate trainer and consultant.

== Hawkhills ==
The buildings were previously a private country house, then in 1937 the site was acquired by the Ministry of Works and became the second Home Office "Anti-Gas" School, as Britain prepared for the possibility of chemical warfare. The property went on to become a Civil Defence Corps training facility before eventually becoming the emergency planning college for the Home Office's F6 Emergency Planning Division.

== See also ==
- National Disaster and Emergency Management University
