= Save the President =

Board gane

Game board with geometric routes between White House and Capitol.

Save the President is a board game published by Games for Pleasure Ltd. in 1980.

== Description ==
Save the President is a game for 2–6 players that takes place on American Inauguration Day during the President-elect's motorcade travelling from the White House on a drive to the Capitol. Players are undercover agents for either the American or Russian governments and are tasked with either assassinating the President-elect or preventing the assassination.

=== Components ===
The game box contains:

- 23" x 20" game board
- 6 ID cards
- 48 agent counters (8 agents x 6 colours)
- counters for American and Russian Presidents (both wounded and unwounded)
- 104 Tradecreft cards
- 8 route control cards
- 6 Data sheets
- rule sheet
- 2 six-sided dice

=== Gameplay ===
At the start of the game, each player receives a facedown card that reveals which side they are on; this information is kept secret until the end of the game. The board, made up of a pattern of geometric shapes, represents the space between the White House and the Capitol. The route the motorcade takes is randomly determined. Each player has six agents and controls one board color, along which that player's agents can freely move. Players maneuver their agents on the board to try to set up an ambush, or to surround the President-elect, preventing an ambush. Various Tradecraft cards provide opportunities to bypass certain rules.

=== Ambush ===
In order to carry out an ambush, a Russian player must occupy one or more vertices of a shape adjacent to the motorcade. If another player's agent occupies one of the vertices, the ambushing player must invite the second player to aid in the attempt. The second player can now negotiate an agreement on how to split the points if the attempt is successful. An American player can bluff, trying to determine if the first player is actually a Russian agent, or if the first player is actually an American agent trying to determine if the second player is actually a Russian agent. The shape chosen and the number of vertices occupied determines the probability of success, which is rolled on the dice. The first successful assassination attempt wounds the President-elect, a second success is fatal.

=== Victory conditions ===
Russian players score points for participating in the wounding or killing of the President-elect. American players score points if the President-elect is alive when the motorcade reaches the Capitol. All players can possibly earn points for capturing enemy agents, but these points are not scored until the end of the game, when players' affiliations become known. If it is revealed that a player actually captured a friendly agent in error, the captured agent gets the points. The player with the most points wins the game.

=== Expansions ===
In 1996, Games for Pleasure released a small expansion for the game titled "Save the President: The Odd-Ball Scenario" that contains additional rules, more Tradecraft cards and revised data sheets.

== Reception ==
In Issue 25 of Imagine, Mike Perry was somewhat put off by the game designer's hyperbolic claims on the box cover, but he admitted that the game was "an interesting premise." Perry noted the less-than-professional quality of the components, but he liked the inclusion of data pamphlets for each player to aid in play. He concluded that "Overall, STP does not live up to its designer's extravagant claims, but it is a strong design, offering a diverting contest of bluff and chance."

== Reviews ==
- Gamesman #4
