= David Handley (farmer) =

David Handley is the leader of the militant pressure group Farmers for Action.

== Biography ==
He was a leader of the UK fuel protestors in September 2000. He unsuccessfully challenged for the leadership of the British National Farmers Union and was backed by senior Conservative Party activist Mark MacGregor.

In spite of this, he is still a popular and well-known figure among UK farmers, having twice been voted by readers of Farmers Weekly their Personality of the Year. In 2005, he was presented with the Dairy Industry Award. On 10 May 2007, he was presented with the Princess Royal Award for his significant contribution to the UK dairy industry by The Princess Royal at a private reception at Buckingham Palace. On 6 June 2012, Handley, who leads a group called Farmers for Action, was interviewed on the Today Programme about the price of milk. He said "we are looking at disruption of the milk supply, and that could come in many forms and this country is now running into something that is going to be very special to a lot of people, and that is the Olympic Games". He also said that "part of our action is likely to disrupt that".

In March 2016 Farmers For Action led by Handley marched in London joined by more than 5000 farmers, producers and supporters of British agriculture from across the UK, through Whitehall to 10 Downing Street to present a letter to David Cameron then PM, highlighting the crisis in British agriculture. He has spoken on a number of issues, including the uneconomic nature of dairy farming, having sold his dairy herd in 2015.

He continues, through his role as Chairman of Farmers For Action, campaigning on many issues concerning farmers and producers in the UK. He is still called upon by the media to comment on aspects affecting the farming industry and writes a fortnightly column in the South West newspaper Western Daily Press.

== See also ==
- Canadian agrarian activism
