= Traffic break =

Separation in the flow of traffic along a road or highway

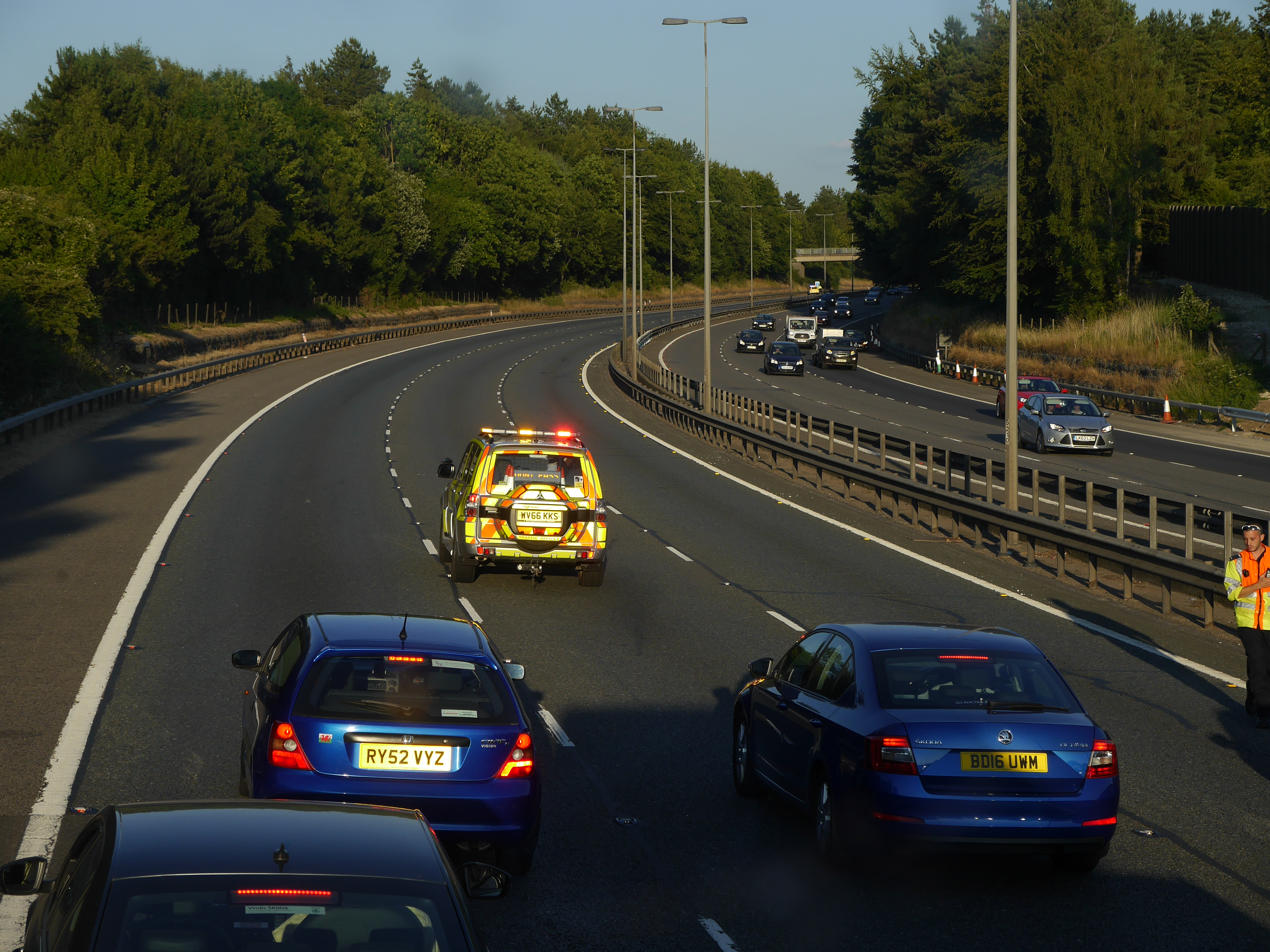
A break on the M40 motorway in England implemented by a National Highways traffic officer

A traffic break is any separation in the flow of traffic—naturally occurring or otherwise—along a road or highway. In heavily congested traffic, natural breaks occur rarely, thus the term traffic break most commonly refers to the manual separation of traffic, normally conducted by highway patrol officers.

Most such traffic breaks are used to clear a hazardous obstruction from the road or to allow a stalled vehicle to safely make its way off the road and onto the shoulder. For example, a highway patrol officer may arrive at the site of the accident and then radio to another officer to initiate a traffic break. The second officer enters traffic before the site of the accident, turns on their warning lights, and begins weaving across multiple lanes to signal that other drivers are to slow down and remain behind the officer. The speed to which the officer slows is based on the amount of time needed to clear the accident ahead. An officer may completely stop traffic to yield larger separation. The second officer then radios ahead to the first officer, who is still at the site of the accident, and gives them a description of the last vehicle traveling ahead at regular speeds. The first officer will use this information to determine when it is safe to move the accident off the road and onto the shoulder.

Traffic breaks may also be conducted to gradually slow traffic in preparation for a large accident ahead that has caused traffic to stop abruptly. This greatly reduces the chance of subsequent crashes due to motorists not braking in time. Other traffic breaks may give time for construction activities to be completed uninterrupted. Some construction requires equipment that obstructs the flow of traffic to a point that it becomes a major hazard to have traffic trying to travel around them, such as adjusting the placement of a traffic sign, (re)striping lane markers, or sweeping the roadway. Alternatively, some construction would produce dangerous conditions to passing vehicles, such as blasting. In rare circumstances, civilian motorists have initiated traffic breaks. In 2004, one Alameda County man ran a traffic break to aid in the emergency landing of a small Cessna 172 on Interstate 580.

When a single traffic break does not allow sufficient time to complete a task, multiple breaks may be conducted in series. This practice is called "running a round-robin".

== Rolling roadblock ==
During times of high congestion, risky driving, or dangerous road conditions, law enforcement may institute so-called "rolling roadblocks," where official vehicles line up across the road and drive at a set speed. Since anyone attempting to pass them would be doing so on the shoulder and thereby garnering a ticket from the officer, traffic speeds are kept at the desired level.

Rolling roadblocks have also been used by motorists as a form of protest, for example during the fuel protests in the United Kingdom, or in 2019 by French farmers in tractors.

== Traffic breaks by vehicles other than automobiles ==
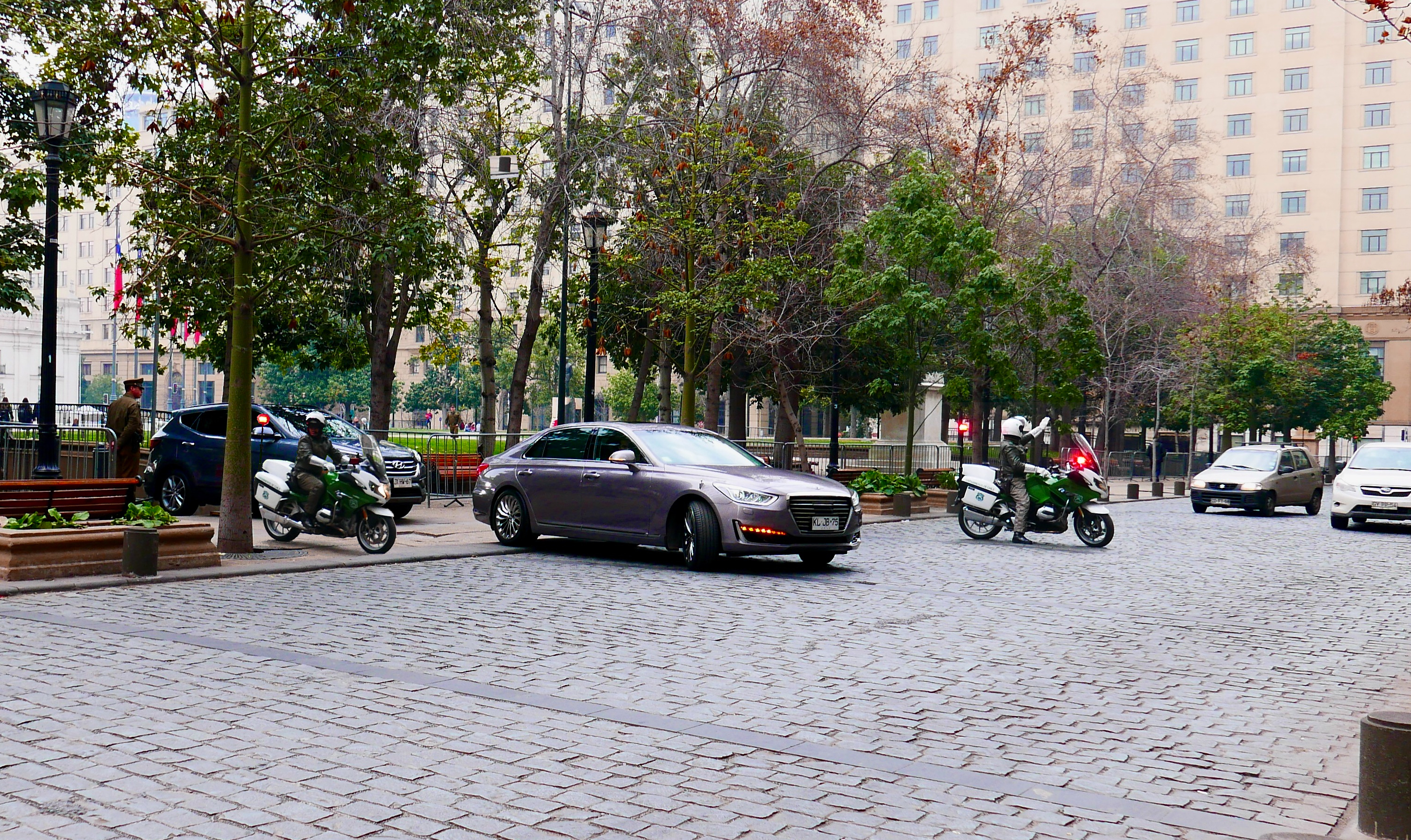
Chilean Carabineros block traffic while escorting a VIP in Santiago

Police motorcycle are frequently used in police escorts due to their ability to split lanes and travel ahead of the main body to block cross traffic in an intersection ahead, allowing the motorcade to pass through, then taking up the rear as the formerly rear officer leapfrogs ahead to block the next intersection.

Some traffic breaks have been initiated by other vehicles. For example, a motorboat initiated a traffic break in the Rivière des Prairies to keep marine traffic away from police operations following a helicopter prison escape from the Saint-Jérôme Detention Facility in 2013. This practice is often used by coast guard and port police units to prevent recreational boaters from interfering with a boat parade or race, crossing in front of an encumbered vessel unable to easily maneuver in a narrow channel, or preventing potential terrorists from approaching.

Additionally, military aircraft may be used to enforce temporary flight restrictions, especially if a ground stop is issued due to a national security incident such as following the September 11 attacks in the United States, or other temporarily prohibited airspace is declared for an event such as the Super Bowl, or the presence of high value political targets that amateur general aviation pilots might not be aware of.

In fiction, Thomas the Tank Engine initiated a traffic break by rapidly shifting between tracks to keep his competitors from winning a hypothetical stunt competition.

== See also ==
- Road traffic control
- Traffic barrier
