= WHCA Roadrunner =

Vehicle in the American presidential motorcade

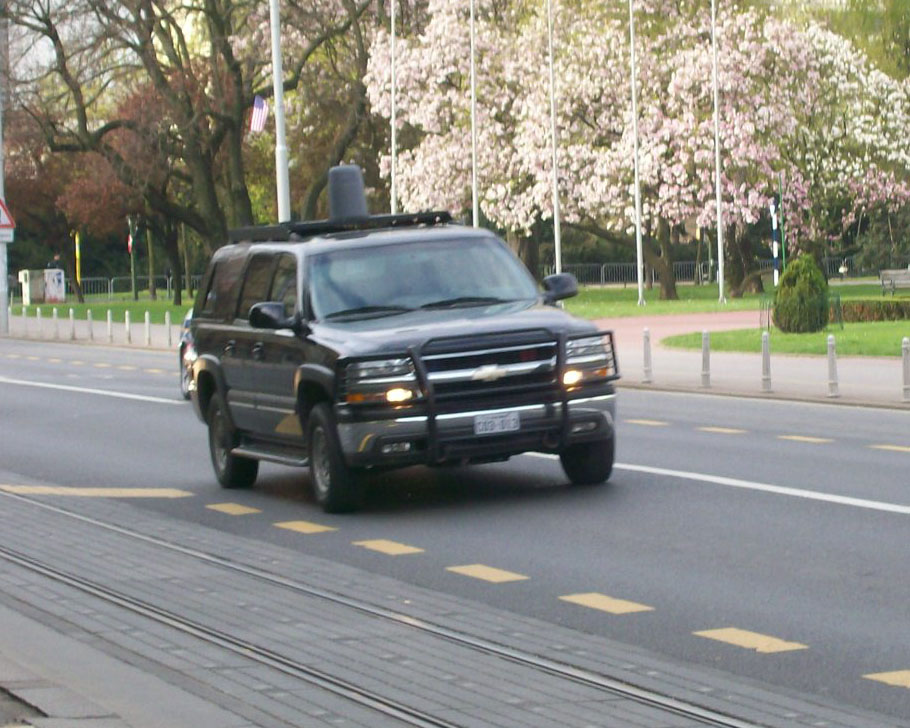
WHCA Roadrunner vehicle (2008)

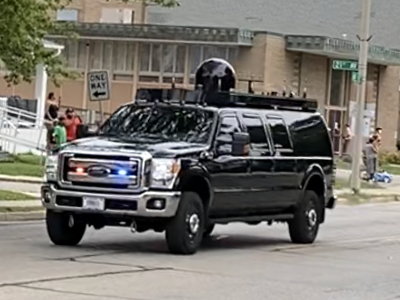
WHCA Roadrunner vehicle (2020)

The White House Communications Agency Roadrunner vehicle is an element of every American presidential motorcade. It is also known as the MC2V (mobile command and control vehicle). The vehicle serves as the communications hub for the motorcade by encrypting duplex radio and streaming video which in turn is beamed up to a military satellite which in turn beams that data back down to a ground entry point and through to the WHCA switchboard.

The vehicle is a heavily modified Chevrolet Suburban (Ford F-350 Super Duty since 2018) equipped with protective armor, runflat tires, vehicle transponder, and turbocharger. The most obvious feature is a configurable antennae platform mounted on the roof. This contains a large SATCOM dome containing a tracking dish that serves as the data uplink and downlink as the primary communications path for the motorcade. Also on the roof are smaller VHF antennas that serve as a repeater for the other motorcade elements as well as another communications path to local authorities and the onsite White House Communications Agency office. VHF antennae configuration changes according to the mission operational requirements. This also serves as the hub for the LCP or Limousine Control Package that allows C2 functions to be performed from USSS control cars, presidential parade limo or presidential suburban. 22 of these vehicles were built by Assurance Technology Corporation in Carlisle, MA and developed with NRL (Naval Research Laboratory).

The primary communications path was via the Defense Satellite Communications System (DSCS) III (U) satellite. There were nine of these satellites in orbit, each one providing six super-high-frequency encrypted data and voice channels and a single channel dedicated for Emergency Action Messages which would be used to direct a nuclear release from the motorcade.
