= Luther Pendragon =

London-based public relations and communications agency

Luther Pendragon Limited
- Company type: Subsidiary
- Industry: Communications
- Founded: 1 August 1991; 34 years ago in London, England
- Headquarters: London, United Kingdom
- Number of locations: London; Brussels; United States
- Key people: Simon Whale (Managing Director)
- Services: Public relations
- Website: luther.co.uk

Luther Pendragon Limited is a London and New York-based public relations and communications agency.

== History ==
Founded in 1992 by media journalist George Pitcher and television journalist Charles Stewart-Smith, and so named due to Pitcher's interest in Arthurian legends, the firm grew through the 1990s off the back of major and often controversial clients such as British Gas, Kimberly Clark, Holocaust Memorial Day and the Hinduja family. The company handles all media inquiries for the London and Winchester dioceses of the Church of England. Luther Pendragon lays claim to having developed the professional practice of issues management, but this is disputed in the PR industry.

In 2004 ex-civil servant Mike Granatt joined the consultancy. His clients included the Speaker of the House of Commons Michael Martin, a position from which Granatt resigned in February 2008, saying he had been misled over a scandal involving the Speaker's expenses. One of his clients in 2007 was the BBC Trust.

In 2005, the firm was subject to a management buy-out, said to be worth £11 million by the trade magazine PR Week. Current clients include Reuben Brothers.

== Clients ==
- Diocese of London
- Diocese of Winchester
- Clariant
- Vizada

== See also ==
- Reputation Management
- Public Relations
- Crisis Management
- Corporate Strategy
- Media training
