= Bruce Mann (civil servant) =

British civil servant

Bruce Mann, a senior British civil servant, held roles in the Ministry of Defence (MOD) and Cabinet Office.

Mann joined the MOD in 1979. He variously served as Director of European Policy, Director of Resources and Plans, and Director General (Financial Management).

He became the official Head of the Civil Contingencies Secretariat of the Cabinet Office on 1 September 2004.

Mann became Finance Director of the Cabinet Office in 2010, a role he held until 2015. Between 2012 and 2016, he also served as executive director of the Cabinet Office's Government Property Unit.

Mann was appointed to the Board of the University of Plymouth in April 2017.
