= Farmers for Action =

Farmers organisation in the UK

- Abbreviation: FFA
- Founded: May 2000; 25 years ago

Farmers for Action (FFA) is a lobby group representing farmers in the United Kingdom.

== History ==
It was founded in Worcestershire in May 2000 by David Handley. Handley has been the only person to hold the position of chairman since the FFA was established.

The group has been described by some as militant due to its proactive protest strategy. In 2016, the FFA organised marches on Westminster to protest low farm-gate prices. In 2024, FFA representatives from Northern Ireland traveled to London to join Save British Farming in a massive tractor protest.

In January 2026, Farmers For Action participated in a protest in London opposing proposed changes to farm inheritance tax, staging a demonstration in Parliament Square that included tractors and farmers attending the parliamentary debate on the issue. A representative of the organisation stated that the protest coincided with extended House of Commons discussions on the inheritance tax bill.

== See also ==
- National Farmers' Union of England and Wales
