= Motorcade =

Procession of official vehicles, often VIP limousines

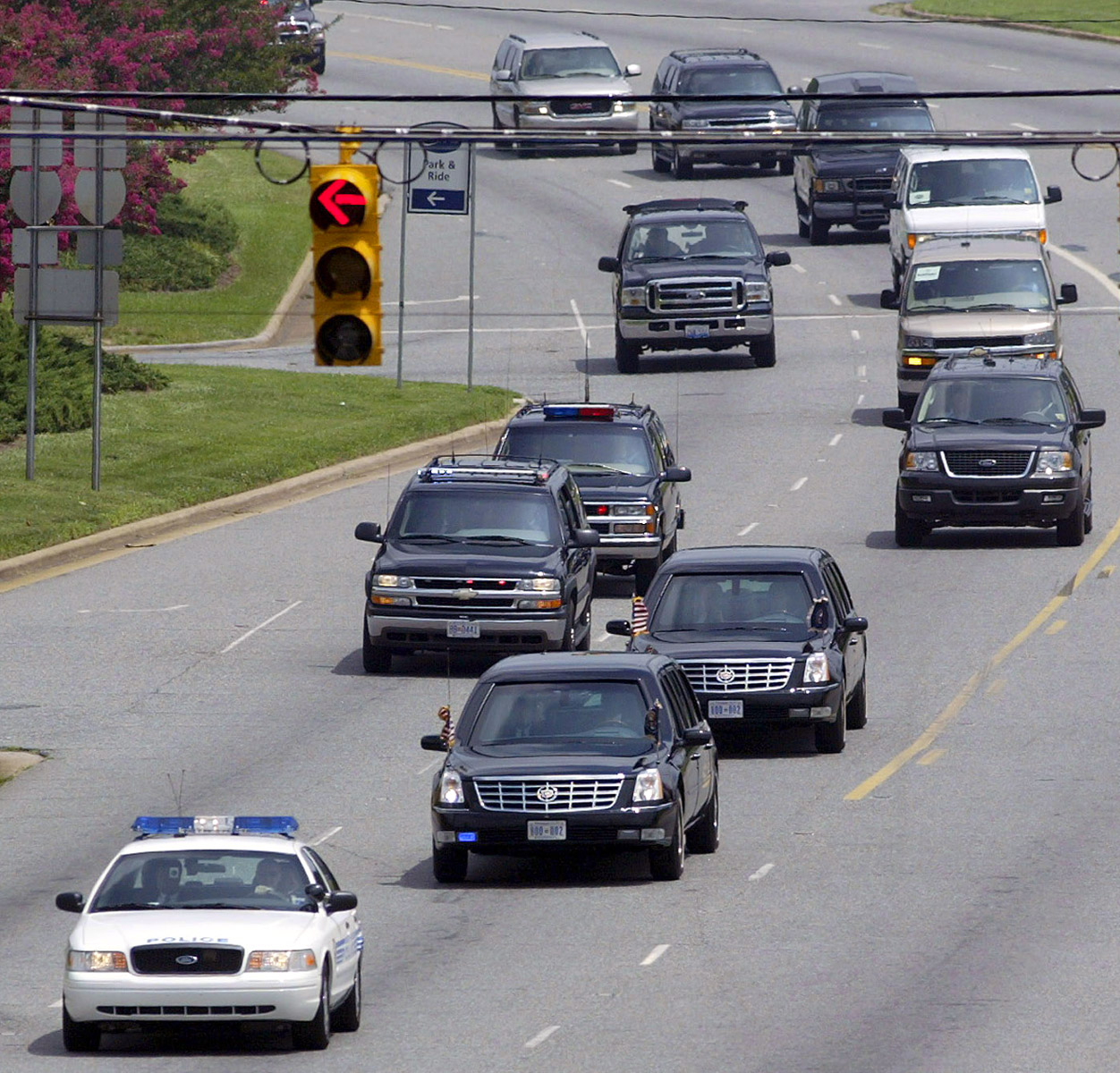
Motorcade transporting U.S. President George W. Bush in Charlotte, North Carolina, 2005

A motorcade, or autocade, is a procession of motor vehicles, which can be used for ceremonial processions, funerals or demonstrations, or to provide security while transporting a very important person. The American presidential motorcade is an example of both and is a staple of public appearances by the president of the United States.

== Etymology ==
The term motorcade was coined by Lyle Abbot (in 1912 or 1913 when he was automobile editor of the Arizona Republican), and is formed after cavalcade, playing off of the last syllable in that word. The original suffix in cavalcade is actually "-ade", and there is no "-cade" in either French or Latin. -cade has since become a productive suffix in English, leading to the alternative names carcade, autocade, and even Hoovercade (after J. Edgar Hoover) as a suffix meaning "procession". Eric Partridge called the name a "monstrosity", and Lancelot Hogben considered the word to be a "counterfeit coinage".

== Uses of motorcades ==
=== Funerals ===
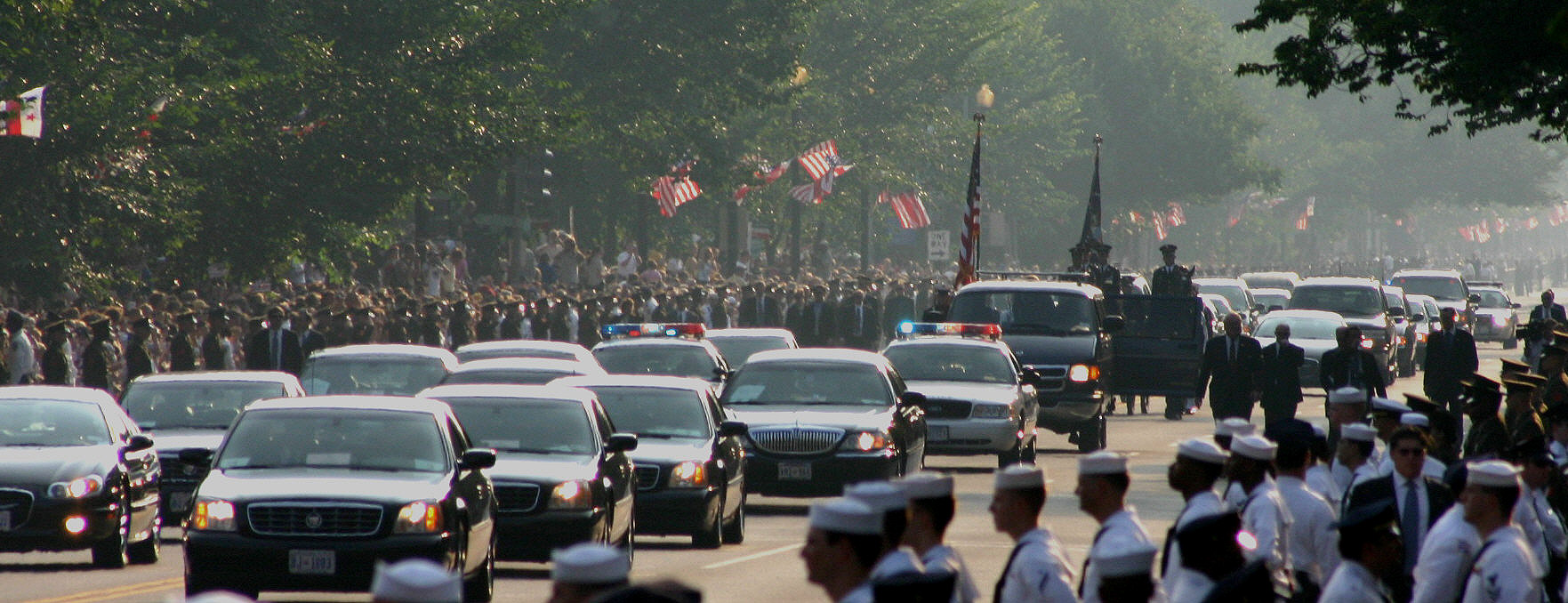
Funeral motorcade for Ronald Reagan in Washington, D.C., 2004

A funeral cortege is a procession of mourners, most often in a motorcade of vehicles following a hearse.

=== Protests and demonstrations ===
Motorcades can be used as protests and demonstrations. A large, organised, group of vehicles will travel a busy route at very slow speed in order to deliberately cause traffic disruption. This is a tactic most often associated with protest groups that have access to many large vehicles, such as truckers and farmers. An example is the 2005 UK protests against fuel prices. As part of the Euromaidan protests in Ukraine in November 2013—February 2014, the sub-movement that made use of car processions as the means of protest was called the Automaidan.

Russian people and their advocates supporting the 2022 Russian invasion organised motorcades in Germany, Serbia and Greece.

=== VIPs ===
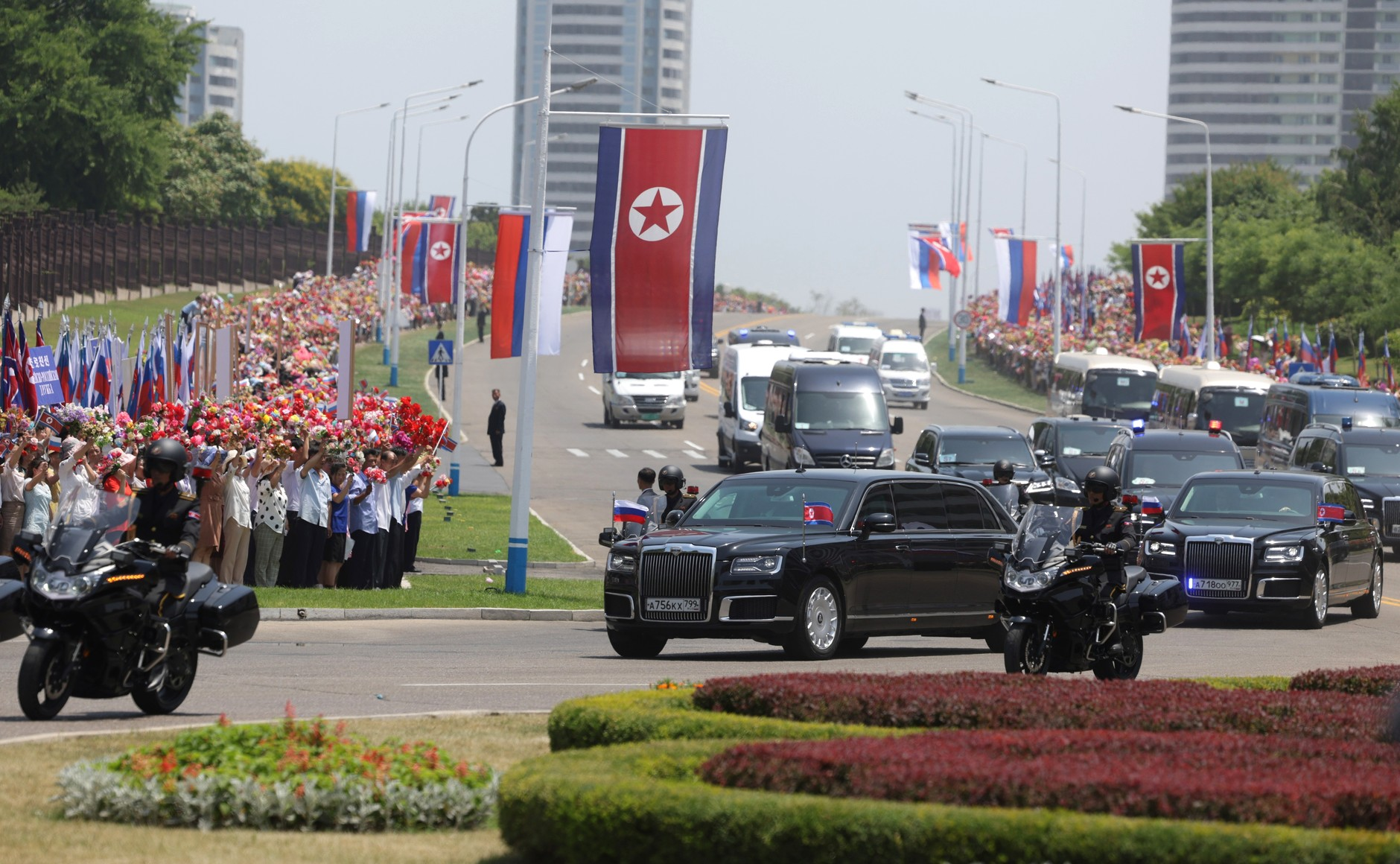
Motorcade transporting Russian President Vladimir Putin in Pyongyang, North Korea, 2024

Motorcades can be used to transport a very important person, usually a political figure. Such a procession consists of several vehicles, usually accompanied by law enforcement support and additional protection to ensure the safety of the people in the motorcade. Motorcades for heads of government and heads of state can consist of dozens of vehicles, those being armoured cars, SUVs, and police motorcycles and cars leading the way and following.

==== Traffic diversions ====
Depending on the size of the motorcade and who it is carrying, routes may be completely blockaded from the general public. For security, this often occurs for motorcades for heads of state or government.

== President of the United States ==
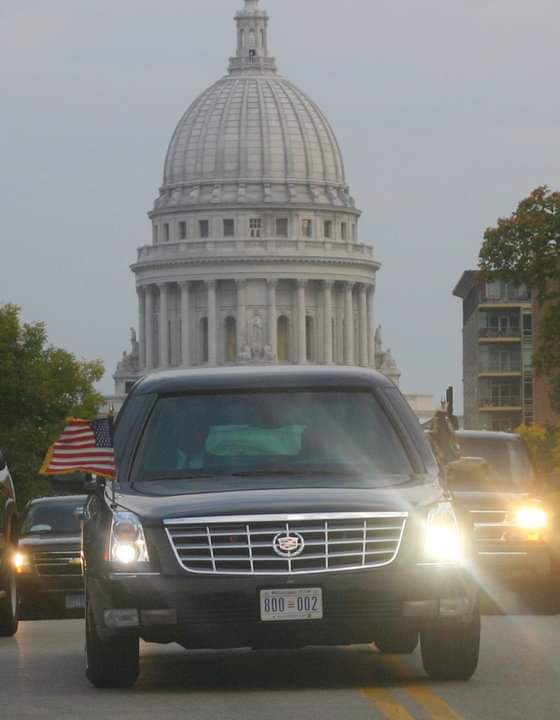
President Obama's Motorcade in Madison, Wisconsin, 2008

The motorcade for the President of the United States comprises forty to fifty vehicles; in addition to the president, the motorcade may carry his or her spouse or children, members of the press, security, White House officials, and VIP guests. The major members travel in armored vehicles, typically specially configured limousines. The motorcade contains several armored vehicles, a USSS Electronic Countermeasures Suburban, a counter-assault team, and Secret Service agents. When called for, a hazardous materials team precedes the motorcade on alert for potential hazards.

Police vehicles and motorcycles typically travel ahead of the presidential motorcade to help clear the route and manage traffic. Officers coordinate with the Secret Service during these operations.

The motorcade for the president is made up of two parts, the first being the "secure package". In the event of an emergency, the secure package separates from the rest of the group. It includes two limousines heavily guarded by local law enforcement and Secret Service, with all cars driven by professional drivers.

The second part is made up of vans that transport White House staff members and selected members of the press. In the rear is the WHCA Roadrunner special communications van – which provides the primary communications path via satellite, allowing bi-directional voice, data and streaming video– an ambulance, and additional police vehicles.

Motorcade routes are coordinated and selected by Secret Service agents in cooperation with local police forces or US military in war-torn countries. For example when the president visited troops in Afghanistan, US military troops provided security to the motorcade. Escape routes are also established in the event of an emergency.

== President of South Korea ==
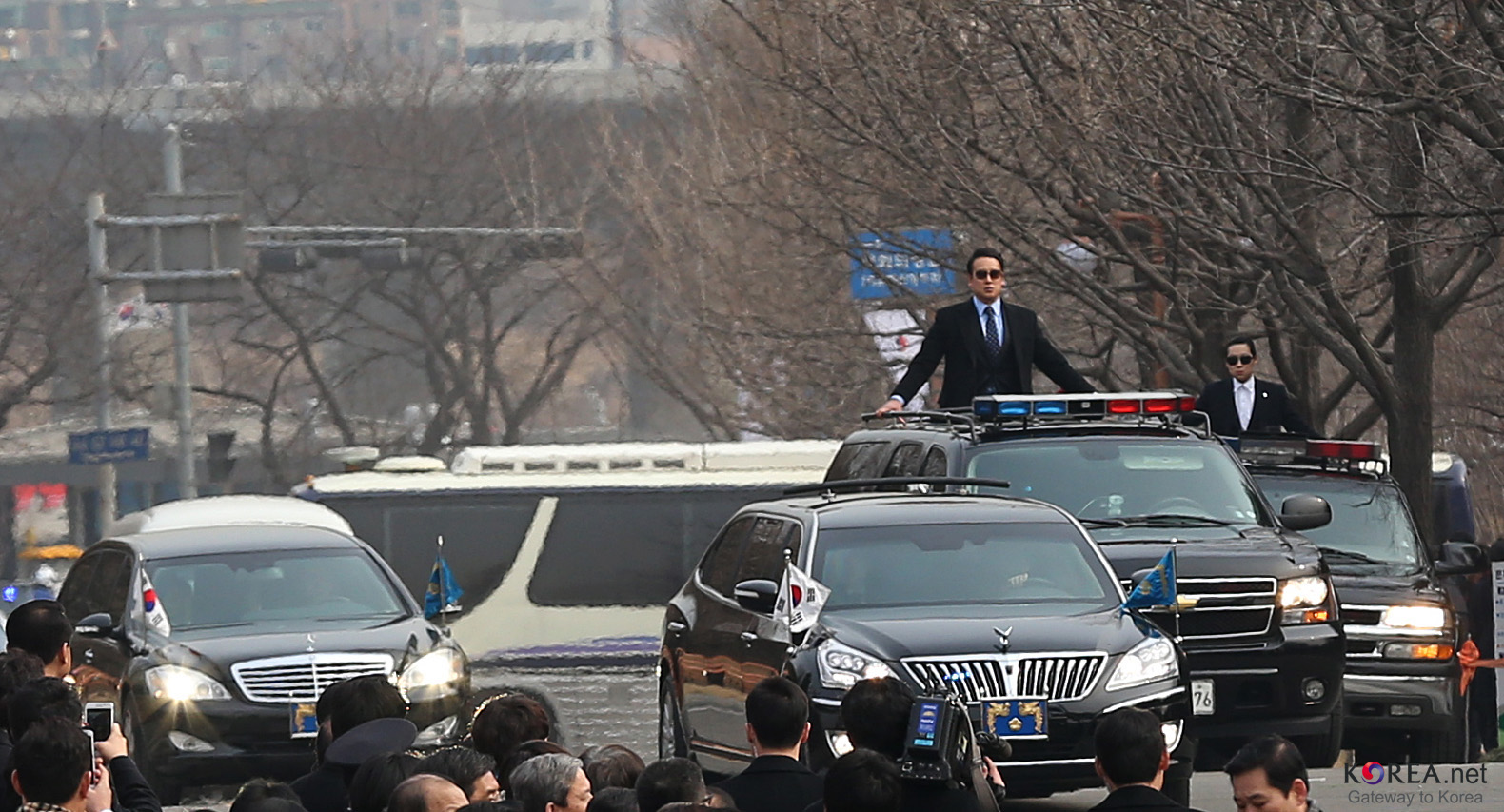
Motorcade transporting President Park Geun-Hye during her inauguration in Seoul, 2013

The motorcade for the President of South Korea comprises twenty to thirty vehicles; in addition to the president, the motorcade may carry their spouse, members of the press, security, Blue House officials, VIP guests, family, friends and cabinet members. High ranking cabinet members travel in armored vehicles, typically specially configured limousines or armored Cadillac Escalades. The motorcade contains several armored vehicles of different car brands, with a counter-assault team, Presidential Security Service agents, medical teams, police escorts from the Korean National Police Agency and other unknown unmarked vehicles.

The police escort usually precedes the Presidential motorcade to clear the way, block traffic and shut down the streets for the motorcade.

The motorcade is divided into two different parts, the first half being the part of the motorcade carrying the president and their spouse the second half carrying Blue House staff, more security and the press.

Many people most notably saw the Korean presidential motorcade during the first Inter-Korean summit at the DMZ on the Korean border, where the leaders of the two Koreas met for the first time.

The routes for the motorcade are selected by the Presidential Security Service agents with cooperation with local police forces. There is always an emergency route set in case of any emergencies before the President goes anywhere.

== Gallery of motorcades ==
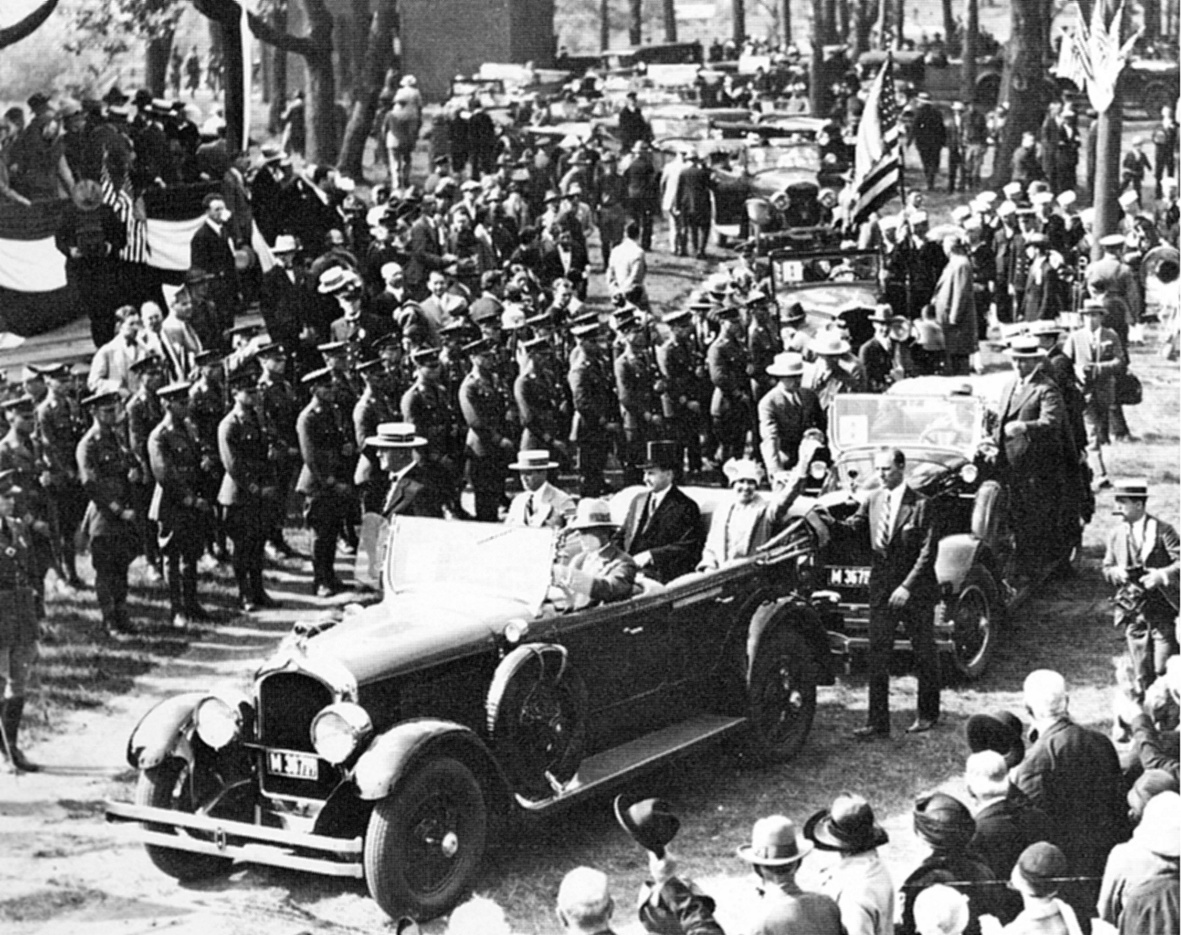
Calvin Coolidge (in top hat) arrives to dedicate a park in Hammond, Indiana, 1927

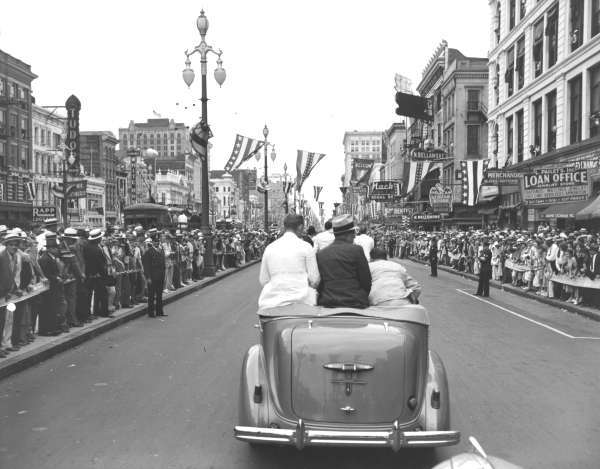
Franklin D. Roosevelt in New Orleans, 1937

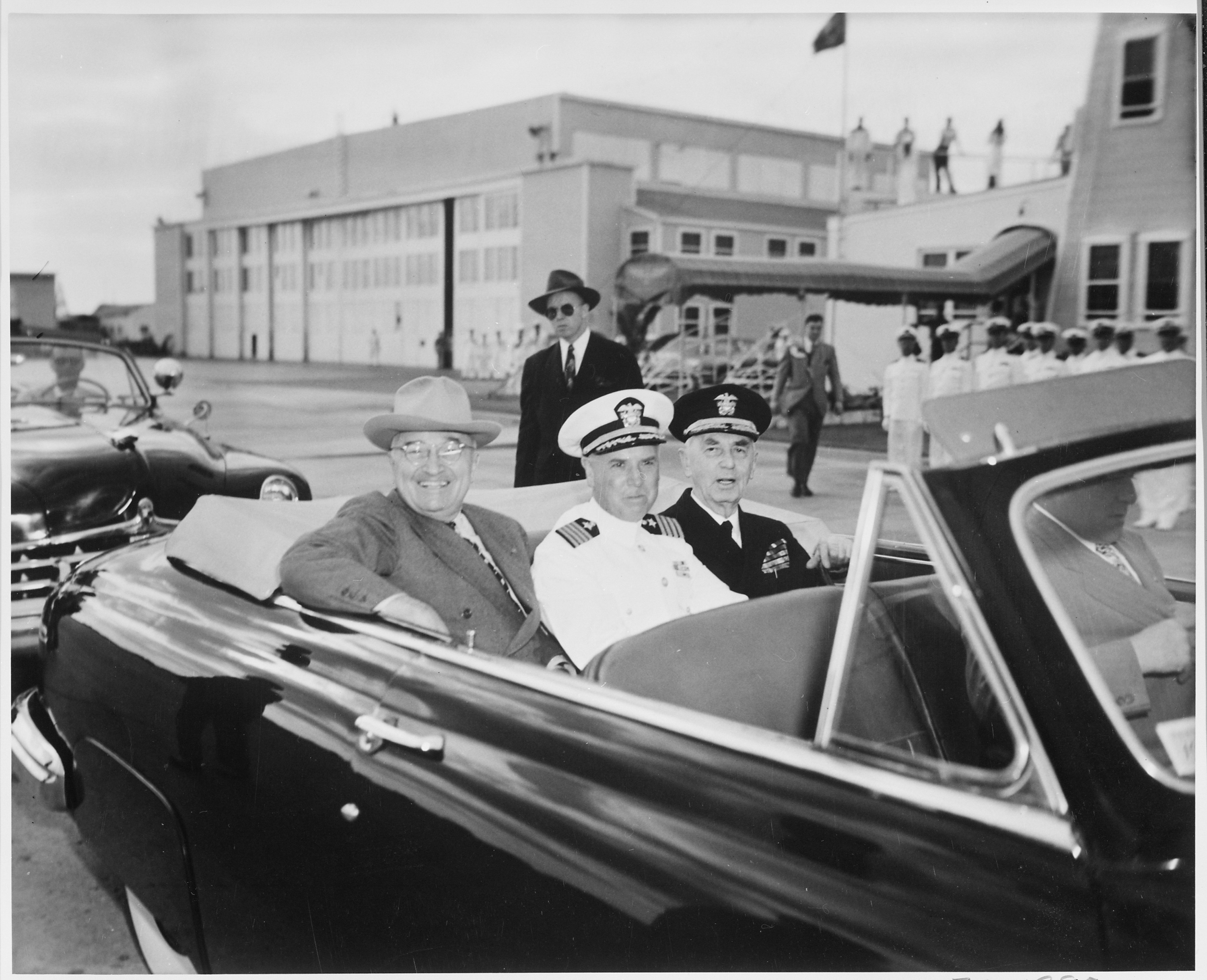
Harry S. Truman leaves Boca Chica Field in Key West, Florida, with Cecil C. Adell (center), and William D. Leahy, retired Chief of Staff to the Commander in Chief, 1951

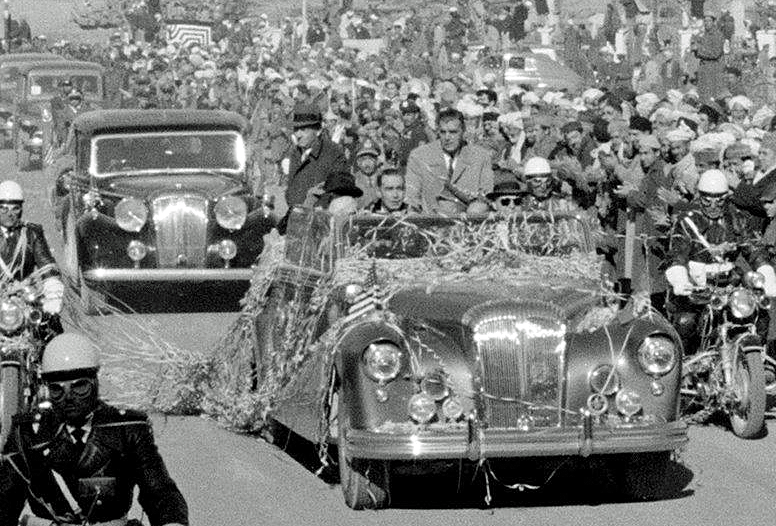
Dwight D. Eisenhower in Kabul, 1959

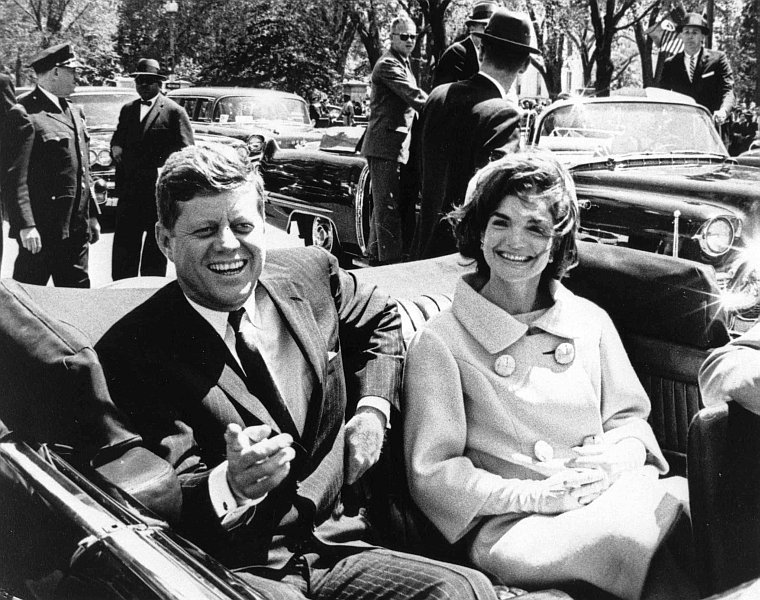
John F. Kennedy and Jacqueline Kennedy at Blair House, 1961

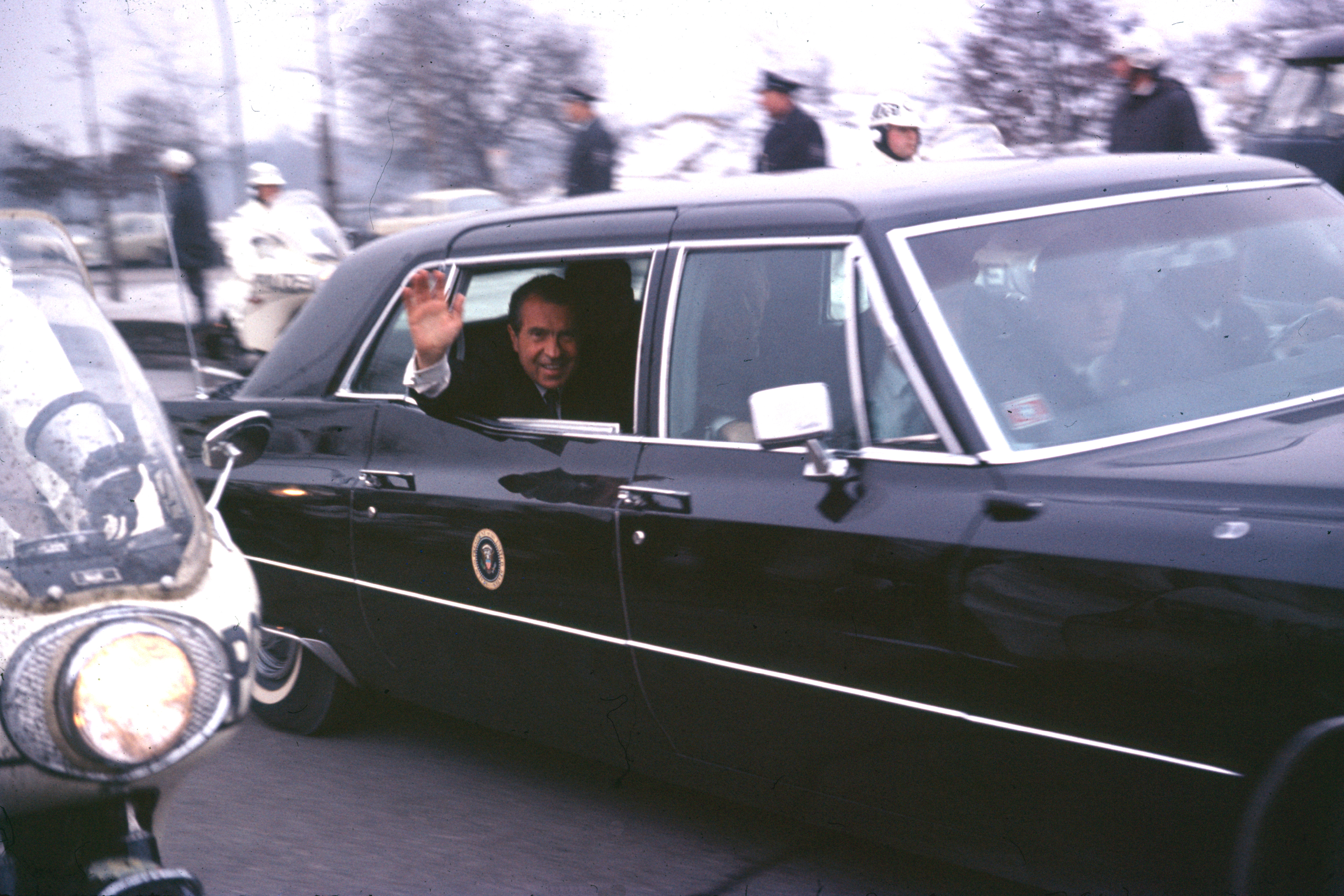
Richard Nixon in Berlin, 1969

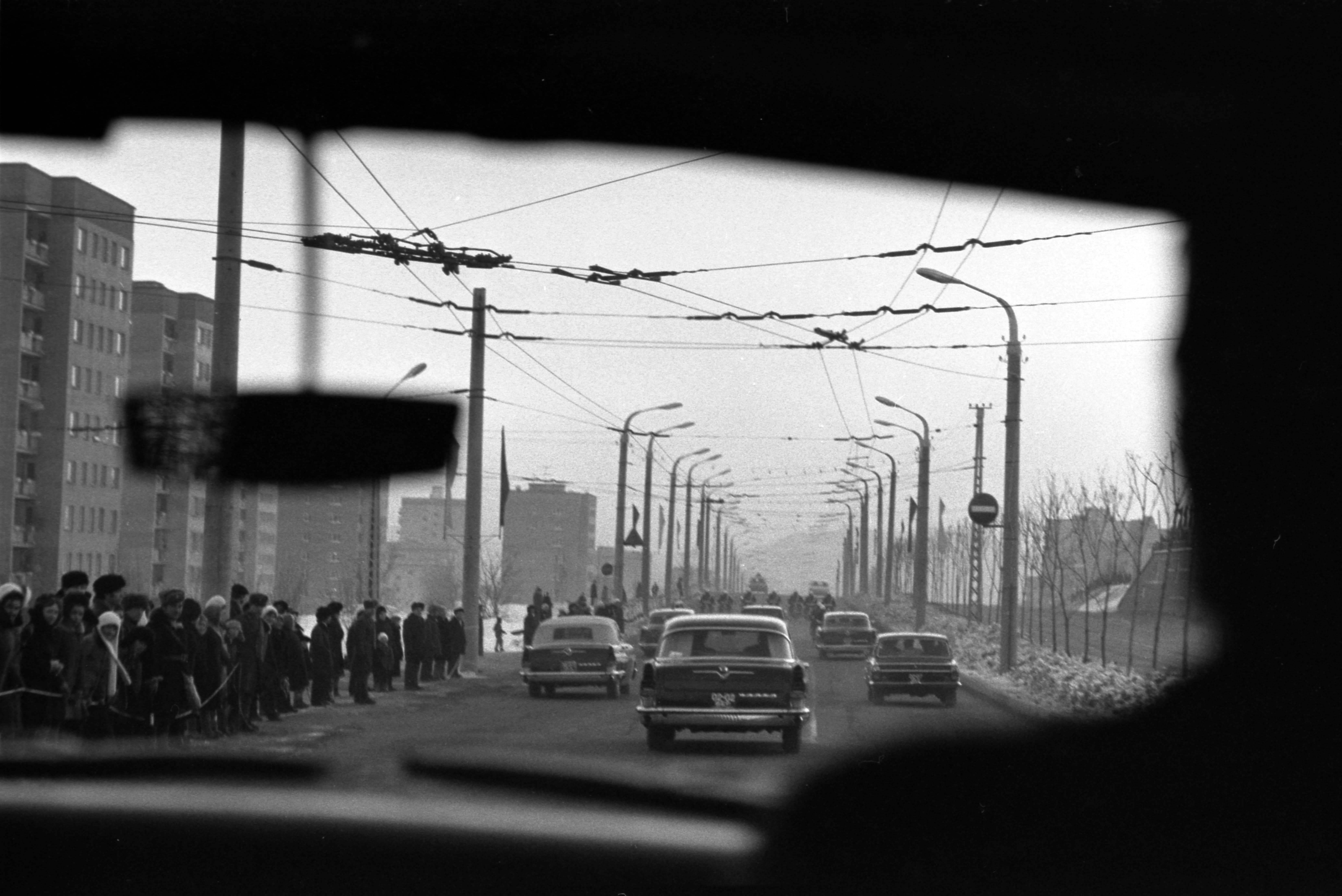
Following Gerald Ford and Leonid Brezhnev on a tour of Vladivostok, 1974. Photo by David Hume Kennerly.

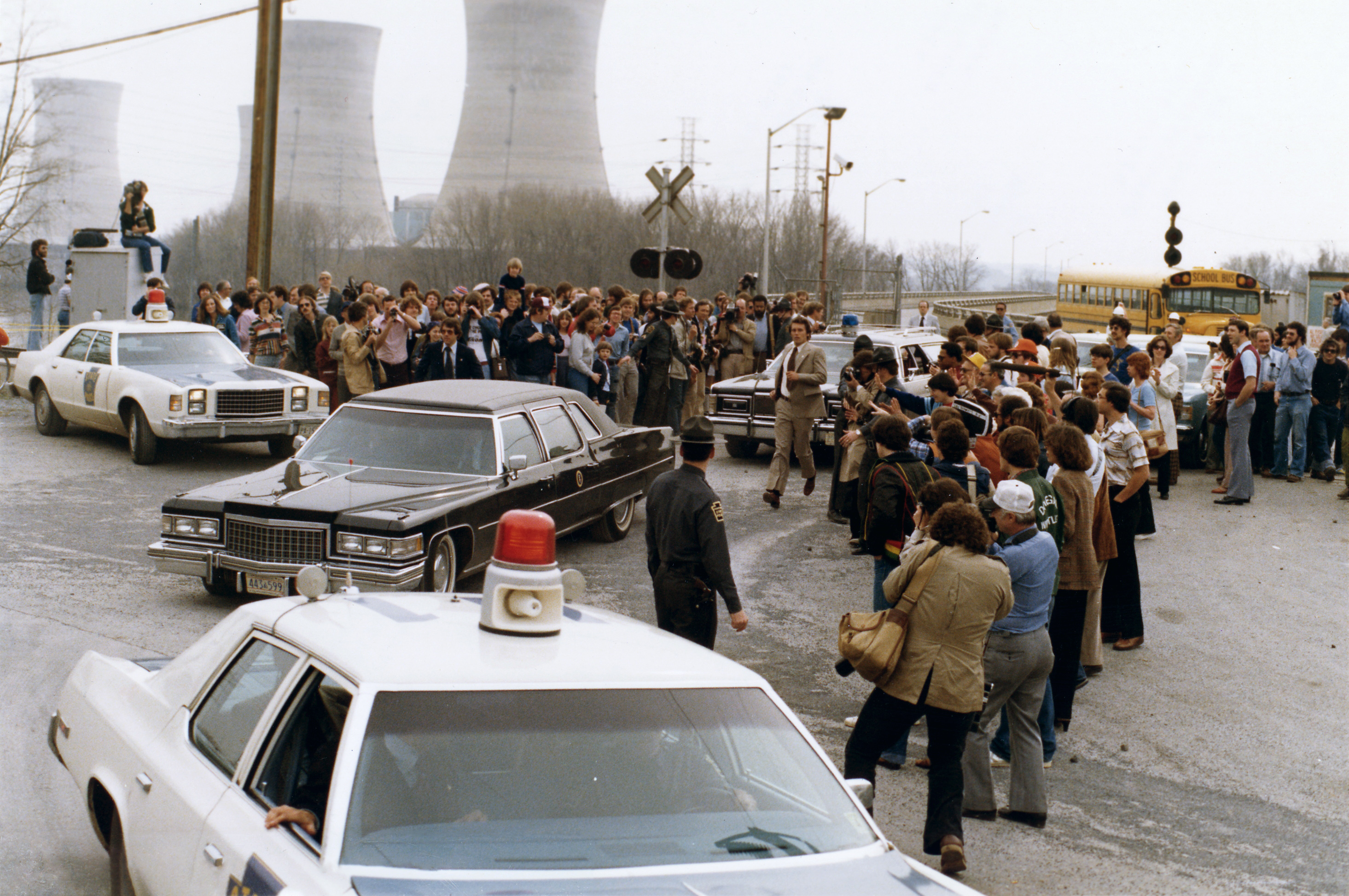
Jimmy Carter leaving Three Mile Island, 1979

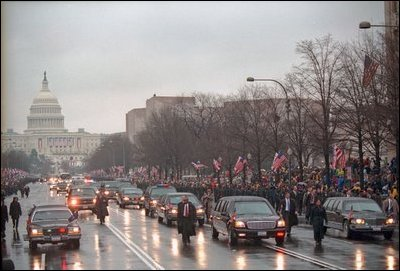
Motorcade following the inauguration of George W. Bush, 2001

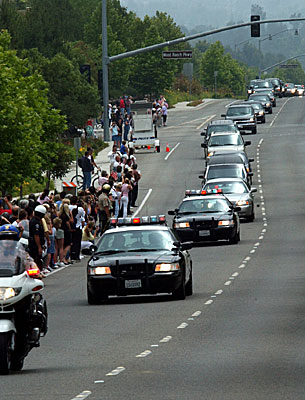
Funeral motorcade for Ronald Reagan in Simi Valley, California, 2004

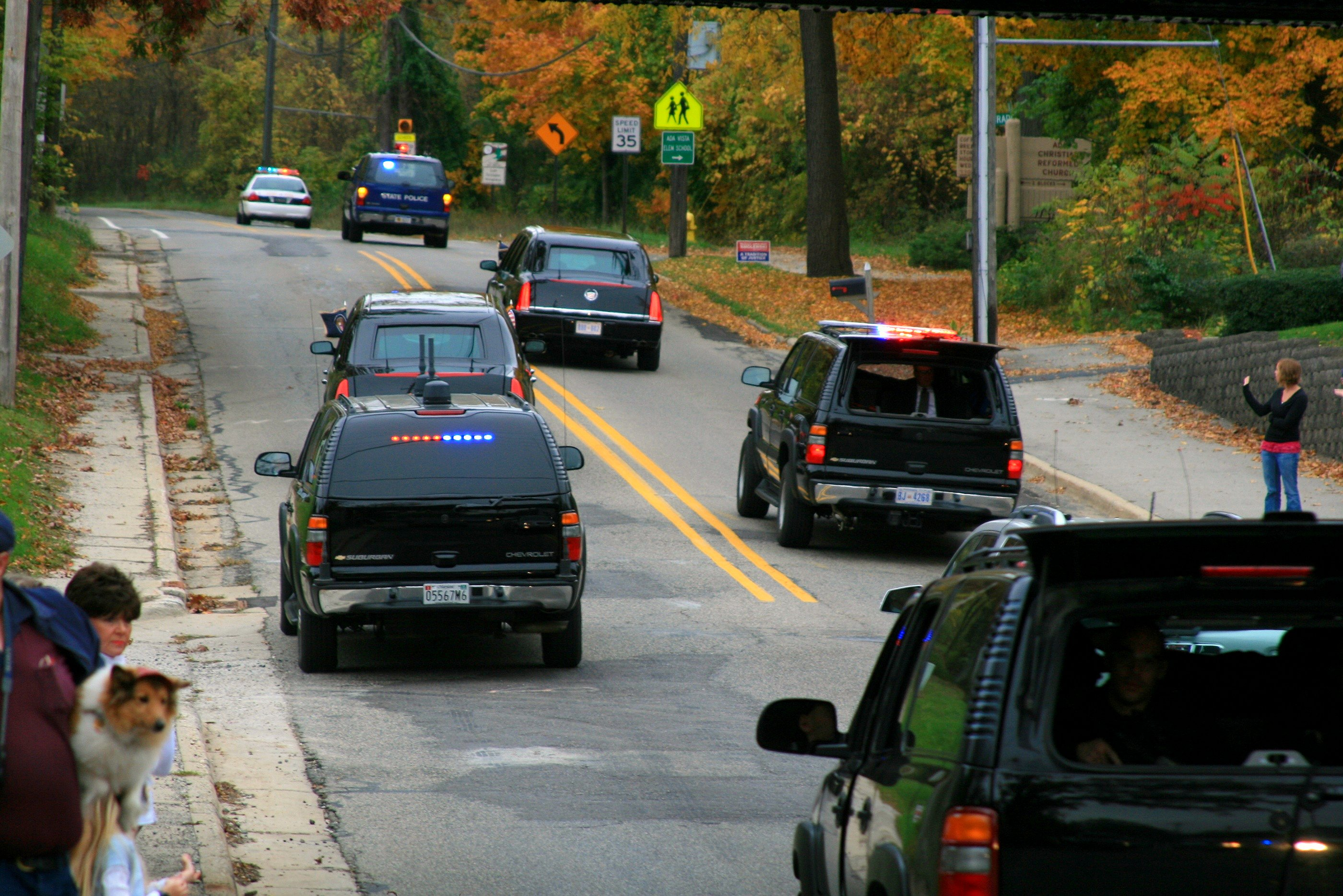
George W. Bush in Ada, Michigan, 2008

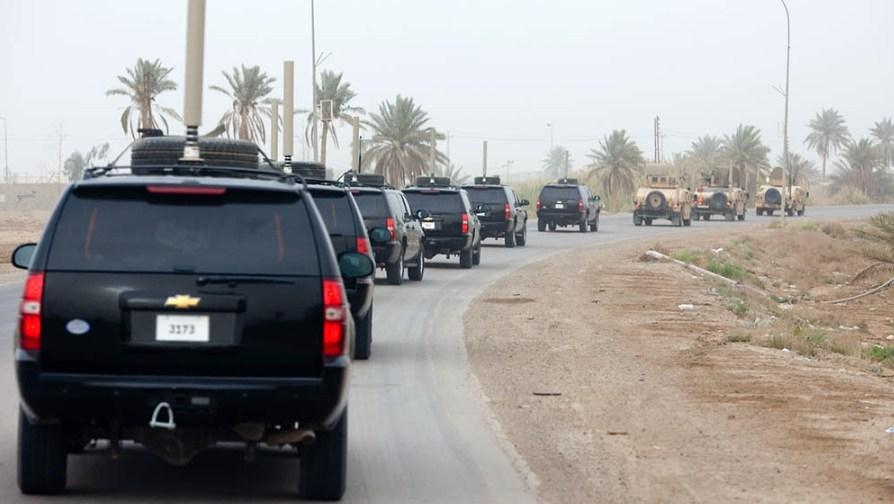
Barack Obama in Baghdad, 2009

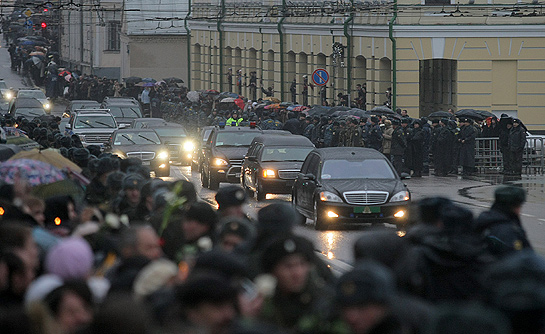
Funeral motorcade of Russian patriarch Alexy II in 2008

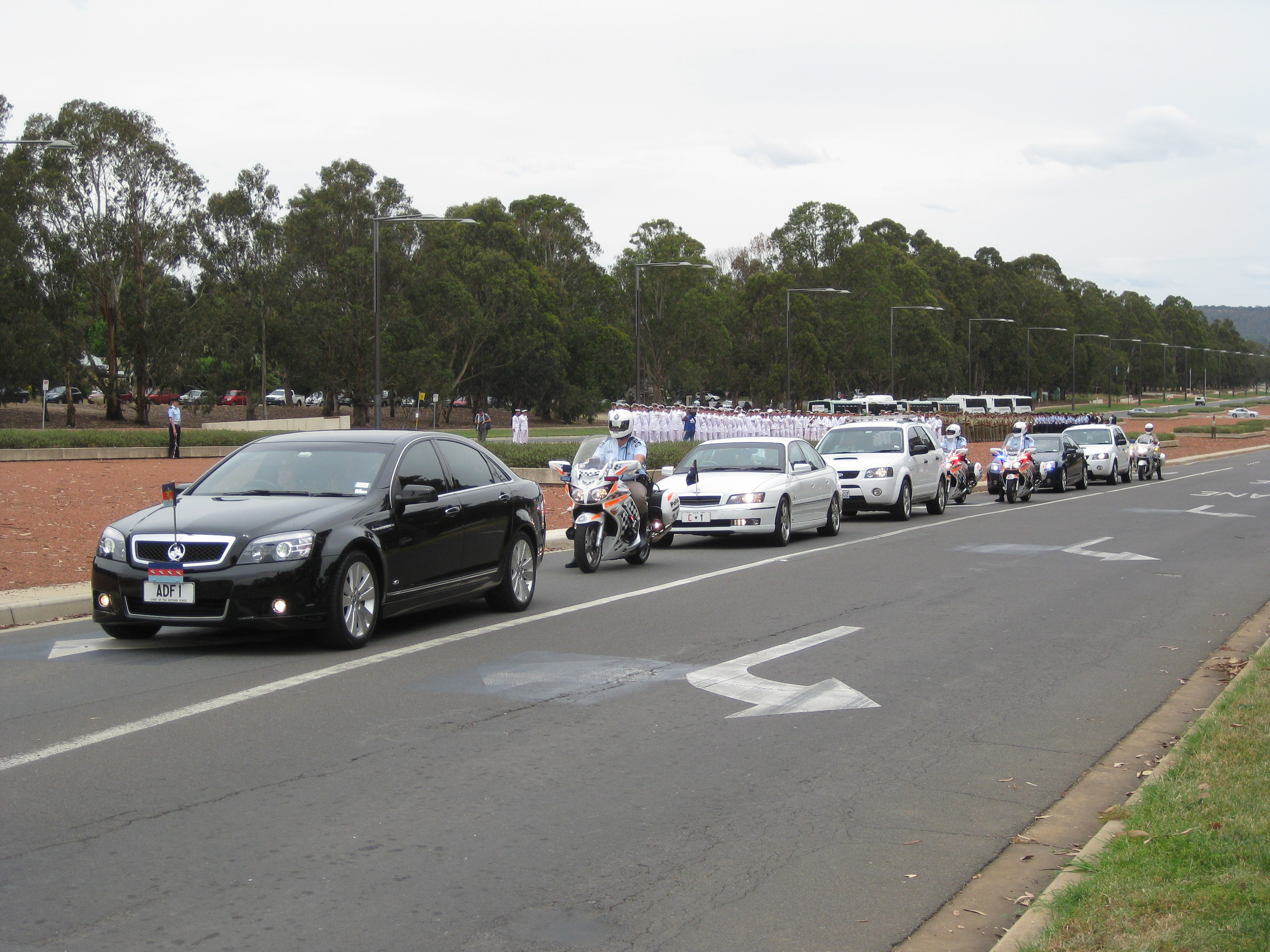
Motorcade for the Australian Governor General, Prime Minister and Chief of the Defence Force in Canberra, 2009

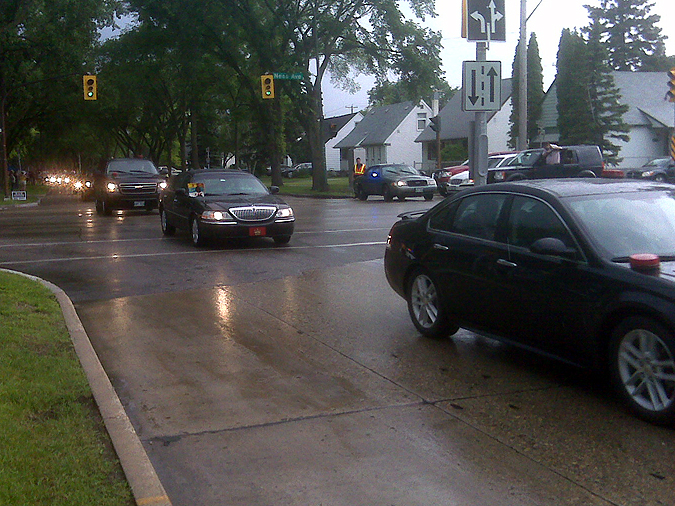
Motorcade for Queen Elizabeth II, en route to CFB Winnipeg, 2010

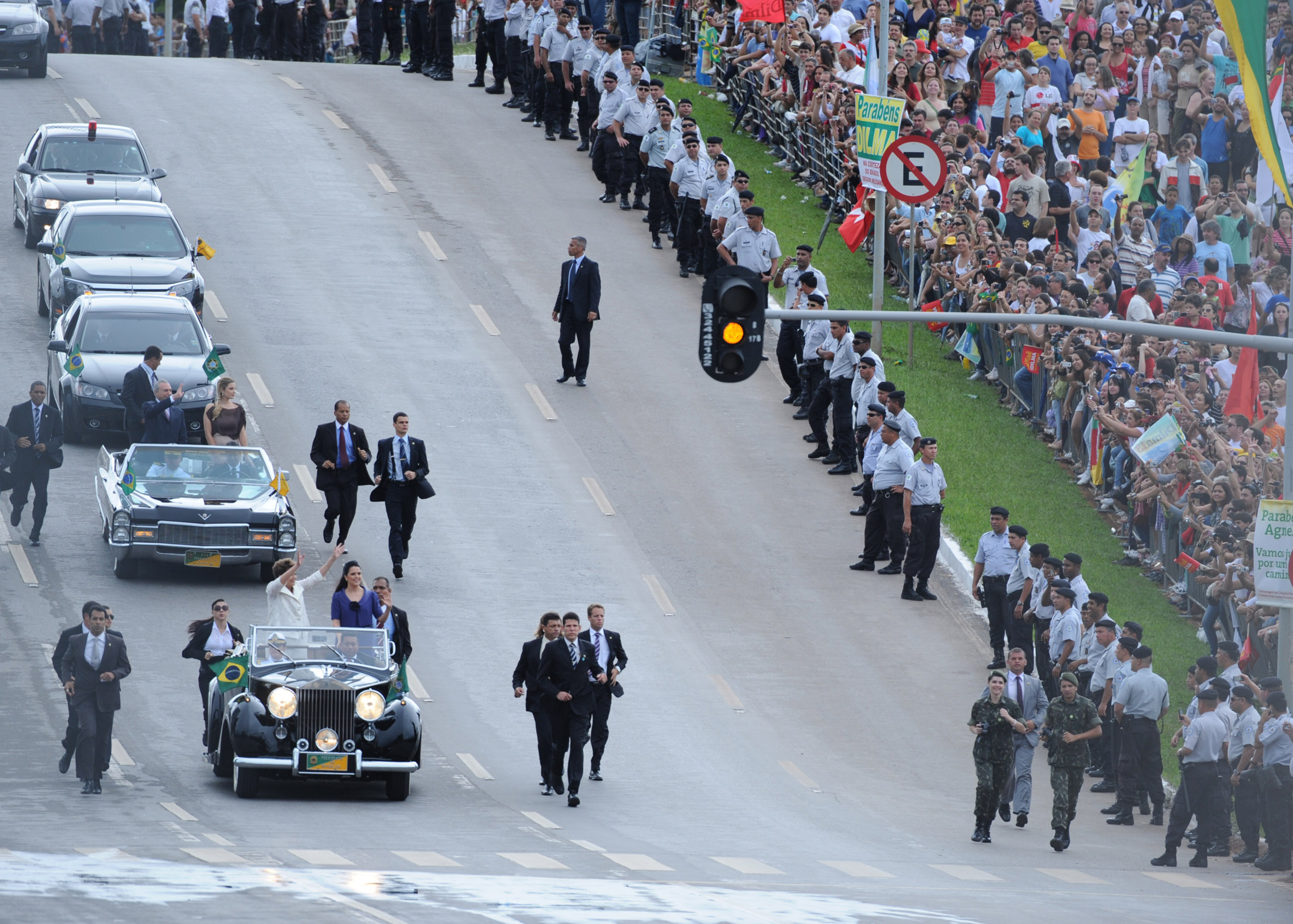
Brazilian presidential motorcade at the inauguration of Dilma Rousseff in Brasília, 2011

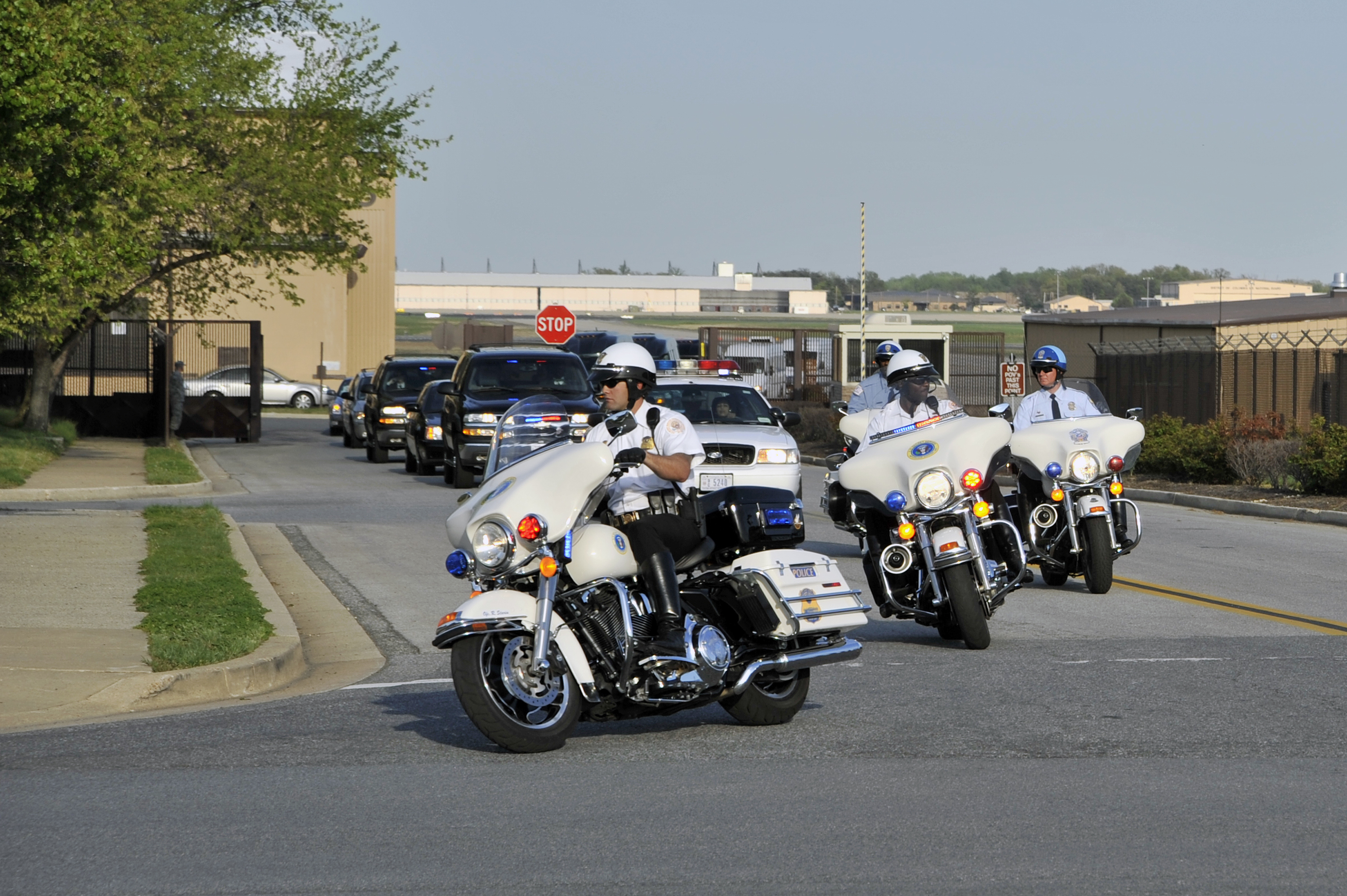
South Korean President Lee Myung-bak's motorcade leaving Andrews Air Force Base in Washington, D.C., 2010

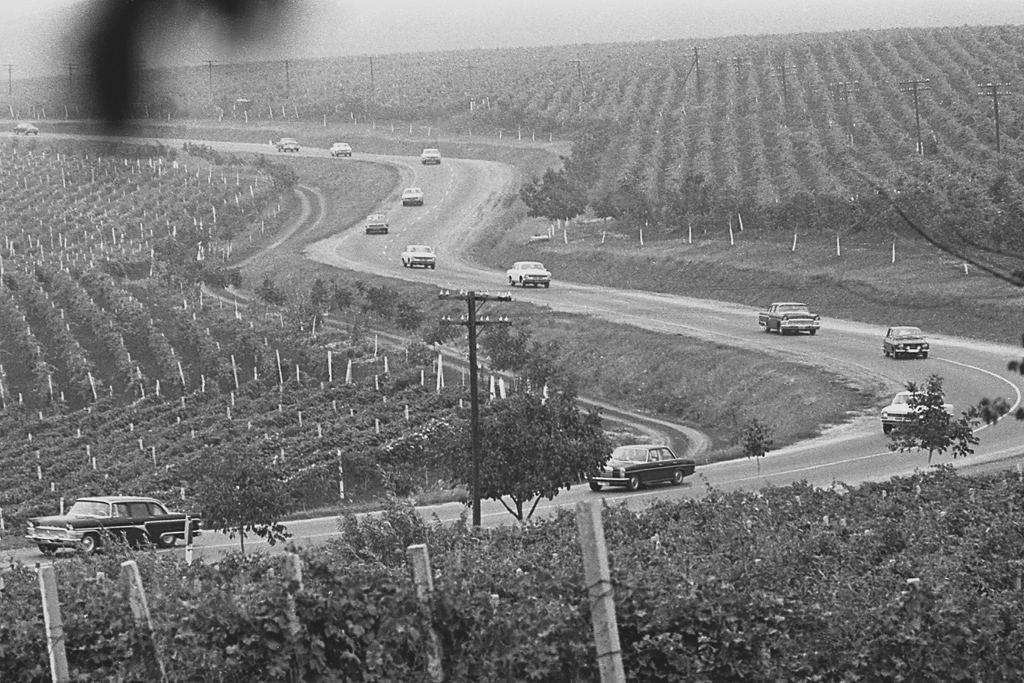
Nicolae Ceaușescu's motorcade in Soviet Moldova, 1976

== See also ==
- Official state car
- Air transports of heads of state and government
- Convoy
- Platoon (automobile)
