= Civil Contingencies Committee =

British cabinet committee

The Civil Contingencies Committee is a British cabinet committee chaired by the Home Secretary. It is intended to deal with major crises such as terrorism or natural disasters. It was supported by the, now closed, Civil Contingencies Secretariat, which was part of the Cabinet Office.

== See also ==
- ACCOLC
- Civil defence
- COBR
- GTPS
- Intelligence and Security Committee
