= Civil Defence Department =

U.K. governmental agency

The Civil Defence Department was a governmental agency within the Home Office of the United Kingdom responsible for civil defence. The department led to the establishment during 1957 of the United Kingdom Warning and Monitoring Organisation. On the run-down of civil defence in 1971 the department was replaced by the Home Defence and Emergency Services Division of the Home Office.

The senior official of the department was the Director-General of Civil Defence, also known as the Inspector-General. It oversaw 12 Civil Emergency Regions.

== Administration ==
Senior Officials of the Civil Defence Department
| Office | Member | Tenure |
|---|---|---|
| Director-General of Civil Defence | General Sir Sidney Kirkman, GCB KBE MC | 1954–1960 |
| Director-General of Civil Defence Training | Wing Commander Sir John Hodsoll, CB | 1948–1954 |
| Inspector-General of Civil Defence | Wing Commander Sir John Hodsoll, CB | 1938–1948 |
| Inspector-General of Civil Defence | Lieutenant-General Sir William Stratton | 1960–1962 |
| Inspector-General of Civil Defence | Air Chief Marshal Sir Walter Merton, GBE KCB | 1964–1968 |
| Secretary | Sir William Brown, KCB KCMG CBE | c. 1944 |
| Deputy Under Secretary of State | F L T Graham-Harrison, CB | 1963–1974 |
| Under Secretary | Harold Emmerson | 1940–1942 |
| Under Secretary | Oswald C. Allen, CB CBE | |
