= George Pitcher (journalist) =

British journalist, author and Anglican priest

George Pitcher is a British journalist, author and an Anglican priest. He is a visiting fellow at the London School of Economics, specialising in the future of journalism. He was most recently Editor-in-Chief of International Business Times UK, Associate Editor at Newsweek Europe and head of its editorial panel, positions he quit after his 60th birthday in 2015. He co-founded Jericho Chambers, a radical development of communications consultancy modelled on a set of legal chambers, with Robert Phillips, a former CEO at Edelman, in June 2013. Previously, he was appointed Secretary for Public Affairs to the Archbishop of Canterbury in October 2010 and left the post a year later. He was Religion Editor of Telegraph Media from May 2008 and wrote a regular column and occasional leaders for the Daily Telegraph and a contentious blog for telegraph.co.uk. He left the paper in June 2010, six weeks after editor-in-chief Will Lewis abruptly departed after a strategic disagreement. He serves on the Advisory Board of communications consultancy Cast From Clay

== Industrial editor ==
He was Industrial Editor of The Observer between 1988 and 1991, during which his commentary on the high summer of Thatcherite utility privatisation led to the Industrial Society (the precursor to the Work Foundation) voting him National Newspaper Industrial Journalist of the Year in 1991.

== Luther Pendragon ==
In 1992, he co-founded the communications consultancy Luther Pendragon with Charles Stewart-Smith, the television journalist. The firm grew through the 1990s off the back of major and often controversial clients such as British Gas, Kimberly Clark, Holocaust Memorial Day and the Hinduja family.

Luther Pendragon lays claim to having developed the professional practice of issues management, but this is disputed in the PR industry. In 2005, the firm was subject to a management buy-out, said to be worth £11 million by the trade magazine PR Week.

== Church of England ministry ==
Pitcher had undertaken training for ordained ministry in the Church of England and was ordained curate of St Bride's Church, Fleet Street, London – known as "the journalists' church". He was Associate Priest at St Bride's from 2008 to 2012. He was licensed as Priest-in-Charge to the Parish of Waldron in East Sussex in 2013. He is a regular broadcaster on religious matters, is a panel contributor to BBC Radio 2's Pause for Thought and has organised topical debates in churches. Since 2006 he co-organised Christmas benefit concerts for churches and cathedrals with Ian Anderson of Seventies supergroup Jethro Tull.

He occasionally attacks the conservative evangelical wing of the Church in print. He has also expressed concern about the entry of Anglican priests into the Catholic Church after the Holy Office accepted the creation of personal ordinariates for disaffected High Church traditionalists. He has been an outspoken opponent of the legalisation of assisted suicide and euthanasia in the UK.

He has also criticised the National Secular Society on the grounds that its website used language about "campaigning", "fighting" and that "it reads entirely like it is fighting a war to expunge religion from people's lives, even to make it something of which to be ashamed and contemptuous."

== IICSA ==
Emails sent in 2010 between Andrew Nunn, former correspondence clerk at Lambeth Palace, and Pitcher while he was Lambeth communications director, were read out at IICSA, the Independent Inquiry into Child Sexual Abuse, in 2018. The emails suggested "throwing" the then Bishop of Chichester, the Rt Revd John Hind, "to the press as a sacrifice", in the hope that it would distance Archbishop Rowan Williams from the abuse scandal and prevent the media from suggesting that the CofE's abuse problem was as grave as that of the Roman Catholic Church. Pitcher insisted on social media that the Church should not see him as "the bad boy of its communications" and that in 2010 the prevailing culture inside Lambeth Palace was "to stonewall, to do and say nothing in response to abuse allegations."

== Personal ==
Educated at Blundell's School in Tiverton, Devon, he has honours degrees in Contextual Theology from Middlesex University (2005) and in Drama and Theatre Arts from Birmingham University (1977). Pitcher lives with his wife and several children in Sussex.

== Publications ==
Pitcher has contributed numerous articles in newspapers and magazines, usually on business topics and public ethics, including The Guardian and the New Statesman. His first novel, A Dark Nativity, was published by Unbound in 2017. His book, A Time To Live: The Case Against Assisted Suicide and Euthanasia was published in July 2010 by Lion Hudson. In 2002, Wiley published his work The Death of Spin, an indictment of the superficiality of business and politics. In 1989, he published The Public Faced: Your Message and the Media with Charles Stewart-Smith, illustrated with the Alex cartoon strip.
