= Fuel protests in the United Kingdom =

Protests about cost of fuel for road vehicles

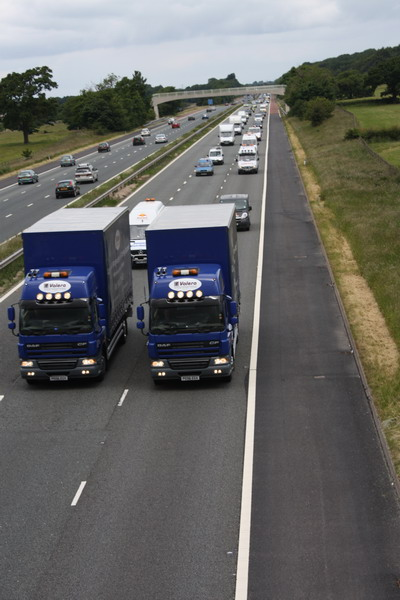
Lorries performing a rolling roadblock in a protest on the M6 in 2007.

The fuel protests in the United Kingdom were a series of campaigns held in response to the rising petrol and diesel fuel prices for road vehicle use. There have been three major campaigns amongst many other protests in the 21st century. The first major protest in 2000 was primarily led by independent lorry owner-operators. One group of lorry owner-operators from the South East of England formed a protest group called "TransAction" that protested at oil refineries and fuel depots in Essex. Protests and blockades of oil facilities caused widespread disruption to the supply of petroleum products. The aim of the protests was to secure a reduction in the fuel duty rate on petrol and diesel, which the government refused to enact. After the protest ended, the government did announce a freeze on fuel duties, and promised changes would be made to the way that goods vehicles were taxed, which would include the taxing of foreign vehicles operating on British roads.

Subsequent protests have not had as significant an impact but did result in panic buying in 2005, and again in 2007.

Further protests took place in the United Kingdom in 2022 as a result of record high fuel prices due to the Russian invasion of Ukraine.

== Background ==
In the United Kingdom, tax on fuel for road use is made up of two elements—fuel duty and value added tax (VAT). Fuel duty is applied at a fixed amount per litre by fuel type, and VAT is then added as a percentage of the combined total of the cost of the fuel and the fuel duty. Historically, fuel duty was increased annually, broadly in line with inflation. In 1993, the fuel price escalator was introduced by the Conservatives, justified as being designed to encourage less motor vehicle use, and thus combat climate change. The idea was to annually increase fuel duty, initially at 3%, later rising to 5%, above the rate of inflation. The Blair government then increased the rate at which the escalator exceeded inflation to 6%.

== 2000 ==
By 2000, tax accounted for 81.5% of the total cost of unleaded petrol, up from 72.8% in 1993. Fuel prices in the UK had risen from being amongst the cheapest in Europe to being the most expensive in the same time frame. The protesters said that higher transport costs in the UK were making it difficult for haulage industry to remain competitive. The worldwide price of oil had increased from $10 to $30 a barrel, the highest level in 10 years. Drivers in the UK were now paying an average of 80 pence a litre for unleaded and 80.8p for diesel. The government had already abandoned the fuel tax escalator in early 2000.

=== Timeline and effects ===
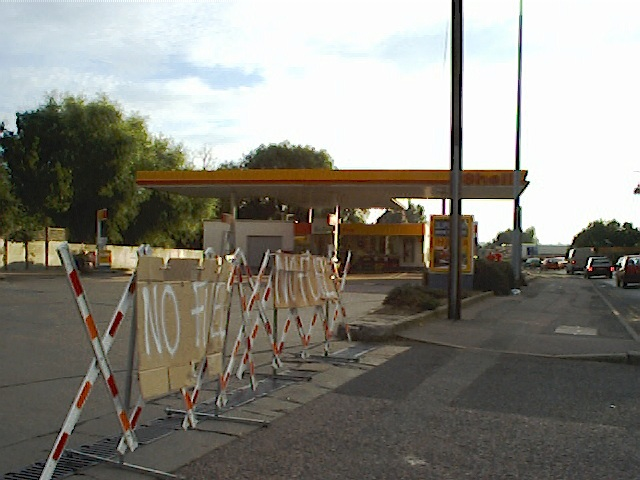
Ham Hill petrol station, which had run out of fuel.

In 1999, lorry drivers had undertaken protests in London against rising fuel prices and announced their intentions for a nationwide campaign. The Conservative Party organised a day of protest on 29 July 2000 to draw attention to how fuel prices had increased under Labour, visiting town centres with petitions and distributing leaflets. The Boycott the Pumps campaign, also referred to as Dump the Pumps, was organised for 1 August 2000, with motorists being urged not to visit petrol stations on that day. Support for the day was reported to be patchy, with forecourts in the North-West being hit the hardest, some reporting a 50% drop in business.

On 8 September 2000, the Stanlow Refinery near Ellesmere Port in Cheshire was blockaded by Farmers for Action, led by David Handley. Over the next few days, pickets were reported at Milford Haven and an oil terminal at Avonmouth causing some petrol stations to run out of supplies. On 8 September 2000, fuel protesters blockaded several facilities for a limited period and disrupted fuel supplies to Yorkshire, North West England, and the Scottish Borders demanding that the government reduce fuel taxes. Some of the protesters called for a reduction of between 15 and 26 pence per litre in duties.

The protests spread so that on 10 September 2000 they included facilities at the Manchester Fuels Terminal, Kingsbury Oil Terminal, the largest inland oil terminal, and at Cardiff Docks. Panic buying of petrol began to close some petrol stations as motorists queued for fuel which was beginning to be rationed and reports of garages increasing their prices substantially. Rolling roadblocks were also reported in North East England on the A1 and A55 roads. On 11 September 2000, the government obtained an Order in Council which was authorised by the Privy Council and the Queen to take emergency powers under the Energy Act 1976 to ensure delivery of fuel to essential services. By now six of the nine refineries and four oil distribution depots were subject to protests.

The campaign is against the government, it's a government taxation issue - it [the government] is not addressing what the protesters want.

— Texaco,

By Tuesday 12 September 2000, 3,000 petrol stations were reported to be closed due to a lack of fuel. There were also reports that there would be no fuel left within 48 hours. Tony Blair, the Prime Minister, put the oil companies under pressure to resume deliveries. BP said that they would resume deliveries if police escorts were given to the tankers. Tony Blair had been in contact with the oil companies during the day and announced that supplies would be on the way back to normal within 24 hours, with the oil companies having been ordered under the government's powers to commence deliveries to the emergency services. At the same time BBC News reported that the government's COBRA committee had drawn up plans to deal with the crisis, including using the armed forces to assist in moving supplies and restricting the sale of fuel. South West Trains were reported to be reducing some of their services to preserve fuel supplies. Deliberately slow-moving convoys of lorries caused traffic jams on the M1 and M5 motorways.

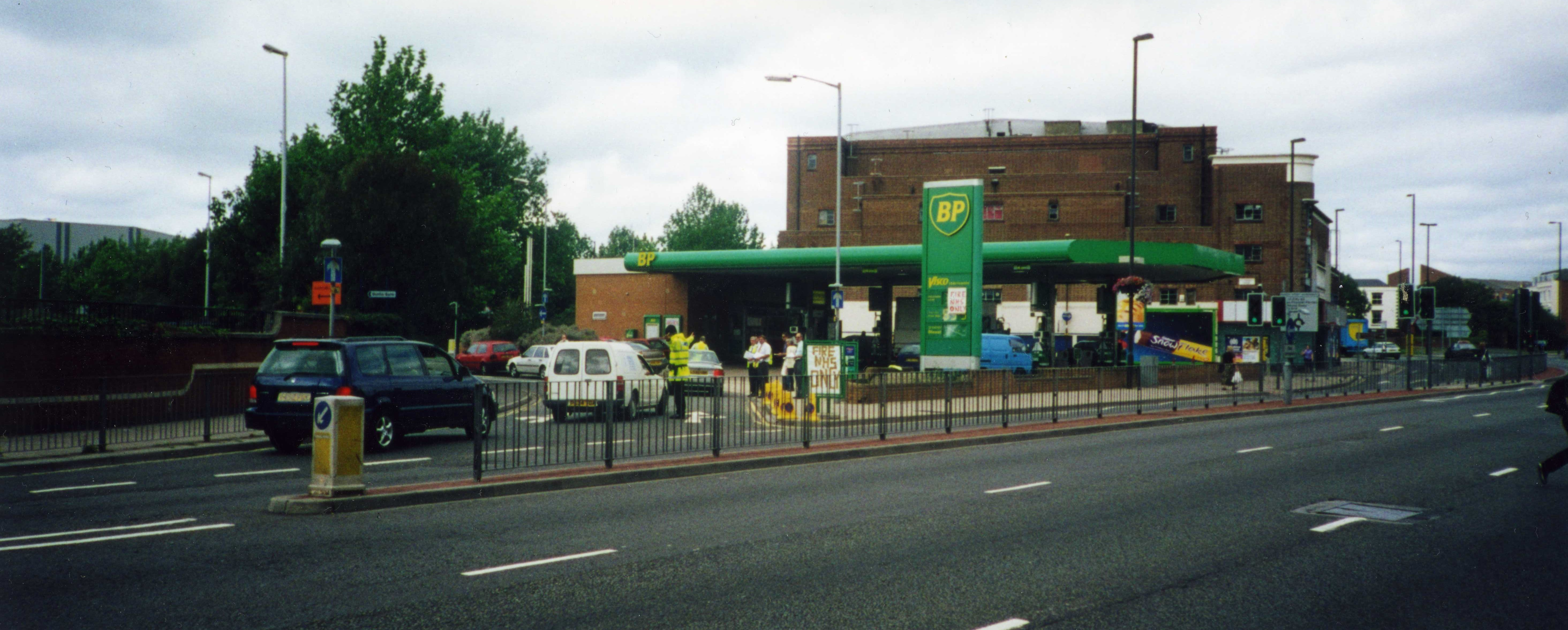
A petrol station in Portsmouth only selling fuel to ambulances and fire engines, with a hand-written sign saying "Fire, NHS Only" covering the fuel prices.

On 13 September 2000 the government announced that 5% of normal fuel deliveries were made, however other reports indicated that only 3.8% amounting to 5,000,000 litres (1,100,000 imp gal; 1,300,000 US gal) compared with a normal daily sale of 131,000,000 litres (29,000,000 imp gal; 35,000,000 US gal). In Scotland only very limited supplies were being delivered for emergency use only. Three-quarters of petrol stations were reported to be without fuel. Some NHS trusts cancelled non-essential operations due to staff difficulties in reaching work and ambulances were only able to answer emergency calls in most parts of the UK. The National Blood Service reported that it was coping and blood supplies to hospitals were not under threat but said that there "were some significant problems in some parts of the country". The government placed the National Health Service (NHS) on red alert. Supermarkets began rationing food due to difficulties in getting food deliveries through and there were reports of panic buying. Sainsbury's warned that they would run out of food within days having seen a 50% increase in their sales over the previous two days; Tesco and Safeway stated that they were rationing some items. Royal Mail also reported they didn't have enough fuel supplies to maintain deliveries and that schools began to close. The government began deploying armed forces tankers around the country and designated 2,000 petrol stations to receive supplies for essential services. Some deliveries commenced from the refineries and the police supplied escorts as required to ensure that tankers could move.

On 14 September 2000, the protests began to end. Several blockades of refineries were still in operation and the first deliveries were sent to designated distribution points under the emergency powers obtained by the government. Bus companies had warned that diesel stocks were running out and that services would need to be restricted to extend supplies. The protesters said that they were giving the government sixty days to act on the issue or they would protest further. A planned protest by lorry drivers in London was contained by the Metropolitan Police and did not cause disruption. A later report following an analysis of the automated counting equipment on the road network the Department for Environment, Transport and the Regions showed that at the protest's peak, 14 September, car flows on UK motorways was 39% below normal levels and on major roads 25% below. However, for road haulage the numbers showed a smaller decline of 13% on both motorways and major roads.

By 16 September 2000, supplies were beginning to be restored, at first only to the government designated petrol stations, the number of which had risen to 3,300. The London Chamber of Commerce reported that the protests cost businesses £250 million a day. After the protests had ended the Institute of Directors estimated the cost to UK businesses at £1billion. Meanwhile, similar protests began in France, Spain, Ireland, the Netherlands, Poland and Greece.

The conditions which catalysed and sustained the fuel protests of 2000 can be understood in terms of social movement theory, for example the existence of pre-existing social networks, capacity and resources.

=== Reaction ===
During the protests the oil companies were accused of collusion with the protesters by members of the government and its advisors. It was reported that the police had kept the roads clear yet tankers were being kept in the depots and not delivering petrol. The Transport and General Workers Union said that there had been incidents of intimidation against drivers of the fuel tankers. The possibility of court injunctions against the protesters was explored by TotalElfFina who received legal advice that it would be difficult to obtain and enforce one as there was not a named individual on which to serve the injunction. The company also stated that even if roads were clear, delivering fuel might change the mood of the protesters which had been "amicable" and that "Getting fuel to the pumps would only solve the short-term problem and not deal with the original concerns of protesters". The TGWU subsequently called for a public inquiry into reports of collusion between the demonstrators and the oil companies, saying that they had evidence of protestors being allowed access to the oil companies' sites without security checks and that drivers who had been willing to deliver fuel being told not to.

Were we to yield to that pressure it would run counter to every democratic principle this country believes in, and what is more, if the government was to decide its policy on taxes in response to such behaviour, the credibility of economic policy vital to any country would be severely damaged and I will simply not allow that to happen.

— Tony Blair,

The government stated that they would not back down in the face of protests or introduce an emergency budget. The government argued that the rise in prices was due to increases in the world oil market prices and not the government's fuel duty. Whilst agreeing that the government could not make policy in response to the blockades, William Hague, Leader of the Opposition criticised the government for having increased taxes, whilst the Liberal Democrats argued that the government should have responded to the protest much earlier. The Amalgamated Engineering and Electrical Union called for a reduction in fuel duties during the action.

A BBC opinion poll conducted by ICM of 514 people by telephone showed that the public support on 12 September 2000 for the protesters stood at 78% until the possibility of essential services being affected when it fell to 36%. An opinion poll for the Daily Mail of 502 people showed that over three-quarters thought the government had handled the crisis badly. Two opinion polls shortly after the protests had ended showed the Conservative Party had overtaken or reached equal standing with the governing Labour Party. By November support for the renewal of protests and the revival of the Conservative's fortunes had both been reduced, with Labour retaking a poll lead.

=== Consequences ===
In his pre-Budget report of 8 November 2000, the Chancellor, Gordon Brown, announced numerous changes which could ease the tax burden for motorists, and which included the taxing of foreign lorries using British roads. These changes included a cut in duty on ultra-low sulphur petrol, a freeze on fuel duty for other grades of fuel until at least April 2002 (effectively ending the fuel duty escalator), placing more vehicles into the lower vehicle excise duty (VED) band, an average cut of more than 50% on VED for lorries, and a Brit Disc vignette scheme requiring all lorries, including those from overseas, to pay tax to use British roads. The fuel duty freeze has been estimated to have cost the Treasury £2billion pounds annually in a 2004 report by the Economic and Social Research Council.

A renewed protest that same month, involving a convoy from North East England to London, did not produce the same level of support or disruption as before. It ended with a protest in Hyde Park and the closure of the Westway by vehicles left parked on it. A similar protest from John O'Groats to Edinburgh resulted in around 80 vehicles congregating in the centre of the Scottish capital. There had been some panic buying of petrol due to this protest and there were temporary closures of some petrol stations.

Brynle Williams who was one of the organisers of the protests later became a member of the Welsh Assembly for the Conservative party.

== 2005 ==
In August 2005, petrol increased in price to record highs of over 90 pence, with a small number of stations charging over £1 a litre. In September the average price had reached 94.6p a litre, with the rise being partially blamed on decreased world supply after Hurricane Katrina caused damage to some oil facilities in the United States of America.

The BBC reported on 7 September 2005 that the group responsible for the blockades in September 2000 was threatening to stage protests at oil refineries from 0600 BST on 14 September 2005 unless reductions in fuel duty were made. Newspapers reported that on 10 September 2005, the government had drawn up contingency plans to maintain the supply of fuel, including using 1000 army drivers to operate tankers, introducing fuel rationing and confiscating the driving licences of those who broke the law. Panic buying was reported on 13 September 2005 as drivers stocked up on fuel with drivers reported to be waiting an hour to fill their vehicles with petrol. At its height, around 3,000 petrol stations were emptied of fuel.

However, on 14 September 2005, only a small number of protesters arrived at the refineries with no intention to start blockading the entrances. The UK Petroleum Industry Association said the day's protest had proved "thankfully amazingly quiet", with the largest event attended by People's Fuel Lobby leader Andrew Spence, attracting just 10 protesters at its peak. At the Stanlow Refinery, which was blockaded in 2000 only two protesters attended the demonstration. Further protests on 16 September 2005 occurred on the M4 motorway where lorries drove as slow as 15 miles per hour (24 km/h).

In responding to the protests, the government argued that lower than needed supplies by OPEC and the Katrina hurricane had a more significant impact on the price of fuel than the level of duty.

== 2007 ==
Towards the end of 2007, fuel prices exceeded £1 per litre with a 2 pence rise in fuel tax in October, resulting in the highest diesel prices and the fourth highest for petrol in Europe. New protests were planned by two unconnected groups, one called "Transaction 2007" and the Road Haulage Association (RHA). The Scottish branch of the RHA proposed a rolling roadblock by around 30 vehicles, whereas Transaction 2007 intended to protest outside oil refineries. Whilst the rolling road block attracted 45 vehicles driving at around 40 miles per hour (64 km/h) on several motorways, the level of protest at oil refineries was lower than in 2000. One of the campaign aims of the RHA was the introduction of a fuel price regulator who would control duty during periods which was supported by Alex Salmond, First Minister of Scotland.

The protests of this period were not widely supported nor did they cause the same disruption as those in previous years. The 2007 protest which took place at the latter end of the year, culminated in 200–300 lorries descending on Central London with the police closing off the A40 fly-over for use as a lorry park for the day. Following this, a rally was held at Marble Arch. Later in the day, a deputation went to 10 Downing Street to deliver a formal petition calling for the reduction of UK fuel duty. There were those who felt that the 2007 fuel protests were politically motivated, given that many lorry owner operators and farmers would have supported the Conservative Party. The Conservative leader David Cameron gave them his support and promised a "fair fuel stabiliser", a proposal to limit the price of petrol that was part of the Conservative manifesto for the 2010 UK general election and was announced to be implemented following the budget of March 2011. The "fair fuel stabiliser" which was meant to lower taxes levied on fuel as the price rose and raise tax as the price fell, in fact tax will still rise as the oil price rises but the tax will be capped at the level of inflation at that time and will be applied twice a year, but when the oil price is falling then the tax can be greater than inflation. Quote from "Overview of Tax Legislation and Rates" section 3.44: "When oil prices are high, as now, fuel duty will increase by the retail prices index (RPI). However, if the oil price falls below a set trigger price on a sustained basis, the Government will increase fuel duty by RPI plus 1 penny per litre. The Government believes that a trigger price of $75 per barrel would be appropriate, and will set a final trigger price and mechanism after seeking the views of oil and gas companies and motoring groups".

== 2022 ==
As a result of the war in Ukraine pushing the global barrel price of oil to record highs, fuel prices soared. This resulted in the highest-ever fuel prices recorded in the UK. In early-July 2022, the average price for a litre of diesel reached 199.09p, while the average unleaded price was 191.55p per litre. Many petrol stations, particularly in rural areas and on motorways, were charging in excess of £2 per litre for both fuels. Protests were planned for 4 July via social media in numerous locations around the country. These demonstrations aimed to push the Government towards cutting fuel duty paid on fuel to lower the pump prices.

Support for these protests was mixed, with many happy to see action finally being taken against rising fuel costs. Others deem that this action will be largely ignored and instead cause motorists to buy more fuel due to the traffic that has been caused.

Gwent Police had arrested 12 people in connection to protests along the M4. They said there had been a legal notice in place banning demonstrators from driving below 30mph. "The moving protest started at around 7.00am this morning, at 8.30am four people were arrested with another eight people arrested at around 10.45am," their statement said. Furthermore, "All twelve people were arrested for breaching the legal notice by driving at under 30 mph for a prolonged amount of time." was said. Devon and Cornwall Police also released a statement saying that protests on the M5 were taken in a "safe and legal manner". "Officers escorted three vehicles off the road near Buckfastleigh. These drivers were given formal warnings and were advised over acceptable parameters of their protests, including a minimum speed and leaving lanes clear," said Superintendent Adrian Leisk. West Yorkshire Police had police deployed at Ferrybridge services, who deployed a stinger to stop motorists from leaving the services to take part in a protest on the M62 eastbound. They have defended the use of a stinger in this way and said that it acknowledged "the importance of lawful protests but will deal swiftly with any criminal offences". "It is clear deliberate disruption of the network will inconvenience huge numbers of people, draw police resources away from other important work and potentially delay the response times of all emergency services," the force tweeted.

== See also ==
- Energy crisis
- Don't Pay UK
- Yellow vests protests in France
