= Emergency Planning Division =

British Cabinet Office agency

The Emergency Planning Division had responsibility for emergency planning management in England and Wales.

From 1935 to 1971 civil defence in the United Kingdom was the responsibility of the Civil Defence Department. On the run-down of civil defence in 1971 the department was replaced by the Home Defence and Emergency Services Division of the Home Office. The head was an Assistant Secretary. It was renamed the Emergency Planning Division in the late 1980s.

Between 1957 and 1992 the Emergency Planning Division devolved civil nuclear defence to the department known as the United Kingdom Warning and Monitoring Organisation.

In 2001 responsibility was transferred from the Home Office to the Civil Contingencies Secretariat of the Cabinet Office.

== Civil Emergencies Adviser ==
- Rear Admiral David Kenneth Bawtree, CB 1993-
- Air Vice Marshal David Conway Grant Brook, CB CBE 1989-1993
