= NFU Mutual =

British mutual insurance company

The National Farmers Union Mutual Insurance Society Limited
- Logo currently in use by NFUM

- Headquarters in the village of Tiddington
- Type: Mutual
- Industry: Financial services
- Founded: 1910
- Founder: Seven farmers in the West Midlands
- Headquarters: Tiddington, Stratford-upon-Avon, Warwickshire, England
- Number of locations: c.280
- Area served: UK and Channel Islands
- Key people: Nick Turner (group chief executive officer); Jim McLaren (chairman) /Jim Creechan (Group Head of Legal and company secretary); Richard Morley (regulatory compliance and financial director)
- Products: Life; General; Pensions and investments
- Net income: ▲£314m profit (2025)
- Total assets: £22.8billion (2025)
- Number of employees: 3,884 (2018)
- Website: www.nfumutual.co.uk

NFU Mutual is a UK insurance company. It is a mutual business, meaning that the policyholder members own the business, and the executives and directors are accountable to them directly and not to shareholders. The full name of the organisation is National Farmers' Union Mutual Insurance Society Limited.

The business is authorised by the Prudential Regulation Authority, and regulated by the Financial Conduct Authority and with complaints oversight available by statute via the Financial Ombudsman Service.

== History ==
NFU Mutual was founded in 1910 in Stratford-upon-Avon, Warwickshire, by seven farmers as the Midlands Farmers' Mutual Insurance Society Ltd. Established in the wake of the National Farmers Union's formation in 1908, the business initially served exclusively farmers' union members.

Earliest operations were modest, with initial accounts showing premiums of £311 and a profit of £16. John William Lowe from Ettington served as the first chair until his death in August 1918. James Robertson Black became the first managing director in 1912, operating from his farmhouse in Clifford Chambers, which served as the Society's inaugural office. Among the founding members, John Metters made the first insurance claim, Madeley Burman led negotiations for official recognition with the NFU, and Arthur Pearce served as a director for 42 years.

The First World War proved to be a period of significant growth for the nascent society. Government incentives to increase food production brought about a rapid expansion of cultivated land and new prosperity for farmers. This consequently led to a rise in NFU Mutual's premium income, from £1,300 in 1914 to £3,200 by the end of 1918. In 1919, the society became the official insurer of the National Farmers' Union (NFU), formally adopting the name NFU Mutual. Its governance was structured with 16 directors, eight from each organisation, and membership remained limited to NFU members, who benefited from a 20% savings on insurance premiums. Ralph Chisholm, who would later become the first CEO, joined during this pivotal period.

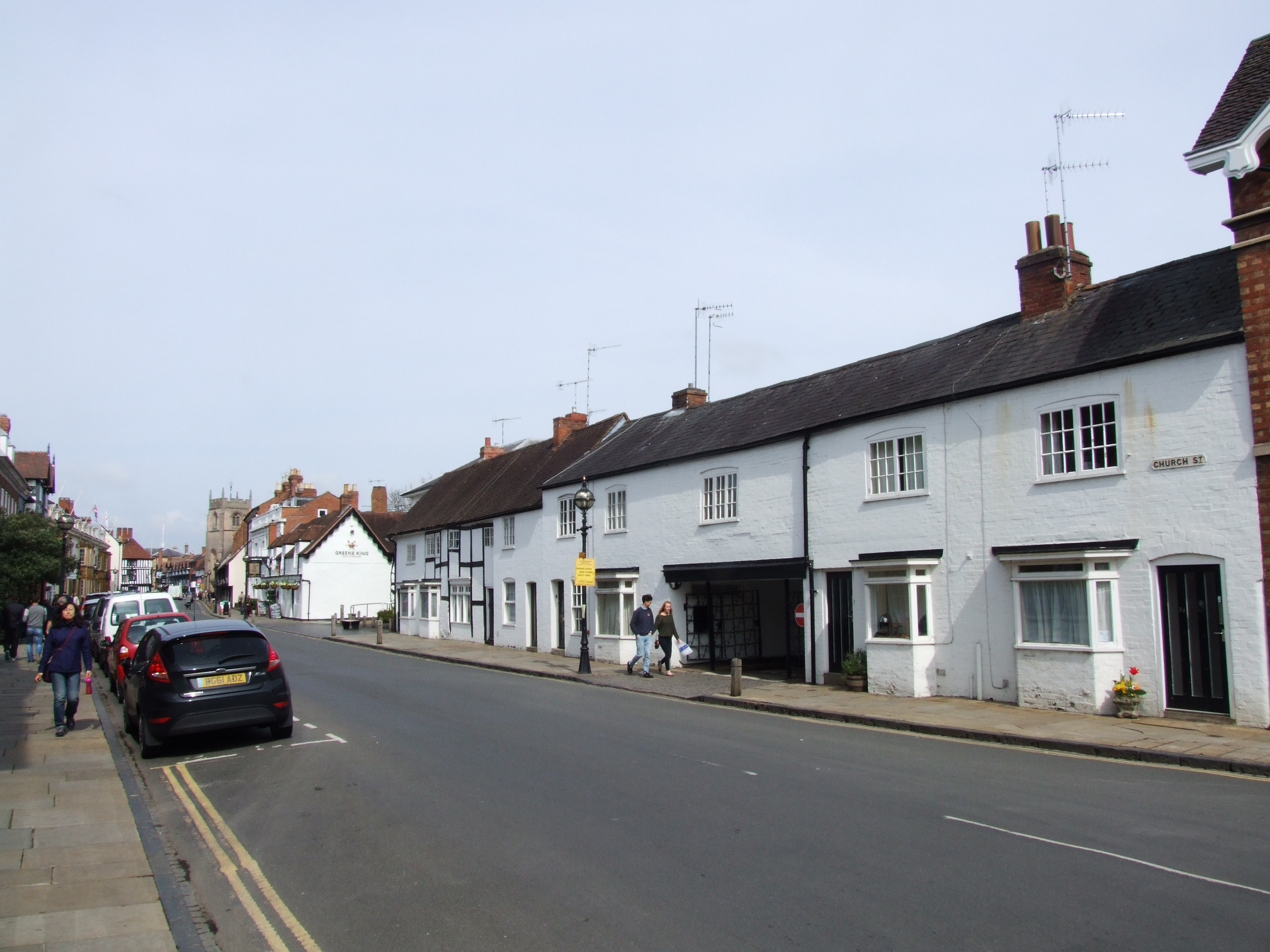
Church Street Stratford-upon-Avon: site of early Head Office

In 1920, NFU Mutual established offices in Church Street, Stratford-upon-Avon, necessitating a £3,000 loan to acquire the property, which put a debt on the balance sheet. This location served as the Society's headquarters for over 60 years until its relocation to the current home on Tiddington Road in 1984.

The company continued its expansion in the 1920s and 1930s. NFU Mutual became the official insurer of the NFU of Scotland in 1922. A subsidiary named Avon Insurance was established in 1925 to provide insurance products to non-farming customers. By 1928, it began to offer life assurance products and a pension scheme. In 1931, NFU Mutual celebrated its 21st Birthday, offering a 5 per cent discount to policyholders of seven years' standing and hosting events including a formal dinner at the Piccadilly Hotel in London and a ball at Stratford Town Hall. During the 1930s, NFU Mutual also developed a film unit for marketing promotion, producing silent films that used staff as actors.

By 1940/41, NFU Mutual had grown to over 100,000 policyholders, with an income of £1 million and assets of £2 million. Assets continued to increase, reaching £50 million in the 1960s, though a major foot and mouth outbreak in 1967 temporarily halted new related business.

The Village of Tiddington - home to the NFU Mutual Head office

New head offices, designed with environmental considerations, were built in Tiddington in 1984. By 1985, approximately 70% of NFU members were also customers of NFU Mutual. The late 1980s and early 1990s saw significant claims from exceptional storms, costing £30 million in 1987 and £58 million in 1990.

In July 1998, the Board put forward proposals to its members to change the Articles of Association, granting the Mutual the freedom to insure anyone, irrespective of profession or occupation.

To reassure core farming customers that this change would not adversely affect them, a product called Mutual Advantage was introduced, restricted to NFU Members, providing extra discounts and cover for farming customers. Mutual Advantage continues to be a part of the business's marketing to farming union members, although it is now called Union Advantage.

In the late 1990s, the potential demutualisation of NFU Mutual was explored by director John Murray, who initially approached five venture capitalists in the hope of launching a bid, with substantial windfalls for members anticipated. Commenting on the possibility of demutualisation to the House of Commons Treasury Select Committee, Andrew Young, then managing director, stated:

In our view, members of a mutual should... decide how the business is run, and if they are not satisfied, they should get rid of the Board and the management rather than demutualise.

Andrew Young retired in 2002, succeeded by Ian Geden, who became group chief executive in 2005 when that post was created. During his tenure, the general insurance premium income grew from £603 million to £944 million. In 2007, a series of floods brought more than 13,000 claims, representing a liability close to £100 million.

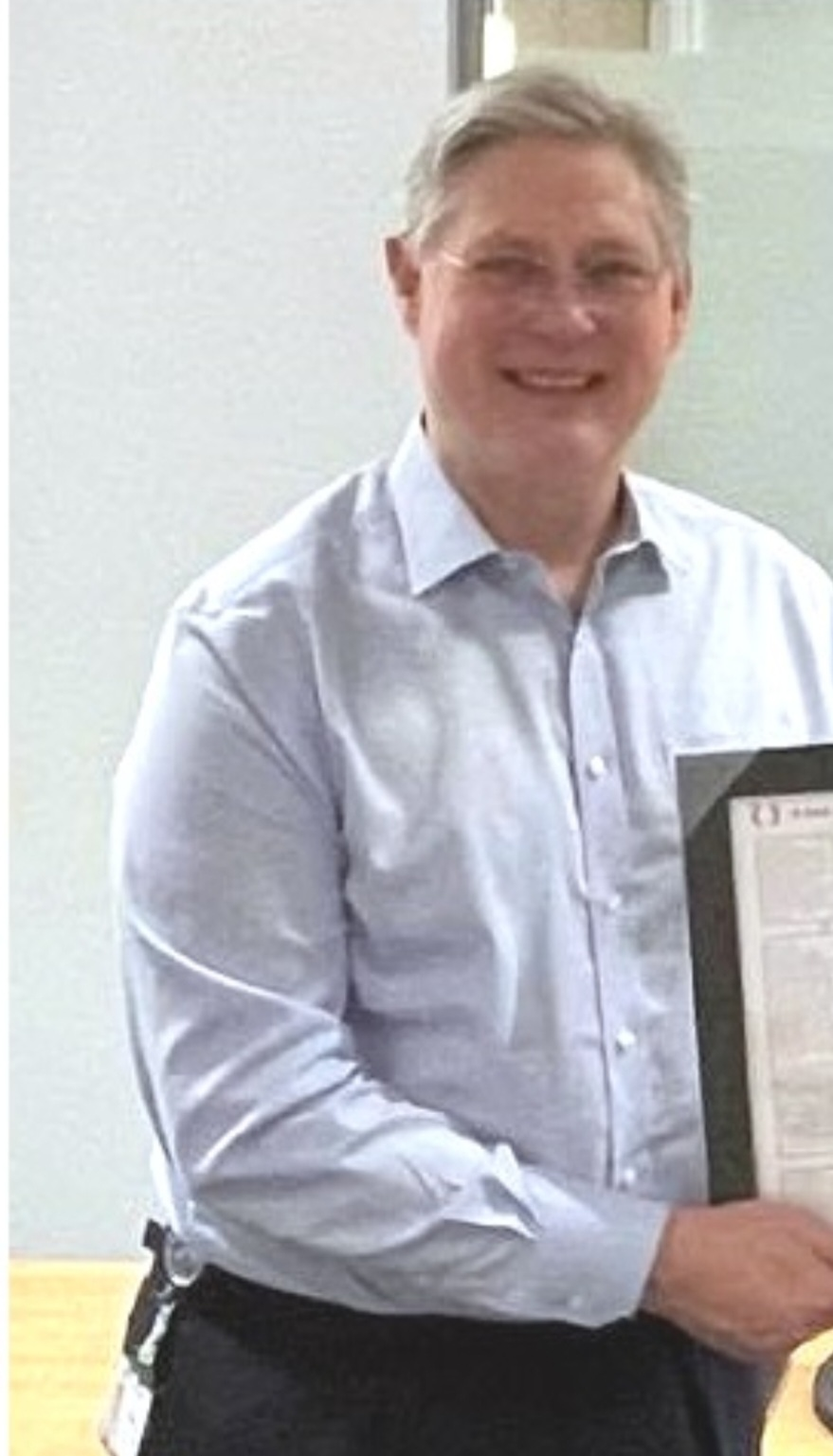
Lindsey Sinclair, CEO of NFU MUTUAL until 2021

Lindsay Sinclair became Chief Executive in 2008, notable as the first such appointment from outside NFU Mutual. He served as Group Executive for 12 years, retiring in March 2021, at which point the "Lindsay Sinclair Peace Garden" was created at the head office to mark his departure.

Animal rights activists from BiteBack claimed in 2013 to have hacked NFU Mutual's computer network, taking customer details and modifying accounts; however, NFU Mutual denied any breach, asserting their systems were secure.

== Recent Developments ==
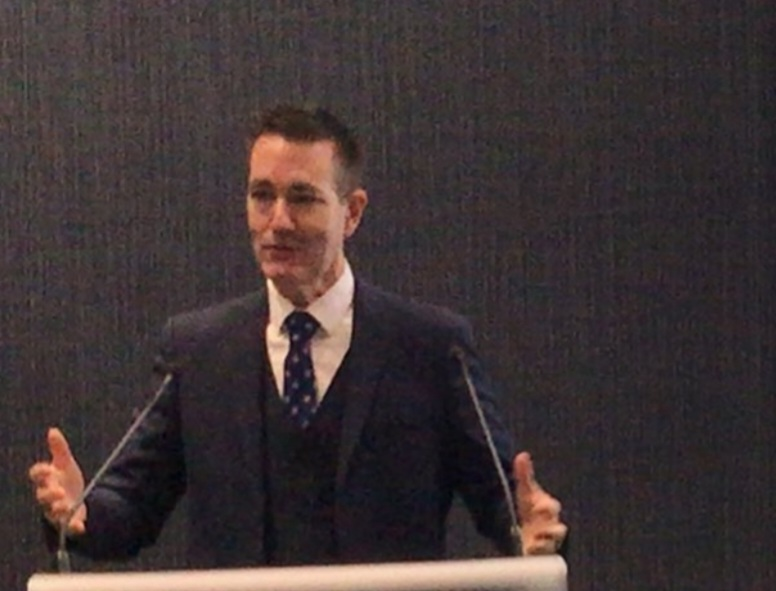
Nick Turner, CEO of NFU Mutual since 2021

In March 2021, Nick Turner became chief executive. He had joined the NFU Mutual board in 2013 as Sales & Agency Director, following 27 years at AXA in various sales, business development, marketing, and strategy roles. He also served as President of the Chartered Insurance Institute and the Personal Finance Society.

In 2022, NFU Mutual faced significant claims, including around £100 million due to a surge in farm fires and over 20,000 claims totalling £170 million from Storm Arwen (2021) and Storms Dudley, Eunice, and Franklin (2022). The company's 2022 Annual Report noted a "Principal Risk and Uncertainty" regarding significant changes in the customer base. Following the 2022 invasion of Ukraine, NFU Mutual announced it would divest its Russian holdings.

The period from July to December 2022 saw NFU Mutual report over 5,000 complaints, representing 3 complaints per 1,000 policies. In 2022, NFU Mutual successfully pursued committal (imprisonment) proceedings in the High Court against Mr. Khedir, who was sentenced to 10 months for contempt of court after admitting to lying at a hearing on fundamental dishonesty. That same year, NFU Mutual won several industry fraud awards.

In 2023, the business apologised to a third-party couple whose garden and swimming pool had been destroyed by a member's buffalo herd. In January 2024, Alison Capper, a member of the business's Remuneration Committee, gave evidence to the Environment Food and Rural Affairs Committee concerning issues of power abuse and exploitation of farmers in the agri-food supply chain. Also in 2024, a woman was successfully prosecuted by City of London Police for a £500,000 fraud against the business. Later that year, the business apologised to a retired police officer, a third party to its policyholder, for a two-year delay in progressing a subsidence claim for approximately £100,000 of damage.

Looking to early 2025, NFU Mutual announced plans to expand its presence in the high net worth market. In May 2025, gay, lesbian, transgender and queer members of staff marched in Birmingham Pride under NFU Mutual's 'Mutual Pride' banner.

In November 2025, NFU Mutual signed a multi-year partnership with Aviva for its individual protection products, including life insurance, whole of life, critical illness, income protection, relevant life and business life insurance.

== Financial performance ==
The business reported an Underwriting profit of £314m in 2025, while paying out £1.48bn in claims and £236m in Mutual Bonus to members. Funds under management for the Group grew from £20.9bn to £22.8bn in 2025 with £12.6bn of those funds in its Life business. Customers renewed 94.1% of their policies. The business's Gross Written Premium Income grew five per cent to £2,582million with New Business accounting for £136m.

The business reported Group profits of £360million in 2024 with total funds under management of £20.9bn. The General Written Premium Income before Mutual Bonus was £2,459m and the business made an Underwriting profit of £168m. The Financial Services side of the business reported £77.4m of new business and Life funds under management totalled £12.6bn.

The Group made a profit of £164million in 2023, when total funds under management were £20.2 billion. The group reported loss of £1.05bn for 2022.

The business experienced a period of underwriting losses for five consecutive years leading up to 2012. This was followed by a sustained period of underwriting profitability for six years, from 2015 to 2020. Subsequently, the business faced three years of underwriting losses between 2021 and 2023. In 2024, the business returned to underwriting profit, reporting £168 million.

=== Mutual Bonus ===
Without shareholders to provide profit for, NFU Mutual states it reduces renewing premium depending on how long a policyholder has been insured with the business. Mutual Bonus is calculated as a percentage of each individual policy renewal premium and provides a saving on a general insurance premium when the policy has been active for one full year and is renewed. If customer renew for a fifth year or more they receive the maximum saving.

In 2025, NFU Mutual provided £236m in Mutual Bonus savings to members. In 2024, the business provided £238m of Mutual Bonus. The current rates range from 5.5% in the first year of renewal up to 10.5% in the fifth year of renewal.

=== Mutual Investment Bonus ===
NFU Mutual shared a £74m Mutual Investment Bonus with eligible With-Profits customers in 2025, after sharing £71m in 2024. Mutual Investment Bonus is applied as an uplift to investments, representing a 1.85% increase in investments for 2025, and is in addition to the annual bonus provided to customers that receive one.

As a mutual with no shareholders, eligible customers who invest in the With-Profits fund benefit from the success of the fund and its financial strength, reflecting the current and expected economic conditions. More than £281m has been added to investments of eligible With-Profits customers through Mutual Investment Bonus over the past five years.

Mutual Investment Bonus will remain at the increased rate of 1.85% from 2025. This means that by the end of 2025, the fund will have benefited from an additional 7.6% return over a five-year period due to the Mutual Investment Bonus.

=== Solvency ===
The NFU Mutual has asked the Prudential Regulation Authority to reduce the scale of reserves required for it under Solvency II Regulations. This is still in place for NFU Mutual. In 2025, NFU's Mutual solvency ratio, which measures the business' ability to survive the most extreme plausible events, grew from 221% to 238%.

== Governance ==
=== Membership ===
The management and conduct of the business is done under the authority of the members/policyholders who are senior to the directors and executives and may dismiss them.

There are around 925,000 members of the NFU Mutual. Under NFU Mutual's articles of association, each policy generates a distinct right to speak and vote at the Annual General Meeting (AGM), scrutinise the accounts, and hold the management to account, as well as an ownership right in the business. The AGM has generally been held at the British Motor Museum at Gaydon, Warwickshire and is open to all policyholder members. In 2024 it was moved to a Leonardo's Hotels venue off the M69, and in 2025 the venue was transferred to the head office building in the village of Tiddington.

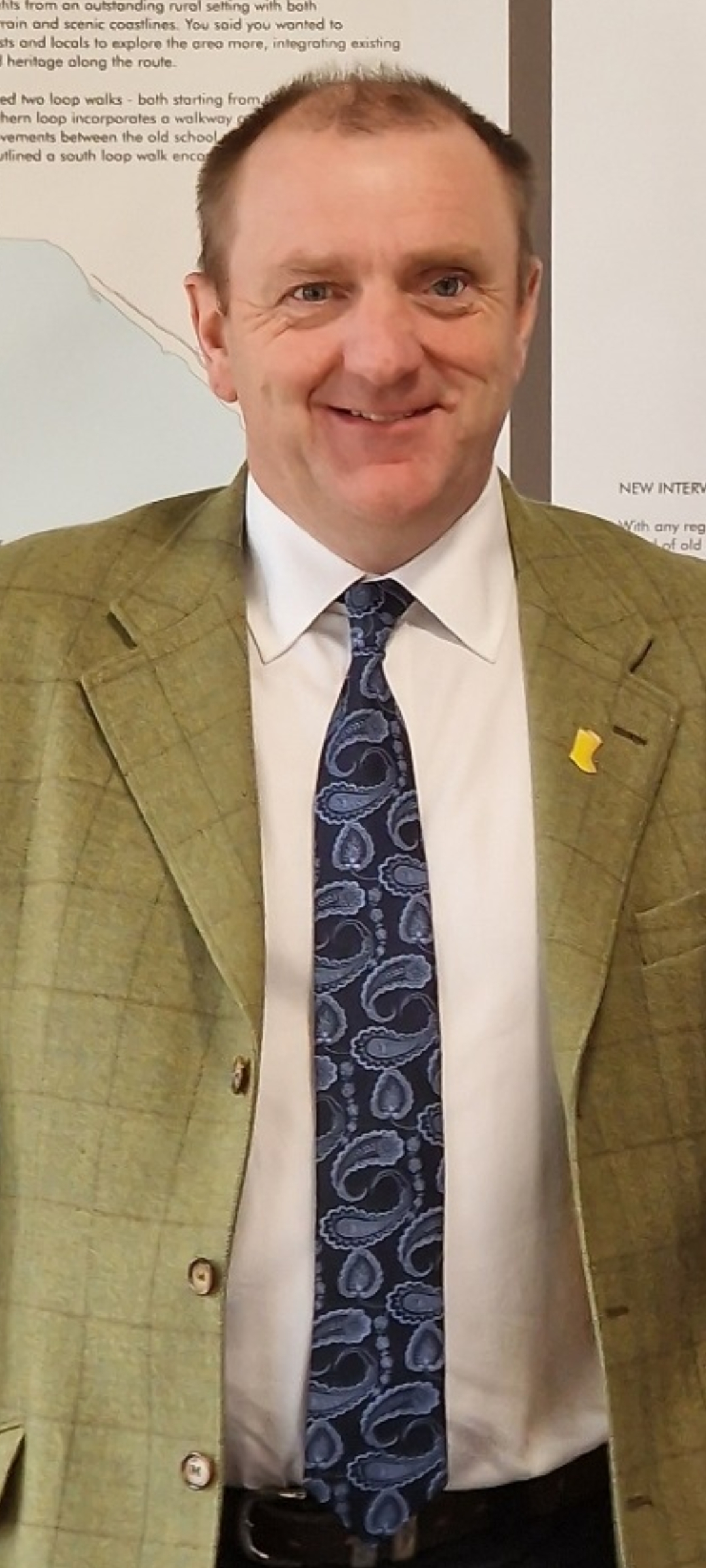
Jim McClaren, chair of NFU Mutual since 2019

=== Senior leadership team ===
Board members "are responsible for the overall direction of the Company and setting the Company's values and standards". As of autumn 2025, it consisted of the following people:

- Jim McLaren MBE (chair), a farmer from Scotland
- Nick Turner (CEO), formally held offices at AXA
- Richard Morley (Finance Director), held positions at Lloyds Banking Group where he was finance director of the bank's international financial services business at the time of the 2008 financial crisis
- Rachel Kelsall (Customer Services Director), a former head of compliance
- Nick Watson (Sales & Agency Director) joined NFU Mutual from AXA

Non-executive directors are:

- John Deane sometime CEO of Chesnara who has served as a board member of Atom Bank, Royal London Group, Old Mutual, and Century Life.
- Alison Capper DL, has held various governance roles. She is the chair of Horticulture Crop Protection (HCP) UK Limited, the industry-led successor to Agriculture and Horticulture Development Board (AHDB) for Horticulture, an appointment which followed the 2021 industry ballot to abolish the statutory horticulture levy; She holds various governance roles at Malvern St James.
- Jon Bailie Senior Independent Director formally held office at AXA
- David Roper also the Senior Independent Director of Atom Bank and is also Chair of the National Youth Choirs of Great Britain
- David Smith currently Chair of Altitude Plc
- Alan Fairhead held offices in Zurich Insurance Group
- Sarah Simpson announced as new Vice-Chair from 1st January 2027.

In September 2026, NFU Mutual announced that Jim McLaren was stepping down as Chair at the end of 2026 after 15 years on the Board and 7 years as Chair. He is also leaving his role as Chair and Trustee of the NFU Mutual Charitable Trust, a body which supports charities in the UK connected with agriculture, the countryside, and insurance.

Mr McLaren is being replaced by existing Board member John Deane from 1st January 2027, who has more than 30 years' of Board experience in mutual, listed and private companies. He has been a member of NFU Mutual's board since 2022.

NFU Mutual also announced Sarah Simpson would be installed as new Vice-Chair as well as Chair and Trustee of the Charitable Trust. She is a co-director of a dairy farm in Scotland, a fellow of the Royal Agricultural Societies and previously worked for NFU Scotland.

On 1 April 2023 Elizabeth Buchanan joined the board of NFU Mutual as a non-executive director, however, she resigned within months, with the company giving no reasons.

NFU Mutual's current Group Head of Legal and Company Secretary is Sian Johns, who took over from Jim Creechan during 2024.

Bev Mitchell is Marketing and Digital Director and Kenny Graves is HR Director. Gina Fusco, and Trisha Jones lately held these roles respectively.

Total emoluments to the highest paid director (Nick Turner) were stated as £1,965,789 in the 2024 accounts, and aggregate emolument the board was £5,125,771.

NFU Mutual was written to by the Equalities Minister in 2018 about its non-engagement with the Women in Finance Charter, which it later signed the same year.

NFU Mutual's executive remuneration policy includes specific "malus" and "clawback" provisions designed to safeguard the society's assets and ensure accountability. These mechanisms allow the Remuneration Committee to reduce or reclaim variable pay, including the annual bonus and Long-Term Incentive Plan (LTIP) awards, in the event of several defined triggers. Specifically, pay can be recovered if there is a material misstatement of the financial results upon which the awards were based, or if an executive is found guilty of serious misconduct. Additionally, the policy allows for clawbacks in cases of major management failures that result in significant financial or reputational damage, or if an individual fails to comply with key risk and regulatory controls. To support this long-term alignment, the Chief Executive and executive directors must also defer one-third of their annual bonus for three years.

=== Shift in Governance Structure ===
During Lindsay Sinclair's tenure as Chief Executive (2008–2021), a significant governance update occurred in 2010. On January 4 of that year, NFU Mutual Insurance Association Limited formally passed Written Resolutions to align its constitutional documents with the fully implemented Companies Act 2006 (which came into force on October 1, 2009). These resolutions centralized power by adopting new Articles of Association, streamlining the company's core governing document and integrating former Memorandum details. Additionally, they granted directors the power to allot shares in accordance with Section 550 of the Companies Act 2006, providing a simplified mechanism for issuing new shares and removing the need for repeated member approval. These changes were agreed upon by NFU Mutual Management Company Ltd, the sole corporate member.

=== Climate change ===
In 2022, NFU Mutual announced a carbon reduction strategy relating to its own operations. Targets include a 25% reduction in the business's own emissions by 2025 and a 50% reduction by 2030. To support this, NFU Mutual said it aims to maintain 100% renewable electricity purchase for its occupied premises. For its investments, the insurer is targeting a 50% emissions reduction in its equity and corporate bond portfolio by 2030.

In 2024, the business invested £50m into green or sustainable bonds, with £26m of this in gilts. At the 2024 year-end their aggregate holdings of green bonds were £350m of which £85m were gilts.

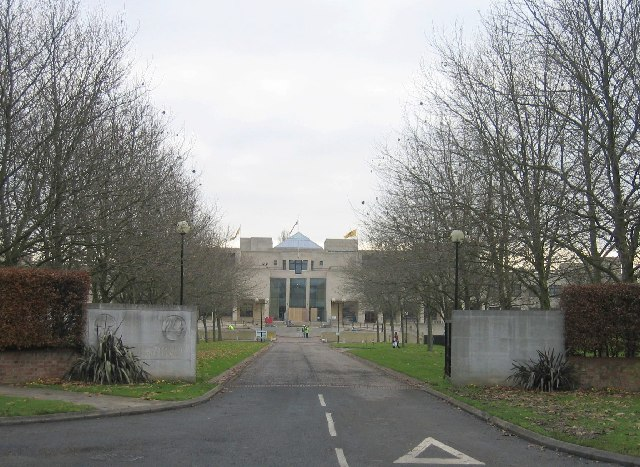
The architect-designed NFU Mutual head office building

In 2020, Ethical Consumer criticised NFU Mutual for "just talking about the climate impact of their offices" rather than the "far more significant impact of their investments". NFU Mutual responded saying: "We avoid areas we consider harmful such as predatory lenders, certain munitions, and climate-unfriendly companies with no plans to help decarbonisation."

In 2023 and 2024, the business published a Climate Change Report and in 2024, they published a Climate Transition Plan detailing how they would become a Net Zero company by 2050.

== Relationship with farming unions ==
NFU Mutual is linked with the main farming unions of the UK, and makes financial contributions to those unions each year. These contributions totalled around £8.7million in 2024.

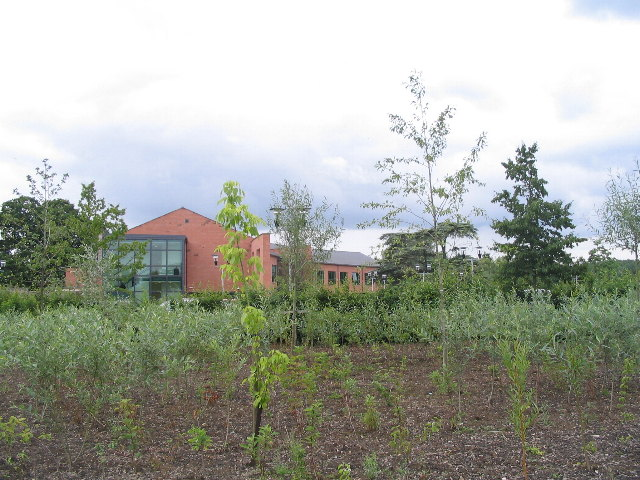
NFU building, Stoneleigh Park

After becoming the official insurer of the National Farmers Union of England and Wales (NFU) in 1919, the insurer forged similar links with NFU Scotland in 1922, the Ulster Farmers Union in 1930, the Manx National Farmers Union in 1947 and the Scottish Crofting Federation in 1986.

A large number of NFU Presidents have been directors of the Mutual, including:

- eight from the NFU,
- six from NFU Scotland, and
- four from Ulster Farmers Union.

Up until 1940 the venue for NFU Mutual's monthly Board meetings was the NFU's headquarters in London.

In the 1930s the Board consisted of 18 farmers, the number which was laid down in 1919 at the time of national recognition by the NFU. In 2025, the Board consisted of three farmers, with nine non-farming directors with a background in financial services.

In evidence given to Parliament, NFU Mutual has stated that it has between 65% and 75% of the UK farm insurance market, a figure it repeated in the press in 2025.

=== Union Advantage ===
NFU Mutual's Union Advantage offers enhanced cover and discounts to farming union members who commit to insuring their farm with NFU Mutual for the next three years or more.

=== Agency Network ===
The majority of NFU Mutual insurance policies are sold through tied insurance Agents (said to be self-employed), who are also Group Secretaries of the NFU, based in market towns and rural locations around the UK. At the end of 2018, NFU Mutual had 654 agents working out of 310 offices, dropping to around 280 agencies in 2025.

== Operations ==
=== Services and products ===
NFU Mutual offers personal insurance products such as home insurance and motor insurance. They offer commercial insurance for businesses and specialise in agriculture and farm insurance. They also offer life insurance products, and income protection through Aviva. The business also offers various investment and pension products, and sells financial advice and inheritance tax planning.

=== Member forums ===
NFU Mutual operates Regional Advisory Boards made up entirely of members. These meet with the Board and senior management, are briefed on the Group's performance, and provide feedback.

There are seven advisory boards, four in England, and one each in Scotland, Wales and Northern Ireland. They meet twice a year with Directors. NFU Mutual also has an online customer panel called Mutual Voice which they use to gather customer views on products and services.

=== Property dealing and development ===
In 2021, NFU Mutual bought a unit near Milnrow for £27 million, and also committed to spending £100 million on six sheds near Clowes. Also in 2021, NFU Mutual's plans to invest in a warehouse in Witney attracted over 190 objections. NFU Mutual responded saying the warehouses would create 150 jobs that will benefit the local economy and will add much-needed high-quality space to the area. In April 2022 NFU Mutual's management allocated in excess of a further £20 million of members' funds to this speculative investment with its commercial partner Tungsten.

In March 2022, plans were announced to build a speculative £34 million shed in Staffordshire. Work has since begun on the shed. In April 2022, a shed was traded with Valor for £50 million.

In July 2022, NFU Mutual sold eight warehouses to American-based investment firm Barings LLC for £234 million and the negotiations were described as "contentious" when the deal completed in 2023. The property was subsequently sold within two years; the new ownership reported achieving a significant profit following a 20% increase in the asset's income during their relatively brief holding period.

In October 2022, along with partners Apache, NFU Mutual obtained a loan of £70 million from Deutsche Bank to finance a £150 million build-to-rent development in Liverpool. A 325 rental-home unit neighbourhood in Liverpool was funded with NFUM capital and loans and opened in late 2022. It is reported to be the UK's largest build to rent project.

In May 2023, it was revealed that the business was to sell another £90 million worth of real estate assets.

NFU Mutual liquidated retail assets in London in 2023; 24 Old Bond Street was sold for £141 million; 3/5 Bond Street was sold for £151 million.

In 2024, the business spent £20 million on another office building.

In 2025, the business closed its headquarters in Belfast and placed it on the market for £5 million; at the time over 60% of the rental area was vacant. It also confirmed it was closing part of its office accommodation in its Stratford headquarters territory. It also disposed of over £100 million of logistics assets in an off-market deal.

In July 2025, a 476-home rental neighbourhood in Edinburgh was completed following investment from NFU Mutual and partners.

== Subsidiaries ==
The business lists the following active subsidiaries:

- N.F.U. Mutual Unit Managers Limited: (No. 1837277). Registered in England. Registered Office: Tiddington Road, Stratford upon Avon, Warwickshire CV37 7BJ. Authorised corporate director of The NFU Mutual OEIC.
- The NFU Mutual OEIC: (No. IC000220) An investment company with variable capital incorporated in England. Authorised by the Financial Conduct Authority. Financial Services Register number 407816.
- The NFU Mutual Portfolio Funds OEIC: (No. IC000745) An investment company with variable capital incorporated in England. Authorised by the Financial Conduct Authority. Financial Services Register number 496718.
- NFU Mutual Select Investments Limited: (No. 8049488) Authorised by the Financial Conduct Authority. Financial Services Register number 582519
- Risk Management Services: NFU Mutual Risk Management Services Ltd. is a health and safety company set up in 1997. NFU members receive a discount on some Risk Management Services through Union Advantage.

=== Islands Insurance ===
NFU Mutual acquired the Islands Insurance Group in 1987, providing access to NFU Mutual products for customers in the Channel Islands. Employing more than 70 staff in offices in Jersey, Guernsey and Alderney, it offers insurance, broking, and financial advice.

=== Avon Insurance ===
Avon Insurance was established in 1925 to provide insurance to non-farming customers. It began life as the Farmers Commercial Insurance Company before being renamed. The establishment of this enterprise was opposed by the NFU hierarchy and the NFU Mutual directors were required to agree that they would "consult on such matters in future". Business increased in the 1970s at 25–30% each year, and Avon opened an underwriting room near Lloyd's insurance market in 1977. In 1975, Avon became one of the first companies to introduce index-linking of sums insured to protect customers against inflation. Avon closed to new business in 2013, but it continues to operate and in 2025 generated a profit of £4.9million.

=== Other insurance operations ===
In 1929, NFU Mutual bought another farming insurance company, Northern Farmers. Between 1948 and 1974, NFU Mutual had operations alongside unions in Central and East Africa, including what was then known as Rhodesia and Kenya. Operations in Kenya ceased in 1964 and Rhodesia in 1974.

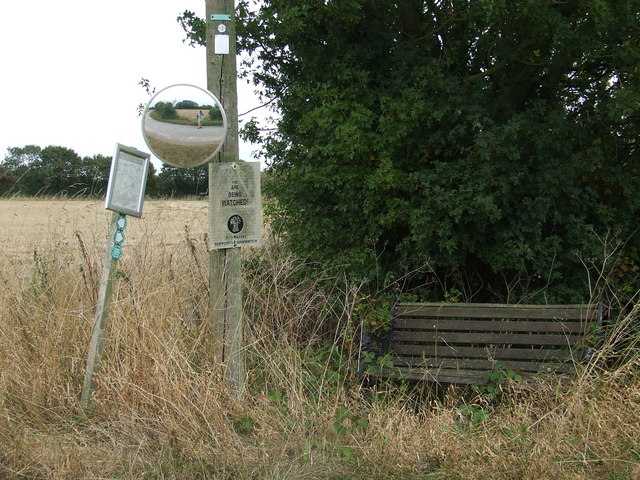
NFU Mutual signage for a campaign

== Charitable activities ==
=== NFU Mutual Charitable Trust ===
NFU Mutual set up a Charitable Trust in 1998 for the elevating of need concerned with 'agriculture, rural development and insurance.'

In the past 24 years the independent charity has distributed funds averaging around £250,000 per year. Since it was founded, the Trust has donated more than £9.7million towards causes included education, research, social welfare and poverty relief.

In 2025, the insurer pledged £1.2m to the Charitable Trust. Donations included a travel scholarship for six young Welsh farmers.

=== Farm Safety Foundation ===
In 2014, NFU Mutual set up the Farm Safety Foundation, an independent charity. It is concerned with education of young farmers, as well as eliminating avoidable deaths and addressing mental health issues.

In 2025, NFU Mutual donated £370,000 to the Foundation so it can continue to raise awareness of and address attitudes and behaviours of mental health.

=== Agency Giving Fund ===
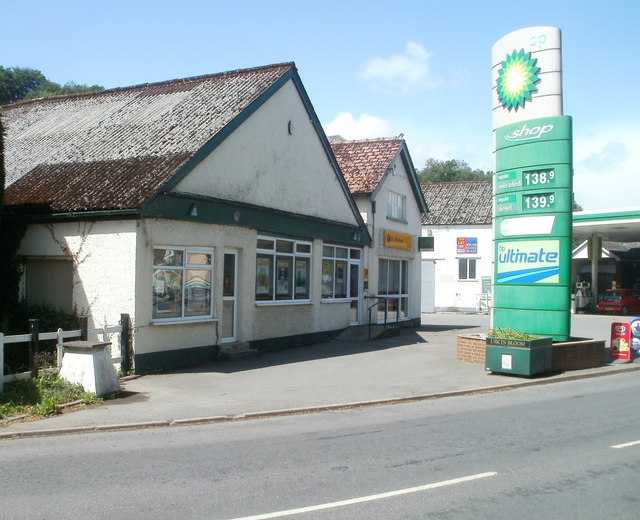
An NFU Mutual agency in Usk. One local office of over 295 nationally.

First launched in 2020 in response to the COVID-19 pandemic, NFU Mutual mandates an agency giving structure where local offices distribute a portion of a central fund to charities in their local communities.

The fund will be donating £2.33m to local front-line charities in 2025. This is an increase from the £1.92m it donated to charities in 2024. Recipients include charities providing emotional and social support, like community cafes, horse riding clubs for the disabled, and out-of-hours blood bikes.

NFU Mutual donated £7,899 to the Dumfries and Lockerbie Society as part of its 2025 Agency Giving Fund.

=== Covid-19 Support ===
In 2020, NFU Mutual announced a £32 million "support package" for customers, agencies, and communities affected by the Coronavirus pandemic. A detailed breakdown of this package indicated that its majority comprised revisions to policies and internal allocations, rather than the implied direct cash disbursements, specifically:

- £24 million (75% of the package's stated value) comprised revisions to existing policies, such as adjustments to coverages or inclusion of COVID-19 in personal accident policies, rather than direct cash pay-outs.
- £5 million (approximately 15.6%) was allocated internally to their own agency offices.
- The package also included £1.8 million (approximately 5.6%) in widely publicised direct charitable donations.

NFU Mutual also supported the COVID-19 Support Fund, a fund established by the insurance and long-term savings industry alongside the Government, but the scale of its contribution has not been disclosed.

== Research and reports ==
=== Rural Crime Report ===
The business issues an annual Rural Crime report based on estimates from its claims data. The 2025 report revealed that rural crime cost the UK an estimated £44.1million in 2024, down from £52.8m in 2023. Agricultural vehicle thefts fell by 35% to an estimated £7m, and GPS unit theft was down 71% to £1.2m following a spike in 2023. NFU Mutual hosted a joint-parliamentary reception with the NFU on the subject in 2025 which was attended by Policing Minister Dame Diana Johnson.

=== Farm Shop Theft ===
In 2025, NFU Mutual's research found that 67% of rural retailers suffered from crime in the past 12 months, prompting the rural insurer to issue a warning for owners to take preventative measures to try and deter thieves.

=== Tool Theft ===
According to research by commercial insurer NFU Mutual, one in 20 tradespeople have considered leaving the industry due to repeated thefts, while one in 15 know someone who has already quit because of the problem. Nearly three-quarters of those surveyed reporting they had been victims of theft in the past year.

=== Code for Countryside Roads ===
In 2024, the business issued a Rural Road Safety Report that found collisions on rural roads were four times more likely to result in a fatality. In response to those figures, NFU Mutual launched a Code for Countryside Roads to help motorists use rural roads safely and respectfully.

=== Responsible Business Report ===
Since 2016, NFU Mutual has produced an annual responsible business report which the company states tracks progress on 'how we care for our members, our communities, our people and the environment.'

=== Farm Fires ===
In November 2025, NFU Mutual published a report that revealed farm fires cost more than £100m in 2024, while fire damage to agricultural vehicles also cost an extra £37m. In 2026, NFU Mutual's latest report revealed the cost of farm fires rose to £118m in 2025 and agricultural vehicle fires cost an extra £32m.

== Awards ==
=== Which? Awards ===
NFU Mutual has been named Which? Insurance Brand of the Year in the UK for four years in a row (2022; 2023; 2024; 2025), with the consumer champion noting the insurer “stands out among other providers as it has comparatively high customer and claims scores, it scores well for good value for money and it offers high-performing products.”

NFU Mutual were also shortlisted for the Which? 2025 Customer Service Brand of the Year award.

=== Employer Awards ===
NFU Mutual was the 17th best place to work in the UK in 2024 according to Glassdoor. This was an increase from 43rd in 2023. The business won the Gallup Exceptional Workplace Award for a tenth successive year in 2025.

=== Agency Awards ===
NFU Mutual's Agency in the New Forest, Isle of Wight and Bournemouth has been given three awards in one year. The agency was recently named the winner of the Isle of Wight Countryside Business of the Year, a distinguished award that celebrates businesses that make a positive impact on the local countryside and rural economy on the Isle of Wight.

== Notable people ==
During World War II, Arthur Scarf, an employee was awarded a posthumous Victoria Cross.

An early director, Sir Basil Brooke, also played a prominent role in Northern Ireland public affairs, ultimately becoming Prime Minister of Northern Ireland. Brooke had a background in loyalist paramilitary activities, including commanding the Ulster Special Constabulary, and was known for publicly advocating for Protestant-only employment.

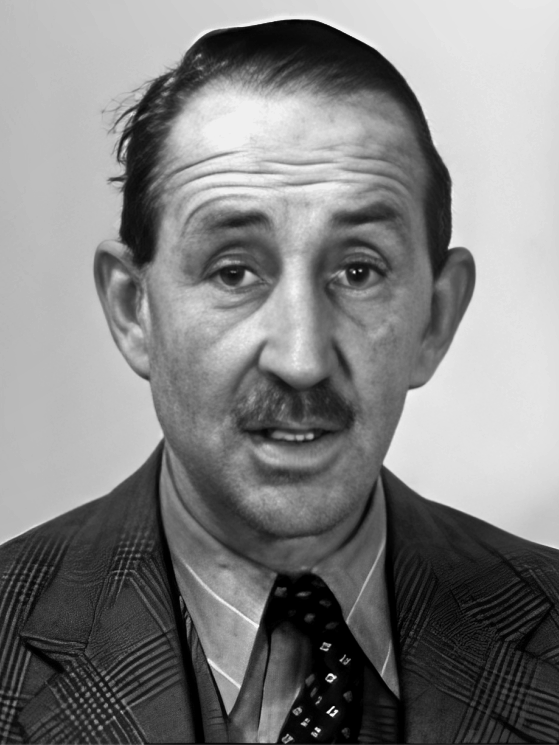
Sir Basil Brooke, prominent early director

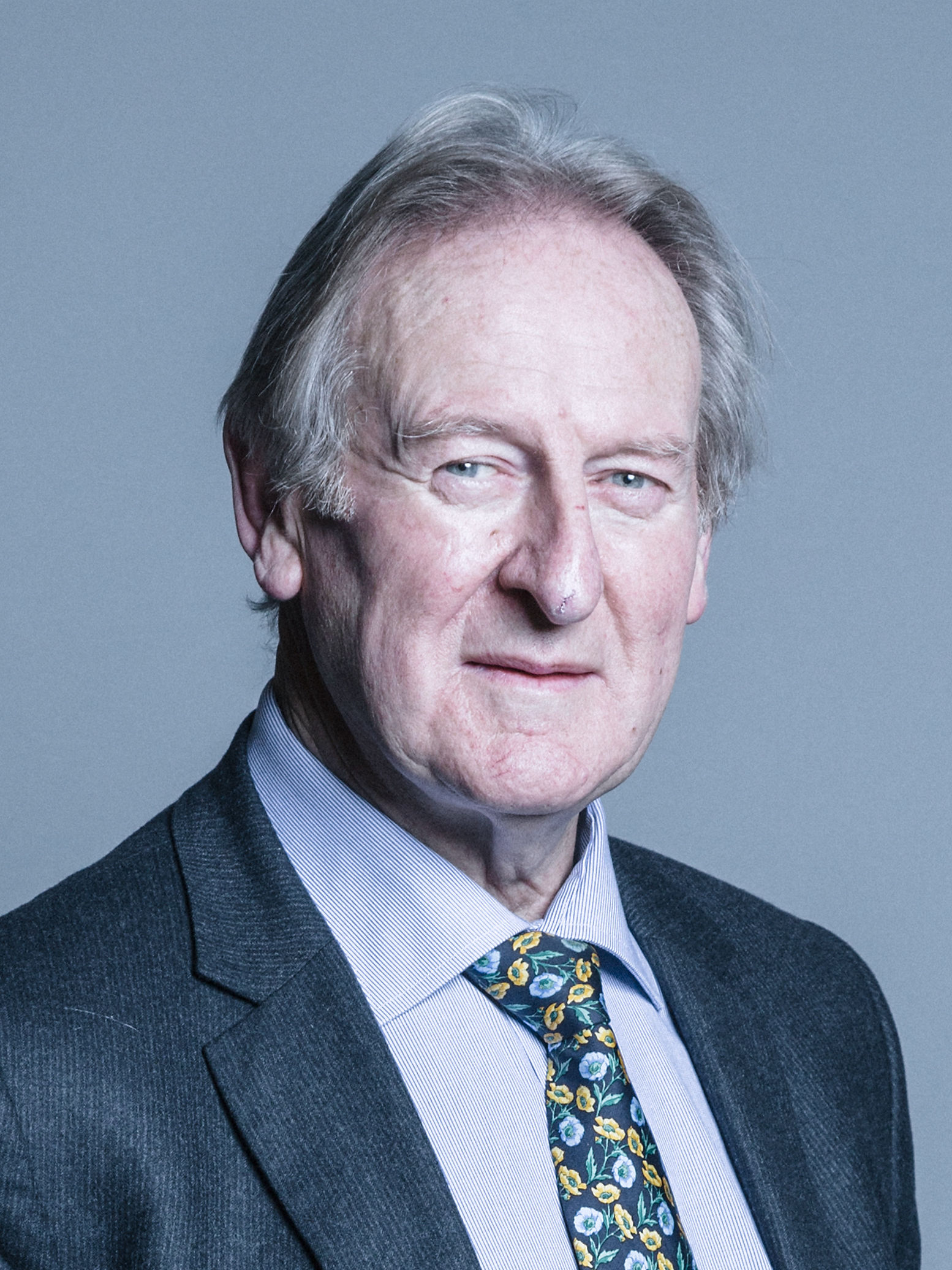
Lord Curry of Kirkharle, a former chairman

A former chairman of NFU Mutual is Lord Curry of Kirkharle. He was appointed a director of NFU Mutual in 1997, and was vice-chairman before being elected chairman in 2003.

Harold Woolley, Baron Woolley was a director retiring in the 1980s.

== Court cases ==
=== McGreevy ===
The company's transition to a self-employed agency model was the subject of an employment tribunal. The court dismissed all of the grounds of appeal brought by the appellant.

=== Smith (Leah) ===
In Smith (Leah) v National Farmers Union Mutual Insurance Society Limited and Robinsons Services Limited [2019] NIQB 37, the company denied liability for an accident sustained during an employee's attendance at work, but the court found against the company.

=== Barber & Co ===
In 2017, Preston-based law firm Barber & Co were ordered to pay costs to NFU Mutual after the firm represented a claimant in an injury case without instruction. Barber & Co lost the case and HHJ Peter Hughes referred the case onto the Solicitors Regulation Authority, Lancashire Police and the Crown Prosecution Service for further action. The law firm claimed the case was the result of "two non-qualified fee earners creating false documentation."

=== Govina ===
In 2016, NFU Mutual denied liability for a £128,000 bill for damage to a cottage from a burst water pipe. NFU Mutual lost the case and was ordered by Mr Justice Holgate to pay £100,000 in legal costs on top of the damage.

=== Maritsave Ltd ===
In Maritsave Ltd v National Farmers Union Mutual Insurance Society Ltd [2011] EWHC 1660 (QB) lost a case, having incorrectly denied an insurance claim following a fire: the court found they failed to prove a policy breach, and ordered them to pay Maritsave Ltd.'s claim and damages.

=== HSBC ===
In 2010, NFU Mutual sought compensation from HSBC towards fire damage to a property on the basis of double insurance but the judge agreed with HSBC and NFU Mutual was liable for the full extent of the claim.

== Controversies ==
=== Frauds ===
In 2011, employee Gordon Murray was jailed for three years for his fraud on the members of £400,000.

In 2018, Iain Wishlade also an NFU employee, was jailed for over two years for submitting a fraudulent payment request from his business LDK Ltd to NFU Mutual.

There have also been periodic frauds on the NFUM by its policy holder members. The most serious of these saw the perpetrator jailed for 20 years following the arrangement of an explosion which injured 81 people.

=== Business interruption and COVID-19 ===
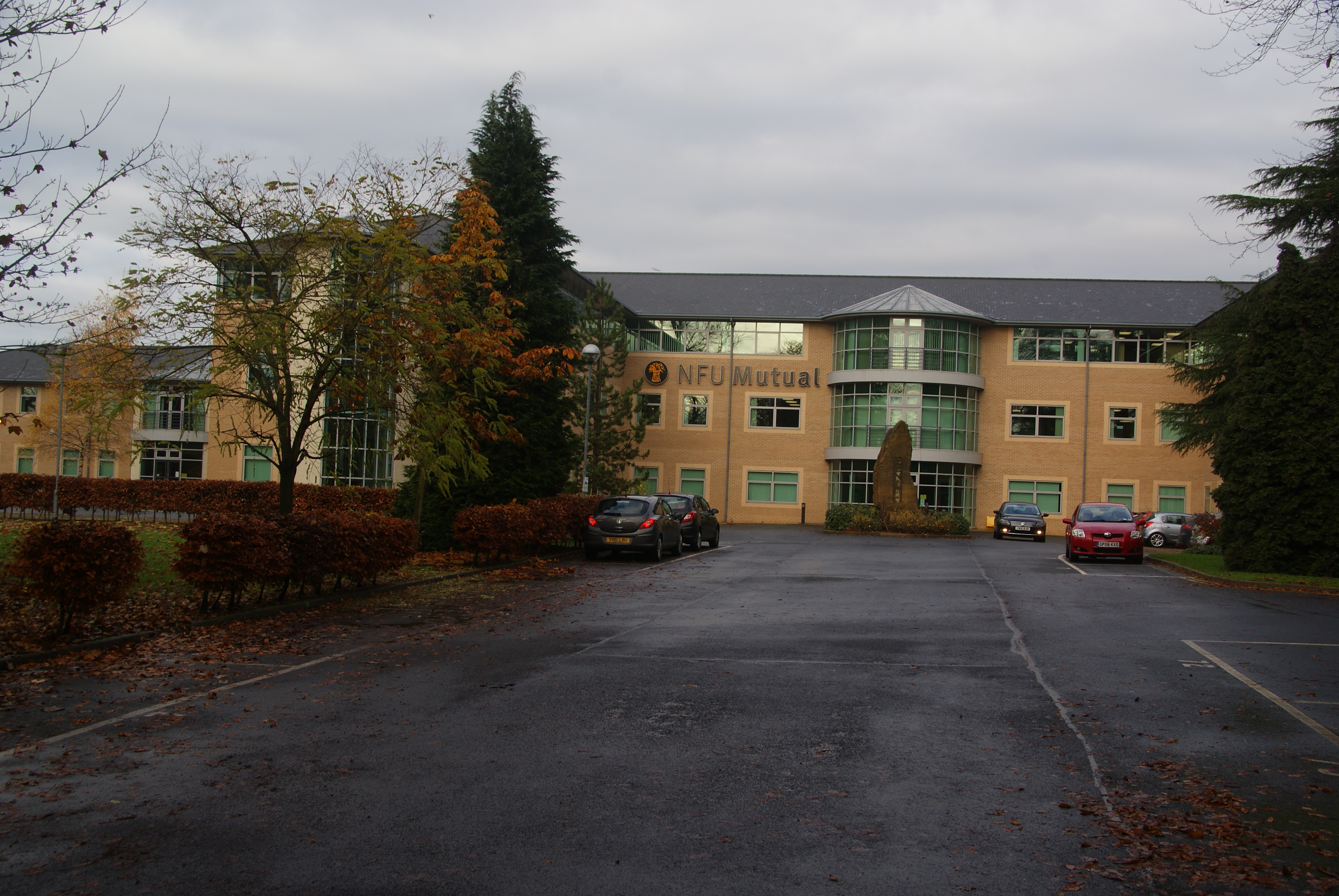
The York offices of NFU Mutual

When the coronavirus pandemic emerged (December 2019) NFU Mutual said its "standard Business Interruption cover usually requires damage to property, such as storms or fires, in order to be triggered, which means the majority of customers will not be covered for Coronavirus" and that "as a Mutual, one of our duties to our members is to remain solvent."

However, policyholders widely disputed NFU Mutual's position. In April 2020 an NFU Mutual customer questioned the insurer's position on business interruption in evidence to the House of Commons Treasury Select Committee.

NFU Mutual invited policyholders to claim for cancellation of advanced bookings coverage and did accept some claims under its Home and Lifestyle policies. In February 2023, the Insurance Post reported that complaints regarding a lack of coverage for COVID-19-related booking cancellations had been upheld. NFU Mutual acknowledged on its website that some businesses were not properly advised and may have missed out on cover for COVID-19-related booking cancellations, adding that businesses offering pre-March 2020 overnight accommodation who were not offered this extension should contact NFU Mutual for case review and potential compensation.

Commenting on this situation in February 2022, the Professional Association of Self-Caterers said: "NFU Mutual normally have a really good reputation amongst policyholders. They have though had a challenging Covid... Their cheaper Home and Lifestyle policy paid out for Covid, but the more expensive policy did not. They were the last major insurer to keep deducting Grants from pay-outs although thankfully they reversed this policy. Their Cancellation Advance Bookings add-on is a really good add on and we are trying to get others to offer similar."

The enduring dispute relates to non-damage denial of access cover extensions, on which NFU Mutual has asserted "This extension is intended to cover losses due to closure or restricted access by authorities following a specific incident or occurrence happening within the specified radius from the insured premises, and not by a nationwide event or global pandemic." explaining they thought they had sold cover only for events like a "bomb scare or a gas leak or a traffic accident".

Following the appeal to the UK Supreme Court (delivered January 2021) NFU Mutual published a statement saying it had no liability to meet claims for COVID-19 related business interruption. A number of policyholders formed a litigation group and announced plans to bring proceedings in a group action against NFU Mutual for which they instructed Penningtons Manches Cooper LLP.

In a BBC Midlands Today news item, one policyholder stated that the money from their claim had not been forthcoming from NFU Mutual for "we had an indemnity up to a certain level to protect us because something unfortunate had happened which would allow us to pick up after a very challenging time, and that money hasn't been forthcoming from NFU Mutual for over half a decade." NFU Mutual told the BBC it wouldn't be appropriate to comment but that it is defending the group action.

In March 2021 an article had alleged that NFU Mutual was among several firms deliberately delaying COVID-19 claims to avoid pay-outs, anticipating that businesses would fail before claims needed to be settled.

==== South Farm Limited and others v NFU Mutual ====
In July 2024 the case South Farm Limited and others v. The National Farmers Union Mutual Insurance Society Ltd (CL-2024-000309) came to court it was filed with an initial 37 claimants under a conditional fee arrangement with the law firm Pennington Manches Cooper. The solicitors elaborated on the case's significance: "This has the potential to be an extremely important case for a number of reasons. Once additional claimants in the approximately 90-strong group are formally added, this will be one of, if not the, largest Covid-19 group action claim against a single insurer in terms of claimant numbers.".

NFU Mutual requested a delay in the proceedings awaiting the decision of the Court of Appeal in International Entertainment Holdings Ltd & Others v Allianz Insurance PLC (CL-2022-000687), in the event that case largely went against NFU Mutual's position.

NFU Mutual a filed a defence in January 2025 in the High Court and a hearing took place on 19 December 2025 for case management and its progress was linked with the Innventure case.

==== Innventure Limited and others v NFU Mutual ====
NFU Mutual was in 2023 defending another class action by eight businesses, Innventure Limited and others v. The National Farmers Union Mutual Insurance Society Limited, associated with liabilities. This action was "recommenced" in July 2024, with a spokesman for these solicitors saying: "We are pleased to be able to represent the claimants in this historic case, which seeks to provide justice to the businesses who were unfairly interrupted in COVID-19." Court filings show a defence was filed for the Barings group action by NFU Mutual on 17 March 2025, and the claimants' reply was filed on 23 April 2025.

On 19 December 2025 for case management and its progress was linked with the South Farm case.

==== The joining of Innventure and South Farm cases ====
The litigation status was formalised in late 2025 ahead of a Case Management Conference (CCMC): on 21 November 2025, a Consent Order was issued by Mr Justice Jacobs.

A Case Management Conference (CCMC) was held on 19 December 2025 before Mr Justice Bryan. In the resulting Order for Directions, the court formally ordered that the Innventure (CL-2023-000589) and South Farm (CL-2024-000309) actions be heard and managed together.

The court directed the litigation toward a Preliminary Issue Trial to determine specific issues arising from the actions based on a statement of agreed and assumed facts.

Crucially, the court allowed amended pleadings that significantly expanded the scope of the defendant's potential liability. While the litigation already covered "Prevention of Access" (AOCA) claims, the updated directions formally incorporated disputes over Additional Increased Cost of Working (AICOW). This includes determining:

- Whether AICOW and "Increased Cost of Working" are mutually exclusive.
- Whether policyholders can claim up to an additional £50,000 limit for AICOW expenses.
- Whether the defendant's consent for these expenses was unreasonably withheld

By addressing these AICOW provisions as a primary issue, the court has broadened the "heads of damage" being litigated beyond simple business interruption, representing a notable increase in the defendant's total exposure. The Preliminary Issue Trial is scheduled for a total of 4.5 days (including 1.5 days of pre-trial reading) and is to take place not before 4 June 2026.The combined litigation represents over 100 separate venues across the two claim groups.

On January 12, 2026, the defendant, NFU Mutual, filed an amended defence in both of the linked proceedings.

On February 3, 2026, the Claimants in the South Farm and Innventure litigations filed an Amended Reply to incorporate landmark 2024 Court of Appeal rulings, specifically arguing that the definition of an "incident" under NFU Mutual's business interruption policies must be interpreted in line with the Allianz precedents to include COVID-19 occurrences.

A trial has been listed for the week of 9–13 November 2026.

==== Policyholder Sentiment ====
The situation has exposed NFU Mutual to criticism and caused it to express regret and concern. In a Chartered Institute of Insurance podcast at the beginning of the pandemic in May 2020, Nick Turner (at the time sales and agency director, and subsequently CEO) stated that the company would face challenges with its reputation and relationships from these matters:

"Trust is important everywhere in insurance... If you haven't written a policy wording very precisely to protect the insurance company and bring clarity to the consumer, then that is where the problems lie.. We [will] have to work to renew trust with certain customers [who may have been let down], it will be challenging this is going to run and run ... if [the issues around policies we have sold have put policyholders] into incredibly difficult positions or even administration, nothing is going to put a smile on [their] face."

Turner accepted that policyholders not receiving business interruption payments could impact their welfare and mental health in this same podcast. This perspective was reiterated in commentary by chairman Jim McLaren in another podcast, who said: "And you mentioned mental health and it's a crucial area and one that's often overlooked other than by those who are suffering from real mental health challenges. And again, the Mutual recognises that."

The significant resentment among policyholders regarding these repudiations of cover is evident through their direct testimonies. One affected policyholder articulated their frustration in 2020, stating: "They have quite happily taken the premiums for the last 15 years but the one time I need it I'm not going to get any help off them. It's disgusting that the insurance industry is allowed to do this.":

This perspective is reinforced by another impacted policyholder who, commenting on their experience with NFU Mutual, noted: "In good faith, we paid our premiums to NFU Mutual for years to protect us... we reached for the comfort and the security of the longstanding relationship with NFU Mutual and it turned to total ash.

In 2022, the Financial Reporting Council reviewed the accounting practices of NFU Mutual, asking for: "further information about the insurer’s potential exposure to claims for business interruption (BI) due to the Covid-19 pandemic and its approach to accounting for, and the disclosure of, a related potential group action threatened against the company."

The FRC stated NFU Mutual 'provided a satisfactory response' in 2021, with the NFU Mutual saying "the potential exposure regarding the nature and extent of the risk was not determined to be material."

In June 2025, MP Helen Morgan raised concerns in Parliament regarding NFU Mutual's progress in implementing the Financial Conduct Authority's recommendations from its January 22, 2021 "Dear CEOs" letter. Morgan posed a written question to the Chancellor of the Exchequer in the House of Commons, asking HM Treasury to comment on the "adequacy of the progress of (a) NFU Mutual and (b) other insurance providers in implementing the recommendations.".

Responding for the government Treasury minister Emma Reynolds MP said: "Under FCA rules, insurers must treat customers fairly. For example, the FCA’s rules require insurers to handle claims fairly and promptly; provide reasonable guidance to help a policyholder make a claim, and appropriate information on its progress; not reject a claim unreasonably; and settle claims promptly once settlement terms are agreed. The FCA has robust powers to take action against firms that do not comply with its rules."

==== Covid-19 Grants ====
In July 2020, NFU Mutual vehemently rejected the "accusation it misbehaved by deducting government grants from payouts," specifically regarding the value of government grants from coronavirus-related business interruption claims. However, Alistair Handyside, executive chairman of PASC UK, countered, stating: "Overwhelmingly our members are small, family run rural and coastal businesses for whom the Small Business Grant Fund is a critical lifeline intended to help businesses survive, not a grant to fund insurance company profits. Insurers that deduct grant money are threatening our long-term sustainability, and taking taxpayers' money designed to keep us afloat. The impacts of Covid-19 on small businesses in the tourism sector have been devastating. Many are now reluctant to make a claim, even though they are rightfully entitled, having paid their premium. We expect insurance companies to honour their contracts and not behave so poorly.

In November 2020, the company's conduct in deducting COVID-19 support grants from its payments triggered by COVID-19 were called into question in debate in the House of Commons with John Glen MP stating: "I am aware that NFU Mutual has continued to make such deductions. As stated in my letter, these grants are intended to provide emergency support to businesses at this time of crisis, and it is the Government's firm expectation that they are not to be deducted from business interruption insurance claims

=== Executive pay ===
In 2011, the issue of excessive pay has received negative attention, with the Insurance Times quoting an observer as saying: "Only two words come to mind – and they are 'snout' and 'trough'.

In 2013, a non-executive director of NFU Mutual, David Anderson, was scrutinised for his role as chief executive of the troubled Co-operative Bank during its financial collapse which had a capital short fall of £1.5bn. NFU Mutual's board left Anderson in place, going further and issuing a statement saying they benefited from his kind of advice and 'had no plans to review his appointment'.

=== Underinsurance Disputes ===
Northern Ireland dairy farmer Gary McConnell's case against NFU Mutual gained prominence in 2025 when NFU Mutual initially offered McConnell £18,000 for £55,000 in Storm Eowyn damages. McConnell, who asserted the insurer had assessed his property's sums insured, expressed "disgust and anger." Following media attention and intervention from his MP, Jim Allister, NFU Mutual reversed its decision and paid the claim in full. The insurer apologised, stating they "believed it was the correct decision given our understanding of the situation at the time," but later offered a Waiver of Underinsurance after investigating inconsistent information regarding the completion of building works. McConnell criticised the insurer's attempt to blame him for underinsurance.

Following McConnell's public statements, other farmers in Northern Ireland reported similar issues. Further attention was drawn by Derbyshire beef farmer David Hunt, who publicly disputed an NFU Mutual storm payout in December 2024. Hunt reported that his local NFU agent initially suggested keeping his claim "under the radar" to avoid head office involvement and advised a dangerous method for roof removal. Despite repair quotes of £32,000, NFU Mutual initially offered Hunt £4,800, which he claims he was "strong armed" into accepting. Hunt, a long-standing customer, demanded a review.

An internal email from NFU Mutual, noted in McCullagh's reported the Impartial Reporter newspaper, suggested potential systems level issues owing to conflicts between claim assessments and a software program used by staff.

Subsequent articles noted farmer criticisms of NFU Mutual for "losing its focus on core customers" and reported that current and former NFU agents expressed challenges in representing customers to head office, particularly regarding underinsurance.

In response to the criticism, an NFU Mutual spokesperson stated that the criticisms were "a fundamental misrepresentation of our business," asserting their pride in being the UK's leading rural insurer providing cover to three-quarters of the country's farms. They also noted their mechanisms for agent feedback.

NFU Mutual's underwriting practices came under public scrutiny following a 2018 report that Daily Mail features writer Guy Adams was allegedly refused home insurance due to his profession as a newspaper journalist. Adams claimed he was informed that journalists were now classified as "public figures," a categorization also applied to some Members of Parliament, leading to refusals of coverage. NFU Mutual acknowledged that it had previously declined applications from "some members of the media". Adams criticised the refusal as "extraordinary discrimination," expressing concern for journalists' ability to secure insurance if similar policies were widely adopted by other providers.

=== Other issues ===
In 2019 protests against badger culling were undertaken at the head office.

In 2019, errors by NFU Mutual, in failing to properly record insurance a customer had taken out, resulted in a customer having a £200,000 car seized and their customer facing criminal charges.
