= Farm assurance in Scotland =

The term farm assurance was first used in Scotland in the late 1980s to describe new certification schemes established by farmers, meat processors, consumers and supporting agencies, in response to emerging consumer concerns about food production. These schemes introduced independent, on-farm auditing of animal welfare, environmental care and staff competence.

Organisations involved included the National Farmers Union of Scotland, Scottish Association of Meat Wholesalers, the Scottish Consumer Council, Scottish Enterprise, Highlands and Islands Development Board, the Meat and Livestock Commission and the Scottish Agricultural College.

The first farm assurance scheme was the Scottish Pig Industry Initiative, established in 1990, followed by Farm Assured Scotch Lamb and Scottish Quality Cereals. Food produced through these schemes carry Scotch and Scottish branding (e.g. Scotch Beef). Other farming sectors in Scotland quickly followed. Scottish farmed salmon producers established similar assurance schemes (Scottish Quality Salmon and Shetland Quality Salmon) during the same period, followed by farmed trout (Scottish Quality Trout). Farmers in England established their own (and sometimes UK-wide) farm assurance schemes in the second half of the 1990s, these eventually being encompassed within Assured Food Standards which operates the "Red Tractor" mark. The rest of Europe took up farm assurance in the late 1990s (e.g. EurepGAP) with many other parts of the world adopting farm assurance in the early 2000s (e.g. GLOBALG.A.P).

The individuals who established farm assurance in Scotland included Maitland Mackie (SPII Chair), Jim Royan (FASL Chair), John Ross (NFUS President), John MacNaughton (SQBLA Chair), Alistair Donaldson (MLC Scotland Director), Brian Simpson (SQBLA Chief Executive), Ian Duncan Miller (livestock farmer), Alan Stevenson (SAMW), David Jack (cereal farmer), David Taylor (Scottish Enterprise), George Russell (Scottish Enterprise) and Peter Brown (HIDB then SPII & FASL Chief Executive).

== Scottish Food Quality Certification ==
Scottish Food Quality Certification is an independent company which monitors Scottish farm produce. Founded in 1995 it was the world's first farm and food certification business accredited to ISO Guide 65. By the late 1990s SFQC certified approximately 15,000 farms (circa 90% of Scottish farm output).

== Criticism ==
There has been discontent from farmers paying levies to various food assurance schemes about lacking influence over ongoing changes to standard criteria.

== See also ==
- Quality Meat Scotland
