= Assured Food Standards =

Owner of the Red Tractor quality mark in the United Kingdom

- Formation: 13 June 2000
- Legal status: Not-for-profit company
- Purpose: Food production standards
- Region served: England, Northern Ireland and Wales
- Members: Food producers, processors, contract caterers, wholesalers, food service and 78,000 farmers
- Owner: National Farmers' Union of England and Wales; National Farmers' Union of Scotland; Ulster Farmers' Union; AHDB; Dairy UK; British Retail Consortium; Food and Drink Federation
- Chief Executive: Jim Moseley
- Main organ: AFS board (Chairman - Christine Tacon)
- Website: https://redtractor.org.uk

Assured Food Standards is a United Kingdom company which licenses the Red Tractor quality mark, a farm assurance programme for food products, animal feed and fertiliser. Numerous cases of animal abuse have been documented on Red Tractor assured farms.

== History ==
The Red Tractor scheme was launched in 2000 by the National Farmers Union of England and Wales, with the logo originally known as the Little Red Tractor, and also the British Farm Standard. It was launched on 13 June 2000.

According to The Guardian, around the time of the Red Tractor scheme's launch in June 2000, the National Farmers’ Union commissioned a survey which found that “an alarming 70% of the British public have no idea what food the farmers in their local area produce.”

In 2005, the organisation kept its Red Tractor quality mark, but was renamed from "British Farm Standard" to the "Assured Food Standards". The company is limited by guarantee and permitted to operate without the word "limited" in its company name.

In April 2009, Cains Brewery of Liverpool produced the first lager, Cains Export, to be accredited by the Red Tractor. Since June 2010, Carling cans of lager have displayed the logo, as the barley used has been certified.

== Operations ==
All stages of food production are independently certified (inspected) to the Red Tractor standards before food can be labelled with the Red Tractor logo.

The Red Tractor Farm Assurance scheme is divided in different sectors:

- Pigs - 90% of British pig producers
- Dairy (Assured Dairy Farms - former National Dairy Farm Assured Scheme)
- Beef and Lamb
- Fresh produce
- Poultry (Assured Chicken Production. Members of the British Poultry Council will produce poultry meat to the Red Tractor standard, meaning they are kept in more humane surroundings.)
- Crops and sugar beet (Assured Combinable Crops Scheme)

Processed Vegetable Growers' Association Red Tractor cover an extensive range of products, including meat and poultry, dairy products, breakfast cereals, and fruit and vegetables.

Certification bodies the Red Tractor schemes work with include:

- NSF-CMi in Long Hanborough
- SAI Global in Milton Keynes (a spin off of Standards Australia)
- Northern Ireland Food Chain Certification, based in Lisburn
- Product Authentication International

In 2009, around £10 billion of products were sold bearing the logo. A royalty fee is charged to bear the logo.

The union flag displayed as part of the Red Tractor logo gives a guarantee that the produce was farmed, processed and packed in the United Kingdom. To qualify as "farmed", animals must be born, reared and slaughtered in the UK. This is in contrast to a simple union flag logo without the Red Tractor, which is often used to simply denote UK based processing. A BBC investigation in 2013 revealed that there was a less than 1 per cent chance that a pack of Tesco pork chops labelled as British came from the British Isles.

== Environmental Considerations ==
The Red Tractor assurance scheme includes standards that relate to environmental protection. These standards aim to minimise and mitigate the risk of contamination and pollution. For assured farms in all categories, potential pollutants, including organic manure and silage, must be stored in a manner that minimised the risk of contamination and pollution to crops, feedstuffs, animals, soils, groundwater and watercourses. The scheme's website notes that farmers only use products like pesticides and fertilisers if this is "absolutely necessary" for crop health.

In July 2022, a joint investigation by The Guardian and The Bureau of Investigative Journalism tested several Red Tractor approved pork products including joints, chops and mince. Ten percent were found to be infected with enterococci bacteria "that has showed resistance to a 'last resort' antibiotic used to treat serious illnesses in humans".

According to an internal government report seen by The Times, Red Tractor farms were 'more likely' to pollute the environment than those that were not part of the scheme.

In October 2025, the Advertising Standards Authority ruled that a Red Tractor advert was misleading and that it should substantiate what "farmed with care" and "all our standards are met" mean. The complaint was made by the charity River Action who noted that many severe cases of pollution originated from Red Tractor farms. The complaint brought by the environmental charity River Action, cited a 2020 Environment Agency (EA) assessment. That assessment found that, of 4,064 pollution incidents recorded between 2014 and 2019, farms assured by Red Tractor were responsible for 62% of category 1 and 2 incidents and 56% of category 3 incidents. The EA report concluded that Red Tractor membership was “not currently an indicator of good environmental performance” and that such farms were more likely than others to cause pollution incidents.

In its 15 October ruling, the Advertising Standards Authority (ASA) referred to EA data showing “around half of RT farms being not fully compliant” and noted the EA's conclusion that “Red Tractor membership is not currently an indicator of good environmental performance.” The ASA found that the evidence provided by Red Tractor to demonstrate compliance with basic legislative standards and a good environmental outcome was insufficient to substantiate the claim which “farmed with care… all our standards are met” conveyed to consumers.

Further inspection data from 2020 to 2025, obtained by River Action through Environmental Information Requests, indicated further non-compliance of inspected farms. During that period, 4,353 (60%) Red Tractor–assured farms were identified as breaching environmental regulations, with 19,305 instances of non-compliance recorded.

== Animal abuse ==
In July 2018 several UK media publications revealed serious cases of animal abuses at several farms that had passed recent inspections by the Assured Food Standards scheme.

In June 2019, three poultry farms in Lincolnshire belonging to Moy Park were found to be keeping animals in "utterly dismal conditions" where chicken carcasses were left to rot in sheds holding up to 30,000 birds. The farms, which supply meat to major British supermarkets like Tesco and Sainsbury's, were all certified under the Red Tractor scheme.

In August 2019, Hogwood Farm in Warwickshire was suspended from the Red Tractor scheme after videos obtained by animal rights charity Viva! emerged showing "terrified pigs struck with metal riding crops and hand tools" and "dead pigs dumped into rotting piles". Tesco suspended their relationship with the farm.

In August 2020 a pig farm in Leicestershire was dropped from the Red Tractor scheme after undercover footage showed sick pigs being left to die, painful conditions that had been left untreated and others with acute malnutrition.

In September 2020, an investigation into a chicken farm that supplied Tesco found fast growing birds that were in chronic pain and others that could barely stand up. Avara Foods, which owns the farm, said an internal investigation was carried out which "didn't highlight any welfare concerns".

In March 2021, Dispatches (TV programme) went undercover at a Moy Park chicken site. They found birds with "horrific injuries" and guidance issued to kill chicks deemed "lame" or "too small". Over 4000 chicks died or were culled during the 11 days of filming.

In June 2021, footage was filmed at a pig farm in Yorkshire showing dying pigs left to rot among living and workers kicking animals too crippled to stand. The farm was removed from the Red Tractor schema and dropped by Tesco, Asda, Sainsbury's and Morrisons.

In July 2021, secret cameras captured chickens that had died of thirst and dead birds left to rot at three Red Tractor approved sites. The chickens were being supplied for major British retailers including Tesco, Sainsbury's, Lidl and KFC.

In October 2021, the animal rights charity Viva! found "dead and wounded" turkeys amongst living ones at a farm that supplies Sainsbury's.

In late 2021, undercover footage was shot on a Red Tractor assured farm by the BBC's investigative documentary series Panorama. Farmers were filmed beating cows with spades, dragging lame cows out of sheds using tractors and separating calves from their mothers.

In May 2022, the animal rights charity Viva! placed hidden cameras in a Red Tractor assured duck farm operated by Quack Duck Eggs. Released footage showed workers abusing ducks, as well as infestations of rodents and maggots. In response to the footage Co-op Food suspended the farm as a supplier.

In June 2022, an as yet unknown disease emerged in pigs at a Red Tractor assured farm in Norfolk. Covert drone footage captured by energy firm Ecotricity showed farm workers shooting at disease ridden pigs with many animals dying in front of each other.

In July 2022, an article published in The Independent alleged goats were being subjected to "violence and neglect" under the Red Tractor label. Hidden cameras captured goats so lame they were unable to walk and piles of dead goats left to rot outside a Delamere Dairy farm.

In August 2022, industry whistle-blowers claimed millions of Red Tractor assured factory farm chickens had "died slowly of heat exhaustion" after inadequate ventilation and cooling during the 2022 United Kingdom heat wave. The Department for Environment, Food and Rural Affairs said it was "deeply concerned" about the issue and that the sheer scale of the mortalities had prompted an investigation by officials.

In October 2022, The Belfast Telegraph reported a Red Tractor assured pig farm was facing 3 counts of causing unnecessary suffering to animals. An inspection by Department of Agriculture, Environment and Rural Affairs found conditions to be unsanitary with pigs living in their own feces and several dead piglets that had succumbed to bacteria infections.

In December 2022, footage shared with The Independent showed pigs that were "given electric shocks, hit, kicked and thrown as they were loaded onto lorries" at several Red Tractor assured farms.

In January 2023, an investigation by Viva! found cows that were emaciated, lame and struggling to walk on a Red Tractor approved farm that supplies Costa Coffee. The animals were handled roughly, with one being hit in the udder and others being slapped or having their heads pushed.

In March 2023, footage emerged showing farmers kicking and slapping pigs at a Red tractor assured farm. The animals were being cannibalised alive with farmers taking up to 13 hours to remove dead ones from sheds. Bins were filled with rotting pig corpses.

In August 2023, chickens at a Red Tractor assured farm were found "collapsing in agony, deformed and dying" at farms supplying the Co-op supermarket chain. Hidden cameras showed workers tossing hundreds of dead chickens into bins, in one case laughing and saying "I’ve never seen so many maggots in my life".

In November 2023, animal rights charity Viva captured footage at a Red Tractor assured dairy farm in Wales. Corpses of cows were seen being dragged outside the complex including one that was half-eaten. An animal welfare scientist who viewed parts of the footage said some of the allegations were ‘concerning’ and ‘common to the dairy farming industry’.

In May 2025 undercover filming at a Red Tractor certified pig farm operated by Cranswick Plc observed numerous examples of cruelty including piglets being killed by being grabbed by their hind legs and smashed on to the floor.

In August 2025 further undercover footage from another Red Tractor certified Cranswick facility documented numerous examples of pigs being routinely struck with force and going without necessary veterinary care when injured.

== See also ==
- Food Standards Agency
- Little Red Tractor, a children's cartoon on CBeebies
- Soil Association – certificates British organic food
- Sugarwise – certificates sugar claims in food and drink
- United Kingdom Accreditation Service
- Cruelty to animals
