= Minette Batters, Baroness Batters =

British farmer (born 1967)

The Right Honourable The Baroness Batters DL
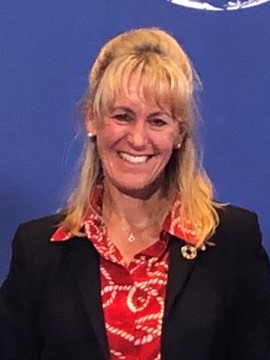
- Batters in 2021

Member of the House of Lords
- Lord Temporal
- Life peerage 16 August 2024

President of the National Farmers' Union of England and Wales
- In office 2018–2024
- Deputy: Guy Smith; Tom Bradshaw
- Preceded by: Meurig Raymond
- Succeeded by: Tom Bradshaw

Personal details
- Born: Minette Bridget Hill; 28 May 1967 (age 59)
- Party: Crossbench
- Children: 2
- Occupation: Farmer

Minette Bridget Batters, Baroness Batters, DL (née Hill; born 28 May 1967), is a British farmer who was the president of the National Farmers' Union of England and Wales from 2018 to 2024. She has been a member of the House of Lords since 2024.

== Early life ==
Batters was born on 28 May 1967. She was brought up on a tenant farm near Salisbury and always wanted to be a farmer. She attended Godolphin School, an independent school in Salisbury. As a teenager she worked with horses for David Elsworth, including riding over 30 winners in races. Her father encouraged her to develop a career instead of becoming involved in farming, so she attended catering college and then ran a catering company. In 1998, when her father retired, she took over the farm's tenancy.

== Career ==
Batters is a tenant farmer of a 300-acre mixed farm near Downton in Wiltshire. As well as the farm, she runs a catering business and has diversified into using a renovated barn as a wedding venue. She was a co-founder of the 2010s campaigns Ladies in Beef and the Great British Beef Week.

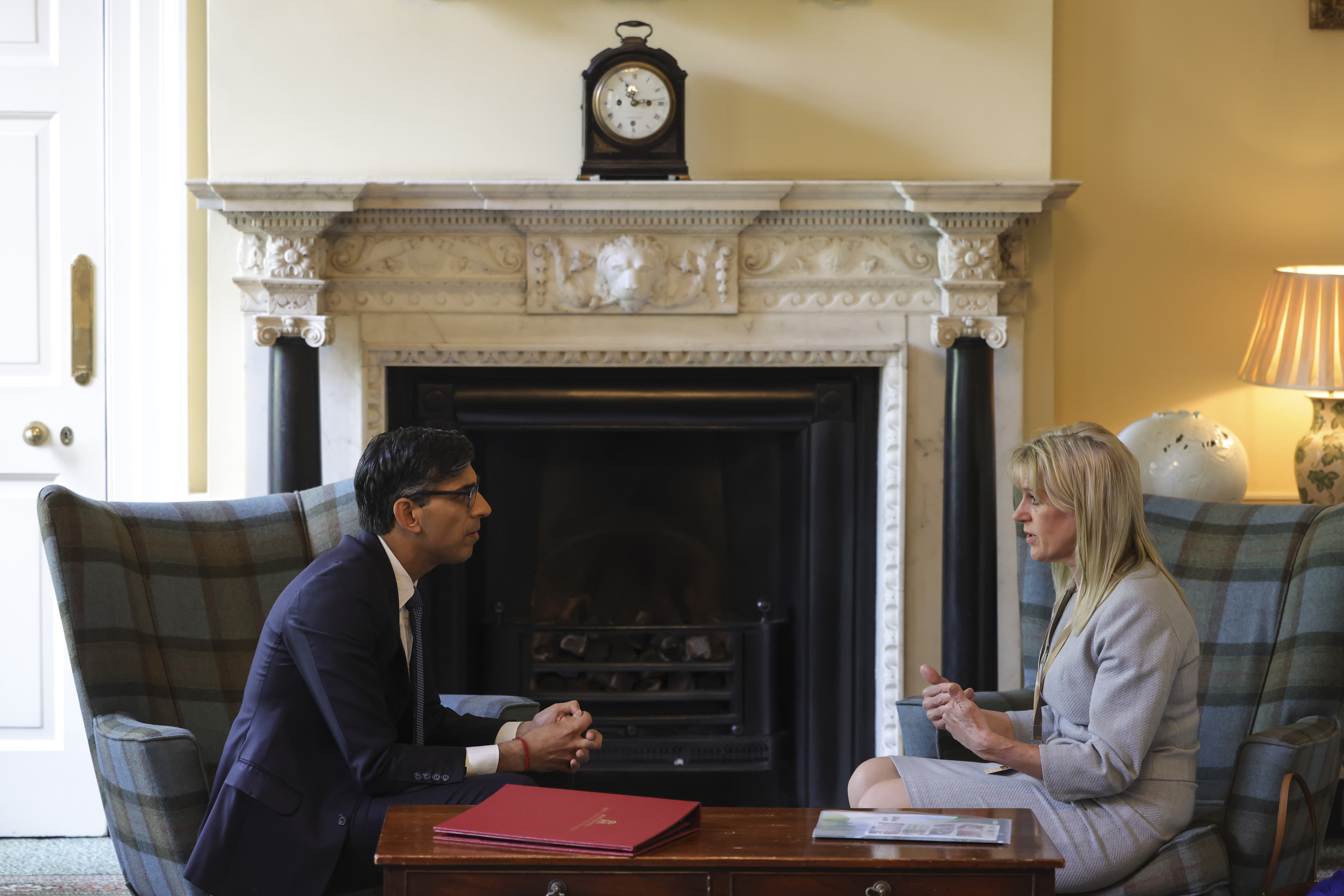
Batters with Rishi Sunak at Number 10 in May 2023

She joined the NFU when she started farming, and rose to be county chair and a member of several NFU committees. She served as vice-president of the NFU from 2014 to 2018 and was voted president of the organisation in 2018. In 2020 and 2022 she was re-elected to the post for further two-year terms.

In her role as vice-president and then president, Batters represented the farming community at a time of great change. She agreed a target for the NFU of net zero greenhouse gas emissions by 2040. Leaving the European Union – with its freedom of movement for farm labour, as well as the Single Market and Common Agricultural Policy – resulted in significant changes to farming, with new regulatory and transitional subsidy arrangements. Batters supported orderly change and maintenance of high standards in UK agriculture. She worked with Michael Gove while he was Secretary of State for the environment. She encourages working with the government on agriculture and trade policies so that the farming community can produce food that is globally competitive, while also improving the environment and mitigating climate change. In 2020 she was part of a campaign to ensure that post-Brexit agricultural trade agreements, such as with the USA, did not allow import of food produced under conditions that would be illegal in the UK.

After her final term as NFU president ended in 2024, she started a new farm enterprise, growing flowers.

=== Farming Profitability Review ===
In April 2025, Batters was appointed by the UK government to lead a six-month Farming Profitability Review, supported by a newly formed Profitability Unit within the Department for Environment, Food and Rural Affairs.

The review was published in December 2025 and set out 57 recommendations intended to inform the government's food strategy, farming roadmap and land use framework.

In response to the review, the government announced a new Farming and Food Partnership Board and published its response to the review on 24 June 2026.

== Honours and awards ==
In November 2020, Batters was included in the BBC Radio 4 Woman's Hour Power List 2020. In August 2021 she was appointed a deputy lieutenant of Wiltshire.

Batters was nominated for a life peerage in the 2024 Dissolution Honours. She was created Baroness Batters, of Downton in the County of Wiltshire, on 16 August 2024 and is a crossbench member of the House of Lords.

== Personal life ==
She is divorced with twins.

== Writing ==
Batters's memoir, Harvest, was published by Ebury Press in May 2026. The book combines memoir with commentary on British farming and food policy.
