= Tom Bradshaw (farmer) =

British farmer (born 1982)

President of the National Farmers' Union of England and Wales
- In office 2024–present
- Preceded by: Minette Batters

Personal details
- Spouse: Emily Bradshaw
- Children: 2
- Occupation: Farmer

Thomas William Bradshaw (born July 1982) is a British farmer who has served as president of the National Farmers' Union of England and Wales since 2024.

== Family and education ==
Bradshaw was born in 1982 to David and Alison Bradshaw, who ran a family-owned arable and dairy farm in Fordham, Essex. He has an older and a younger brother. He was educated at nearby Colchester Royal Grammar School and earned a degree in agricultural business management from Imperial College at Wye in Kent.

Bradshaw and his wife Emily are the parents of two children.

== Career ==
After graduating from university, Bradshaw took over the management of his family's farm in North Essex while also operating a contract farming business covering 950 hectares of combinable crops, including wheat, barley and oilseed rape. He helped to diversify the business away from dairy farming to include equestrian activities and renewable energy production.

In 2010, Bradshaw was awarded a Nuffield farming scholarship, enabling him to observe agricultural practices in the United States, Australia, New Zealand and Europe.

Bradshaw joined the combinable crops board of the National Farmers' Union of England and Wales (NFU) in 2014 and became chair of its national crops board in 2018. In 2019 he was appointed NFU vice-president, then deputy president. He was elected president of the NFU in February 2024.

In November 2024, Bradshaw gave a speech at Church House in London during protests by farmers against the government's plans to change inheritance tax on agricultural land, and in January 2025 he delivered a petition signed by 270,000 members of the public to 10 Downing Street, urging the government to overturn the policy.
