= Donald Curry, Baron Curry of Kirkharle =

British farmer and businessman

The Right Honourable The Lord Curry of Kirkharle CBE
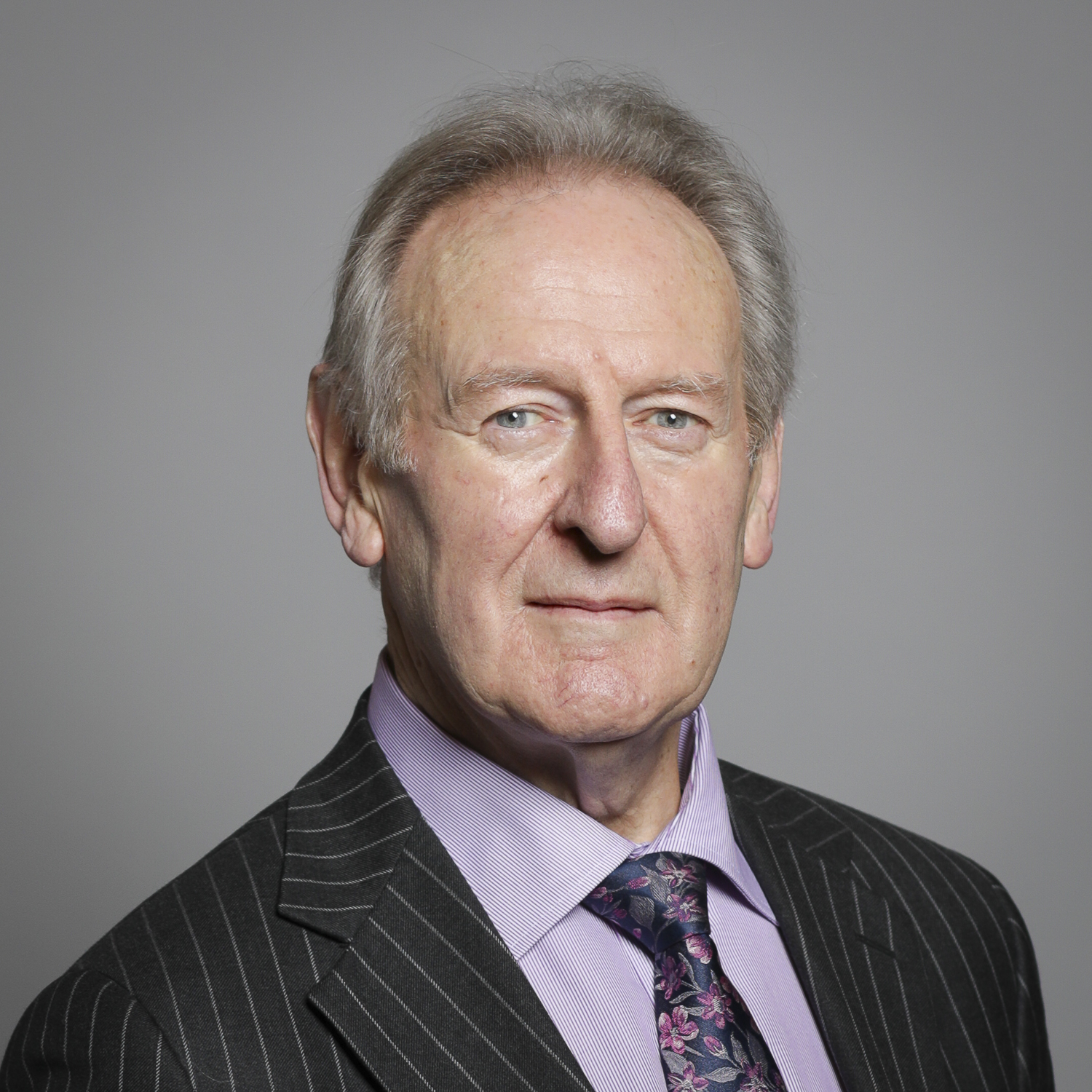

Member of the House of Lords
- Lord Temporal
- Life peerage 13 October 2011 – 30 April 2026

Personal details
- Born: 4 April 1944 (age 82)

Donald Thomas Younger Curry, Baron Curry of Kirkharle, CBE (born 4 April 1944) is a British farmer and businessman who is the former chair of NFU Mutual (2003–2011) and non-executive chair of the Better Regulation Executive, and a former member of the House of Lords.

Curry was appointed a Commander of the Order of the British Empire (CBE) in the 1997 New Year Honours, and was knighted in the 2001 Birthday Honours.

In 2001–2 he chaired the Policy Commission on the Future of Farming and Food, known as the Curry Commission, which produced a report for the Secretary of State for Environment, Food and Rural Affairs.

On the recommendation of the House of Lords Appointments Commission, he was created a crossbench (independent) life peer on 13 October 2011, taking the title Baron Curry of Kirkharle, of Kirkharle in the County of Northumberland. He was introduced in the House of Lords on 24 October 2011. In the introduction ceremony, his supporters were the Lord Plumb and the Baroness Byford.

Lord Curry is a member of the all-party parliamentary group Christians in Parliament.

During the House of Lords debate on the Assisted Dying Bill in September 2025, he argued that there is "absolutely no question that this Bill, if passed, would devalue the importance of human life, and economics would become part of the decision-making process."

== Personal life ==
Since September 1976, he has been married to Lady Rhoda. They had three children, a daughter, Jane, and two sons, Jonathan and Craig. Jane, who was born with a severe learning disability, died aged 42 in 2014.

As a result of their experience caring for Jane, in 1990 Rhoda and Donald set up a charity to provide residential care called At Home in the Community, which Lord Curry chaired for 25 years.

Orders of precedence in the United Kingdom
Preceded by The Lord Singh of Wimbledon	Gentlemen; Baron Curry of Kirkharle	Followed by The Lord O'Donnell
