= National Farmers' Union of Scotland =

Organization

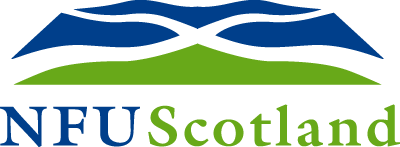
- Abbreviation: NFUS
- Founded: 1913; 113 years ago
- Type: Employer association
- Headquarters: Rural Centre - West Mains, Ingliston, Midlothian, Scotland, EH28 8LT
- Location: Scotland
- President: Andrew Connon
- Vice-Presidents: Duncan Macaliste and Robert Neill
- Treasurer: Rupert Shaw
- Main organ: NFUS National Council
- Affiliations: NFU Mutual Insurance Sister organisations: National Farmers' Union of England and Wales; Ulster Farmers' Union
- Website: http://www.nfus.org.uk/

The National Farmers' Union of Scotland (NFU Scotland, NFUS) is an employer association organisation that represents the interests of the Scotland's farming industry. It was formed in 1913, and has approximately 10,000 members who are farmers, crofters and others involved in Scottish agriculture.

It is organisationally independent of the larger and similarly named National Farmers' Union (NFU) in England and Wales.

== History ==
In 1972, the NFUS — alongside other employers' associations National Farmers' Union of England and Wales and the Ulster Farmers' Union — set up the 'British Agriculture Bureau' to represent their interests in the European Economic Community affairs, and later in European Union affairs.

In the late 2000's, proposals were made to reform the EU Common Agricultural Policy by altering the direct payment system. NFU Scotland declared their opposition to the reform package with NFUS policy director Scott Walker stating it would have a disproportionate negative impact on big farms.

During the 2014 Scottish independence referendum, the NFUS did not officially endorce either independence or union. Former NFUS presidents Ian Grant, Jim Stobo, Sandy Inverarity, Sylvester Campbell, George Lyon and Sandy Mole supported voting for Scotland staying in the UK. Former presidents John Ross, John Cameron, Jim Walker and John Kinnaird supported voting for Scottish independence.

In February 2015, Allan Bowie was elected president of NFU Scotland, succeeding Nigel Miller who had held the role since 2011.

Following a review of the Scottish Agricultural Wages Board (SAWB) in Decembers 2015, MSP Richard Lochhead, the Rural Affairs Secretary, announced that the SAWB would be retained to protect farmworkers. NFU Scotland—which has and continues to campaign against the SAWB—criticised the decision, with NFUS chief executive Scott Walker describing the board as redundant.

In February 2017, Andrew McCornick successfully challenged incumbent Allan Bowie, and became president of NFU Scotland.

Martin Kennedy was elected unopposed as NFUS president in February 2021. In February 2023 he was re-elected without a challenger.

== Structure and function ==
According to the NFUS' constitution, the president is elected by the NFUS National Council for a term of two years, and no individual may be president for more than two consecutive terms. All though the executive body of the organisation, it is unclear how many people sit on the NFUS National Council, with the constitution only stating that the president, vice-presidents, and the members of NFUS' regional boards.

Along with the NFU, the Ulster Farmers' Union, and other farming and food organisations, NFUS owns the Assured Food Standards company, which administers the Red Tractor food quality mark.

NFU Scotland selects a three of the six employers' representatives on the seventeen member Scottish Agricultural Wages Board.

=== British Agriculture Bureau ===
The British Agriculture Bureau (BAB) is the joint office of the NFU, NFU Scotland and the Ulster Farmers' Union in Brussels. The BAB lobbies for the British farming industry in regards to European Union policy.

== See also ==
- Agriculture in Scotland
- Farm assurance in Scotland
- National Farmers' Union of England and Wales – Sister organisation in England & Wales
- Ulster Farmers' Union – Northern Irish sister organisation
- Farmers' Union of Wales – Similar organisation in Wales
- Irish Farmers' Association – Similar organisation in Ireland
- Unite the Union (Food, Drink and Agricultural Section) – represents farmworkers in the UK and Ireland
