= British Poultry Council =

- Abbreviation: BPC
- Type: Trade association
- Legal status: Non-profit
- Purpose: Poultry farming in the UK
- Location: 5 - 11 Lavington Street, Southwark, London, SE1 0NZ
- Members: 70 companies
- Chief Executive: Richard Griffiths
- Affiliations: Expand: Association of Poultry Processors and Poultry Trade in the EU countries (AVEC); European Live Poultry and Poultry Hatching Association (ELPHA); Assured Food Standards
- Website: www.britishpoultry.org.uk

The British Poultry Council is the United Kingdom's national trade group for the poultry meat industry, representing them in public relations, policy making and standardisation.

== Structure ==
It is situated just off Southwark Street (A3200) near the Blue Fin Building, and just south of the Tate Modern.

Members include Bernard Matthews and the Faccenda Group. The CEO has been Richard Griffiths since 2017.

== Scholarships program ==
The council offers 2 yearly 3,500 pound scholarships to Harper Adams University.

In March 2016 it was announced that the council would be put in charge of the code on chicken-farming from 27 April 2016. It has produced new non-statutory guidance on how to comply with the legislation.
