= Farm assurance =

Certification for agricultural products

Farm assurance is product certification for agricultural products that emphasises the principles of quality assurance. The emphasis on quality assurance means that, in addition to product inspection, farm assurance schemes may include standards and certification for traceability, production methods, transport, and supplies.

All farm assurance schemes claim to ensure high standards of animal welfare, although there is great variation in the requirements that relate to how animals should be kept and cared for.

In our United Kingdom and Australia, the major farm assurance programmes are based on a quality management system for food safety that originated with the US space agency NASA, known as Hazard Analysis and Critical Control Points (HACCP). In these and other countries, assurance is underpinned by principles and standards for good manufacturing practice (GMP), good agricultural practice (GAP), good hygienic practice and good trade practice.

Examples of farm assurance schemes include:

- organic certification
- The Non-GMO Project, a US organization whose Product Verification Program certifies products that follow best practices to avoid GMO contamination
- Red Tractor mark, a UK quality assurance programme for animal products and crops
- Freedom Food, animal welfare assurance from the RSPCA
- IKB (Integrated chain control system), Netherlands programme
- the Australian dairy industry's range of HAACP-based programmes

In 2004, 65% of United Kingdom farm production was farm assured, and by 2006, £6 billion worth of food was packed annually under the United Kingdom's Red Tractor farm assurance mark, including over 90% of the country's pig and dairy production.

Some farm assurance schemes are given legal force, either by use of trademarks or by oversight by government regulators of agriculture and food standards. While mostly associated with food production, farm assurance can be applied to other agricultural products, such as textiles, flowers, tobacco and biofuels.

In order to obtain farm product certification, assurance may be required for farm supplies. For example, the UK's Red Tractor scheme is supported by assurance programmes for fodder (UFAS, FEMAS) and fertiliser (FIAS).

== Other quality standards ==
Other widely used agricultural quality standards are based entirely on product inspection, and do not rely on other aspects of quality assurance. One example of such a programme is the United States Quality Standards for grading, certification and verification: the USDA beef grades depend on physical attributes of the meat, plus the age of the animal.

== See also ==
- Certified Naturally Grown
- Hazard Analysis and Critical Control Points – Systematic preventive approach to food safety
- Quality Assurance International – U.S.-based international organic certification company
- Soil Association – British registered charity
- Sugarwise – UK certification authority for sugar claims on food and drink
