= 2024 Dissolution Honours =

British government recognitions

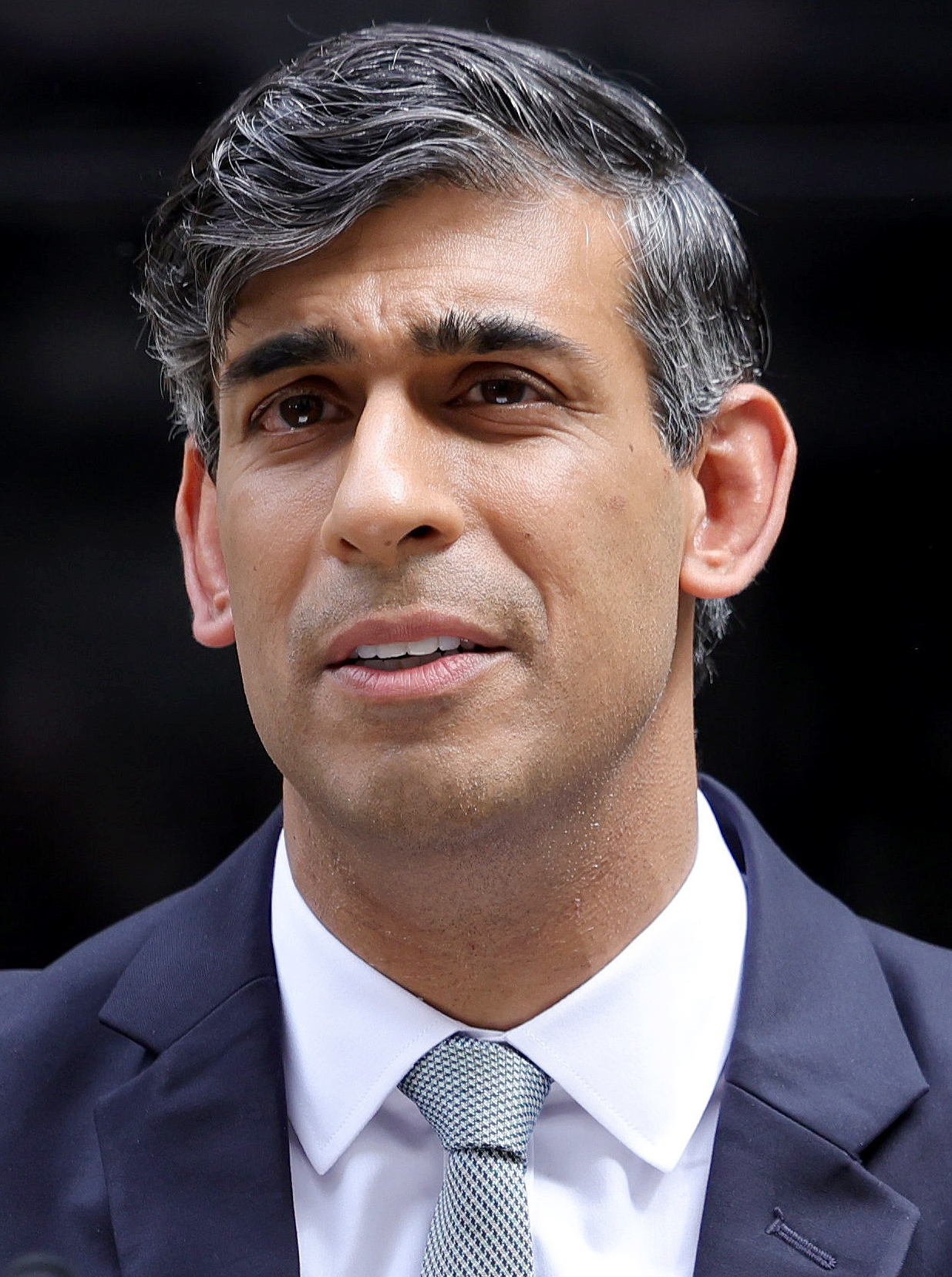
Outgoing Prime Minister Rishi Sunak

The 2024 Dissolution Honours List was issued on 4 July 2024, the day of the 2024 general election. They were gazetted in The London Gazette on 7 August 2024.

== Life peerages ==
=== Conservative ===
- The Rt Hon Sir Graham Stuart Brady – Lately Member of Parliament for Altrincham and Sale West, and Chairman of the 1922 Committee; to be Baron Brady of Altrincham, of Birch-in-Rusholme in the County of Greater Manchester – 19 August 2024
- The Rt Hon Christopher Stephen Grayling – Lately Member of Parliament for Epsom and Ewell, and former Secretary of State for Transport, Lord Chancellor and Secretary of State for Justice and Leader of the House of Commons; to be Baron Grayling, of Ashtead in the County of Surrey – 20 August 2024
- The Rt Hon Dame Eleanor Fulton Laing, DBE – Lately Member of Parliament for Epping Forest, lately Deputy Speaker of the House of Commons; to be Baroness Laing of Elderslie, of Epping Forest in the County of Essex – 22 August 2024
- Craig Mackinlay, JP – Lately Member of Parliament for South Thanet; to be Baron Mackinlay of Richborough, of Rochester in the County of Kent – 23 August 2024
- The Rt Hon Theresa Mary May – Lately Member of Parliament for Maidenhead, former Prime Minister and Home Secretary; to be Baroness May of Maidenhead, of Sonning in the Royal County of Berkshire – 21 August 2024
- The Rt Hon Sir Alok Kumar Sharma, KCMG – Lately Member of Parliament for Reading West and former Secretary of State for Business, Energy and Industrial Strategy, Secretary of State for International Development and President for COP26; to be Baron Sharma, of Reading in the Royal County of Berkshire – 20 August 2024
- Liam David Scott Booth-Smith – Lately No 10 Downing Street Chief of Staff; to be Baron Booth-Smith, of Newcastle-under-Lyme in the County of Staffordshire – 21 August 2024

=== Labour ===
- The Rt Hon Dame Margaret Mary Beckett, GBE – Former Foreign Secretary and former Deputy Leader of the Labour Party; to be Baroness Beckett, of Old Normanton in the City of Derby – 14 August 2024
- John Robert Cryer – Lately Member of Parliament for Leyton and Wanstead; to be Baron Cryer, of Leyton in the London Borough of Waltham Forest – 15 August 2024
- The Rt Hon Harriet Ruth Harman, KC – Lately Member of Parliament for Camberwell and Peckham, and formerly Deputy Leader of the Labour Party; to be Baroness Harman, of Peckham in the London Borough of Southwark – 19 August 2024
- The Rt Hon Lady (Margaret Eve) Hodge DBE – Lately Member of Parliament for Barking and former Minister of State for the Department for Culture, Media and Sport; to be Baroness Hodge of Barking, of Great Massingham in the County of Norfolk – 14 August 2024
- The Rt Hon Kevan David Jones – Lately Member of Parliament for North Durham and former Minister for Veterans at the Ministry of Defence; to be Baron Beamish, of Beamish in the County of Durham – 15 August 2024
- Barbara Mary Keeley – Lately Member of Parliament for Worsley and Eccles South and formerly Shadow Minister for Music and Tourism; to be Baroness Keeley, of Worsley in the City of Salford – 13 August 2024
- The Rt Hon John Francis Spellar – Lately Member of Parliament for Warley and formerly Comptroller of the Household in the Whips' Office; to be Baron Spellar, of Smethwick in the County of the West Midlands – 12 August 2024
- The Rt Hon Dame Rosalie Winterton DBE – Lately Member of Parliament for Doncaster Central and former Deputy Speaker in the House of Commons; to be Baroness Winterton of Doncaster, of Doncaster in the County of South Yorkshire – 13 August 2024

=== Liberal Democrats ===
- Caroline Valerie Pidgeon, MBE – Lately Leader of the Liberal Democrats in the London Assembly; to be Baroness Pidgeon, of Newington in the London Borough of Southwark – 12 August 2024

=== Ulster Unionist Party ===
- Thomas Beatty Elliott, MLA – Member of the Legislative Assembly for Fermanagh and South Tyrone and former leader of the Ulster Unionist Party; to be Baron Elliott of Ballinamallard, of Ballinamallard in the County of Fermanagh – 16 August 2024

=== Crossbench peerages ===
- Minette Bridget Batters – Former President of the National Farmers’ Union of England and Wales; to be Baroness Batters, of Downton in the County of Wiltshire – 16 August 2024
- Dr Hilary Dawn Cass, OBE FRCN FRCGP – Former president of the Royal College of Paediatrics and Child Health; to be Baroness Cass, of Barnet in Greater London – 22 August 2024

== Most Honourable Order of the Bath ==
=== Knights Commander of the Order of the Bath (KCB) ===
- The Rt Hon Oliver Dowden CBE – Deputy Prime Minister, Chancellor of the Duchy of Lancaster and Secretary of State for the Cabinet Office. Formerly Secretary of State for Digital, Culture, Media and Sport, and Chairman of the Conservative Party. For political and public service.
- The Rt Hon Julian Richard Smith CBE – Formerly Government Chief Whip and Secretary of State for Northern Ireland. For political and public service.
- The Rt Hon Robert Ben Lobban Wallace – Formerly Secretary of State for Defence. For political and public service.

== The Most Excellent Order of the British Empire ==
=== Dames Commander of the Order of the British Empire (DBE) ===
- The Rt Hon Thérèse Anne Coffey – Formerly Deputy Prime Minister, Secretary of State for Environment, Food and Rural Affairs, Secretary of State for Health and Social Care, and Secretary of State for Work and Pensions. For political and public service.

=== Knights Commander of the Order of the British Empire (KBE) ===
- The Rt Hon Alister William Jack DL – Formerly Secretary of State for Scotland. For political and public service.
