= National Farmers' Union of England and Wales =

Farming employer association and trade association in England and Wales

National Farmers' Union
- Abbreviation: NFU
- Predecessor: Lincolnshire Farmers' Union
- Founded: 1908; 118 years ago
- Type: Employer association
- Headquarters: Agriculture House, Stoneleigh Park, Stoneleigh, Warwickshire, England, CV8 2TZ
- Location(s): England and Wales
- Members: 45,000 farming and growing businesses
- President: Tom Bradshaw
- Deputy President: Paul Tompkins
- Vice President: Robyn Munt
- Director General: Sophie Throup
- Affiliations: NFU Mutual Insurance Sister organisations: National Farmers' Union of Scotland; Ulster Farmers' Union
- Website: Official website

The National Farmers' Union of England and Wales (NFU) is an employer association representing farming and growing businesses within England and Wales.

The NFU originated as the Lincolnshire Farmers' Union (LFU) which was founded in 1904. Over the next four years, similar farmers' organisations were established in neighbouring counties. In 1908, these organisations formed the current National Farmers' Union. Colin Campbell was its first president.

The organisation has been led by Tom Bradshaw as president since 2024.

== History ==
=== Background tensions ===
The late 19th century coincided with increased struggle between three main groups:

- farmworkers, those farming on land on which they had no control over;
- tenant farmers, those renting the land to farm; and
- landowners, those owning the agricultural land.

The rise of the labour movement saw farmworkers organise agricultural trade unions such as the Lincolnshire Labour League (Note: Later known as the Amalgamated Labour League) and the Warwickshire Agricultural Labourers Union. (Note: Known later as the National Agricultural Labourers Union) These unions initially achieved modest victories and growth, but a series of unsuccessful attempts to use collective action resulted in the decline and dissolution of early farmworkers' unions.

In response to the victory of the Liberal Party in the 1906 UK general election, many farm owners took revenge against farmers suspected of radical views or of Liberal sympathies. On 20 July 1906, the Eastern Counties Agricultural Labourers & Small Holders Union (Note: Also known as: National Agricultural Labourers and Rural Workers Union (1910–1920), National Union of Agricultural Workers (1920–1968)) was formed in an attempt to combat these retributions, and further renew unionisation efforts among farmworkers.

Further angered in their opposition to potential land reform by the Liberal government, the Central Land Association (Note: Later known as the Central Landowners’ Association (1918–1949), then as the Country Landowners’ Association, (1949–unclear), and now known as the Country Land and Business Association.) (CLA) was formed to represent landlords' interests against their farmers, and against the Liberal government.

=== Formation and growth ===
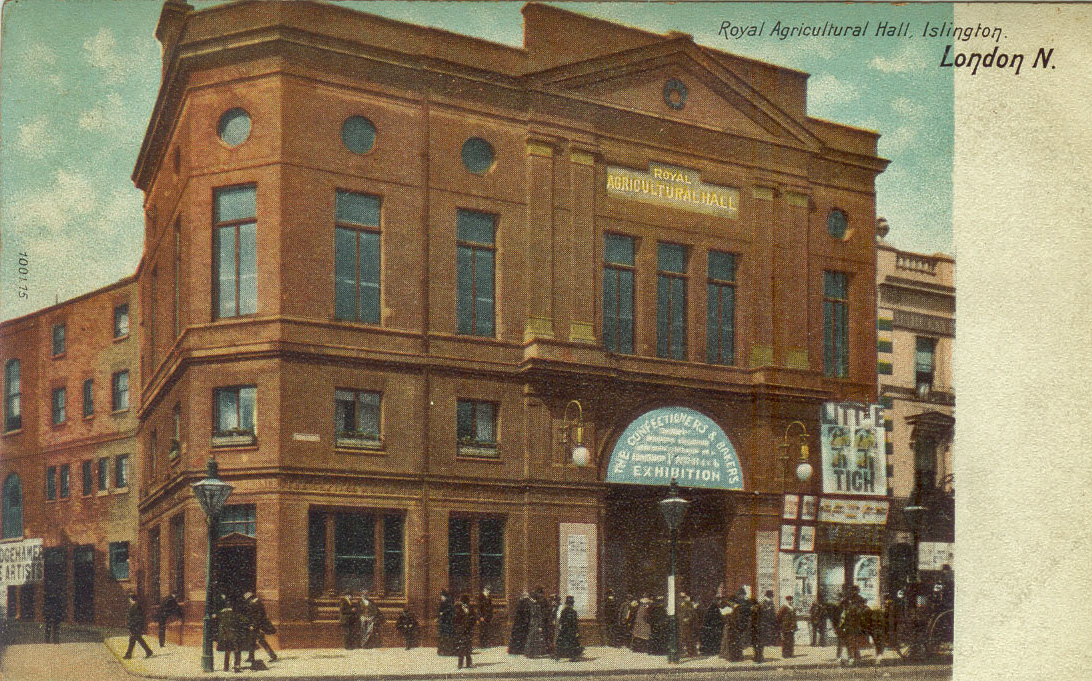
A 1900s postcard of the Agricultural Hall, where the Smithfield Show was held when the NFU was formed in 1908

In 1904, the Lincolnshire Farmers' Union (LFU) was founded to represent tenant farmers, in part against both increasingly unionised farmworkers, and against landlords.

On 10 December 1908, a meeting was held at the Smithfield Show to discuss the formation of a national organisation formed from the LFU. The meeting resulted in the formation of the National Farmers' Union. By 1913, it had 20,000 members—a majority being tenant-farmers—and excluded landowners but allowed owner-occupying farmers.

The NFU's first president, Colin Campbell, worked to get new branches off the ground, encourage membership and establish the NFU's credibility with government, at a time when farming was going through the longest and deepest depression in its history, as imports of cheap grain and frozen meat flooded in from abroad.

The NFU stood six candidates in the 1918 general election, none of whom were elected. In the 1922 general election, it stood three unsuccessful NFU candidates under its own name, and sponsored four successful Conservative Party candidates. It again sponsored Conservative candidates in 1923 and 1935 elections, but has not done so since.

Campbell was succeeded as NFU President in 1921 by Richard Robbins, an employers' representative on the Agricultural Wages Board.

On 3 December 1955, 12 Welsh members of the NFU left and formed the rival Farmers' Union of Wales. Verley Merchant, the NFU's Welsh Secretary, responded to the formation by saying "We will smash you in three months".

=== Recent history ===
In 1972, the NFU, alongside other farming employers' associations, set up the British Agriculture Bureau to represent their interests in the European Economic Community and later the European Union.

In 2000, with the National Farmers' Union of Scotland, the Ulster Farmers' Union, and other farming and food organisations, the NFU founded the Assured Food Standards company which administers the Red Tractor food quality mark.

In 2003, Ben Gill stood down as NFU president. Deputy president Tim Bennett and Derek Mead—a founding member of Farmers for Action (FFA) and an NFU Council member—stood as candidates, and Bennett was successful. In late 2005, Mead and Farmers for Action chairman David Handley established the pressure group Better NFU over what they saw as failures of the NFU's leadership. Better NFU also received support from Zac Goldsmith and Robin Page. Following the pressure groups' formation, Handley announced he would challenge sitting NFU president Tim Bennett for the position. Handley said he wished to see the NFU be more proactive and democratic, while his opponents feared he would turn the NFU into a larger version of the FFA. Deputy president Peter Kendall also announced his candidacy and went on to win the 2006 leadership contest. Handley would later describe Kendall as more collaborative than prior NFU presidents.

As a part of the UK quango reforms by the Cameron–Clegg government, in April 2013 the government prepared to abolish the Agricultural Wages Board—the body which had been responsible for regulating farm workers' wages. As pressure grew to maintain the board, the NFU lobbied in support of abolishing it. Abolition was completed later in 2013. In the same year, the NFU campaigned against the imposition of any cap on subsidies that farmers could receive.

In 2016, the Ethical Consumer Research Association published a report Understanding the NFU – an English Agribusiness Lobby Group. The report described the NFU as promoting policies that benefitted big agribusinesses at the expense of farm workers' pay and conditions, the environment, and animal welfare.

During the Brexit referendum, the NFU Council voted overwhelmingly to endorse the Remain campaign, but did not actively campaign on the issue. In the lead-up to the referendum, the NFU commissioned a report by Wageningen University which found that two of three Brexit scenarios could increase farm-gate prices.

In 2018, the NFU Council elected Minette Batters, deputy president of the NFU since 2014, as the NFU's president. She defeated the only other candidate, Guy Smith, who became her deputy. She stepped down as president in February 2024 and was succeeded by Tom Bradshaw without any challengers.

In the October 2024 budget, the Labour government announced reforms to inheritance tax which revoke the exemptions for agricultural estates. From April 2026, these estates would be taxed at 20% (half the standard rate) but the first £1 million of the property value will continue to be exempt. The NFU opposed the reforms, and responded by organising a protest in London.

In 2025 NFU held an AgriFutures Diversity Conference at STEAM house in Birmingham to promote inclusivity in agriculture.

In May 2025, Terry Jones announced he would step down as director general at the end of April 2026, after ten years in the post. Sophie Throup took up the role in the following month.

The archives of the NFU are deposited with the Rural History Centre at Reading University.

== Structure and function ==
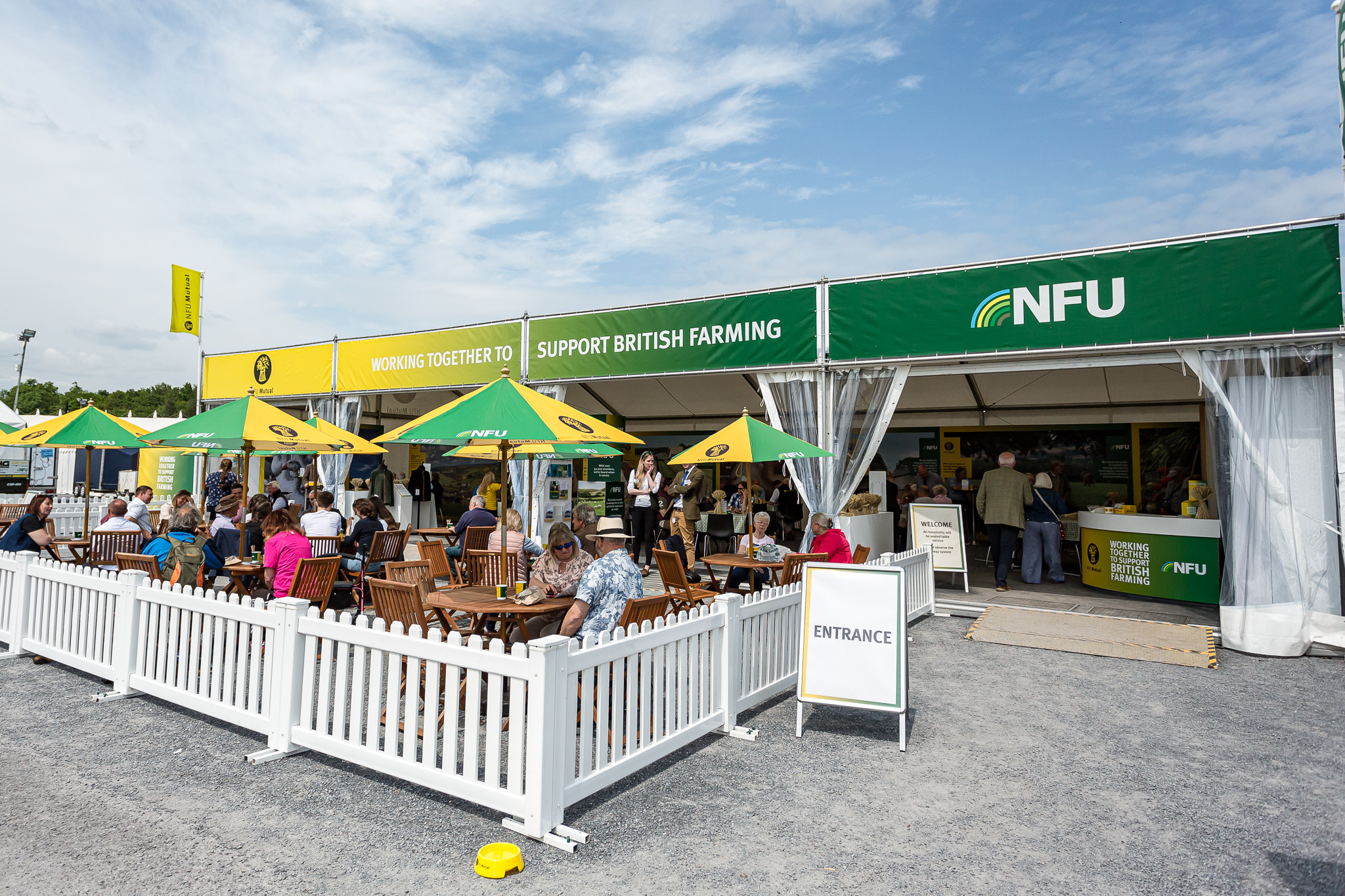
Shared NFU and NFU Mutual stand at the Devon County Show

The NFU is registered as an employer association with the Certification Office for Trade Unions and Employers' Associations. Despite potential confusion due to "Union" being in the NFU's name, it is not a trade union.

The NFU is governed by its constitution and rules, which state that the NFU shall maintain a number of bodies which are responsible for the governance of the NFU. These include the NFU Council, Governance Board, Policy Board, National Commodity Boards, Regional Commodity Boards, an Audit and Remuneration Committee and Legal Board and Regional Boards.

The NFU is led by its president (currently Tom Bradshaw since 2024). The position is elected by the 92 member NFU Council, the NFU's governing body.

The NFU is closely associated with the insurance company NFU Mutual.

Prior to its abolition in 2013, the National Farmers' Union nominated eight employers' representatives to the Agricultural Wages Board of England and Wales.

=== NFU Cymru ===
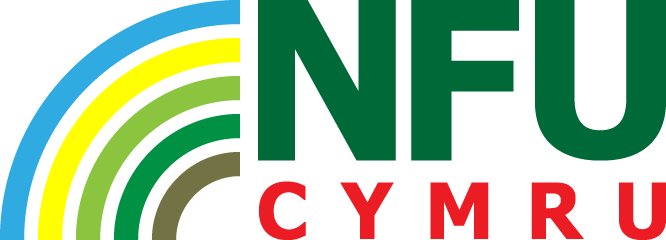
NFU Cymru logo

NFU Cymru is the constituent Welsh branch of the NFU. It was formed in 1999 in response to Welsh devolution and the formation of the Welsh Senedd. As of 2026, the president is Abi Reader.

NFU Cymru is based at the Royal Welsh Showground in Builth Wells.

NFU Cyrmu nominates one of the two employers' representatives on the seven-member Agricultural Advisory Panel for Wales.

=== British Agriculture Bureau ===
The British Agriculture Bureau (BAB) is the joint office of the NFU, the National Farmers' Union of Scotland and Ulster Farmers' Union in Brussels. The BAB lobbies for the British farming industry in regards to European Union policy.

== Presidents ==
List of presidents of the NFU since 1945:

- 1945: James Turner
- 1960: Miles Thomas
- 1960: Harold Woolley
- 1966: Gwilym Williams
- 1970: Henry Plumb
- 1979: Richard Butler
- 1986: Simon Gourlay
- 1991: David Naish
- 1998: Ben Gill
- 2004: Tim Bennett
- 2006: Peter Kendall
- 2014: Meurig Raymond
- 2018: Minette Batters
- 2024: Tom Bradshaw

== Election results ==
1918 general election
| Constituency | Candidate | Votes | % | Position |
|---|---|---|---|---|
| Barnard Castle | Octavius Monkhouse | 1,274 | 10.0 | 4 |
| East Norfolk | William Benjamin Taylor | 1,926 | 12.3 | 3 |
| Hertford | Edmund Broughton Barnard | 7,158 | 38.8 | 2 |
| Leominster | Ernest Wilfred Langford | 2,870 | 17.4 | 3 |
| Ormskirk | Stephen Hirst | 4,989 | 28.3 | 3 |
| Richmond (Yorkshire) | William Parlour | 4,907 | 33.2 | 2 |

Barnard was also sponsored by the National Party.

1922 general election
| Constituency | Candidate | Votes | % | Position |
|---|---|---|---|---|
| Carmarthen | Daniel Johns | 4,775 | 15.9 | 3 |
| Howdenshire | H. J. Winn | 7,021 | 39.5 | 2 |
| Leominster | Ernest Shepperson | 10,798 | 53.1 | 1 |
| Ormskirk | Francis Blundell | 11,921 | 58.7 | 1 |
| Rutland and Stamford | E. Clark | 4,471 | 20.3 | 3 |
| Stone | Joseph Lamb | 7,742 | 38.3 | 1 |
| Wells | Robert Bruford | 10,210 | 47.7 | 1 |

Blundell, Bruford, Lamb and Shepperson stood for the Conservative Party.

1923 general election
| Constituency | Candidate | Votes | % | Position |
|---|---|---|---|---|
| Leominster | Ernest Shepperson | 11,582 | 57.3 | 1 |
| Ormskirk | Francis Blundell | 10,598 | 53.0 | 1 |
| Stone | Joseph Lamb | 10,001 | 50.8 | 1 |
| Wells | Robert Bruford | 9,909 | 44.2 | 2 |

All candidates stood for the Conservative Party.

1924 general election
| Constituency | Candidate | Votes | % | Position |
|---|---|---|---|---|
| Leominster | Ernest Shepperson | 13,237 | 52.5 | 1 |
| Stone | Joseph Lamb | 12,856 | 57.3 | 1 |

Both candidates stood for the Conservative Party.

in the 1935 general election, two candidates were sponsored and elected for the Conservative Party.

== Arms ==
Coat of arms of National Farmers' Union of England and Wales
| Notes Granted 9 September 1946 Crest On a wreath of the colours a scythe and sceptre in saltire Or. Escutcheon Vert a chevron Ermine between in dexter chief a hull's head and in sinister chief a ram's head caboshed and in base three ears of wheat banded all Or. |

== See also ==
- Agriculture in the United Kingdom
- National Farmers' Union of Scotland – Scottish sister organisation
- Ulster Farmers' Union – Northern Irish sister organisation
- Farmers' Union of Wales – Rival organisation in Wales
- Unite the Union (Food, Drink and Agricultural Section) – represents farmworkers in the UK and Ireland
