= Delamere Dairy =

British dairy company

- Company type: Ltd.
- Industry: Food processing
- Founded: Cheshire, United Kingdom (1985; 41 years ago)
- Founders: Roger and Liz Sutton
- Headquarters: Knutsford, United Kingdom
- Products: Dairy products
- Website: delameredairy.co.uk

Delamere Dairy is a UK-based company founded in 1985, producing goat milk and other dairy products such as cheeses and yoghurts, sold in supermarkets and other outlets nationally as well as in Ireland, Italy, China, Hong Kong, Singapore, Thailand, Middle East and Caribbean. Delamere Dairy is a member of a British Cheese Board.

== History ==
Delamere Dairy was founded with the purchase of three goats by Liz and Roger Sutton in Delamere Forest in 1985.

Delamere Dairy works with goat farms across the UK, and co-packers across the UK and Europe making products to the company’s specifications. Products are sold in both the Delamere brand and supermarket-owned labels by retailers and wholesalers throughout the UK. Delamere Dairy currently sells its products in 17 markets overseas.

In 2011 Delamere opened its first overseas office in Hong Kong and was one of the first UK businesses with permission to export goat milk into the Chinese market.

== Products ==
Goat milk is Delamere's primary product. They produce a whole, semi-skimmed, and skimmed version of goat milk as an alternative to cow milk. Goat milk has become popular with consumers who have an intolerance to cow milk.

Delamere's products include goat cheeses, yoghurts, and butter. The goat milk is also available as UHT milk.

Delamere launched a goat milk product for pets under the brand 'Toplife Formula'.

== Animal abuse ==
In July 2022 an article published in The Independent alleged a supplier to Delamere Dairy was subjecting goats to "violence and neglect". Undercover footage showed lame goats struggling to access food and water points, animals in so much pain they were unable to walk properly, and piles of dead goats rotting outside of sheds. A spokesman for the RSPCA said "this footage is distressing to see and raises some serious concerns regarding the treatment of these goats", however Delamere Dairy denied there had been any breaches in animal welfare.

== Awards ==
In 2011, Delamere received the 'Farm Business of the Year' award at the Farm Business Food & Farming Industry Awards.

In 2015, the farm won the 'Exporter of The Year' award at the Food and Drink Federation Awards gala.

In 2016, the company was awarded the Queen's Award for Enterprise for its international trade achievements.
