= Harold Woolley, Baron Woolley =

British politician and farmer

Harold Woolley, Baron Woolley, CBE (6 February 1905 – 31 July 1986) was a British farmer and life peer who served as the President of the National Farmers' Union between 1960 and 1966.

== Life and career ==
Woolley was the son of William Woolley, JP and Eleanor Woolley, and was educated at the Woodhouse Grove School. A leading Cheshire farmer, he was elected as the Cheshire delegate to the National Farmers' Union in 1943, before chairing the NFU Parliamentary Committee between 1947 and 1957. He then served as the NUS' vice president and deputy president on several occasions, before serving as its president between 1960 and 1966.

Woolley was appointed Commander of the Order of the British Empire in the 1958 Birthday Honours and was made a Knight Bachelor in 1964 Birthday Honours "for services to farming". On 18 January 1967, Woolley was created a life peer as Baron Woolley, of Hatton in the County Palatine of Chester. In the House of Lords he sat as a crossbencher. He was appointed a Deputy Lieutenant of Cheshire in 1969.

== Family ==
Woolley married Martha Annie Jeffs, with whom he had four sons, in 1926; she died in 1936. He then married Hazel Eileen Archer Jones, with whom he had two daughters, in 1937. Lady Woolley died in 1975.
