= Ulster Farmers' Union =

Organization

- Formation: 1918
- Location: Northern Ireland
- Members: 12,500 members
- President: John McLenaghan
- Deputy President: Glenn Cuddy
- Deputy President: Clement Lynch
- Website: Official website

The Ulster Farmers Union (UFU) is a member organisation/industry association for farmers in Northern Ireland. The UFU was formed in 1918 and currently claims over 12,500 members.

== Presidency ==
Previous Presidents of the UFU included Sir Basil Brooke, later the Prime Minister of Northern Ireland, who served as UFU President between 1930 and 1931, as well as Rev. Robert Moore (1937–38, 1939–40 and 1941–42), Harry West (1955–56) and John Gilliland (2002–04), who was a cross-community candidate in the 2004 European Parliament election. Harry Sinclair from Draperstown, County Londonderry, was president between 2012 and 2014. The current President is John McLenaghan from County Londonderry.

== Campaigns ==
The UFU has been involved in a number of campaigns for farmers' rights in Northern Ireland, including opposing moves to introduce compulsory purchases of farmland for industrial purposes, organising a protest over low produce prices and campaigning for an exemption for beef export bans during the Bovine spongiform encephalopathy crises.

== See also ==
- Agriculture in the United Kingdom
- Economy of Northern Ireland
- National Farmers' Union of England and Wales
- National Farmers' Union of Scotland
