= Sugarwise =

UK certification authority for sugar claims on food and drink

- Formation: 2016
- Founder: Rend Platings
- Type: Certification body
- Headquarters: Cambridge
- Region served: England
- Fields: Nutrition, Health
- Website: sugarwise.org

Sugarwise is the international certification authority for sugar claims on food and drink. It assesses foods and beverages on the basis of their sugar claims.

The authority certifies and allows use of its logo on products with no more than 5g of free sugars in 100g in a food or 2.5g of free sugars in 100ml in a beverage, that can also carry a sugar claim. The low free sugar standard is derived from the World Health Organization guidelines for daily intake of free sugars.

== The Sugarwise Test ==
The Sugarwise test distinguishes between free sugars and intrinsic sugars in a food or drink product for the first time and was developed by Cambridge University Scientists.

Sugarwise adheres to the WHO guidelines on free sugar content: "Free sugars include monosaccharides and disaccharides added to foods and beverages by the manufacturer, cook or consumer, and sugars naturally present in honey, syrups, fruit juices and fruit juice concentrates."

== Policy and Public Affairs ==
=== #DontTaxHealthy ===
Sugarwise was one of the two organisations behind the #DontTaxHealthy campaign to cut VAT on healthy food and continues to lobby for tax breaks on low sugar food and drink.

=== Parliamentary Engagement ===
Sugarwise has held Summits at the UK Houses of Parliament, chaired by Keith Vaz in his capacity as Chair of the APPG for Diabetes, in a bid to promote lower-sugar food and drink and help tackle the growing threat of obesity and diabetes. Sugarwise's Patron is Lord Clive Brooke, Baron Brooke of Alverthorpe.

A Summit at the European parliament was convened in September 2017 supported by Alex Mayer. This called for tariffs to be removed for healthier food and drink across the EU post Brexit And was followed by a third summit at the UK Houses of Parliament on 13 September 2017.

== History ==
Sugarwise was launched in March 2016 with the assistance of Enterprise Europe Network. Mother-of-one Rend Platings founded the organisation after hearing England's chief medical officer's revelation that, as a result of obesity, today's generation of parents may be the first to outlive their children.

The Sugarwise logo was developed by design firm Pemberton & Whitefoord (P&W) with the support of Tesco.

The first product to be certified was JimJams reduced-sugar chocolate spread.

In July 2017 Sugarwise certified "Sugar Free" recipes magazine sold in UK supermarkets.
