= Pinkerton =

Pinkerton or Pinkerton's may refer to:

- Pinkerton (detective agency), founded in 1850 by Allan Pinkerton
- Pinkerton (album), a 1996 album by Weezer

== Places ==
- Pinkerton, Ontario, Canada, an unincorporated community
- Pinkerton Run, Pennsylvania, United States, a stream
- Pinkerton's Landing Bridge, a railroad bridge in Pennsylvania across the Monongahela River

== People ==
- Al Pinkerton (fl. 2024–present), British politician and academic
- Allan Pinkerton (1819–1884), Scottish-American detective and spy, founder of what would become the Pinkerton National Detective Agency
- Bill Pinkerton (born 1932), Scottish football goalkeeper
- Brian Pinkerton (fl. 2004–present), American fiction author
- David Pinkerton (1836–1906), New Zealand politician
- Godfrey Pinkerton (1858–1937), British architect
- Henry Pinkerton (1915–1986), Scottish footballer
- James Pinkerton (born 1958), American columnist, author and political analyst
- Jay Pinkerton (born 1977), Canadian humorist
- John Pinkerton (1758–1826), Scottish antiquarian, cartographer, author, numismatist and historian
- John Pinkerton (politician) (1845–1908), Irish politician and Member of Parliament
- John Pinkerton (computer designer) (1919–1997), British computer designer
- Kathrene Pinkerton (1887–1967), American writer
- Louis Pinkerton (fl. 2007–present), American politician
- Mike Pinkerton (fl. 1997–present), American software engineer
- Nancy Pinkerton (1940–2010), American actress
- Percy Edward Pinkerton (1855–1946), English translator and poet
- Peter Pinkerton (1870–1930), Scottish mathematician
- Robert Pinkerton (1780–1859), Scottish missionary, linguist, translator and author
- Romeo Pinkerton (born c. 1958), American mass murderer
- Stuart Pinkerton (born 1973), Australian former rugby union player
- William Pinkerton (1810–1893), early South Australian settler
- Pinkerton R. Vaughn (1841–1866), American Civil War Marine Corps sergeant awarded the Medal of Honor

== Arts and entertainment ==
=== Fictional characters ===
- Pinky Pinkerton, a Marvel Comics character
- Lieutenant Pinkerton, in Puccini's opera Madama Butterfly

=== Other uses in arts and entertainment ===
- The Pinkertons, a Canadian Western television series

== See also ==
- Pinkerton Academy, a high school in Derry, New Hampshire
- Pinkerton Lecture, an annual lecture named after computer designer John Pinkerton
- Pinkerton syndrome, the perceived tendency of some Asians to regard white people as superior or more desirable
- Pinkerton v. United States, 328 U.S. 640 (1946), a U.S. Supreme Court case
