= Flora E. Lowry =

American anthologist and clubwoman (1879–1933)

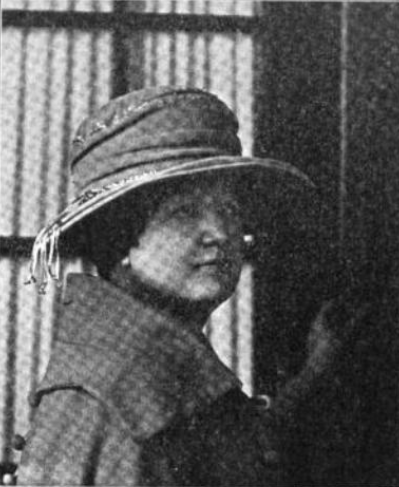
- Born: Flora E. Wood; September 14, 1879 near Hancock, Wisconsin, U.S.
- Died: April 21, 1933 (aged 53); La Crosse, Wisconsin, U.S.
- Occupation: Anthologist
- Spouse: Robert B. Lowry (m. 1906; died 1931)
- Writing career
- Language: English

Flora E. Lowry (née, Woods; September 14, 1879 – April 21, 1933) was an American anthologist from Wisconsin, affiliated with the American Literary Association. In the early 1900s, she collected and catalogued the work of authors from the state. Lowry possessed what was perhaps the most complete private collection of books by Wisconsin writers and of data concerning Wisconsin authors in the state. Her activism led her to establish, design, and execute the "Hall of Fame for Wisconsin Authors".

Lowry's career began as a teacher, before she became a prodigious writer, mostly of poetry. She was also a club woman who lectured at women's clubs and literary societies on the literature of Wisconsin, bringing along exhibits of books and publications published in the state.

== Early life and education ==
Flora E. Wood (or Woods) was born near Hancock, Wisconsin, September 14, 1879. Her father was B. S. Woods. There were at least thee siblings, including two sisters, Mrs. Archie Tyrrell and Mrs. A. Page, and a brother, Roy Woods. Her aunt was Sarah J. Wood.

Lowry was a student in the public schools of the town, and also of those in Nebraska. After returning to Hancock, she became a graduate of Stevens Point Normal School (now University of Wisconsin–Stevens Point) before studying at the University of Wisconsin.

== Career ==
Lowry taught in La Crosse, Wisconsin public schools for several years. There she met Robert B. Lowry, and they married on July 19, 1906. He went on to become a banker. The Lowrys had at least one child, a son.

She served as press reporter for the Alpha chapter, local branch of the Delphian Society.

=== Anthologist ===
Lowry collected and catalogued information and memorabilia related to Wisconsin's writers, and, to some extent, copies of books written by them. She also built up a personal acquaintance with scores of writers. Whenever Robert Lowry traveled, she planned carefully in order to meet and interview as many Wisconsin writers as possible. She sought to form a personal acquaintance with them and to get that first-hand intimate knowledge which a personal acquaintance alone will give. She knew writers from New York City to Los Angeles, and had a fund of experiences to relate of her interviews with them. Her collection of information on Wisconsin writers and their books was the most complete of its kind in the state and had few counterparts in private hands in the United States. It was an encyclopedia on the subject of Wisconsin's literary production, a private "Who's Who" in the realm of Wisconsin letters.

There were, of course, thousands of people in Wisconsin who were writing —text-book makers, editors and others- whose names were not included in her files. Lowry had four classifications of living authors: First, those born in Wisconsin and living and doing their work in the state. In this group were the names of Mabel Brown Denison, Zona Gale, Laura C. Kellogg, Louise Phelps Kellogg, Jessica Knowles, Johanna Weborg, Gertrude Sanborn, Rasmus B. Anderson, A. O. Barton, E. L. Eaton, John Faville, William A. Freehoff, George Grimm, Fred L. Holmes, Charles Phillipps, J. F. A. Pyre, A. H. Sanford, Joseph Schafer, H. George Schuette, Grant Showerman, and C. E. Whelan.

Second were writers born in Wisconsin but no longer residents of the state, such as Margaret Ashman, Flavia Camp Canfield, Emma P. Erskine Corwin, Elizabeth Jordan, Eleanor Mercein Kelly, Sister M. Madeleva, Jessica Nelson North, Marion Manville Pope, Faith V. Vilas, Edith Franklin Wyatt, Simon A. Blackmore, Berton Braley, Grant Hyde Code, Thomas Dreier, James W. Evans, Elmer E. Ferris, Hamlin Garland, Frederick Grant, John H. Hazelton, Richard Lloyd Jones, William J. McNally, Kirk Munroe, Louis Hermann Pammel, Frederick E. Pond, O. J. Schuster, Frederick Jackson Turner, Charles N. Webb, Honora Willsie, and James A. Peterson.

Third were writers born outside of Wisconsin who are now living in the state, such as Effie Alger Allen, Olympia W. Brown, Elizabeth Corbett, General Charles King, Aubertine Woodward Moore, Kate Ridedale, Lois Kimball Mathews Rosenberry, Gertrude Slaughter, Ellen Torelle, Waldemar Ager, Ole Amundsen Buslett, John N. Davidson, Edgar George Doudna, E. F. Hayward, William Stanislaus Hoffman, H. R. Holand, William F. Kirk, William Ellery Leonard, Verne S. Pease, Milo M. Qualfe, Leslie W. Quirk, Ditlef G. Ristad, Thomas Hall Shastid, Charles D. Stewart, George H. Willett, Charles H. Winke, and John Granville Woolley.

Fourth were writers not native to Wisconsin, who formerly lived here and did some of their work here, such as Elizabeth Baker Bohan, Elizabeth Banks, Edna Ferber, Ninette Lowater, Kathrene Pinkerton, Ray Stannard Baker, Howard Mumford Jones, and Frank H. Spearman.

Lowry also has a file of writers who are no longer living, including names which otherwise would have come under one or another of the groups mentioned, such as Amy Winshik Davis, Helen Adelia Manville, Elizabeth Mears, Helen Remington Olin, Frances E. Willard, Ella Wheeler Wilcox, James Whitford Bashford, John T. Durward, Henry Eduard Legler, John Muir, Bill Nye, George Wilbur Peck, James Gates Percival, Paul S. Reinsch, Eben E. Rexford, Carl Schurz, Lute A. Taylor, and Reuben Gold Thwaites.

The making of the collection of Wisconsin books and data on Wisconsin writers began as an interesting hobby with Lowry, but has then led to become much more than that. It has in fact, taken on a phase not without significance to others than herself. Lowry received an increasing number of calls from clubs throughout the state to speak on Wisconsin writers at conventions and meetings. On such occasions, she exhibited Wisconsin books, or books by Wisconsin people, magazines carrying Wisconsin authors, photographs of authors and other material which provided information about her work. The books were passed around among the guests during her talks and were thus made better known to many potential readers.

Many Wisconsin writers enjoyed visiting Lowry. She invited several of her guests to speak before local clubs, feeling that it was well for authors and readers to know each other face to face.

The books in Lowry's collection were as varied in character and pretensions as the authors they represented, some bulky and buckram-bound, others modest, thin, first editions. Most of them were autographed by the authors themselves and many of them were inscribed with some sentiment of regard or some quotation from the philosophy of the writers.

== Later life and death ==
Robert, who had become a bank vice-president, died December 31, 1931. The couple had faced marital problems but never filed for divorce. In his will, Robert left US$12,000 to his widow, and US$15,000 to his relatives, which Lowry sought to recover in court in 1932. The judge ruled in favor of the defendants.

In March 1933, she was elected recording secretary of the La Crosse Woman's Club. On April 21, 1933, Lowry committed suicide by gas, at her home in La Crosse, Wisconsin, leaving behind a note, which said in part,— "... so few of my dreams have come true".
