= Summerstown, London =

Coordinates: 51.431966°N 0.184568°W

Summerstown
- Location within Greater London
- London borough: Wandsworth; Merton
- Ceremonial county: Greater London
- Region: London
- Country: England
- Sovereign state: United Kingdom
- Post town: LONDON
- Postcode district: SW17
- Dialling code: 020
- Police: Metropolitan
- Fire: London
- Ambulance: London
- UK Parliament: Wimbledon and Tooting
- London Assembly: Merton and Wandsworth

Summerstown is a district of south-west London located on the boundary between the London Borough of Wandsworth and the London Borough of Merton. It is an area on the north eastern edge of Wimbledon, south of Earlsfield, west of Tooting and north of Colliers Wood. The district is bisected by the A217 and bordered by the River Wandle.

== History ==
Evidence of settlement in the area of Summerstown first appears in the late Middle Ages, when the River Wandle was bordered by mills in this area, worked by villagers from the nearby hamlet of Garratt (which gives its name to 'Garratt Lane', the local stretch of the A217). By 1631, ‘Dutchmen’ are recorded as manufacturing kettles and frying pans here, while other Huguenot refugees are thought to have engaged in silk weaving and wig making here.

By the mid-nineteenth century, this area was becoming increasingly populated, with many of the present day properties being built in the area at this time, notably the St Clement Danes almshouses in 1848–9, which have now become council housing.

The nineteenth century also saw the construction of Summerstown's parish church, with a chapel being built in 1836, and extended in 1861 and 1870. By 1903, it was apparent that a yet larger church was needed, so the present day St Mary's Church was constructed just off Garratt Lane, where it remains little altered to this day.

The early twentieth century was a turbulent time for the parish, with the Great War costing the lives of 182 men in the parish, who were memorialised by Summerstown's war memorial, which is located just inside St Mary's Church. In the Second World War, Summerstown was also affected by bombing, particularly in 1944, when a V2 rocket struck Hazelhurst Road, killing 35 and injuring over a hundred. After the war, this presented the council with the opportunity to construct the Hazelhurst estate in 1969–73.

Between 1961 and 1968, Marc Bolan (then known as Marc Feld) and family lived in Summerstown. He attended Hillcroft School (now Ernest Bevin Academy) and worked part time as a dish washer at the local Wimpy burger bar in Tooting. His time in Summerstown was difficult but formative, with Feld often busking outside the former Prince of Wales pub (now Tesco Express). In 2021, plans to erect a commemorative plaque to mark Bolan's time in the area were announced.

== Present Day ==
The parish church, St Mary's Church, is still open and active in the parish, hosting a service at 10:30 each Sunday morning, and holds a range of services include singing, prayers and a talks from the Bible as well as activities for children.

Community project Summerstown 182 identifies and raises awareness of local Summerstown history. Founded by Geoff Simmons, the project has been responsible for erecting plaques in honour of many former residents, including Sidney Lewis, Sadie Crawford and Peter Barr. Summerstown 182 was named one of Sadiq Khan's Community Heroes in 2015.

It is home to the By The Horns Brewing Co., which stands almost exactly on the site of Marc Bolan's former home. The brewers named an ale, Cosmic Warrior, after the late singer.

The area was also home to Wimbledon Stadium, a dog racing track that also hosted speedway, stock car and other racing events, which closed in 2017. The New Plough Lane Stadium, home of AFC Wimbledon, was built in its place and opened in November 2020.
