= Popoftchins =

The Popoftchins, or Popovshchins, is a name given to the different sects of Russian dissenters who recognised the validity of ordination as given in the Established Church, and received most of their popes, i.e. priests, from that communion.

== History ==
The Popoftchins were divided into five principal sects: the Starobertzi, or Old Ceremonialists, the Diaconoftschins, the Peremayanoftschins, the Epefanoftschins, and the Tschernaboltsi. Those who had no priests at all, or who did not acknowledge the validity of Church ordination, were termed Bez-Popoftchins, or No-Priesters.

=== Epefanoftschins ===
This sect took its name from a monk of Kiev, who, in 1724, by forged letters and recommendations, got himself ordained bishop by the Metropolitan of Jesse, and who, on this account, having been called to account by government, died in confinement at Kiev. Those who were attached to him held him to have been a legal bishop, and therefore looked upon him as a martyr, and visited his tomb in that city. They were never numerous; and though they had some trifling peculiarities, were nearly the same with the Starobredsi, or Old Ceremonialists of Staradubofsk.

== Sources ==
- Pinkerton, Robert (1814). The Present State of the Greek Church in Russia. [Translated from the Slavonian of Platon Levshin]. Edinburgh: Oliphant, Waugh & Innes. p. 304.
- McClintock, John; Strong, James (1879). "Popoftchins, Popovshchins". Cyclopædia of Biblical, Theological, and Ecclesiastical Literature. Vol. VIII.—Pet–Re. New York: Harper & Brothers. p. 416.
