= Otford to Shoreham Downs =

Protected area in England

Coordinates: 51.335°N 0.199°E

- Site of Special Scientific Interest
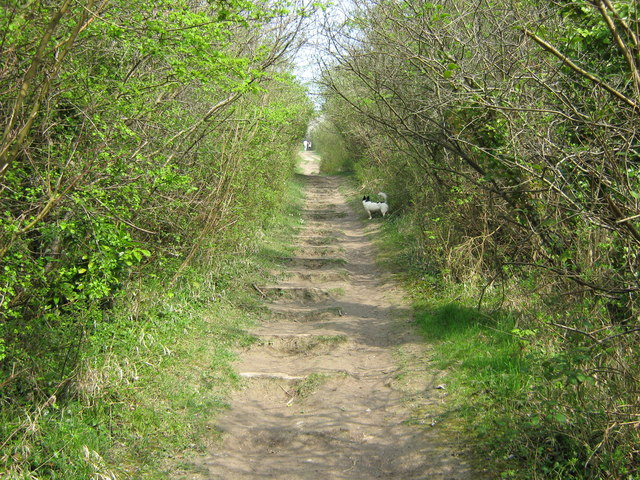
- Location of Otford to Shoreham Downs.
- Area of search: Kent
- Grid reference: TQ 533 618
- Interest: Biological
- Area: 145.1 hectares (359 acres)
- Notification date: 1991
- Location map: Magic Map

Otford to Shoreham Downs is a 145.1-hectare (359-acre) biological Site of Special Scientific Interest between Kemsing and Eynesford in Kent, England. It is part of Kent Downs Area of Outstanding Natural Beauty and part it is Fackenden Down, a nature reserve managed by the Kent Wildlife Trust

These downs have woodland, scrub and species-rich chalk grassland, which has been traditionally managed by grazing. A decline in grazing has caused the chalk downland to become overgrown, but it is still very species diverse, with over a hundred plants recorded.
