= St Mary's Church, Summerstown =

St Mary’s Church, Summerstown
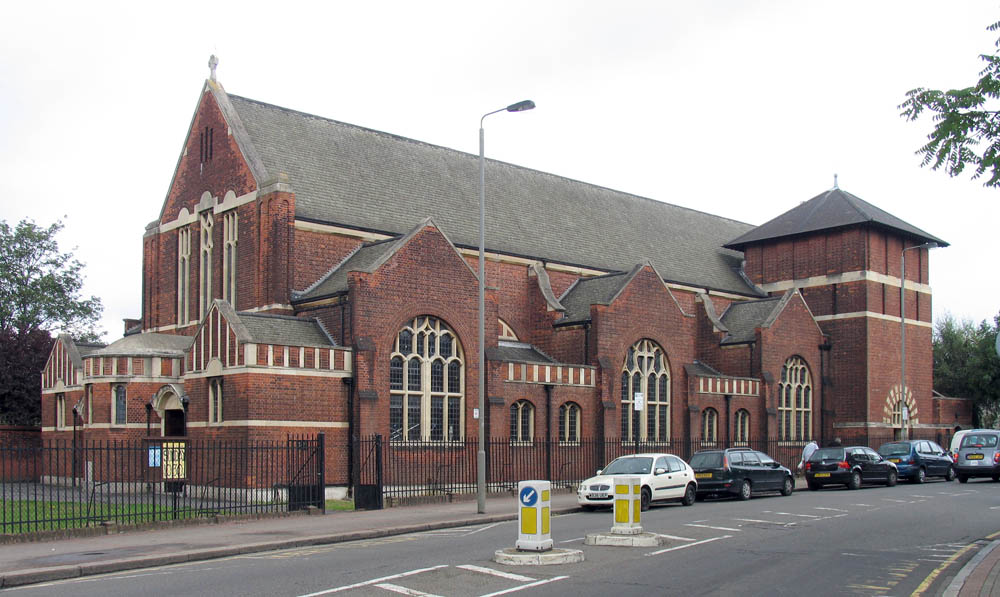
- St Mary’s Church, Summerstown

- Location within London
- 51°25′56″N 0°10′59″W
- Location: Summerstown, London
- Country: England
- Denomination: Church of England

History
- Consecrated: 30 April 1904

Architecture
- Heritage designation: Grade II listed
- Architect: Godfrey Pinkerton
- Groundbreaking: 4 April 1903
- Construction cost: £10,846 (equivalent to £1,140,200 in 2025)

Specifications
- Capacity: 800 persons

Administration
- Diocese: Southwark
- Archdeaconry: Wandsworth
- Deanery: Tooting
- Parish: St, Mary, Summer Town

St Mary's Church, Summerstown, is the parish church of Summerstown, South London. It is also a Grade II listed building, having been designed by Godfrey Pinkerton and constructed in 1903–4.

== History ==
Saint Mary, Summerstown Act 1968
- Act of Parliament
- Parliament of the United Kingdom
- Long title: An Act to authorise the sale of the site of the former church of Saint Mary, Summerstown in the London borough of Wandsworth; to free the said land from the restrictions attaching to it as a site of a church; and for other purposes.
- Citation: 1968 c. v

Dates
- Royal assent: 8 May 1968

Text of statute as originally enacted

The parish was constituted in 1845 and there has been a church in this area for a number of years. In 1894, the old chapel, built in 1836 by William Moseley and extended in 1861 and 1870, was demolished for structural reasons, and was replaced by a temporary iron structure until a new parish church could be completed nearby. This iron structure served as a church hall from c. 1925 until 1968, when it was sold by an act of Parliament, the Saint Mary, Summerstown Act 1968 (c. v).

The Incorporated Society for Promoting the Enlargement, Building and repairing of Churches and Chapels gave £250 towards the rebuilding. The foundation stone was laid by Princess Helena, daughter of Queen Victoria on 4 April 1903 who was accompanied by an escort of the Surrey Imperial Yeomanry, and greeted at the site by a detachment of the 4th Surrey Volunteers. The Mayor of the Metropolitan Borough of Wandsworth, Mr Henry Kimber MP and the vicar, Revd. John Robinson were in attendance.

The church was consecrated by the Suffragan Bishop of Southwark, Huyshe Yeatman-Biggs, on Saturday 30 April 1904.

It has been little altered over the years, with an addition of a new church hall around 1968, a (recently restored) lynch gate around 1930, and Summerstown's war memorial after the Great War.

== Organ ==
The church contains a pipe organ by Henry Bevington. A specification of the organ can be found on the National Pipe Organ Register.

== Present Day ==
The church is open for public services every Sunday at 10:30am, and has a range of mid-week groups, including for children, students and young adults.
