= By the Horns Brewing Co. =

British microbrewery based in Summerstown, London

Coordinates: 51.432716°N 0.184900°W

By The Horns Brewing Co
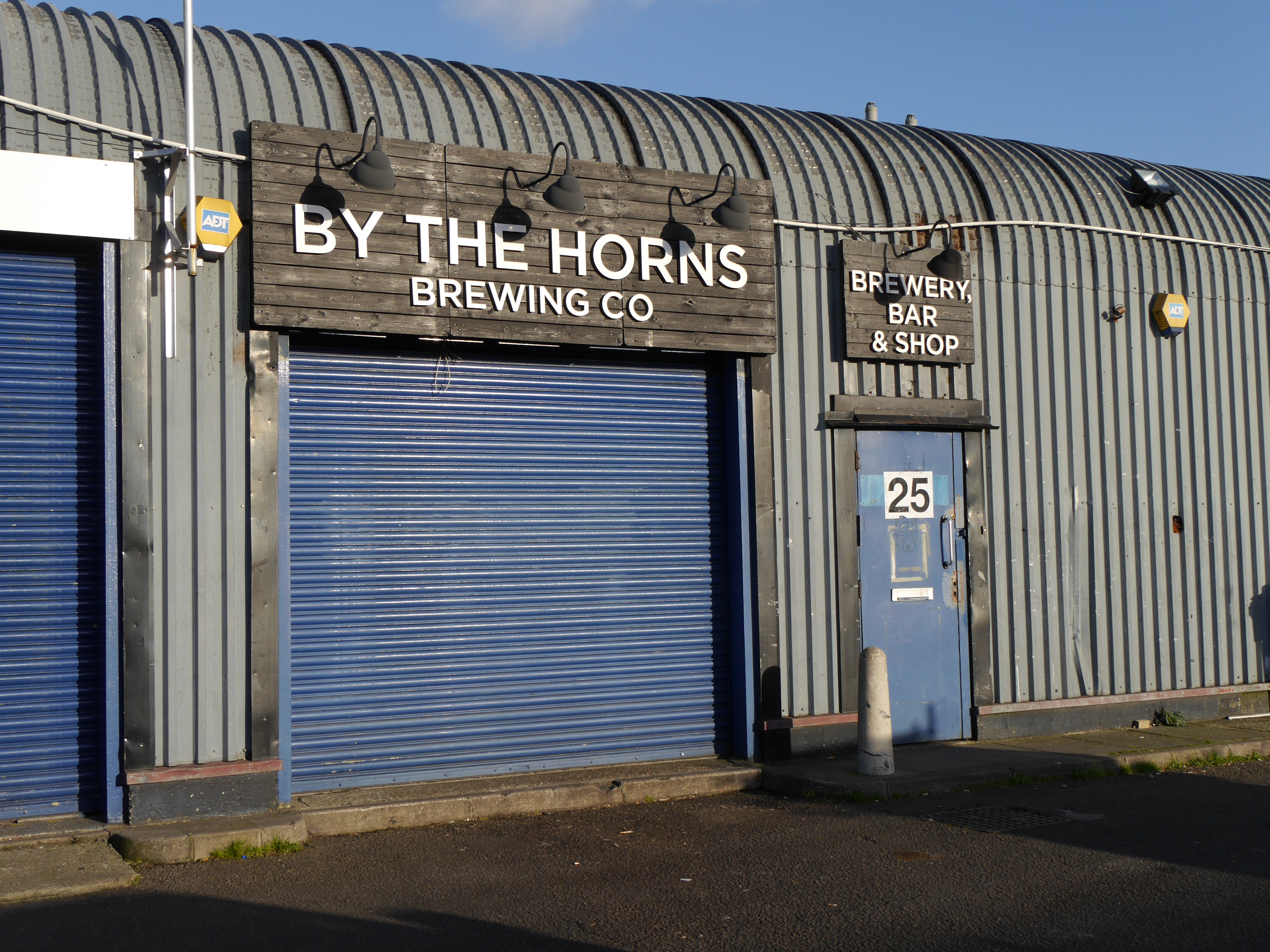
- Exterior of By The Horns, Summerstown, London
- Company type: Brewery
- Industry: Alcoholic beverage
- Headquarters: Summerstown; London, SW17; United Kingdom
- Products: Beer
- Website: bythehorns.co.uk

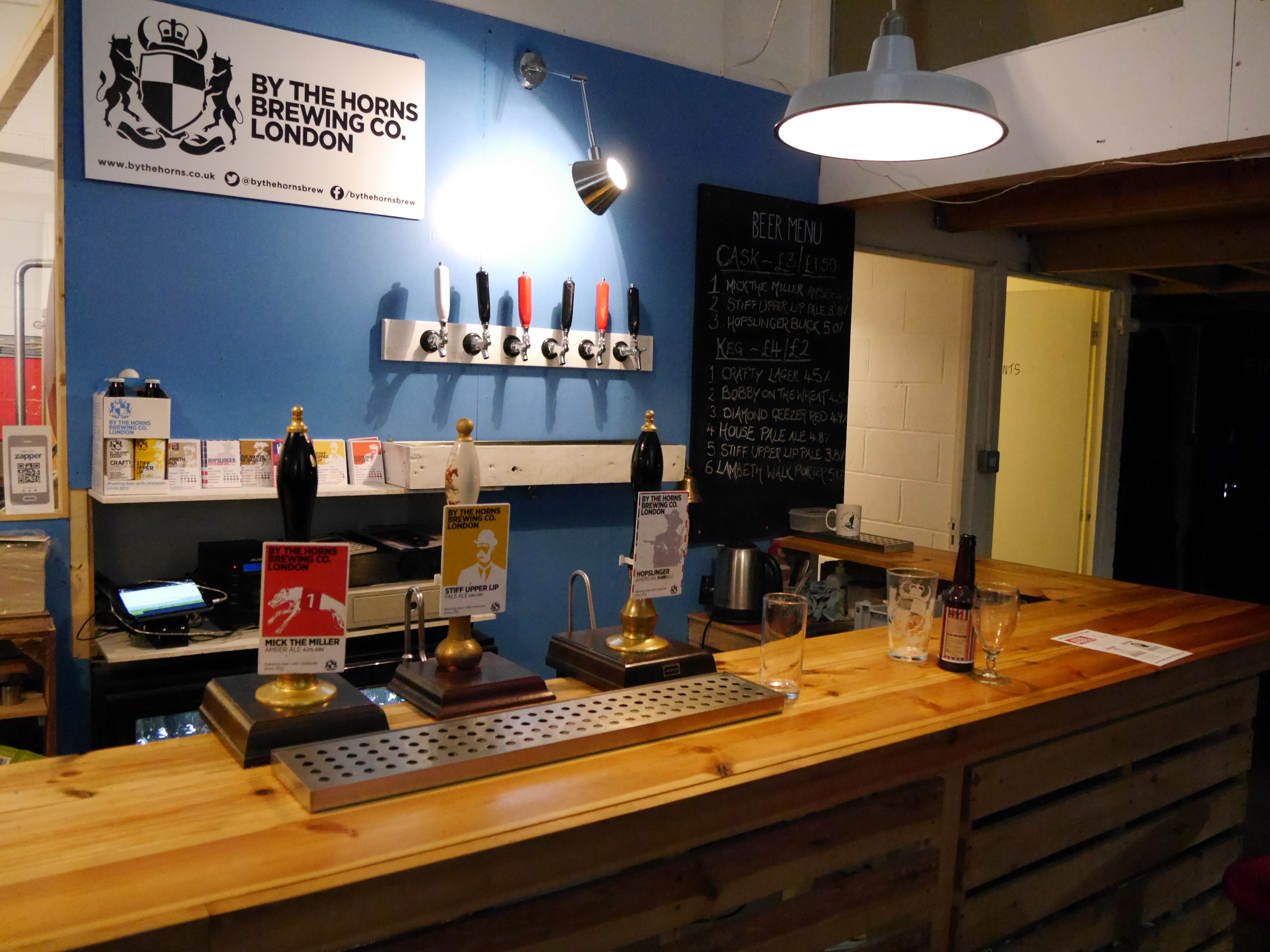
Brewery taps

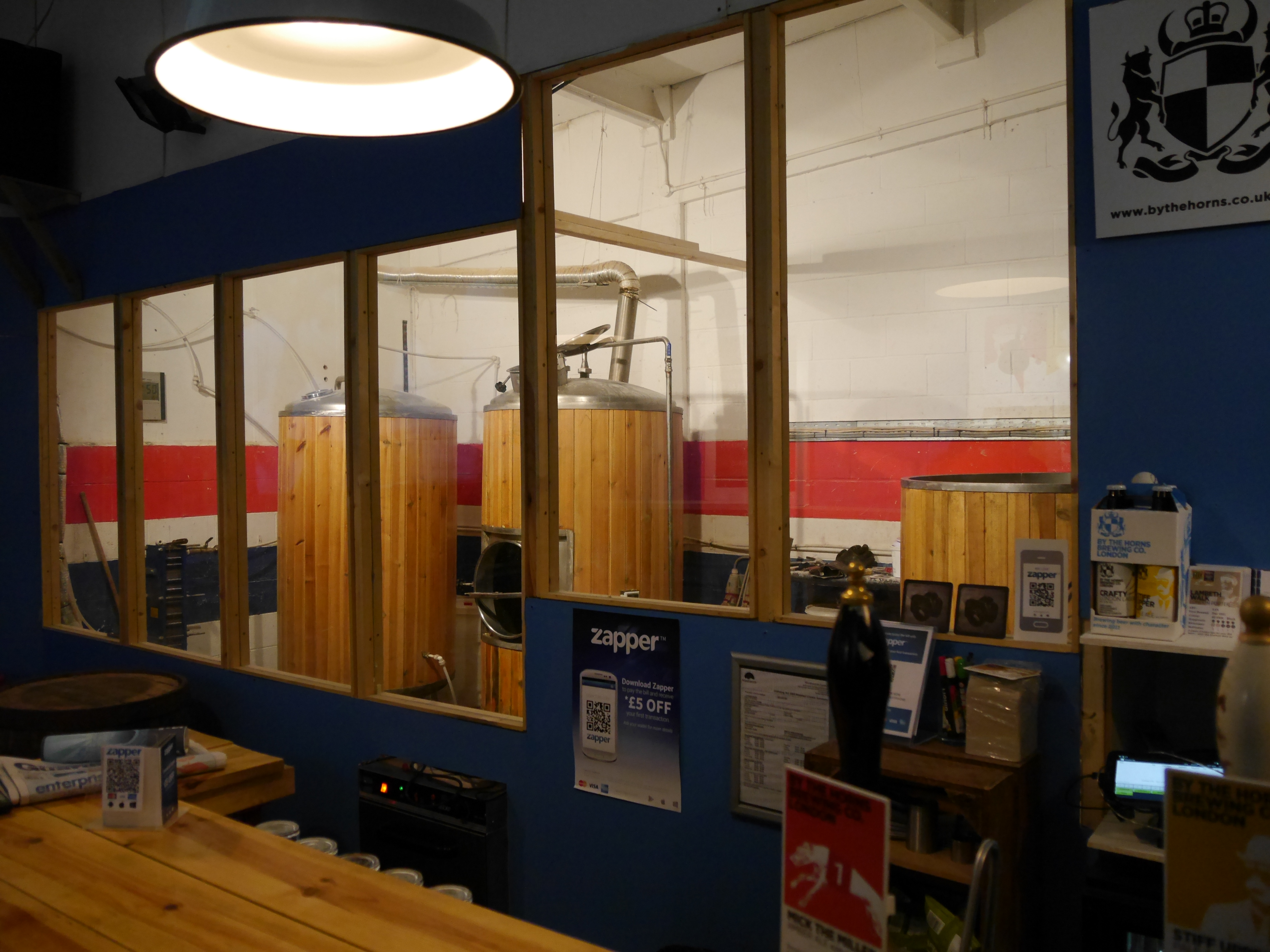
Brewing kit

By The Horns Brewing Co was a British microbrewery based in Salfords, Redhill and founded by Alex Bull and Chris Mills. It was originally based in Summerstown, London, with a brewery tap bar and bottle shop at the same address. They entered liquidation on 3 February 2025.

== Flagship beers ==
- Stiff Upper Lip
- Diamond Geezer
- Lambeth Walk
- Wolfie Smith
- Hopslinger American IPA
- 2Tone London Lager
- The Mayor of Garratt
- Morning Glory Stout

In 2014, it was reported that the eponymous star of the 1977-80 TV sitcom Citizen Smith, actor Robert Lindsay, was requesting that the brewery cease to use an image of him on their Wolfie Smith beer, as he did not wish to be associated with an alcoholic beverage. By the Horns agreed to redesign the label.

== Seasonal beers ==
Seasonal beers include:

- Mick the Miller
- Hopslinger Black
- Bobby on the Wheat
- Rum Ned
- Vive La Brett

The company has also produced a seasonal Christmas stout.

== See also ==
- List of microbreweries
