= Fackenden Down =

Nature reserve in Kent, England

Coordinates: 51.323°N 0.196°E

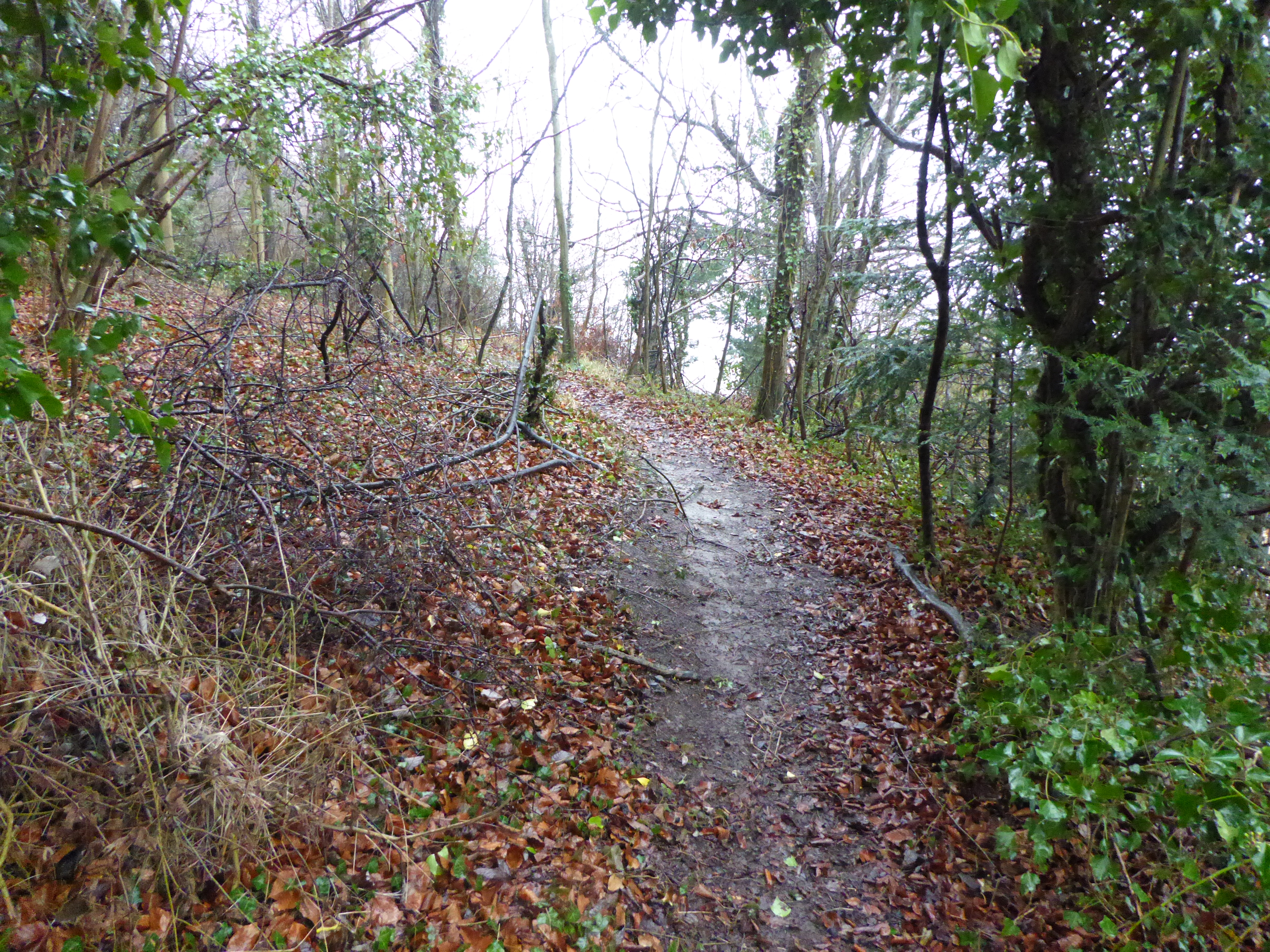
- Interactive map of Fackenden Down
- Type: Nature reserve
- Location: Sevenoaks, Kent
- OS grid: TQ 531 605
- Area: 14 hectares (35 acres)
- Manager: Kent Wildlife Trust

Fackenden Down is a 14-hectare (35-acre) nature reserve north of Sevenoaks in Kent. It is managed by the Kent Wildlife Trust. It is part of the Kent Downs Area of Outstanding Natural Beauty and the Otford to Shoreham Downs Site of Special Scientific Interest

This site is mainly chalk grassland, with some woodland and scrub. There are a variety of orchids, and butterflies such as the brown argus, common blue and dark green fritillary.

There is access from a road off Shoreham Road opposite Darenth Valley Golf Club.
