= Hancock, Wisconsin =

- Village
- Location of Hancock in Waushara County, Wisconsin.
- Coordinates: 44°6′55″N 89°32′7″W
- Country: United States
- State: Wisconsin
- County: Waushara

Area
  - Total: 1.05 sq mi (2.71 km^{2})
  - Land: 1.05 sq mi (2.71 km^{2})
  - Water: 0 sq mi (0.00 km^{2})
- Elevation: 1,086 ft (331 m)

Population (2020)
  - Total: 393
  - Density: 376/sq mi (145/km^{2})
- Time zone: UTC-6 (Central (CST))
  - Summer (DST): UTC-5 (CDT)
- Area codes: 715 & 534
- FIPS code: 55-32450
- GNIS feature ID: 1566028

Hancock is a village in Waushara County, Wisconsin, United States. The population was 393 at the 2020 census. The village is located within the Town of Hancock.

== Geography ==
Hancock is located at 44°7′55″N 89°30′55″W (44.132203, -89.515344).

According to the United States Census Bureau, the village has a total area of 1.12 square miles (2.90 km^{2}), of which 1.07 square miles (2.77 km^{2}) is land and 0.05 square miles (0.13 km^{2}) is water.

=== Climate ===
Climate data for Hancock Experiment Farm (1991–2020 normals, extremes 1902–present)
Month	Jan	Feb	Mar	Apr	May	Jun	Jul	Aug	Sep	Oct	Nov	Dec	Year
Record high °F (°C)	59 (15)	71 (22)	84 (29)	90 (32)	105 (41)	106 (41)	112 (44)	105 (41)	100 (38)	91 (33)	78 (26)	62 (17)	112 (44)
Mean daily maximum °F (°C)	24.9 (−3.9)	29.6 (−1.3)	41.3 (5.2)	55.1 (12.8)	68.1 (20.1)	77.4 (25.2)	81.5 (27.5)	79.3 (26.3)	71.6 (22.0)	58.1 (14.5)	42.6 (5.9)	29.9 (−1.2)	54.9 (12.7)
Daily mean °F (°C)	15.9 (−8.9)	19.6 (−6.9)	31.3 (−0.4)	44.0 (6.7)	56.6 (13.7)	66.3 (19.1)	70.1 (21.2)	68.3 (20.2)	60.4 (15.8)	47.8 (8.8)	34.1 (1.2)	21.8 (−5.7)	44.7 (7.1)
Mean daily minimum °F (°C)	6.9 (−13.9)	9.7 (−12.4)	21.2 (−6.0)	32.9 (0.5)	45.2 (7.3)	55.2 (12.9)	58.8 (14.9)	57.3 (14.1)	49.3 (9.6)	37.4 (3.0)	25.6 (−3.6)	13.8 (−10.1)	34.4 (1.3)
Record low °F (°C)	−43 (−42)	−40 (−40)	−39 (−39)	−3 (−19)	18 (−8)	29 (−2)	37 (3)	33 (1)	16 (−9)	0 (−18)	−19 (−28)	−32 (−36)	−43 (−42)
Average precipitation inches (mm)	1.14 (29)	0.97 (25)	1.86 (47)	3.57 (91)	4.19 (106)	4.95 (126)	4.15 (105)	4.02 (102)	3.31 (84)	2.71 (69)	1.98 (50)	1.42 (36)	34.27 (870)
Average snowfall inches (cm)	12.8 (33)	8.2 (21)	8.3 (21)	2.7 (6.9)	0.0 (0.0)	0.0 (0.0)	0.0 (0.0)	0.0 (0.0)	0.0 (0.0)	0.3 (0.76)	3.3 (8.4)	7.5 (19)	43.1 (109)
Average precipitation days (≥ 0.01 in)	8.5	7.5	8.1	10.8	12.3	11.8	10.3	9.4	9.8	10.0	7.8	8.4	114.7
Average snowy days (≥ 0.1 in)	6.5	5.6	3.6	1.2	0.0	0.0	0.0	0.0	0.0	0.2	2.1	6.7	25.9
Source: NOAA

== Demographics ==
Historical population
Census	Pop.	Note	%±
1910	510		—
1920	443		−13.1%
1930	420		−5.2%
1940	481		14.5%
1950	449		−6.7%
1960	367		−18.3%
1970	404		10.1%
1980	419		3.7%
1990	382		−8.8%
2000	463		21.2%
2010	417		−9.9%
2020	393		−5.8%
U.S. Decennial Census

=== 2010 census ===
As of the census of 2010, there were 417 people, 186 households, and 107 families living in the village. The population density was 389.7 inhabitants per square mile (150.5/km^{2}). There were 251 housing units at an average density of 234.6 per square mile (90.6/km^{2}). The racial makeup of the village was 94.2% White, 0.5% African American, 0.2% Asian, 4.1% from other races, and 1.0% from two or more races. Hispanic or Latino of any race were 11.0% of the population.

There were 186 households, of which 26.3% had children under the age of 18 living with them, 43.0% were married couples living together, 10.8% had a female householder with no husband present, 3.8% had a male householder with no wife present, and 42.5% were non-families. 33.9% of all households were made up of individuals, and 17.3% had someone living alone who was 65 years of age or older. The average household size was 2.24 and the average family size was 2.88.

The median age in the village was 45.2 years. 20.6% of residents were under the age of 18; 8% were between the ages of 18 and 24; 21.1% were from 25 to 44; 30% were from 45 to 64; and 20.4% were 65 years of age or older. The gender makeup of the village was 48.9% male and 51.1% female.

=== 2000 census ===
As of the census of 2000, there were 463 people, 193 households, and 121 families living in the village. The population density was 423.3 people per square mile (164.0/km^{2}). There were 254 housing units at an average density of 232.2 per square mile (90.0/km^{2}). The racial makeup of the village was 92.22% White, 1.08% Native American, 0.22% Asian, 4.32% from other races, and 2.16% from two or more races. 8.64% of the population were Hispanic or Latino of any race.

There were 193 households, out of which 30.6% had children under the age of 18 living with them, 49.7% were married couples living together, 8.8% had a female householder with no husband present, and 36.8% were non-families. 30.1% of all households were made up of individuals, and 18.7% had someone living alone who was 65 years of age or older. The average household size was 2.40 and the average family size was 3.01.

In the village, the population was spread out, with 26.8% under the age of 18, 4.3% from 18 to 24, 24.2% from 25 to 44, 24.6% from 45 to 64, and 20.1% who were 65 years of age or older. The median age was 41 years. For every 100 females, there were 87.4 males. For every 100 females age 18 and over, there were 96.0 males.

The median income for a household in the village was $35,341, and the median income for a family was $36,250. Males had a median income of $31,250 versus $21,500 for females. The per capita income for the village was $14,889. About 5.7% of families and 9.5% of the population were below the poverty line, including 9.4% of those under age 18 and 15.5% of those age 65 or over.

== Notable people ==
- Eleanor Fitzgerald, editor and theater professional.
- Flora E. Lowry (1879–1933), American anthologist
- James Franklin Wiley, Wisconsin State Senator.
