= Heaverham =

Hamlet in Kent, England

Coordinates: 51.3065°N 0.2524°E

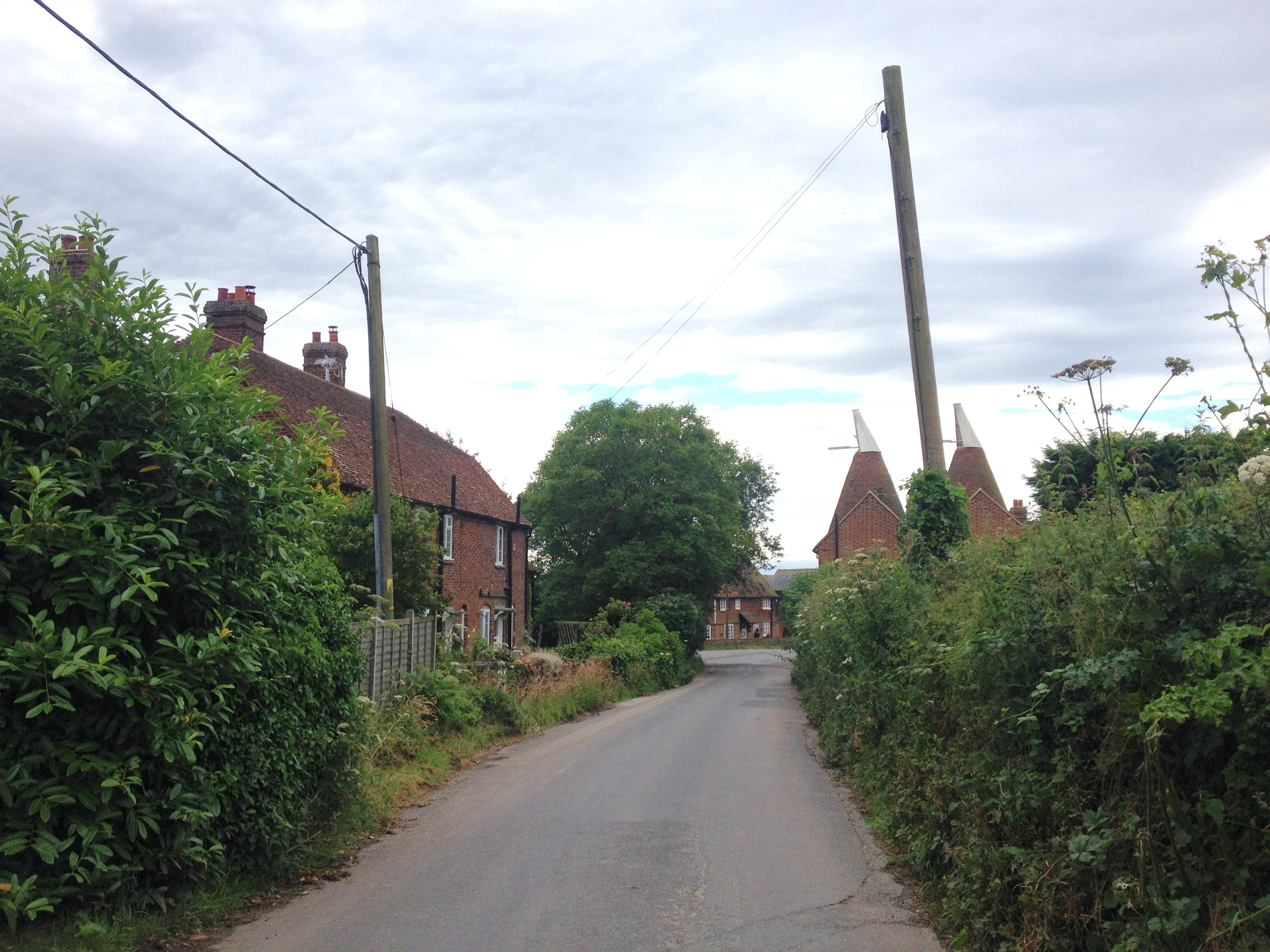
- Heaverham Road

- Location within Kent
- OS grid reference: TQ 57100 58780
- Civil parish: Kemsing
- District: Sevenoaks
- Shire county: Kent
- Region: South East
- Country: England
- Sovereign state: United Kingdom
- Post town: Sevenoaks
- Postcode district: TN15
- Police: Kent
- Fire: Kent
- Ambulance: South East Coast
- UK Parliament: Sevenoaks

Heaverham is a hamlet in the civil parish of Kemsing, in the Sevenoaks district, in the county of Kent, England. Nearby is the country estate of St Clere.

== Location ==
It is located about three miles away from the town of Sevenoaks, and around a mile away from the large village of Kemsing. Other nearby settlements include the villages of Ightham and Seal, and the hamlets of Cotman's Ash, Styants Bottom and Crowdleham.

== Transport ==
For transport there is the A225 road, A20 road and A25 roads, with the M26 motorway, M20 motorway and the M25 motorway nearby. There is also Kemsing railway station approximately half a mile away.

== Bibliography ==
- A-Z Great Britain Road Atlas (page 181), 2013, ISBN 978-1843489498
