= Bec School =

Location
- Beechcroft Road; Tooting, London, SW17; England; 51.436°N 0.166°W

Information
- Type: Grammar
- Motto: Latin: Floreat Florebit
- Established: 1926
- Closed: 1970
- Local authority: ILEA
- Gender: Boys
- Age: 11 to 18

Bec School (often referred to as The Bec) was a boys' grammar school in Tooting, South London, England.

== History ==
It was established in Tooting Bec in 1926.

The school closed when it was amalgamated with the adjacent Hillcroft School in 1971 to create Bec-Hillcroft comprehensive school. Bec-Hillcroft was renamed Ernest Bevin School, after the former Labour minister Ernest Bevin, the next year.

The original Bec School buildings were demolished in 1996 and part of the original school site was used for housing. Ernest Bevin School was renamed Ernest Bevin College in 1997 and occupies part of the former Bec School site. The school is now known as Ernest Bevin Academy.

== Alumni ==
- William Armstrong, Baron Armstrong of Sanderstead, chairman of Midland Bank from 1975 to 1980
- David Davis (British politician), Conservative MP for Goole and Pocklington
- Douglas Day, Queen's Counsel, Recorder of the Crown Court
- Michael Goldacre, Professor of Public Health, Oxford University
- Bob Hiller, former England rugby captain
- Art Malik, actor
- Mike Sarne, singer
- Professor Cedric A. B. Smith, (1929–32), statistician and geneticist
- Robyn Williams, science broadcaster
- Robert Balchin, Baron Lingfield, British educationalist
- Brian Paddick, Baron Paddick, British politician and former London Metropolitan Assistant Deputy Police Commissioner.
- Reginald Hollingdale, biographer and translator of German philosophy and literature.
- Tony McPhee, singer, lead guitarist and founder of The Groundhogs
- Sir Douglas Lovelock (1923-2014), Head of HM Customs and Excise, First Church Estates Commissioner, Chairman of the Whitgift Foundation
- Reginald Bottini, General Secretary of the National Union of Agricultural and Allied Workers from 1970 to 1978
