= Godfrey Pinkerton =

Godfrey Pinkerton (1858 – 1937) was a London-based British architect.

== Biography ==
=== Early life ===
Pinkerton was born at Godstone, Surrey, son of metal broker George Pinkerton (1823 – 1899), son of the missionary and linguist Rev. Robert Pinkerton, DD- and Mary (née Easum; 1823-1868). His siblings included the poet and translator Percy Edward Pinkerton.

=== Career ===
He attended the Liverpool School of Art and was articled to H & H P Fry of Liverpool from 1875 to 1879 and remained as assistant. He was assistant to Henry Saxon Snell from 1880, and started his own practice in London from 1884.

He was appointed a Fellow of the Royal Institution of British Architects (FRIBA) in 1908 and operated from offices at 39 St Andrew's Square in Surbiton, then 10 Lincoln's Inn Fields before the First World War, and then 2 Gray's Inn Sq, London, WC1.

=== Works ===
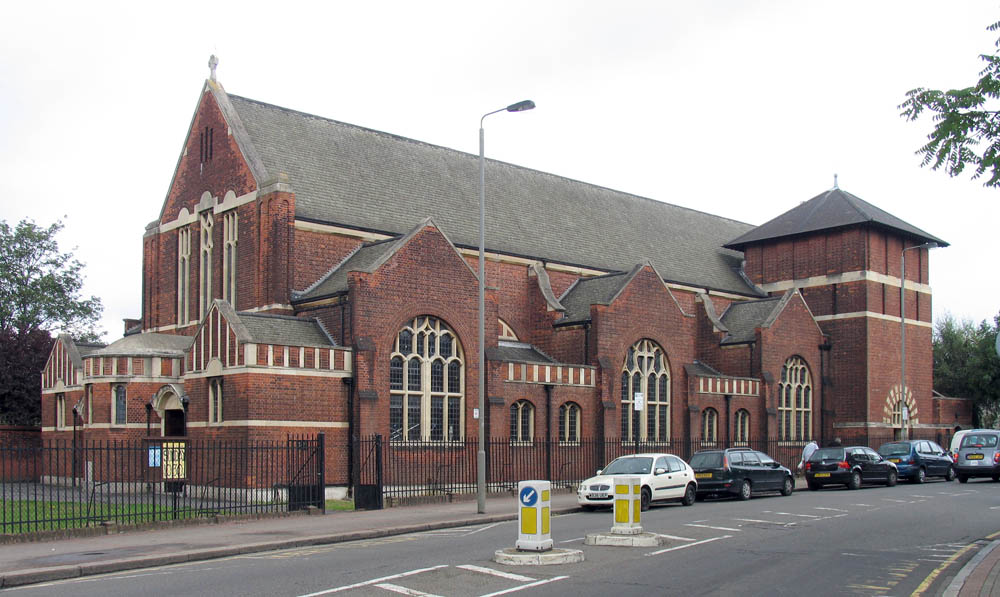
St Mary's Church, Keble Street, Summerstown

- St Mark’s Parish Hall, Balaclava Road, Surbiton, 1888-89
- St Mary's Church, Summerstown, London, SW17. 1903 Grade II listed
- National Westminster Bank building at Pavilion Buildings, Brighton. 1905 Grade II listed
- St Edith's Hall, Kemsing. 1911. Grade II listed
- Kemsing War Memorial. 1921 Grade II listed

=== Personal life ===
He died at Kensington, London, in 1937, and it appears that he never married.
