= Ernest Bevin Academy =

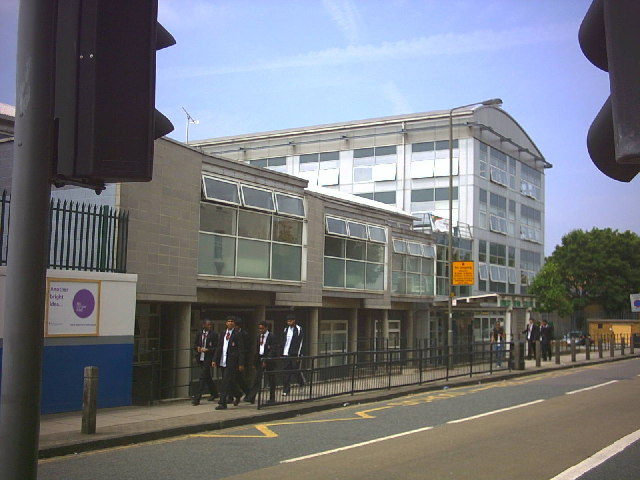

Location
- Beechcroft Road; Tooting, Greater London, SW17 7DF; England
- 51.438°N 0.168°W

Information
- Type: Academy
- Established: 1970
- Local authority: Wandsworth
- Trust: United Learning
- Department for Education URN: 149543 Tables
- Ofsted: Reports
- Principal: Damola Ademolake
- Gender: Boys (mixed sixth form)
- Age: 11 to 18
- Enrolment: 925
- Website: www.ernestbevinacademy.org.uk

Ernest Bevin Academy is a secondary school for boys and a mixed sixth form located in Tooting, London, England. The school is all-boys for ages 11 through 18, and has a co-educational sixth form. It has about 900 pupils. The school was judged as 'requiring improvement' in a November 2018 report by Ofsted. The school was judged as "Good" in a June 2022 report by Ofsted.

== History ==
The school was named after Ernest Bevin (1881–1951), a British labour leader and politician. It was formed through merging the two adjacent schools of Bec Grammar and Hillcroft Secondary Modern in 1971. The school was briefly named Bec-Hillcroft until 1971 when it became Ernest Bevin School. It was renamed Ernest Bevin College in 1996 .

Hillcroft Secondary School, Bec-Hillcroft and Ernest Bevin School ran under the aegis of the Inner London Education Authority until it was abolished by the Education Reform Act 1988. Since then the school has been run by the London Borough of Wandsworth.

Ernest Bevin College became a specialist college for athletics since 2000. Because of improvement in academic achievement, the college was offered a second specialism in Mathematics and Computing in 2004.

On 1 March 2023, Ernest Bevin College became a part of the United Learning Trust, with the new name 'Ernest Bevin Academy'.

== Sports Complex ==
Another major building development began in 2005; the construction of the new Sports and Sixth Form Centre. Additions included an indoor swimming pool, fitness suite and a judo dojo. This complex was officially opened in September 2007 by Dame Kelly Holmes.

== Sports at Ernest Bevin ==
Sports the school currently participates in, or facilitates students' participation in, include: Football, Rugby, Cricket, Swimming, Athletics, Basketball, Table tennis.

Ernest Bevin has won tournaments in volleyball such as the U16 Boys Nationals Title (2008). They were succeeded by Newcastle (Staffs) Volleyball Club in 2009.

Judo was one of the four focus sports at Ernest Bevin College and students are offered many opportunities to participate in the sport. The Judo team is licensed by British Judo Association and is called Ernest Bevin Phoenix Judo Club.

== Notable former pupils ==
- Eric Boateng, college basketball player
- Mike Bowron, Former commissioner for City of London Police
- Sean Davis, professional footballer
- Ortis Deley, television presenter, radio DJ and actor
- Marvin Elliott, professional footballer
- Winston Gordon, judo competitor
- Lennie James, actor and playwright
- Sadiq Khan, Mayor of London.
- Alan Knight, professional football goalkeeper
- Mad Professor, music producer
- Tony Meo, professional snooker player
- Jimmy White, professional snooker player

== Notable former staff ==
- Naledi Pandor, South African academic, African National Congress activist, and government minister
