= Helen A. Manville =

American poet (1839–1912)

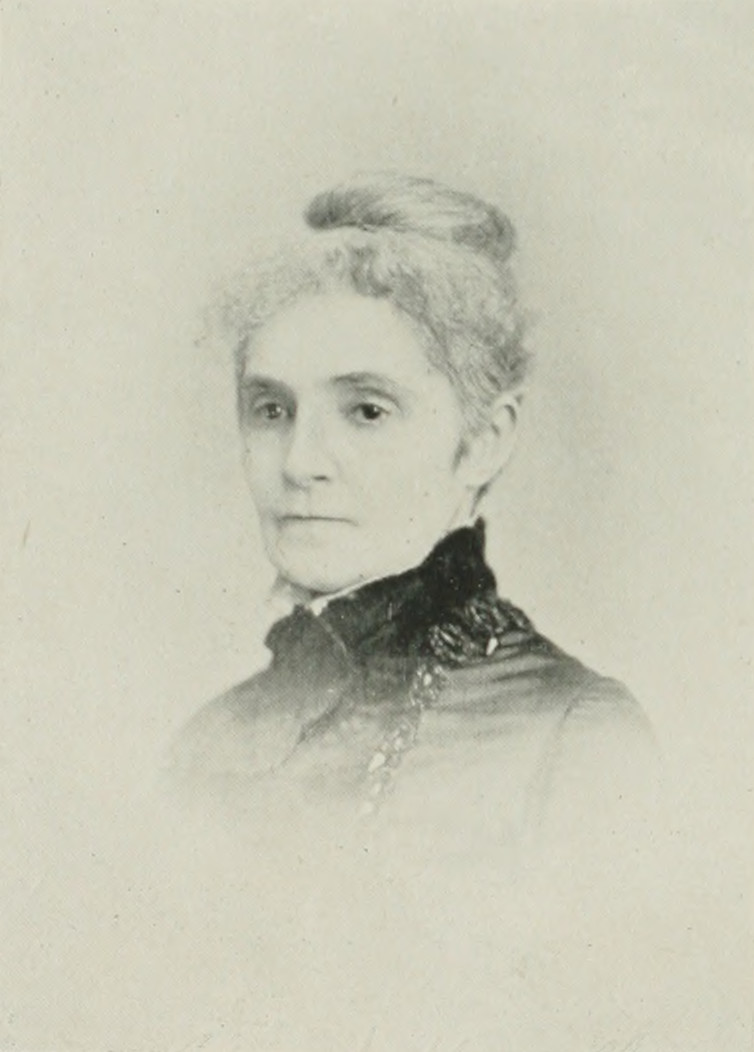
- Photo in A Woman of the Century
- Born: Helen Adelia Wood; August 3, 1839; New Berlin, New York, U.S.
- Died: 1912 (aged 72–73); Buenos Aires, Argentina
- Resting place: La Crosse, Wisconsin, U.S.
- Occupations: poet, litterateur
- Spouse: Marvin Madison Monroe Manville
- Children: Marion Manville Pope
- Relatives: Alice Cary; Phoebe Cary; Stephen A. Douglas
- Writing career
- Pen name: Nellie A. Mann
- Notable work: Heart Echoes

Signature
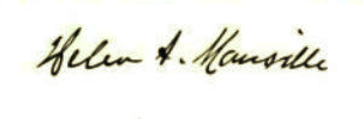

Helen A. Manville (née, Wood; pen name Nellie A. Mann; August 3, 1839 – 1912) was an American poet and litterateur of the long nineteenth century. Under the pen name of "Nellie A. Mann", she contributed largely for leading periodicals east and west, and obtained a national reputation as a writer of acceptable verse. At the height of her fame, she decided to stop using the pen name and assume her own. She succeeded in making both names familiar, virtually winning laurels for two cognomens, when ill-health required a pause in her literary work. A collection of her poems was published in 1875, under the title of Heart Echoes, which contained a small proportion of her many verses.

== Early life and education ==
Helen Adelia Wood was born in New Berlin, New York, August 3, 1839. Her father was Col. Artemus Wood. She inherited literary talent from her mother, several members of whose family won local celebrity, and who were connected with the Carys, from whom Alice and Phebe were descended, and also the house of Douglas, whose distinguished representative was Stephen.

Accompanying her father as Helen Wood, she removed to the West at an early day, and there she obtained her education.

== Career ==
For many years, Manville's pen name was "Nellie A. Mann", under which she contributed to leading periodicals. Renouncing her pen name, she assumed her own, and in 1875, published a collection of her poems entitled, Heart Echoes, which contained a small portion of her verse, for she had been a voluminous writer.

== Style and themes ==
The chief characteristics of her poetry are natural melody, smoothness of versification and an exalted sentiment. She was spiritual and believed in a supreme wisdom of infinite love, emphasising sympathy and understanding of others' trials and sorrows.

== Personal life ==
After she married Marvin Madison Monroe “M.M.” Manville (1829-1904), she lived in La Crosse, Wisconsin. She had one child, the poet, Marion Manville Pope. Manville died in 1912 during a visit with her daughter in Buenos Aires, Argentina, and was burled in La Crosse.

== Selected works ==
=== By Nellie A. Mann ===
- "Sunlight", Ballou's Dollar Monthly Magazine, 1868

=== By Helen A. Manville ===
- Heart Echoes, 1875 (text)
