= Percy Edward Pinkerton =

English translator and poet (1855–1946)

Percy Edward Pinkerton (19 June 1855 – 31 August 1946) was an English translator and poet. His translations included two novels by Émile Zola and a Puccini libretto.

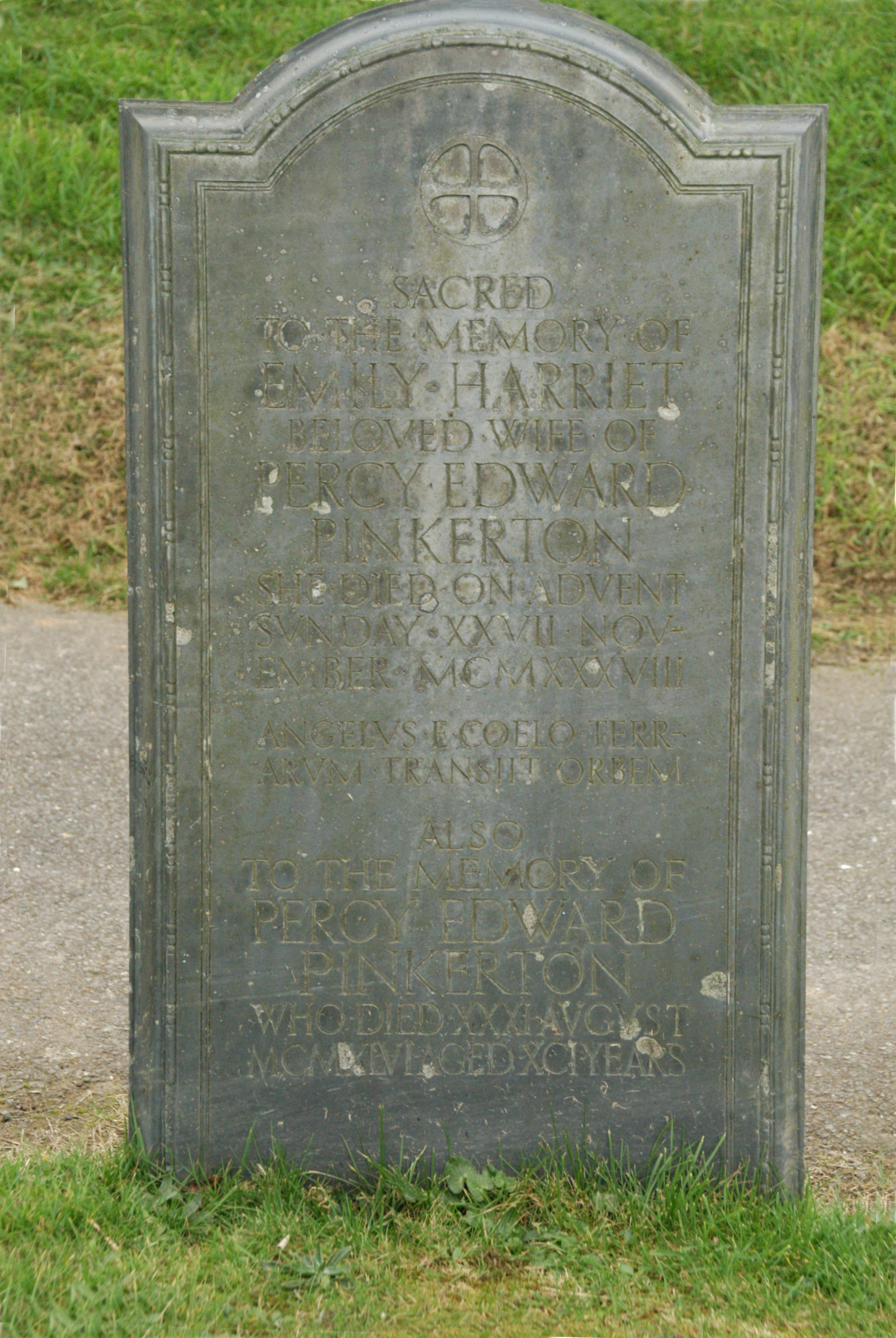
The Porthleven Cemetery headstone on the grave of Pinkerton and his wife Emily Woodgates reads: SACRED TO THE MEMORY OF EMILY HARRIET BELOVED WIFE OF PERCY EDWARD PINKERTON. SHE DIED ADVENT SUNDAY XXVII NOVEMBER MCMXXXVIII. ANGELVS E COELO TERRAVM TRANSIIT ORBEM. ALSO TO THE MEMORY OF PERCY EDWARD PINKERTON WHO DIED XXXI AVGVST MCMXLVI AGED XCI YEARS. The Latin translates as "An Angel from Heaven has crossed the Earth."

== Early life ==
Pinkerton was born at Stamford Hill, Middlesex, the third child of metal broker George Pinkerton (1823-1899), son of the missionary and linguist Rev. Robert Pinkerton, DD, and Mary (née Easum; 1823-1868). His siblings included the architect Godfrey Pinkerton.

== Writing ==
Pinkerton published some volumes of poetry: Galeazzo, a Venetian Episode: with other Poems (Venice and London, 1886), which was praised by John Addington Symonds, Adriatica (1894), At Hazebro' (1909), and Nerina, a lyrical drama in three acts (Cambridge, 1927). He also wrote for the Magazine of Art, and in 1889 edited Christopher Marlowe's plays. However most of his literary work consisted of English translations of European songs and literature. He was a member of the late Victorian Lutetian Society, dedicated to unexpurgated translations of the works of Émile Zola. The Society included Ernest Dowson, Havelock Ellis, Arthur Symons, Victor Plarr and Alexander Teixeira de Mattos. He translated other works from German, Italian, French and Russian.

== Translations ==
From German

- William Müller, Field-Marshal Count Moltke, 1800–1878, 1879
- Heinrich Düntzer, The Life of Schiller, 1883

From Italian

- Matteo Bandello, Novellieri Italiani. Twelve stories selected and done into English with a memoir of the author, 1892

From French

- Memoirs of Constant, the Emperor Napoleon's head valet, 1896
- Émile Zola, Restless House, 1924
- Émile Zola, "Pot Bouille" 1894-95 (Lutetian House, London)

From Russian

- Mikhail Artsybashev, Sanine, 1914
- Mikhail Artsybashev, The Millionaire, 1915

Operas and cantatas

- Puccini, La Bohème, 1896. Performed for radio in 1930
- Puccini, The witch-dancers, performed at Manchester in 1897
- Niccola Spinelli, A Basso Porto, performed at Brighton in 1900
- Franz Schubert, songs with pianoforte accompaniment
- Ermanno Wolf-Ferrari, The New Life, 1902
- Johann Sebastian Bach, Phoebus and Pan
- Hector Berlioz, Le Temple universel
- Francis Poulenc

== Lyrics ==
- Pansies, to Salut d'Amour by Edward Elgar

== Personal life ==
In 1909, aged 54, Pinkerton married 41-year-old Emily Harriet, spinster daughter of Rev. James Richard Woodgates, rector of Putley, Herefordshire. They lived at Red Lodge, Happisburgh, Norfolk. Pinkerton died on 31 August 1946, aged 91, at Ealing House, Porthleven, Cornwall. and was buried at Porthleven Cemetery alongside his wife. They had no issue.
