= Hillcroft School =

Hillcroft Secondary School

Location
- Beechcroft Road; Tooting, London, SW17; England; 51.438°N 0.168°W

Information
- Established: 1960
- Closed: 1970
- Local authority: ILEA
- Head teacher: John Owen
- Gender: Boys
- Age: 11 to 18
- Enrolment: c. 1000
- Houses: Churchill, Faraday, Shaftesbury, Wellington

Hillcroft School was a boys' secondary school in South London. In 1960, it was established in Tooting Bec, being built on playing fields of, and adjacent to, the premises of Bec School. The initial complement of pupils were drawn from Hillbrook Secondary School in Hillbrook Road, Tooting, and Estreham Secondary School in Penwortham Road, Streatham (housed in the same building as Penwortham Primary School). Hillbrook and Estreham then closed.

The school closed when it was amalgamated with Bec School in 1971 to create Bec-Hillcroft Comprehensive School. Bec-Hillcroft was renamed Ernest Bevin School, after the former Labour minister Ernest Bevin, in the next year. In 1996, the school was renamed to Ernest Bevin College. It is now known as Ernest Bevin Academy.

== History ==
Following its establishment, Hillcroft School enjoyed a substantial amount of academic success and supported a large sixth form, especially during the years of 1966 through 1970. A considerable number of boys achieved good O- and A-Level results, with many going on success at University, the Civil Service, and the professions. The school had a substantial prefect system which was considered helpful in advancing pupils' maturity.

The school was organised into four houses, each of about 250 boys: Churchill, Faraday, Shaftesbury, and Wellington. The school enjoyed a certain distinction at sports, with activities including five-a-side football, lacrosse, hockey, and swimming.

The school lacrosse team formed Hillcroft Lacrosse Club in 1971. The club is no longer formally affiliated with the school, but continues to thrive to this day, with their first team playing in the SEMLA premiership. The club now runs 4 teams, 3 men's and a women's and plays its home games at Tooting and Mitcham fc on the astroturf in front of the stadium.

From 1962 to 1971, the school was under the headmastership of John Owen, and the Senior Master was Tony Leech.
