= Kemsing =

Village in Kent, England

Coordinates: 51.307120°N 0.225180°E

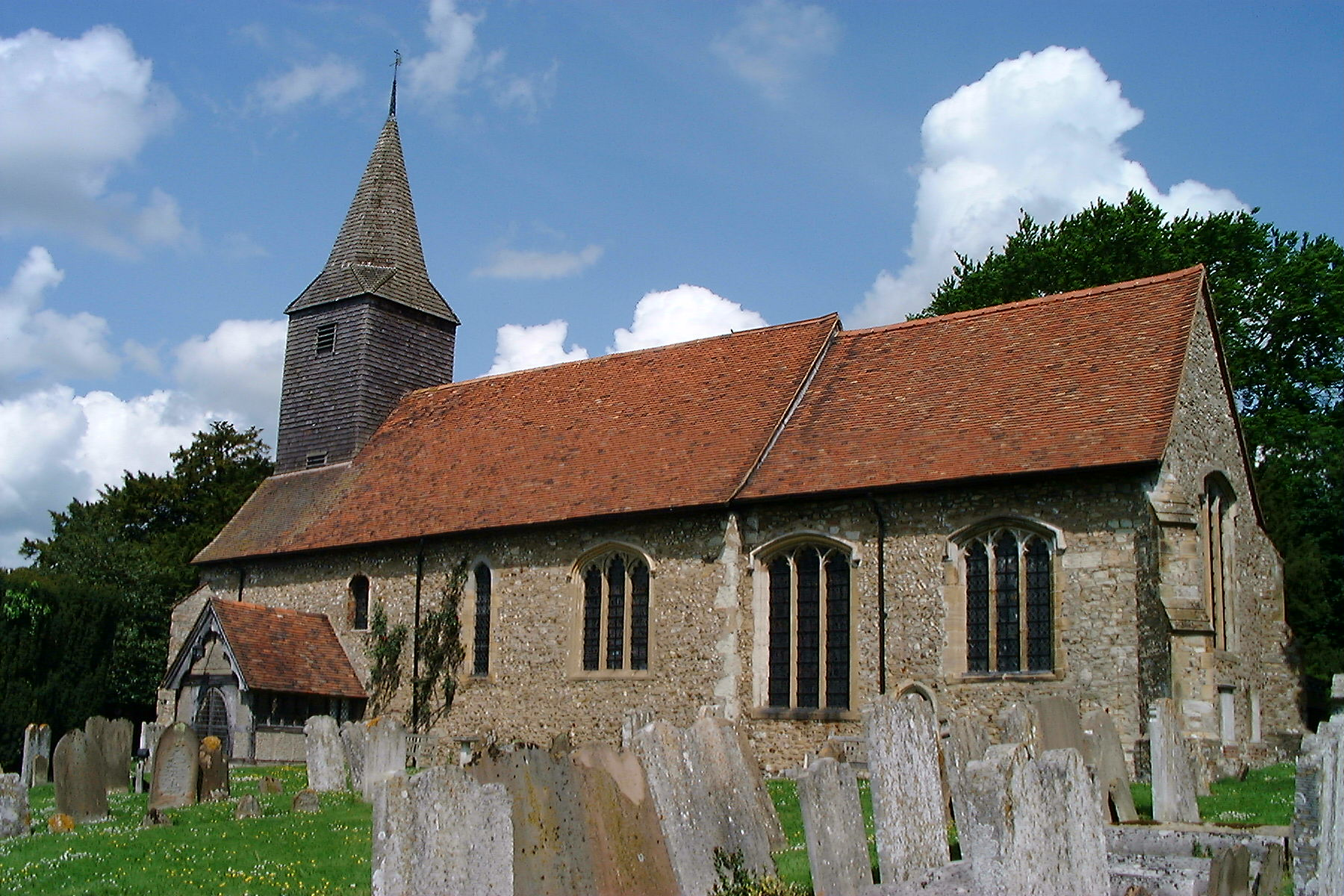
- Church of St Mary

- Location within Kent
- Population: 4,014 (2001); 4,218 (2011)
- OS grid reference: TQ545591
- District: Sevenoaks
- Shire county: Kent
- Region: South East
- Country: England
- Sovereign state: United Kingdom
- Post town: Sevenoaks
- Postcode district: TN15
- Dialling code: 01732 and 01959
- Police: Kent
- Fire: Kent
- Ambulance: South East Coast
- UK Parliament: Sevenoaks

Kemsing is a village and civil parish in the Sevenoaks district of Kent, England. The parish lies on the scarp face of the North Downs, 20 miles south east of Central London and 4 miles (6 km) north east of Sevenoaks. Also in the parish there are the hamlets of Heaverham, 1 mile (2 km) to the east and Noah's Ark 0.5 miles (1 km) to the south. The population of the civil parish in 2001 was 4,014 persons, increasing to a population of 4,218 at the 2011 Census.

== History ==
Kemsing was the birthplace of Saint Edith of Wilton, a daughter of the Anglo-Saxon King Edgar I between 961 and 964. The well at the centre of the village is dedicated to her, a plaque on the wall recording the local legend that her saintly presence has given the water healing properties. The parish church, Saxon in origin, is dedicated to St Mary the Virgin. Another local legend states that the knights who murdered Archbishop Thomas Becket rode through Kemsing on their way to seek him out at Canterbury. Following his canonisation, Kemsing became a stop-off place on the Pilgrims' Way, along which pilgrims travelled to visit the saint's shrine at Canterbury Cathedral.

The lordship of Kemsing had a long royal and noble association: it was held by King Henry II who passed it to Baldwin of Béthune, the Earl of Albemarle. It was acquired by the Earl of Pembroke by his marriage to Lady Alice, Baldwin's daughter. The manor passed later to the de Grandison and Fynes families, becoming part of the estates of Baron Saye and Sele. In the reign of Edward IV, Kemsing was sold to Sir Geoffry Boleyn, father of the future queen Anne Boleyn, and later reverted to the crown. Briefly in possession of Anne of Cleves, it was then granted by Elizabeth I to Sir Henry Carey and eventually acquired by the Duke of Dorset.

The historic village centre area around the well includes the war memorial of 1921 (Grade II listed by the architect Godfrey Pinkerton), a cluster of picturesque cottages and St. Edith's Hall, built in 1911 (Grade II listed by the architect Godfrey Pinkerton). Its front is adorned with a statue of the saint and a clock which chimes the hours and bears the inscription "'Tis mine / Each passing hour to tell. / 'Tis thine / To use it ill or well." In 2011, well dressing was introduced to the village and the 2014 well dressing commemorates World War I.

The Women's Institute organisation opened its first institute in Kent in Kemsing in December 1915. During the first world war St Edith Hall was used as a hospital and staffed by the Kent Voluntary Aid Detachment (VAD). Wounded soldiers from the western front were returned to England, and the hall at Kemsing was used by the VAD during the war.

== Geography ==
The main roads in the village are High Street, St Edith's Road, West End, Dynes Road and Childsbridge Lane. Kemsing railway station is a mile to the south-east. The M26 motorway passes through the parish. Between the motorway and the station lies the area of Kemsing known as Noah's Ark. The village contains one grade I, three grade II* and 31 grade II listed buildings recorded in the National Heritage List for England.

High Street was the location of two public houses, The Bell and The Wheatsheaf, sited directly opposite each other. On 3 June 2011 The Wheatsheaf suffered a serious fire, leaving The Bell as the only public house in the village. The Wheatsheaf was demolished in October 2012 to make way for three private dwellings. Further to the east at Heaverham is the Chequers.

Kemsing is in the Kent Downs, an Area of Outstanding Natural Beauty. The North Downs Way runs north of the village along the ridge of the Downs; it crosses the chalk grassland of Kemsing Down nature reserve, managed by Kent Wildlife Trust.

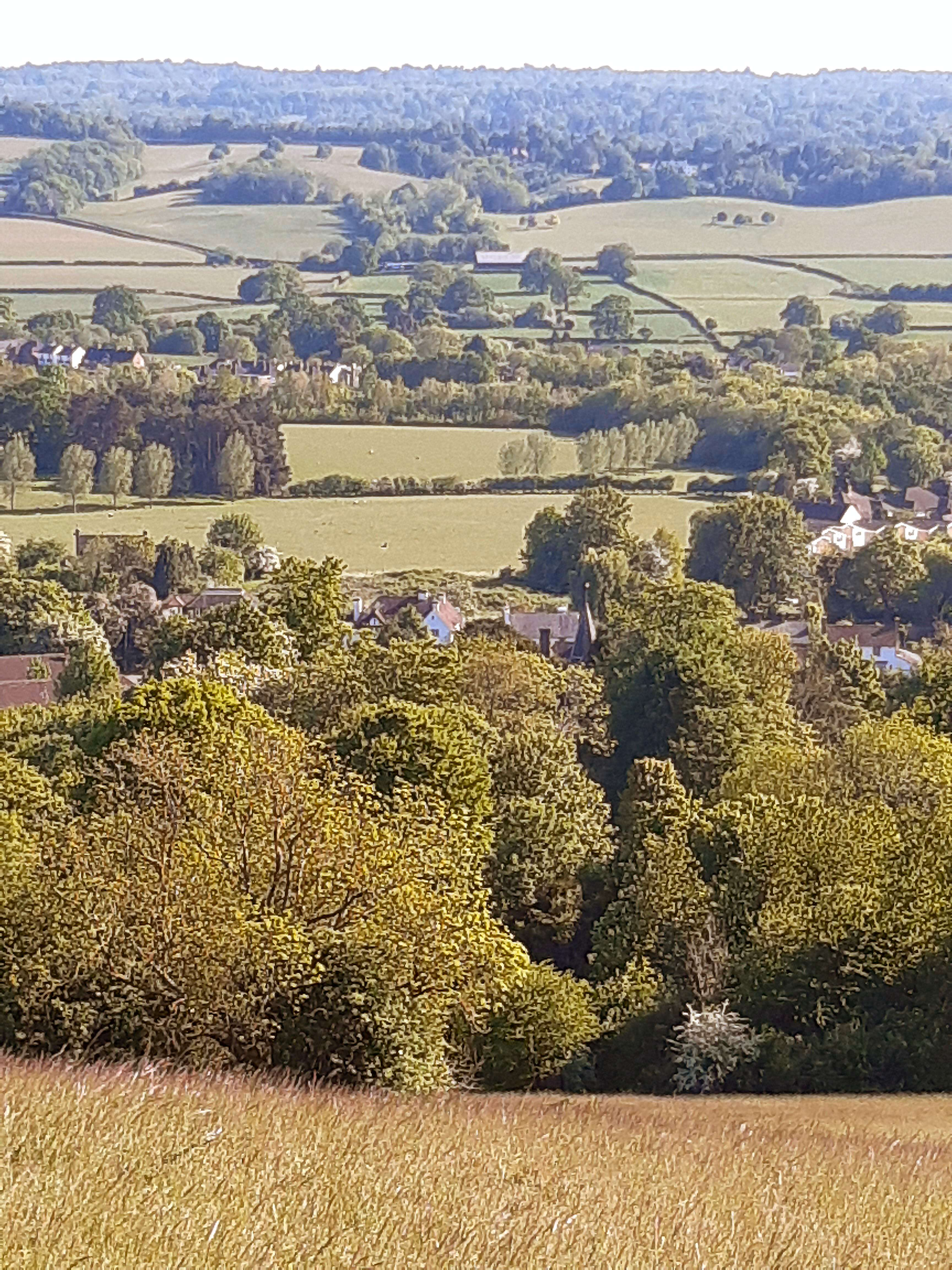
Kemsing from the North Downs

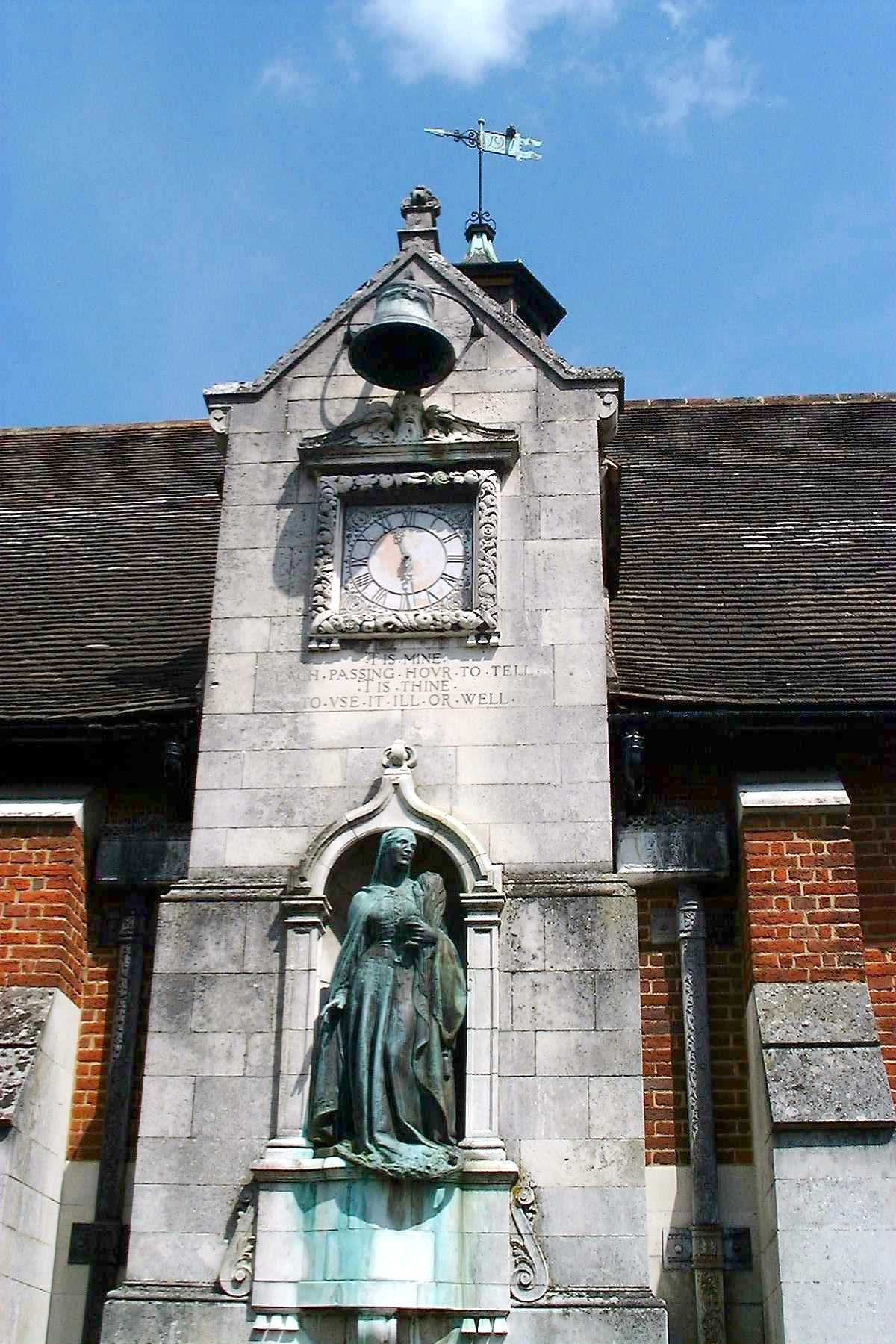
Clock at St Edith's Hall

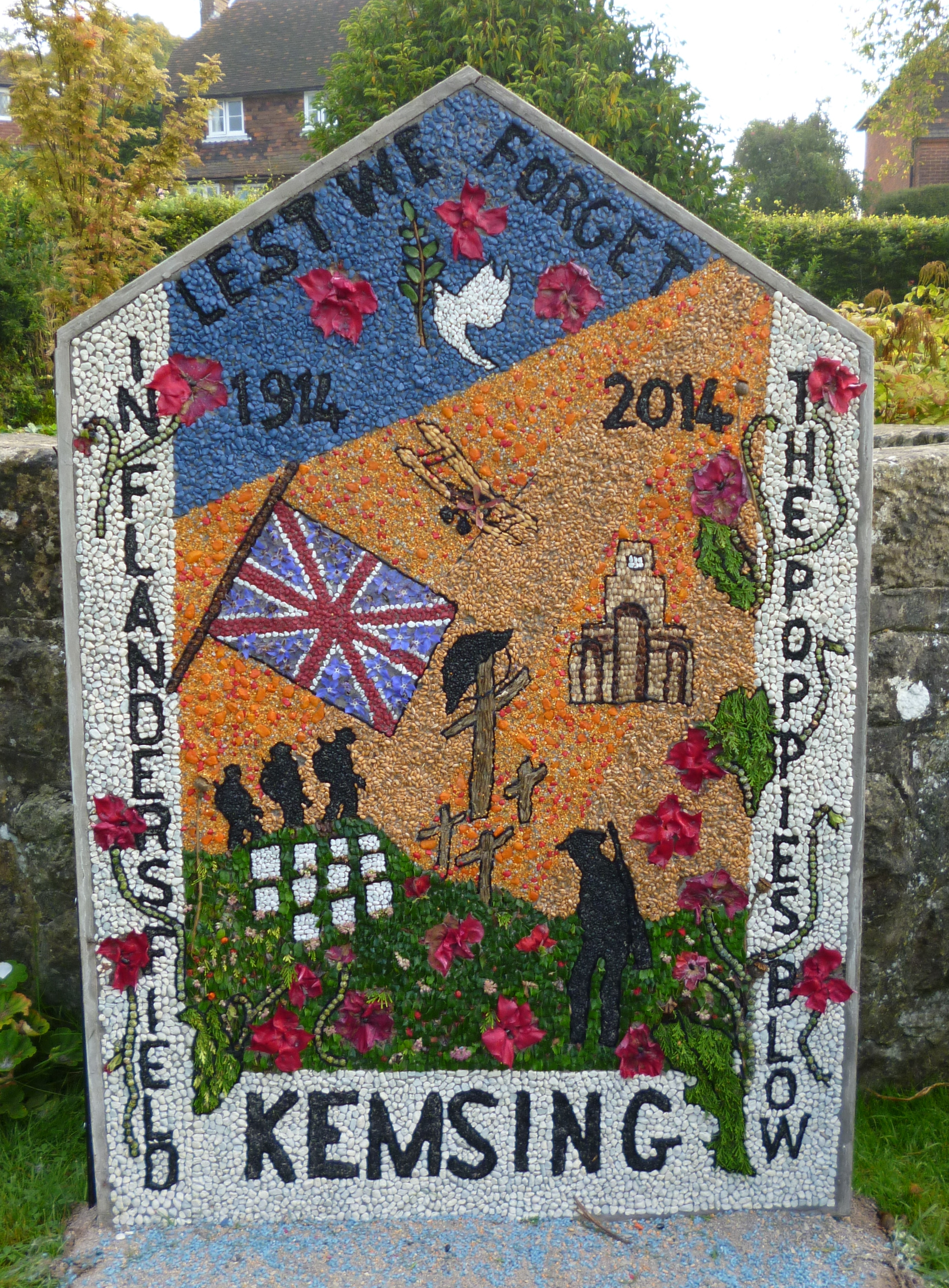
Well Dressing, 2014

== Church of St Mary the Virgin ==
The Church of England parish church of St Mary the Virgin likely dates back to Saxon times. The first time that Kemsing is mentioned is in a Canterbury diocese document of 822. The south wall of the nave was dated by an archaeological survey to late Saxon. A tall lancet window in the South Wall may be the earliest in the church. It contains the Madonna roundel (1220), an early piece of glasswork.

The altar frontals change with the church seasons. The oldest are by the Sisters of Bethany (1888). Two were by Comper. The reredos was designed by Comper and portrays the Annunciation, Nativity, Crucifixion, Burial and Resurrection.

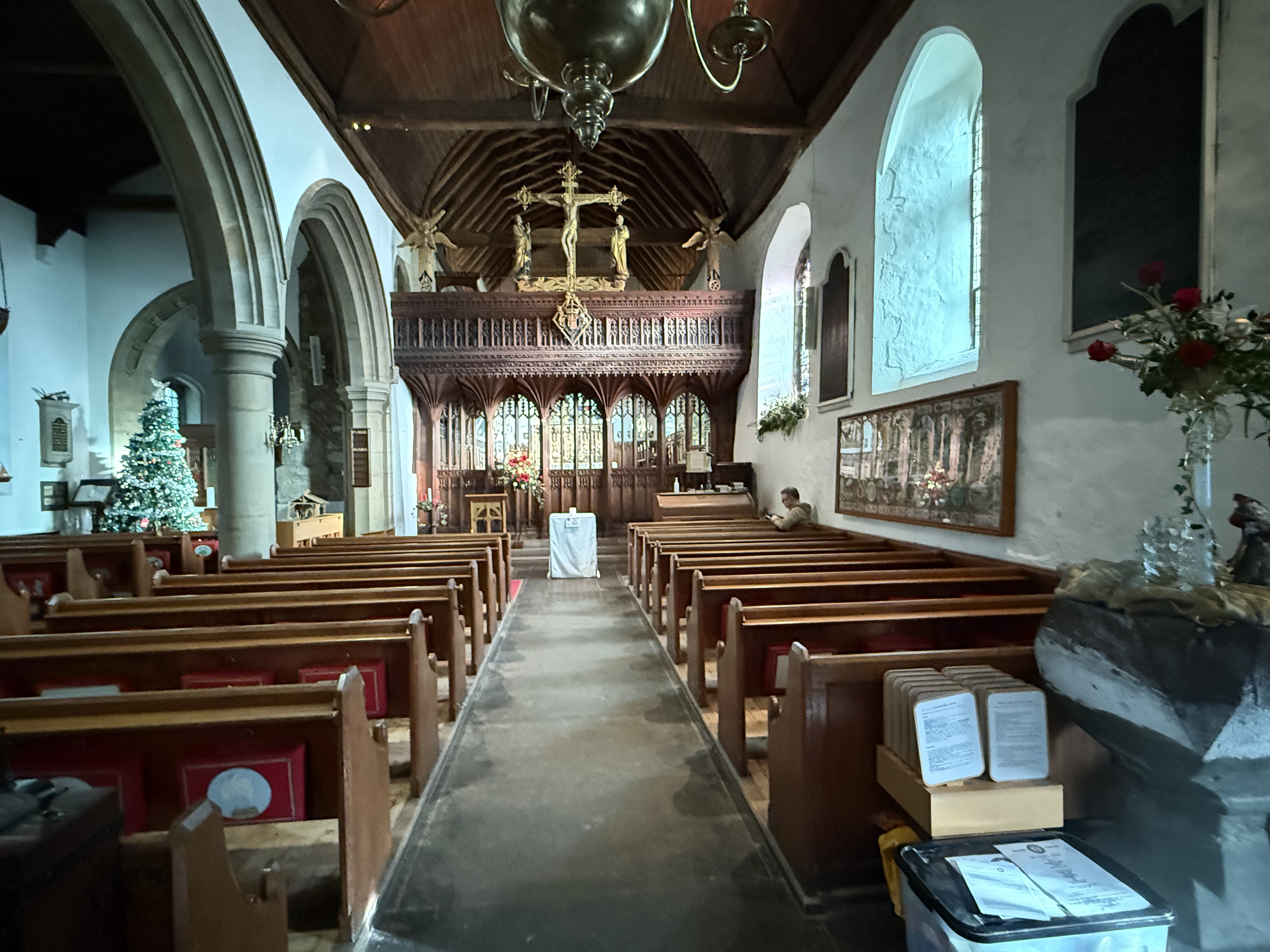
The nave. The lower part of the rood screen is fifteenth century, the upper part is by Unsworth (1894).The pews were made on the St Clare estate using local oaks.

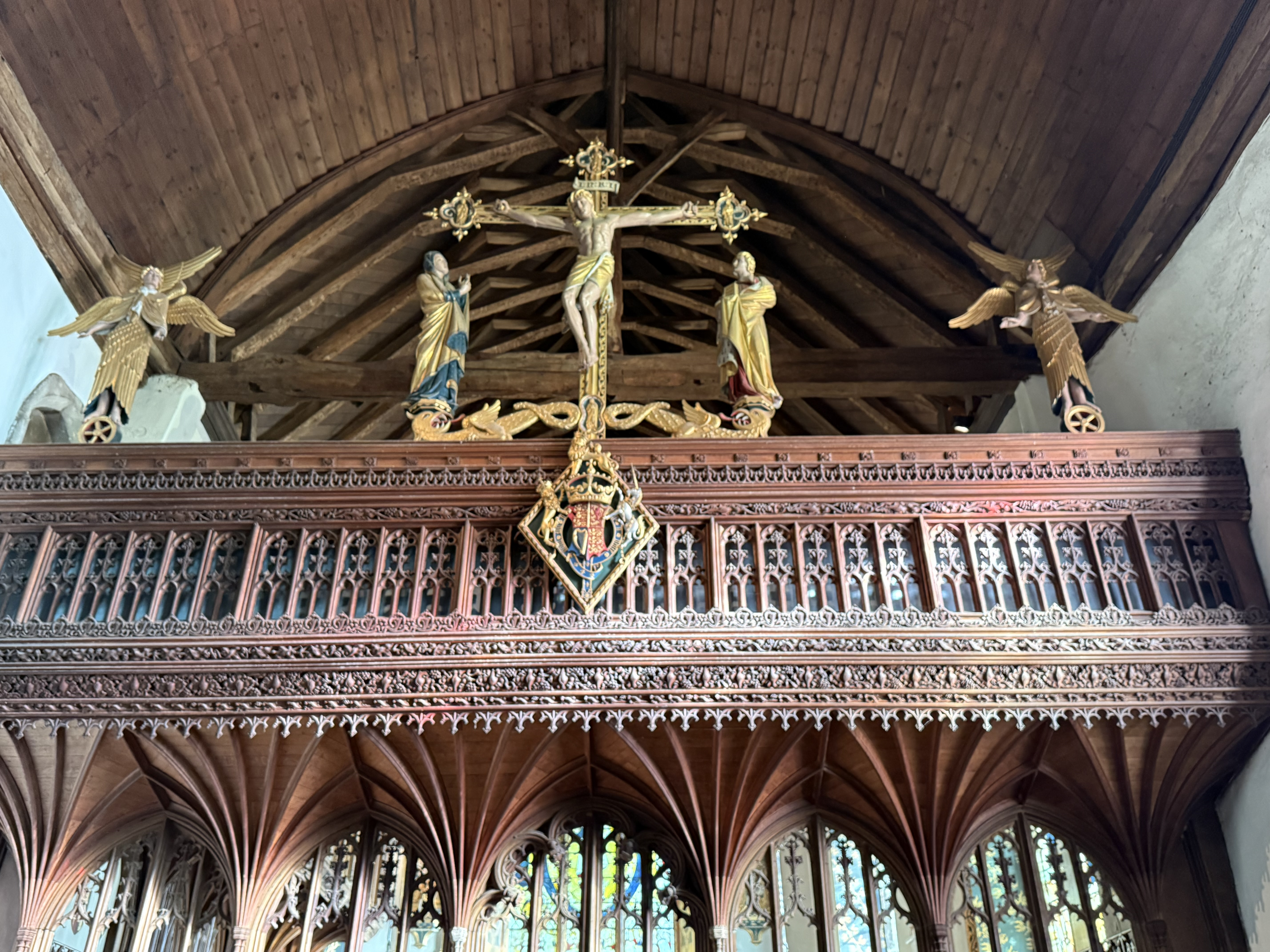
Detail of the rood screen. The beam carrying the rood cross and figures are by Ninian Comper (1908). Note the beardless Jesus.

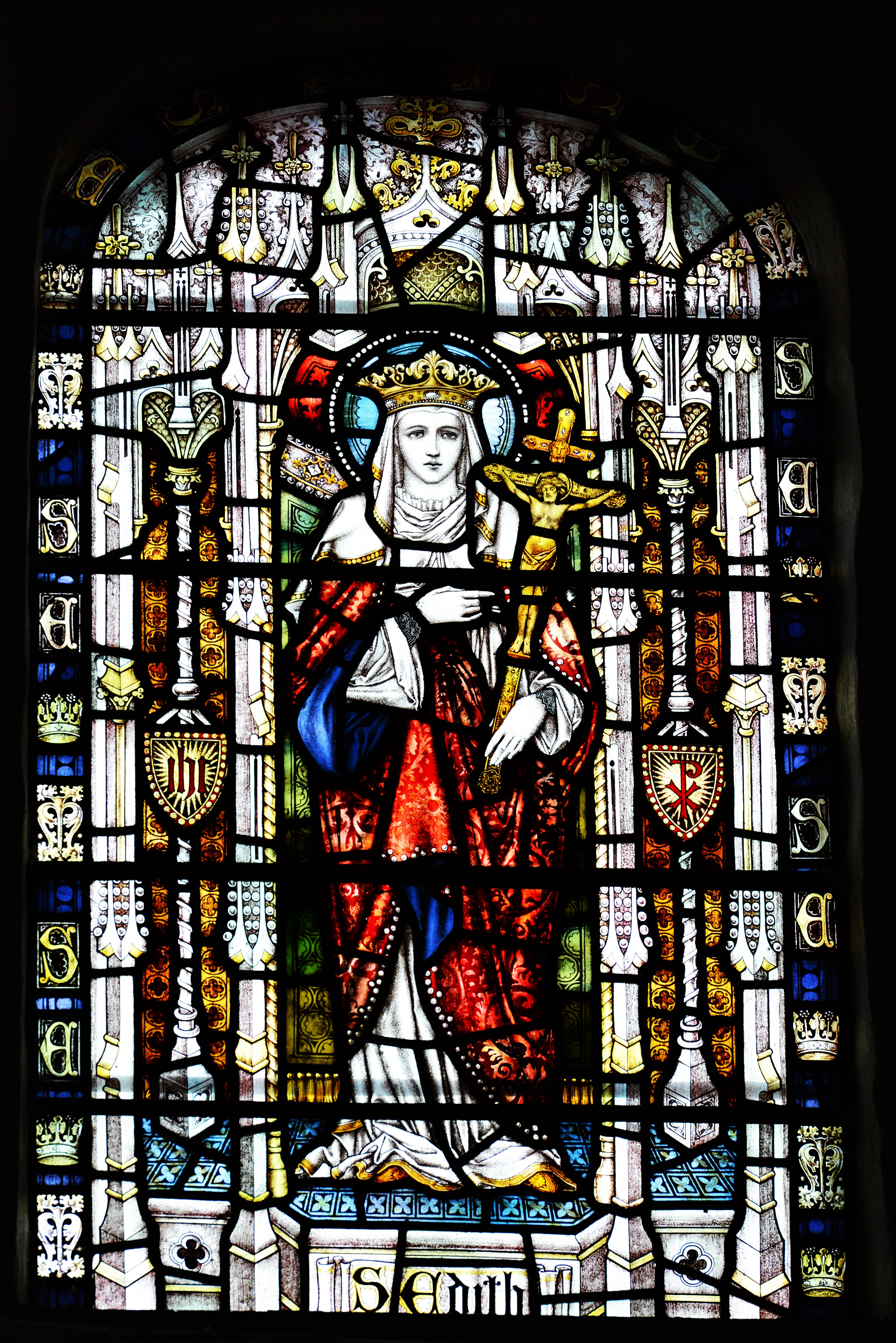
Stain glass window of Saint Edith and the glass (Powell and Co) is 1893.

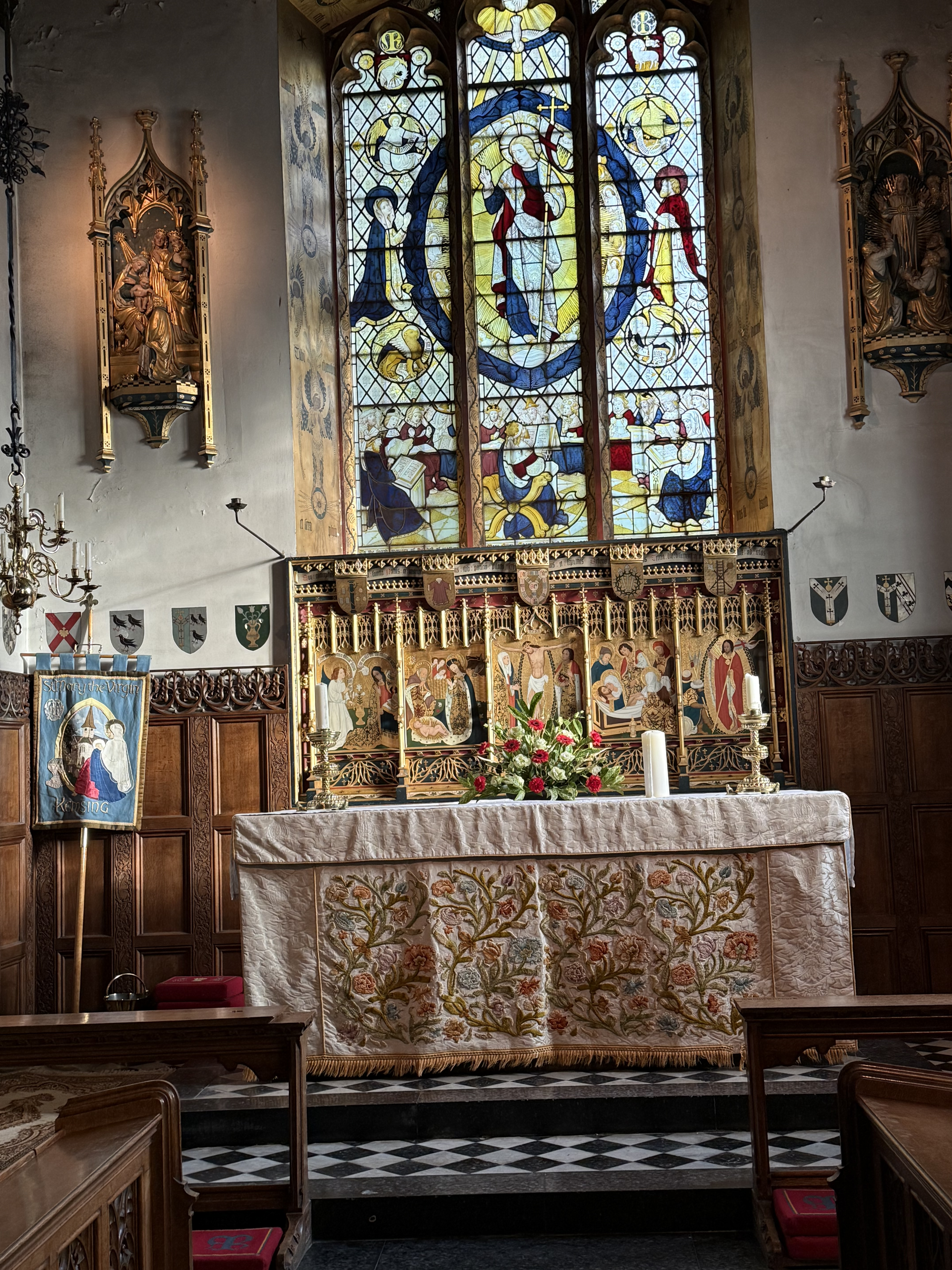
The altar and reredos

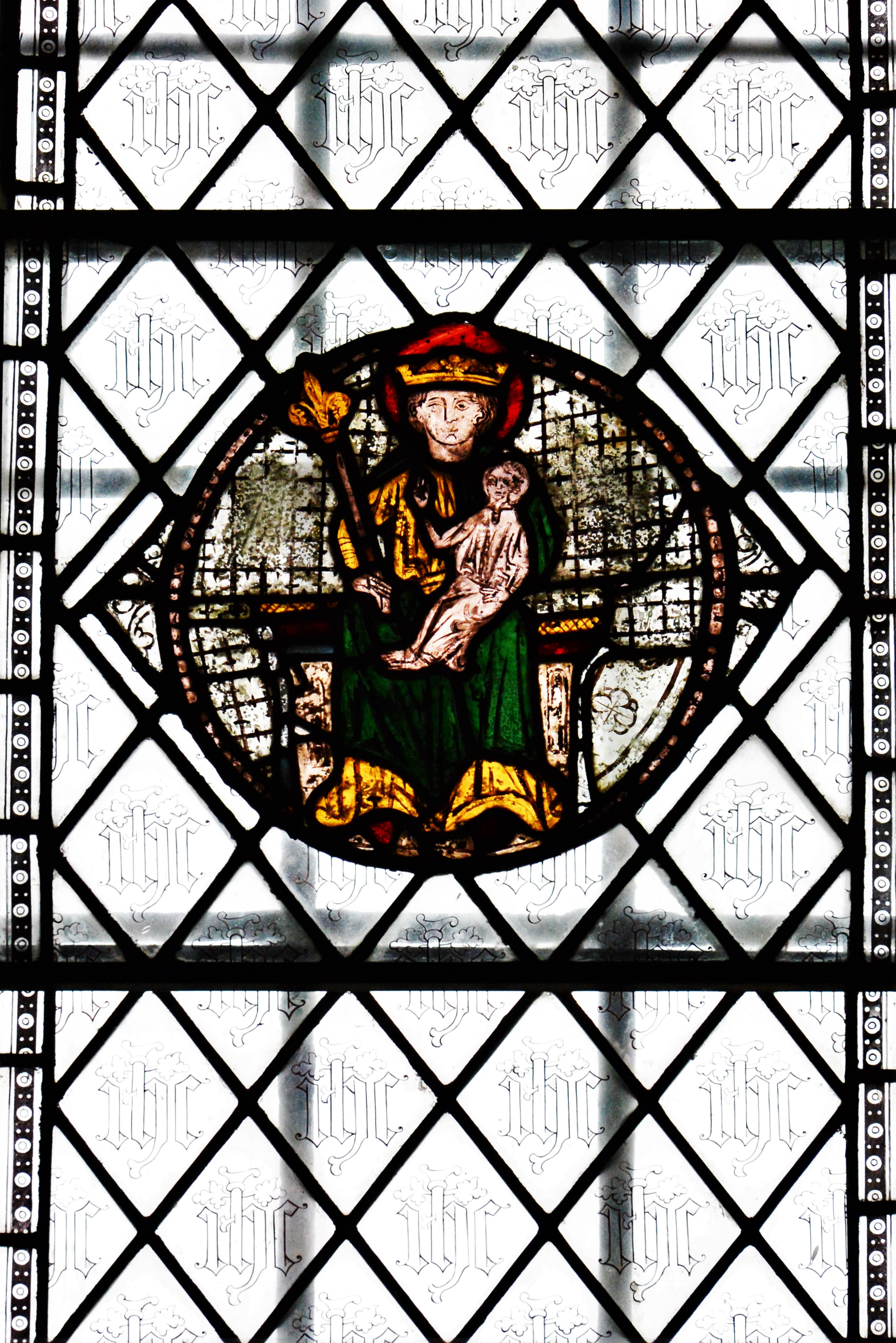
The Madonna Roundel (about 1220)

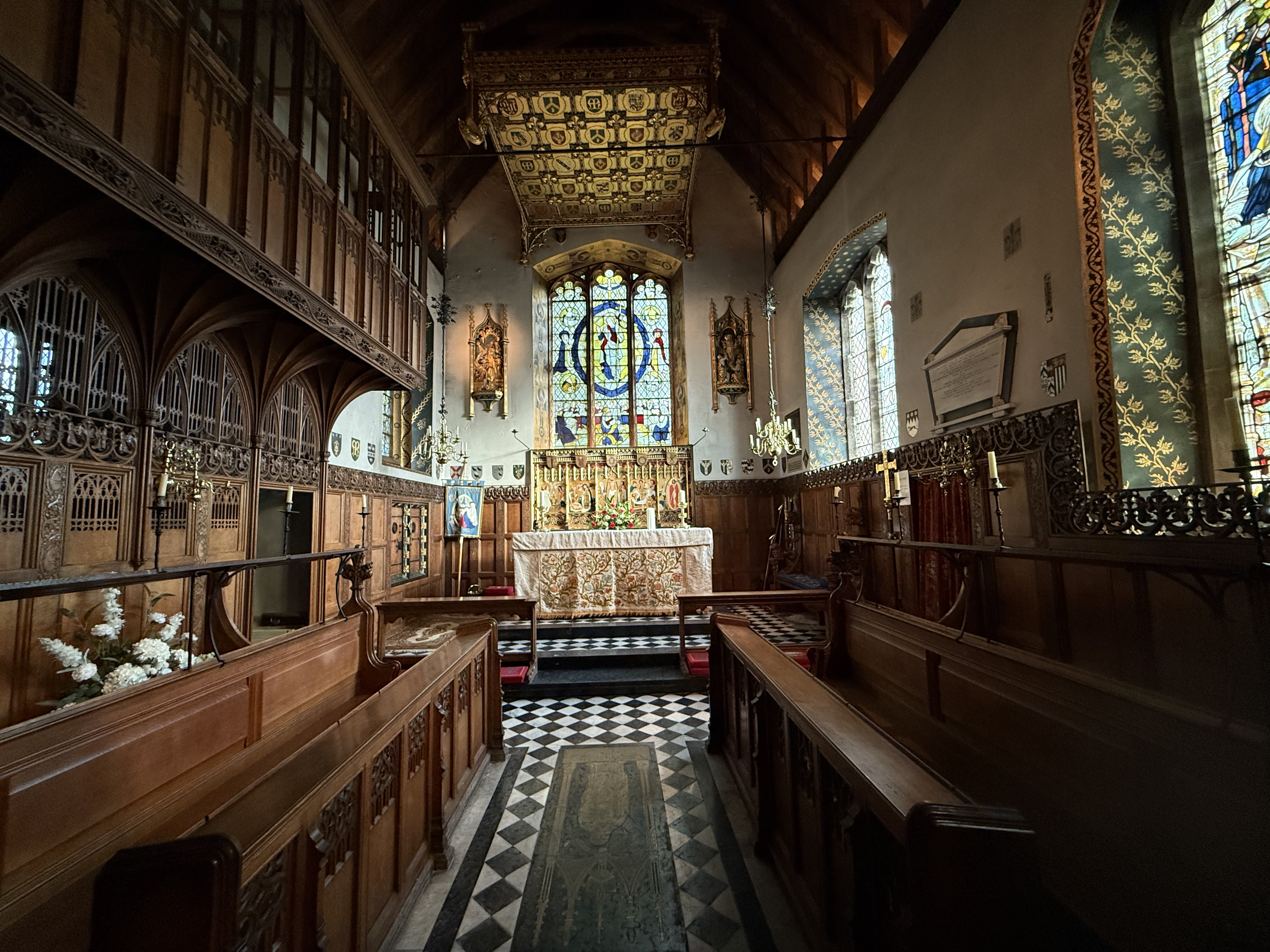
The chancel from the rood screen. The sanctuary and chancel are by Ninian Comper in the early 20th Century.

== Sports facilities ==
To the east of the village is the large open space known as The Common Field, used for cricket and football, and the Sir Mark Collet Sports Pavilion, with tennis and squash courts.

The cricket club has been in existence probably since the early 20th century, though no records can be found to establish a firm date. Matches were played in the cricketing field, close to the current site before World War I. The Common Field was given to the parish in October 1923 by Sir Mark Collet, with football and cricket being played there after that. The cricketers used other parts of the village between 1945 and the late 1950s, but the new (current) pavilion was built in 1987, with a new square also being laid, which has been used since that time. There is also a boxing club that operates and participates in local boxing events.

== Crime prevention ==
Kemsing has its own police community support officer and officers as well as being covered by regular police patrols. Neighbourhood officers hold frequent consultations with residents and Kent police. Crime in the Kemsing area fell by 31 percent in the period 2010-2011.
