= Marion Manville Pope =

American poet

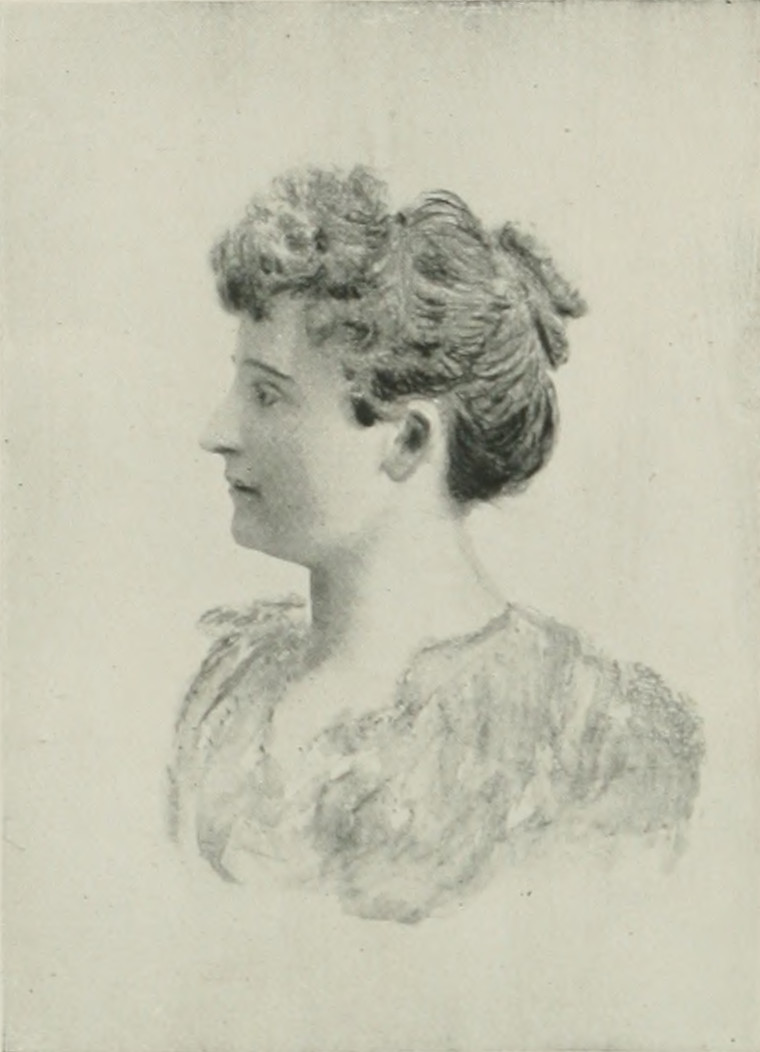
- Photo in A Woman of the Century
- Born: Marion Augusta Manville; July 13, 1859; La Crosse, Wisconsin, U.S.
- Died: December 22, 1930 (aged 71); Neuilly, France
- Resting place: Oak Grove Cemetery, La Crosse, Wisconsin
- Other name: "Minnie"
- Occupation: author
- Spouse: Charles Alvin Pope (m. 1891)
- Parent: Helen A. Manville
- Writing career
- Language: English
- Genres: poetry; juvenile literature
- Notable work: Up the matterhorn in a boat

Marion Manville Pope (née, Manville; July 13, 1859 – December 22, 1930) was an American poet and author of juvenile literature. Pope was a woman of liberal education with varied talents and accomplishments. After marriage, she made Valparaíso, Chile, her permanent home. Her writings inspired the allegorical sculpture, The End of the Trail by James Earle Fraser (1915). Her story of Up the matterhorn in a boat (1897) depicts the then-popular topic of flying machines. The two fictional aviators of the story use a flying boat to travel up the Matterhorn mountain in the Alps. But they meet dangers represented by avalanches and storms. One of the reviewers from 1898 commented that the story's seemingly futuristic topic of human flight may become an every-day affair by the end of the 1940s, predicting 50 years of further advancements in aviation.

== Early life and education ==
Marion (nickname, "Minnie") Augusta Manville was born in La Crosse, Wisconsin, July 13, 1859. She was the daughter of Marvin Madison Monroe Manville and Helen A. Manville. Pope was an active, intelligent and precocious child. In her early childhood, she wrote verses in great numbers, and most of her work was surprisingly good for someone of her age.

She was a pupil of the Lyceum School in New York City.

== Career ==
Some of her earlier productions were included with later ones in Pope's first published book, Over the Divide (Philadelphia, 1888). The volume passed through several editions, and the critics received it favorably. Many of the poems contained in the book were read by dramatic readers. Her poems found wide circulation, but she believed that her best work was her prose fiction. Her love for children led her to write for them, and in their behalf, she contributed both prose and verse to St. Nicholas Magazine, Wide Awake, Our Little Ones, The Nursery, Babyhood, and other children's magazines. "Her work shows, not only true poetic gifts, but also ... careful thinking and proper attention to form... Her poems are clear-cut and finely polished."

Pope's writings inspired the allegorical sculpture, The End of the Trail by James Earle Fraser (1915).

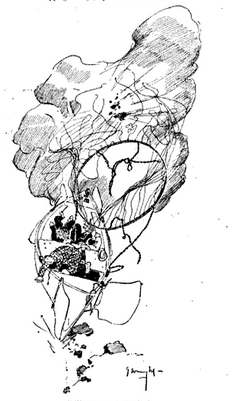
"There was a crash", from Up the matterhorn in a boat.

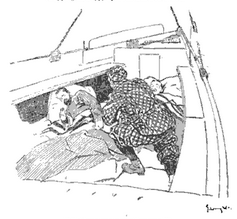
"Let me see your tongue", from Up the matterhorn in a boat.

Of Up the matterhorn in a boat, the Harford Post review in Book News: An Illustrated Magazine of Literature and Books (1897), said of it:—

"Mrs. Marion Manville Pope has solved the problem of flying machines which has recently attracted so much attention from inventors all over the world. She has constructed a boat, “The Cloud Queen,” in which she takes two typical Americans up the Matterhorn. She does not reveal the full secret of her contrivance, but she tells enough to show that it can be depended upon to carry its passengers through most amazing experiences. The story is an extravaganza of a thoroughly up-to-date character, and is full of rollicking humor. But the author has written in a realistic vein, so that her readers are almost beguiled into believing the truth of the narrative. The two Americans and their dog, which is quite a character in the book, meet with surprising adventures, including perils from avalanches, precipices and storms; and they succeed in rescuing a stolid Englishman from the snow, and he furnishes a foil for the humor of the Americans. Mr. Wright's pictures are in full accord with the spirit of the text."

The Delineator (1898) provided a review as well, saying:—

"Up the Matterhorn in a Boat is a grotesque and amusingly incredible tale, possibly intended to prepare our minds for the upward and downward flights that within the next fifty years may possibly come to seem very prosaic and quite every-day affairs. There are funny episodes, tragic events, privations by cold and hunger, involuntary ups and downs and much of that sort of slangy epigram in conversation that may have been due to abnormal experiences, but more likely to habits formed while not ascending a mountain in a boat. For comicality and for exercising an untethered imagination as an inspiration to laugh, this tale may be commended. It is droll throughout, and Marion Manville Pope must be a jolly being to have invented it."

== Personal life ==
On September 22, 1891, she married Charles Alvin Pope, FRGS, author, of Valparaíso, Chile, and she made that city her permanent home. Her travels thereafter included Cuba and Mexico.

Pope was a dramatic reader, and an artist of merit. Her work included crayon, oils, and pen and ink. She modeled well, and some of her heads were genuinely artistic. She was a social favorite in society.

Marion Manville Pope died in Neuilly, France, December 22, 1930.

== Selected works ==
=== By Marion Manville ===
- Over the divide and other verses, 1888

=== By Marion Manville Pope ===
- A judicial error, 1896
- Up the matterhorn in a boat, 1897
- Between two gods : [an allegory], 1917
