= Robert Pinkerton =

Robert Pinkerton (1780, Foulshiels near Selkirk, Scotland – 7 April 1859, Reigate, Surrey, England) was a Principal Agent of the British and Foreign Bible Society (BFBS). He was a respected missionary, linguist, translator and author of several books including, most notably The Present State of the Greek Church in Russia (1816) and Russia or Miscellaneous Observations on the past and present state of that country and its inhabitants (1833). Pinkerton travelled widely, especially in Russia, Europe (Germany in particular) and Greece encouraging the setting up of Bible societies, writing copiously about his travels and translating other authors' works from Russian, Greek and other languages.

== Biography ==
In 1813 Pinkerton helped found the Russian Bible Society in St Petersburg; he then toured Germany (including Dresden especially) returning to Russia for three years before making a two-year missionary tour of Europe including Greece. Between 1823 and 1830 he lived in London with some of his family after which he moved to Frankfurt to take the post of Sole Agent for the BFBS in the German-speaking countries in Europe.

In the 1820s Pinkerton found himself having to resolve his opinions of the conflicting views of the BFBS and those of Robert Haldane that came to be known as the Apocrypha Controversy and which resulted in a split and the formation of the Scottish Bible Society.

Pinkerton married Dorothea, née possibly Theakston, about 1807 at her home town of Sarepta, Volgograd, Russia and had at least nine children. Pinkerton is not found on a British census record but his wife Dorothea and those children who chose to live in Britain are found.

Pinkerton was the grandfather of linguist and translator Percy Edward Pinkerton and the architect Godfrey Pinkerton.
