= Kathrene Pinkerton =

- Born: Kathrene Sutherland Gedney; June 9, 1887; Minneapolis, Minnesota
- Died: September 6, 1967 (aged 80); New York City
- Education: University of Wisconsin (BA)
- Spouse: Robert E. Pinkerton
- Children: 1
- Writing career
- Genre: Non-Fiction, Autobiography, Fiction
- Subject: Wilderness life
- Notable works: Wilderness Wife (1939); Three's a Crew (1940); Two Ends to Our Shoestring (1941)

Kathrene Pinkerton (June 9, 1887 – September 6, 1967) was a fiction and nonfiction writer whose writings focused on life in the northern wilderness of Canada.

== Life ==
Pinkerton was born Kathrene Sutherland Gedney on June 9, 1887, in Minneapolis, Minnesota. Later, she went on to earn a BA at the University of Wisconsin in 1909. Upon graduating, Pinkerton went on to conduct social work, focusing on tuberculosis outbreaks in rural Wisconsin.

On March 24, 1911, she married Robert E. Pinkerton (1882–1970), also a writer. In 1912, the couple moved to the wilderness of northern Ontario. There, they built their own cabin and learned how to survive in a region where the nearest village was 8 miles (13 km) away and could only be reached by canoe in summer and by dogsled in winter. There the couple focused on nonfiction writings, making a decent living submitting them to wilderness magazines. They remained there for some time, only emerging from the back country briefly for the birth of their daughter, Bobs Pinkerton. They returned to their cabin seven weeks after her birth.

In 1917, the family moved to Colorado and later California before choosing to live on a 50-foot (15 m) boat off the British Columbia and Alaska coasts from 1924 to 1931. Originally only intending to live there three months, the family spent seven years there, with Kathrene as the mate, Robert as the skipper, and daughter Bobs as the quartermaster when on vacation from boarding school. It was during this time that Kathrene focused on her writing, having started in 1922.

Pinkerton died on September 6, 1967, at New York after suffering from cancer. She was 80 years old.

== Writing career ==
Pinkerton wrote in many different media, including newspaper and magazine articles, fictional works, and short stories, but her non-fiction works are what she is best known for. Some of her most famous autobiographical books are Wilderness Wife (1939), Three's a Crew (1940), and Two Ends to Our Shoestring (1941). She chose to write from and about her experiences, as much of her content matter revolved around the wilderness that she and her family lived in and explored.

=== Works ===
- Foiling the "Free Trader" (1921)
- Wilderness Wife (1939)
- Three's a Crew (1940)
- Adventure North (1940)
- Two Ends to Our Shoestring (1941)
- Fox Island (1942)
- Farther North (1944)
- Windigo (1945)
- The Silver Strain (1946)
- Bright With Silver (1947)
- Hidden Harbor (1950)
- Year of Enchantment (1950)
- Peddler's Crew (1954)
- Steer North! (1962)
