= William ffolkes =

William ffolkes or Ffolkes may refer to:

- Sir William ffolkes, 2nd Baronet (1786–1860), MP for Norfolk
- William Ffolkes (cricketer) (1820–1867), cricketer and son of the above
- Sir William ffolkes, 3rd Baronet (1847–1912), MP for King's Lynn
