= Coscote =

Hamlet in Oxfordshire, England

Coordinates: 51.5909°N 1.2571°W

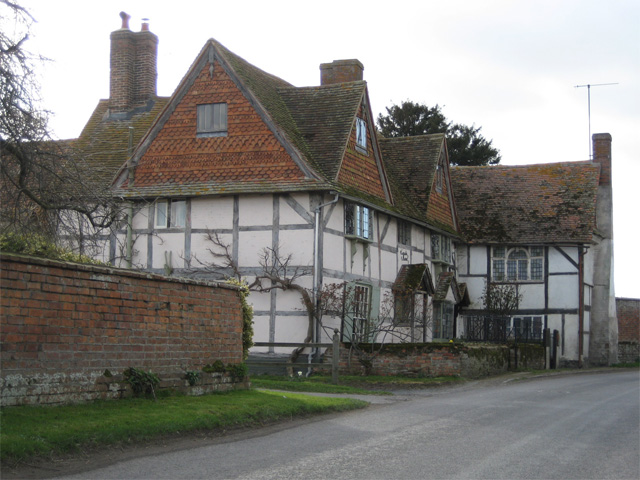
- Coscote Manor

- Location within Oxfordshire
- OS grid reference: SU515882
- Civil parish: East Hagbourne
- District: South Oxfordshire
- Shire county: Oxfordshire
- Region: South East
- Country: England
- Sovereign state: United Kingdom
- Post town: DIDCOT
- Postcode district: OX11
- Dialling code: 01235
- Police: Thames Valley
- Fire: Oxfordshire
- Ambulance: South Central
- UK Parliament: Wantage

Coscote is a hamlet in the civil parish of East Hagbourne, in the Berkshire Downs 1 mile (1.6 km) south of Didcot. The hamlet was also previously referred to as Cokelscote. Coscote is now in Oxfordshire, and in 1974 was transferred from Berkshire. Currently, the Church of England church St Andrew's, Hagbourne claims the hamlet as one of its parish communities.

== Coscote Manor and other historical features ==
Notably, the town contains the 17th-century building, Coscote Manor, which is a Grade II listed building, under the name "Coscote Manor and Yew Tree Famhouse and Attached Wall, East Hagbourne." The building was listed on 9 April 1952. The manor is a timber-framed 17th-century house with fretwork bargeboards and an Ipswich window. The house and surrounding hamlet were described in the 1913 travel journal Quiet roads and sleepy villages by Allan Fae. As of 1923, regional historians P.H. Ditchfield and William Page note that Coscote contained the base of one of three medieval crosses in Hagbourne.

== Transport ==
Coscote is served by 6 buses a day Monday - Saturday, by the Abingdon Bus Company's Route 94, from West Hagbourne to Didcot via Blewbury.

== Gallery ==
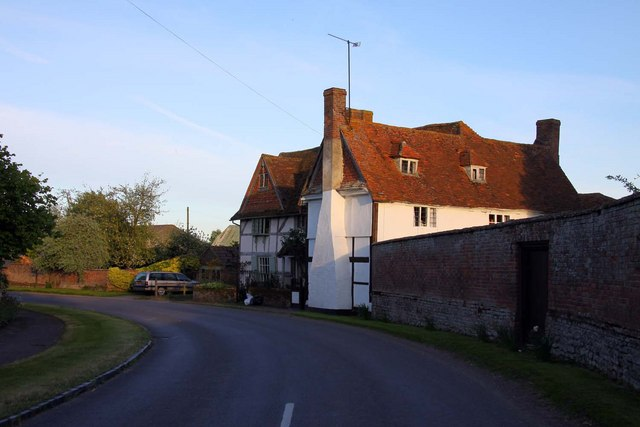
An alternative view of Coscote Manor
