= Tracy Philipps =

British public servant (1888–1959)

- Born: James Edward Tracy Philipps; 20 November 1888; Hillington, Norfolk
- Died: 21 July 1959 (aged 70); Radcliffe Infirmary, Oxford, UK
- Burial place: St Kenelm's Church, Enstone
- Education: Durham University (BA); Oxford University (BLitt)
- Spouse: Lubka Kolessa
- Children: 1 son
- Relatives: Francis ffolkes, 5th Baronet
- Military career
- Allegiance: United Kingdom
- Branch: British Army
- Rank: Captain
- Conflicts: First World War: Battle of Bukoba; Battle of Tabora; Arab Revolt; Capture of Jerusalem
- Awards: Military Cross; Knight of the Order of Leopold (Belgium)

James Erasmus Tracy Philipps (Note: Philipps' name was inconsistently recorded during his life. He was known as Edward John Tracy Philipps as a schoolboy at Abingdon and Marlborough, while his birthname was apparently James Edward Tracy Philipps. He seems to have adopted the middle name Erasmus (common among men of the Philipps family) at a later date, and was using it by the time he graduated from Durham University in 1910.) MC FRAI FRGS (20 November 1888 (Note: A birth year of 1890 is what Philipps himself claimed in later Who's Who entries, which is repeated in some secondary sources. However, there is evidence to suggest Philipps, for whatever reason, began to state a different date regarding his date of birth. In earlier editions of Who's Who Philipps insisted he was born in 1888 (example: the 1926 Who's Who), which is supported by the 1905 and 1952 editions of the Marlborough College Register – a publication that recorded the biographical details of all those who entered the school) – 21 July 1959) was a British public servant. Philipps was, in various guises, a soldier, colonial administrator, traveller, journalist, propagandist, conservationist, and secret agent. He served as a British Army intelligence officer in the East African and Middle Eastern theatre of the First World War, which led to brief stints in journalism and relief work in the aftermath of the Greco-Turkish War. Joining the Colonial Office, his reform-minded agenda as a District Commissioner in Colonial Uganda alienated superiors and soon resulted in the termination of his position.

He worked as a foreign correspondent for The Times in Eastern Europe, and spent much of the Second World War in Canada attempting to build support among ethnic minorities for British war objectives. Following a frustrating experience helping to resettle displaced persons as a United Nations Relief and Rehabilitation Administration official, and Cold War propaganda activities with the secretive Information Research Department, Philipps' attention was increasingly taken up by his longstanding interest in conservation.

In the final years of his life he led efforts to create African National Parks as Secretary-General of the International Union for Conservation of Nature. The product of an old, upper-class family, Philipps possessed determination and high self-esteem as well as a great deal of ambition – though his personal eccentricity sometimes undermined his goals.

== Early life ==
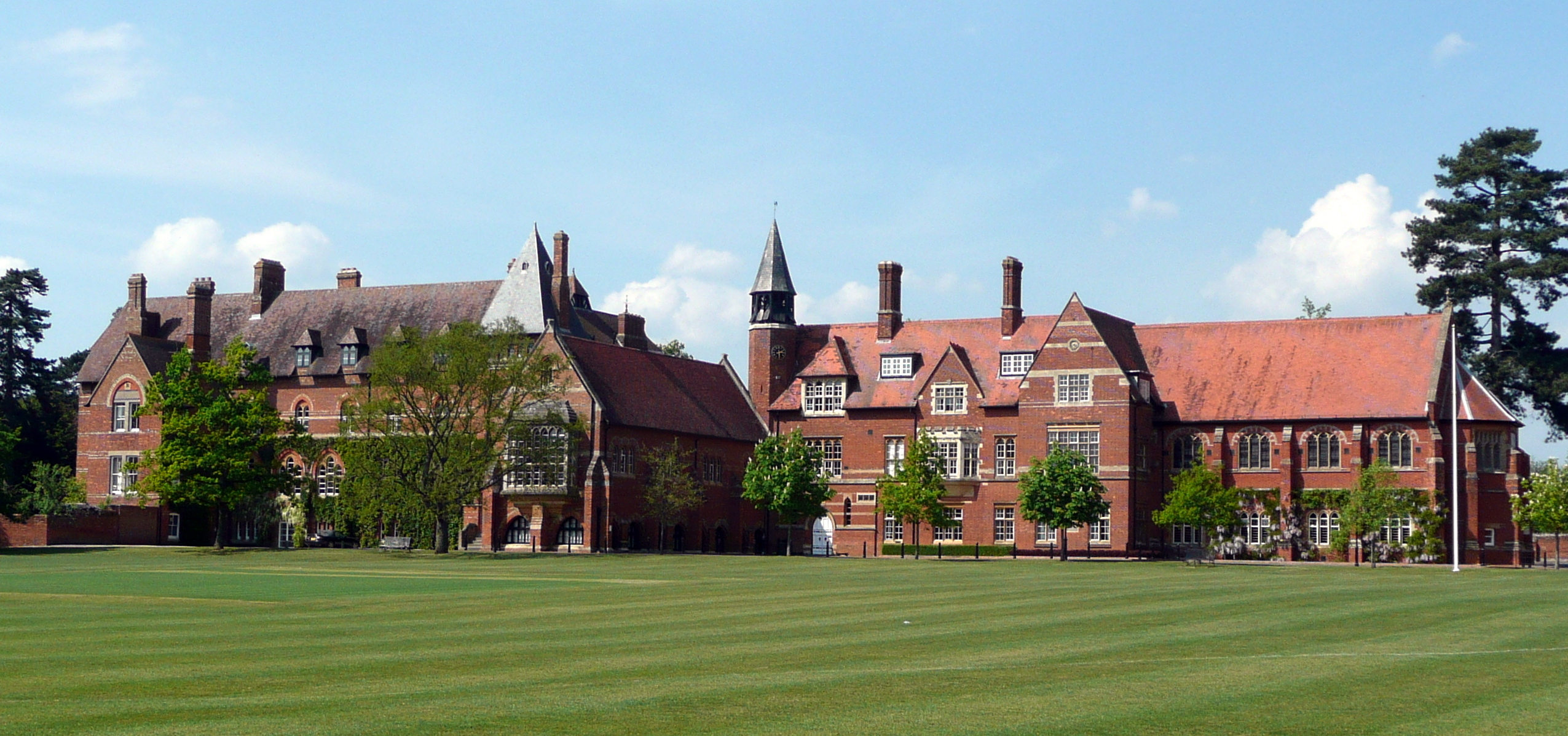
Abingdon School, where Philipps was a pupil

Philipps as a young man

Tracy Philipps was the only child of the Rev. John Erasmus Philipps, originally from Haverfordwest in Pembrokeshire, and Margaret Louisa Everard (née ffolkes). The elder Philipps had been vicar of Wiston in Pembrokeshire, and later held curacies in Enstone in Oxfordshire and Staindrop in County Durham, where he was domestic chaplain to the 9th Baron Barnard. After his death in 1923 his widow Margaret married Harold Dillon, 17th Viscount Dillon. Tracy was born in Hillington, Norfolk, the traditional home of his wife's family.

The younger Philipps enrolled at Abingdon School in May 1899. From September 1904 he boarded at Marlborough College, and left in December 1906. At Marlborough he played as a forward in inter-house rugby matches. In February 1907 he was one of a few dozen Old Marlburians accepted for membership of the Marlburian Club alumni association after a meeting of the club committee held in Old Queen Street, Westminster.

According to the Christmas 1907 edition of The Abingdonian magazine Philipps was still undecided about which university he would attend but was nonetheless 'endeavouring to obtain a scholarship at Jesus, Cambridge' – an effort that was ultimately unsuccessful. For university he is said to have eventually studied at Oxford for a period of time, although sources on this are unclear. (Note: Primary sources, such as the obituaries that appeared in The Times and The Geographical Journal, only refer to his education at Durham University. Accounts of his life (e.g. Caccia 2006) mention an Oxford degree (a BLitt when specified) but base this claim on the (self-reported) entry in Who's Who) What is known for certain is that he entered Durham University in 1910. Like his father and uncle, he was a member of Hatfield Hall and graduated in 1912 with a Bachelor of Arts degree in Classics. He was Secretary of Durham University Boat Club in 1911. He also served as President of the Durham Union for Epiphany term of 1912, and was Editor of The Sphinx – a student magazine with a lighthearted tone – in addition to participating in the Officers' Training Corps.

As the President of the Union during the seventieth anniversary of its foundation, he chaired an inter-varsity debate held on Saturday 16 March 1912 at the Great Hall of University College, which featured teams from Oxford, Cambridge, Trinity College, Dublin, and Edinburgh University. (Note: Two of Philipps' old classmates at Marlborough, F. Kingsley Griffith and Humfrey Grose-Hodge, by now Presidents of the Oxford Union and Cambridge Union respectively, also participated. As noted by Bertie Dockerill, this is the only time that all three presidents of the debating societies at England's 'older universities' have been so intimately linked.)

== Early career ==
=== First World War ===
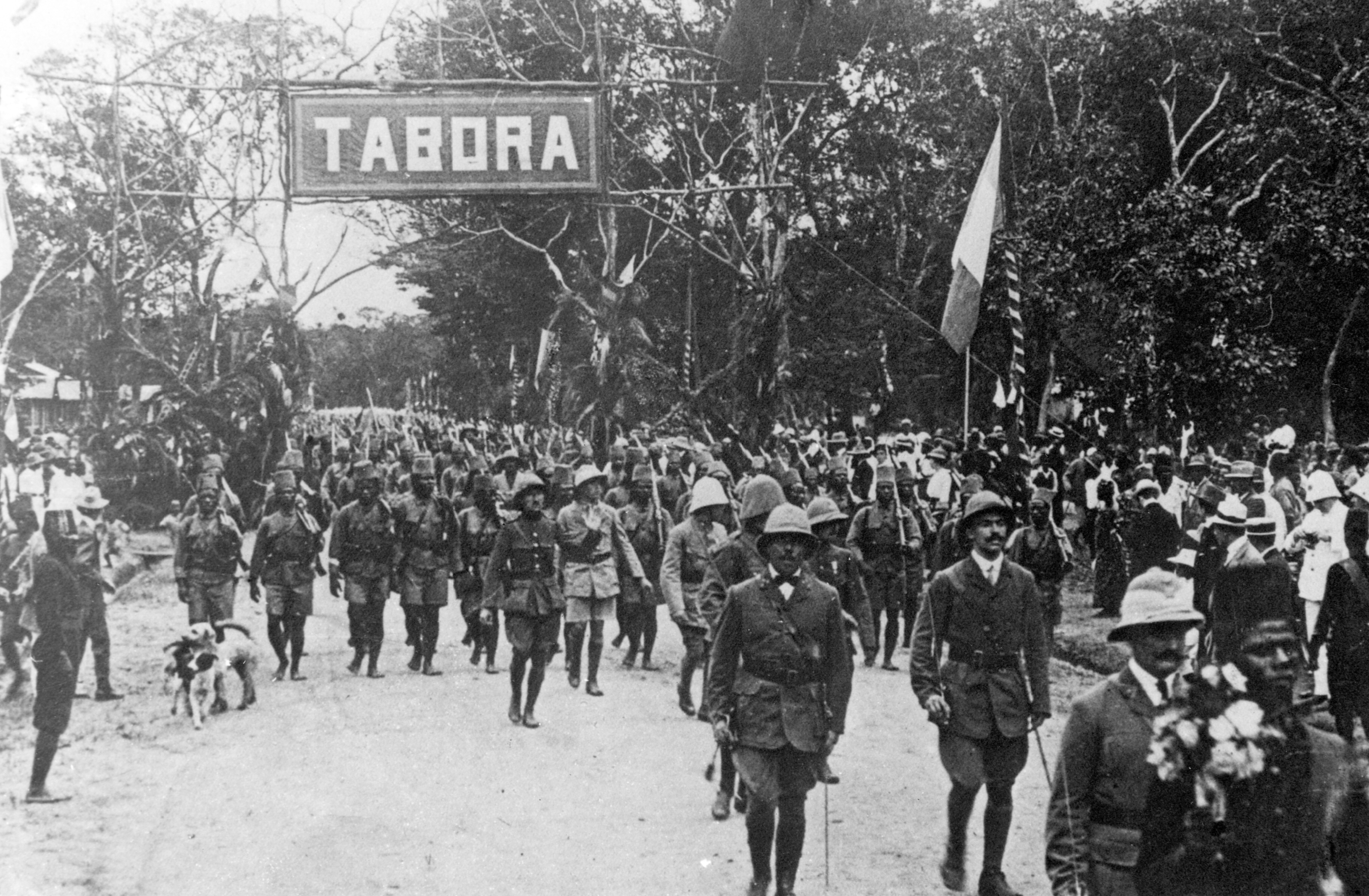
Belgian troops march into Tabora after the surrender of the city.

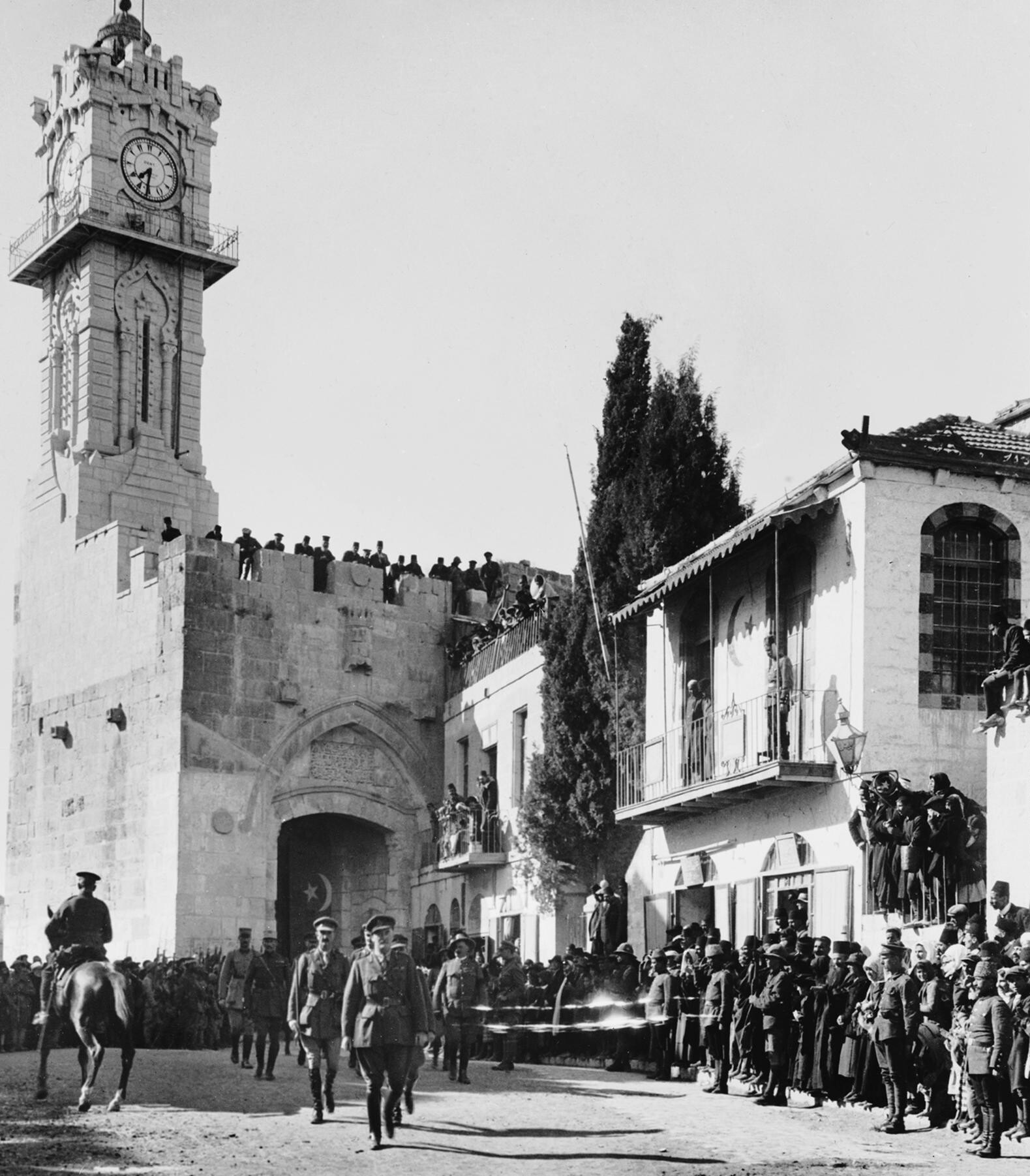
The Capture of Jerusalem in 1917

After his time in the Officers' Training Corps at Durham, Philipps made his position in the British Army official. He was gazetted as a 2nd Lieutenant in the Infantry in February 1913. He joined the Rifle Brigade but was soon sent to East Africa on secondment in an intelligence role. When the First World War broke out he was on attachment to the Kings African Rifles (KAR) and was "one of the first Englishmen in action" when the war in Africa started in August 1914. Serving temporarily with the Indian Expeditionary Force B as an assistant intelligence officer alongside Richard Meinertzhagen, he was involved in the disastrous Battle of Tanga. He was later wounded while serving with the KAR (for which he was mentioned in despatches) and also present as a political officer at the Battle of Bukoba (serving as part of the hastily formed Uganda Intelligence Department) in June 1915. The next year Philipps was awarded a promotion to captain, effective from 17 January 1916. With the newly formed Lake Force he took part in the Tabora Offensive (April – September 1916) and in the aftermath was awarded the Military Cross, gazetted February 1917, which he received for actions in conjunction with an intelligence section of the Belgian Force Publique. From November 1916 to March 1917, Philipps, by now the chief political officer for the Uganda region, was based in Ruanda-Urundi, a part of German East Africa recently captured by the Belgians.

A September 1917 entry in The London Gazette noted that Philipps relinquished his Army commission earlier in the year, with no explanation provided. This decision was due to injury: his entry in the 1951 Who's Who describes being 'invalided', indicating wounds had rendered him unfit for further duty, and is further confirmed by a letter sent by Philipps to Reginald Wingate which suggests he had returned to Britain in March. Philipps quickly recovered and restored his commission: he was employed at the War Office in London with the Intelligence Staff, June–August 1917; then was similarly employed at the Admiralty, August–October 1917. By November 1917 he was in Abyssinia on a mission to investigate the extent of the slave trade. The next month he was reportedly present at the Capture of Jerusalem. In 1918 he began a posting at the Arab Bureau (a section of the Cairo Intelligence Department), operating as an intelligence officer at their headquarters in Cairo. This was a role generally based in Cairo, with spells in Palestine and Syria, working alongside Lawrence of Arabia in the final campaigns of the Arab Revolt. His work with the Bureau was interrupted by his taking part in a military expedition against the Turkana people (April–June 1918), who lived on the fringes of British East Africa and were notorious for raiding cattle.

At some time either shortly before or shortly after the conclusion of the war, he left the bureau to serve on attachment to the British Embassy in Rome. He also spent time with the British Legation in Athens. Years later, in February 1922, The London Gazette reported that Philipps, by now a captain in the Special List, was one of a number of British officers from the war who had been awarded the Belgian Order of Leopold.

=== Aftermath ===
Prince Wilhelm of Sweden, who journeyed across Africa with Philipps

Philipps returned to Africa and served as acting district commissioner in Kigezi District in Uganda from 1919 through 1920. One of his challenges was the threat posed by the Nyabinghi cult, popular with the Kiga people of Southern Uganda, and highly resistant to British rule. After cult leader Ntokibiri was killed by a posse, Philipps ordered that the head of Ntokibiri be sent to Entebbe as proof that the threat had been eliminated. Philipps worked to end the use of Baganda agents in areas populated by the Kiga and discouraged the use of the Luganda language in courts, instead introducing the Swahili language, which the Baganda people could not speak. In February 1920 Philipps briefly returned to Durham where he gave a public lecture on 'The Pygmies of East Central Africa', illustrated with slides, at Durham Town Hall.

The following year he travelled on foot across Equatorial Africa, taking a circuitous route from east to west. On the way he discovered Lutra Paraonyx Philippsi, (Aonyx capensis philippsi (Hinton 1921)),a subspecies of the African clawless otter that he recorded for science and had named after himself. For one month he was joined by Prince Wilhelm of Sweden, whom Philipps helped to obtain photographs of pygmies and specimens of gorilla for the Swedish Museum of Natural History. As reported in The Morning Bulletin, Philipps had a caravan party of approximately 50 men for the seven-month journey, including two tribal chiefs lent to him by colonial authorities, Philippo Lwengoga and Benedikto Daki, who proved to be crucial in the success of the journey.

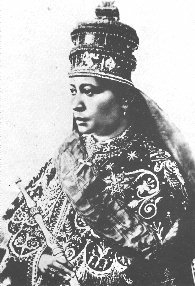
Empress Zewditu of Ethiopia

Detouring into Abyssinia, Philipps stumbled upon a slave market, where he saw a 'half-caste auctioneer' selling young girls to the highest bidder. He was able to buy off the girl in the worst condition, who had been nearly beaten to death, and had her sent to a Christian mission. In Addis Ababa he encountered the Empress Zewditu, describing her as 'short and handsome, with a mass of barbaric robes encrusted with gold and jewels' and having 'black, rather curly hair' In the aftermath of the journey, Philipps took Lwengoga and Daki with him to London, where the trio visited the Zoological Society Gardens. The two Africans were reportedly astonished to see a zookeeper approach and feed an African Elephant without any fear.

Philipps was assigned by Lord Halifax – who had recently been appointed Under-Secretary for the Colonies – to report on the activities of the 2nd Pan-African Congress, which was hosting several meetings in London, Brussels and Paris during August and September. During this mission he would meet W. E. B. DuBois, the organiser of the Congress and an American sociologist and Pan-Africanism advocate. Following the Paris conference, Philipps contacted Du Bois to seek a lunch meeting in London, specifically at The Holborn Restaurant, 129 Kingsway. Du Bois was unable to attend because he left Europe at the start of the month, but requested copies of any future articles that Philipps published, thus establishing a long-term correspondence between the two.

With the Famine in Russia intensifying, Philipps travelled to Constantinople, then Moscow, as part of the International Committee for Russian Relief (ICRR) led by explorer Fridtjof Nansen. He then took a brief detour into journalism when he reported on the Greco-Turkish War for The Times newspaper. He may have decided to follow Nansen to Ottoman Turkey, who was in the country to negotiate the resettlement of Greek refugees. While stationed in Turkey he assumed the role of supply commissioner for the famine relief operation organised by the British Red Cross under the auspices of the League of Nations and Nansen's International Committee for Russian Relief (ICRR). This allowed him to travel through the Ukrainian and Russian countryside and become familiar with the people and their traditions, but also developed a permanent resentment of the Soviet system. He later reported seeing the remains of victims of human cannibalism.

== Colonial Service ==
=== 1923–1930 ===
From 1923 to 1925 Philipps was in Khartoum, occupying a position within the Sudan Political Service. In a letter written from Khartoum in November 1923 to the Labour Party politician Ben Spoor, Philipps related he was on a posting with the Colonial Office, arranged 'through the War Office', for a two-year period. Historian Bohdan S. Kordan described this job as being 'deputy director of intelligence' for Anglo-Egyptian Sudan.

In the same letter to Spoor, Philipps reports a journey to Europe that may also be connected to intelligence gathering. He describes being on leave in the Balkans during the Summer of 1923: in Croatia, he stayed with Stjepan Radić, the leader of the Croatian People's Peasant Party, shortly before the latter left on an overseas trip. He moved to Bulgaria and met the Prime Minister Aleksandar Stamboliyski 'about ten days' before Stamboliyski was assassinated on 14 June.

Following his experience in Sudan he pursued a full-time career in the Colonial Service in East Africa, where as a 'self-appointed scourge of the wicked' according to John Tosh, he exposed abuses and advocated for reform. He spent much of this period back in the Kigezi District of Uganda, where he was known for his energy as an administrator – attempting to develop native industries in iron smelting and using the sisal plant to make rope – and paying for many supplies out of his own pocket.

During his time in Africa he was fond of exploring the tropical forests and writing his observations on the wildlife he encountered. In 1930, he met Julian Huxley in the forests of Western Uganda whilst accompanying entomologists on a scientific mission. His experiences led him to become an early advocate of the creation of large national parks in Equatorial Africa, believing that human encroachment on gorilla habitats engendered aggressive behaviour.

=== 1931–1935 ===
Philipps' career in the Colonial Service began to be interrupted by health problems. He had already spent part of 1931 back in England recuperating at Ditchley (the home of his father-in-law the Viscount Dillon) after a 'terrible ordeal' in Africa made worse through incompetent care provided by missionaries. By January 1932, having again fallen unwell the previous year, he was on leave for health reasons at the clinic of Auguste Rollier in Leysin, Switzerland. He noted in a letter to an American friend, Charles Francis de Ganahl, that his temperature had gone down and he had gained 16 pounds (7.3 kg) in weight, having 'dropped from 13 to 7 stone', (Note: Stones are an imperial unit of mass used commonly in Britain and Ireland to denote body weight. 1 stone is equal to 14 pounds, or 6.35 kg) or 98 pounds (44 kg), the previous month. Since he was no longer in an assigned position in Africa, he considered seeking a transfer to somewhere in the Near East. Writing to de Ganahl from Clarens in April 1932, Philipps described being allowed to temporarily 'descend from Léysin's icy mountains into the cities of the plain' but could still only 'hobble about rather painfully' – nevertheless he mentioned plans to visit Corfu and Ithaca, having booked passage on a cargo ship leaving Venice on 1 May.

Despite thoughts about going elsewhere, Philipps returned to Africa. His last assignment was as District Commissioner of the Lango District in Uganda. Philips was removed from duty after disagreeing with the governor on colonial administration: he argued that the policy of 'indirect rule' (devolution of responsibility to native chiefs) brought out rampant corruption among the chiefs in power at the expense of the ordinary native population. Towards the end of 1933 he had submitted several highly critical reports concerning the quality of native administration, having chosen to bypass native courts during his inquiries and encouraged the local peasantry to submit their grievances to himself.

He was replaced as District Commissioner in March 1934 and, under protest, forcibly retired from the Colonial Office the following year. Tosh noted that although his superiors agreed with many of his findings, because Philipps was by now associated with an 'anti-chief' mindset, the colonial authorities thought carrying out reform would be harder if Philipps was still in place. The verdict of Bernard Bourdillon, then Governor of Uganda, was that Philipps was a "brilliant man" who "did not exactly fit into Colonial administration".

== Diplomatic Correspondent, 1936–1939 ==
In 1936 Philipps began working as a foreign correspondent in Eastern Europe and Turkey. He is known to have spent at least part of 1936 in Berlin, where he wrote a letter to the historian Arnold J. Toynbee concerning the local response to Toynbee's controversial private interview with Adolf Hitler, noting that it was "an eager topic of discussion everywhere".

That decade he also married the pianist Lubka Kolessa. A July 1939 notice in The Times reported that the pair had married in Prague on 14 March, the eve of the German occupation of the country. Kolessa gave birth to a son, Igor (John), in Marylebone, London that same year.

In 1938 Philipps travelled to South America with Kolessa, where he acted as manager for his wife's concert tour. The tour traveled to Brazil, Argentina, Chile, and Uruguay and conducted 178 live performances. While in South America, he investigated the colonies developed by the Jewish Colonization Association to discover if they would be viable places to resettle the increasingly vulnerable Jewish population of Europe. In a 1939 letter to The Times he objected to the argument made by Chaim Weizmann that the "Hirsch Jewish land settlements" were unsuitable places for the "unwanted Jewish Germans and Jewish Poles" and wrote that, based on his own recent observations, they were in a "state of renaissance". A report on Philipps' visit was collected by the Foreign Office.

=== Visits to Rome ===
By October 1938 Philipps was in Rome, having been invited as one of the British delegates at that year's Volta Conference, where colonial policy was discussed. Recounting his experiences in an article printed in the Journal of the Royal African Society, he revealed that part of the hospitality provided was a trip to Italian Libya (the Governor-General, Marshal Balbo, was participating at the conference), and was impressed by what had been achieved by the mass migration of Italian settlers. Philipps himself spoke during the 16th session, on the afternoon of the final day of the conference, on ways in which shared participation and common goals in Africa could avert the path to war in Europe. He suggested to delegates that if the European powers could develop Africa 'as a field of opportunity, equal guarantee, and equal rights for all the nations of the European family' this could have the effect of 'resolidarising' Europeans in Europe itself. Essentially, Philipps was in favour of 're-admitting Germany as a partner at the table where tropical riches were to be re-distributed' in the hope this would avoid conflict in Europe.

Philipps was once again in Rome (Note: Ivana Caccia (2006) notes that 'Half of Philipps' family was apparently Catholics and he had relatives living in Rome where he stayed with them occasionally') in June 1939 to attend a conference held by the International Colonial Institute. He was one of the two British representatives – the other being Henry Gollan. The conference, chaired by Luigi Federzoni, was on three subjects, namely 'the nutrition of "Natives"', the 'juridical situation of "Native" women' and the 'financial contribution of "Natives" to the expenses of administration'. An italophile, Philipps enjoyed the luncheon arranged by Federzoni and Attilio Teruzzi, which was held outside in the shady surroundings of the Villa Borghese gardens, and praised the efforts of the workers involved in the reclamation of the Pontine Marshes:

'The Members of the Institut have lived to see the Pontine Marshes thick with corn. Love for the peasant people of Italy has been felt by every Englishman who has lived among them. Whatever our views, few will wish to deny that the maker of modern Italy has also been animated and energised by cette parcelle d'amour sans laquelle il ne se fond rien de grand.’ (Note: Translated from French: 'this parcel of love without which nothing great can be achieved')

— "The XXIVth Biennial Session of the Institut Colonial International, Rome, June 1939", Journal of the Royal African Society, 1940, p. 18

=== The Ukrainian Question ===
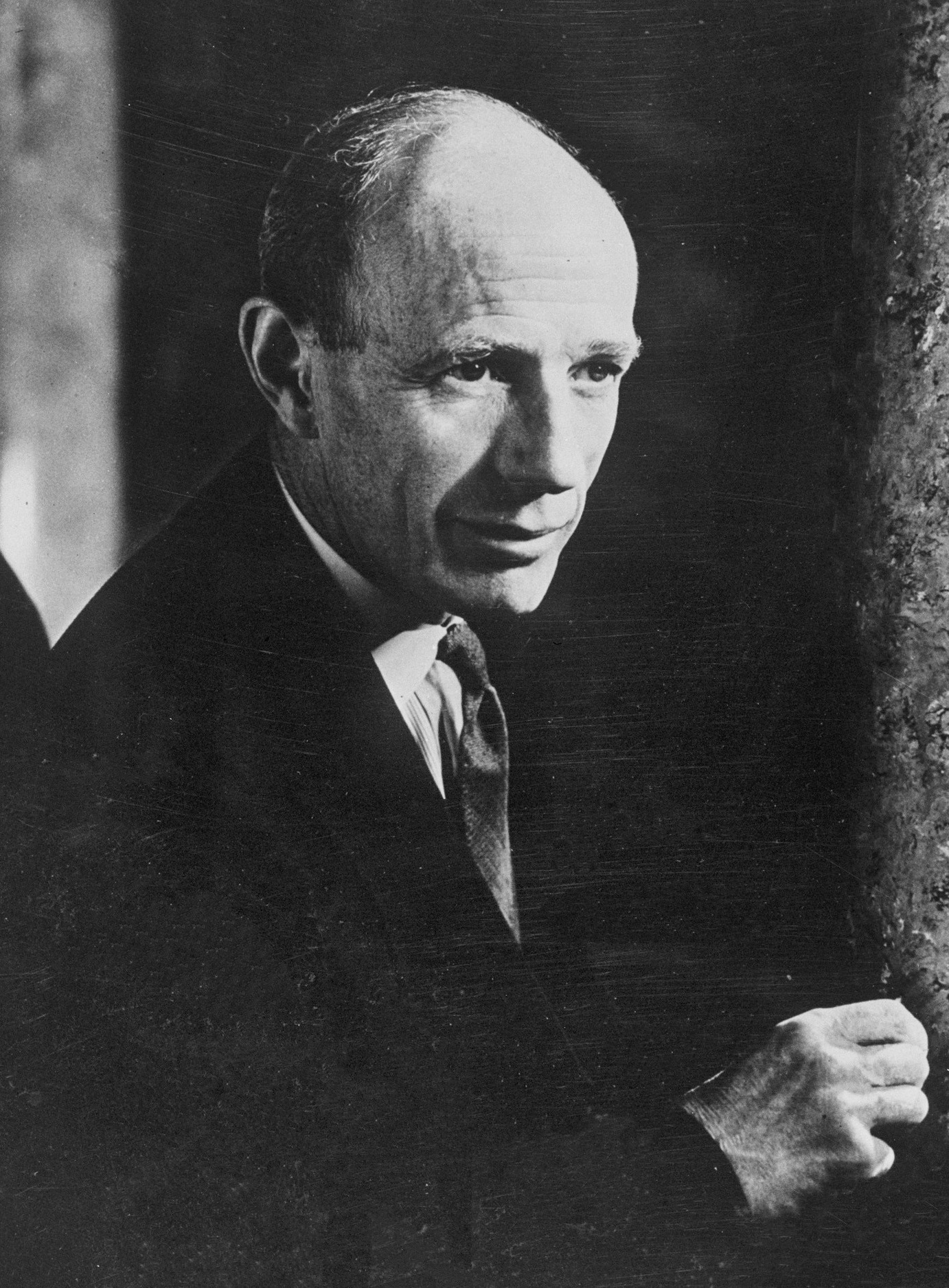
Lord Halifax, who had a close relationship with Philipps

During the 1930s Philipps became friendly with the Ukrainian Bureau, a lobbying centre formed in 1931 in London by Ukrainian-American Jacob Makohin to advocate for Ukrainian nationhood, promote the interests of Ukrainian minorities, and provide an outlet for information on Ukrainian issues that stood outside the Soviet sphere of influence. On several occasions in the 1930s he visited Ukraine and Russia (especially the latter) in the guise of a newspaper correspondent and thus kept up-to-date with political developments in these countries, though his motivation for travel may have been intelligence gathering rather than any duties as a journalist.

Officials in the Foreign Office during this period were not as sympathetic as Philipps to the claims of Ukrainian nationalists, owing to a desire to avoid offending Poland and the Soviet Union, and did not think it worthwhile to press the Polish government over its annexation of Eastern Galicia in the aftermath of the Polish-Ukrainian War (1918–1919). Reports of atrocities committed by the Polish government during the Pacification of Ukrainians in Eastern Galicia were collected and noted, but not acted upon. Whitehall civil servants concluded they could not encourage 'a movement of national liberation which we could in no circumstances support in anything but words' – effectively Britain's answer to the 'Ukrainian Question' during the interwar period. This disappointed lobbyists like Arnold Margolin, a Jewish Ukrainian lawyer, who insisted British failure to make promises of assistance to the Ukrainian cause would guarantee Ukrainians falling for the overtures of Nazi Germany in any upcoming war.

While the British government was not motivated to intervene itself, it was still concerned with the designs of other European powers. British officials worried that Germany might strengthen itself by aligning with Ukrainian national aspirations before launching a conflict with the Soviet Union. Towards the end of 1938, Philipps' mentor Lord Halifax, by now Foreign Secretary, was being told that the 'Ukrainian question seems likely to boil up' very soon. Any such German plan would, however, require driving a wedge through Polish-held territory in order to reach Soviet Ukraine, something Poland was very unlikely to agree to. Consequently, some British analysts began to feel war between Germany and Poland was unavoidable, though Lord Halifax was also informed by experts that because the Poles would be unwilling to allow the Germans to move across their territory without a fight, Hitler would probably deploy his forces to the west first – a prediction that would turn out to be inaccurate.

In 1939, in the aftermath of the British guarantee to Poland, Philipps, armed with briefs prepared for him by Vladimir Kysilewsky (Director of the Ukrainian Bureau) and vetted by the historian Robert William Seton-Watson, had lengthy conversations with Lord Halifax. According to Canadian historian Orest T. Martynowych, Philipps was seen as highly useful to the Ukrainian cause due to his "extensive personal and family connections in high places".

== Mission to Canada, 1940–1944 ==
With the outbreak of the Second World War Philipps was eager to do something for his country, but carried injuries from the First World War that prevented him from rejoining the military. He claimed to be "ashamed to seem to be doing so very little" in a letter he wrote to Lord Halifax.

The calling card of Tracy Philipps

Philipps disembarked in Montreal with his wife and son in June 1940, carrying letters of introduction from Lord Halifax. Used to high-living, he was furious with Thomas Cook agents for being assigned a second-class cabin and made his disgust known upon arrival. He had been sent to Canada as one of many propagandists, part of a Ministry of Information project to shape North American public opinion in favour of British war objectives. The Fall of France and a series of British reverses, leading to the evacuation of British forces from Dunkirk, made ensuring ongoing Canadian support vital. Philipps was specifically tasked with monitoring the viewpoints of minority groups in Canada, some of which were fascist in nature, and could potentially undermine the British war effort. The United Hetman Organization (UHO), a Ukrainian monarchist group led by Pavlo Skoropadskyi, was identified as the gravest concern due to its contacts in Berlin.

He soon began travelling across Canada on a mission to gauge the loyalty of the foreign-born labour force, in the process sending various unsolicited reports to the mystified Canadian Deputy Minister of War Services T. C. Davis. He also reported regularly to Lord Halifax on various matters, including the reception of British evacuees in Canada and the possibility of evacuating the British government to Ottawa in the event of an expected German invasion. As fears of a German invasion grew, the British upper-classes rushed to secure evacuation berths for wives, children and servants. On this matter Philipps wrote to Lord Halifax in July on the assimilation of British children into Canadian homes; having already provided assistance to his cousin, Elsbeth Dimsdale, on planning the evacuation of her children.

Philipps' travels across Canada have been described as a "frenetic itinerary of public speaking and factory inspections". Towards the public he maintained the pretense that he was in North America purely to go on a public speaking tour that had been arranged in advance under the auspices of the National Council of Education. He spoke to business clubs, local clubs, and the Canadian Institute of International Affairs and lectured on the Near East and Eastern Europe in the aftermath of the Molotov–Ribbentrop Pact. While on this tour he was invited by organisers to give lectures to local immigrant groups on current events in Europe, and used this tour to relay information on the views of the European immigrant population in Canada to the British government. Ukrainians were of particular concern: they were divided into multiple organisations and did not agree on the political future of their homeland. Philipps himself was pleased with the reception he received from immigrant communities in the more remote parts of Canada, comparing it to what he had witnessed with Lawrence of Arabia among the Arab rebels during the Great War. Officials, perhaps sensitive to the hidden purpose of his "public speaking tour", denied Philipps had any connection with the Foreign Office.

In April 1941, Davis offered Philipps the role of Director of the European Section the Royal Canadian Mounted Police (RCMP) on a temporary basis, tasked with him helping to build unity behind the war effort amongst Canadian immigrant communities. His first major assignment was a trip to the United States to find out what was being done in that country to promote integration of the immigrant ethnic population, and how these communities regarded the federal authorities. He visited many cities on this tour, including Pittsburgh, Chicago, Atlanta and Washington, D. C.; sending detailed memoranda to his new superior Commissioner Stuart Wood from "virtually every stop" on his route. Philipps' extravagances, which included expenses claims for first-class rail travel and valet services, caused concerns with the frugal RCMP as he made his way across Canada and the United States to interview foreign-born workers. On the other hand, his suggestion of radio broadcasts to influence immigrant populations met with the approval of Commissioner Wood.

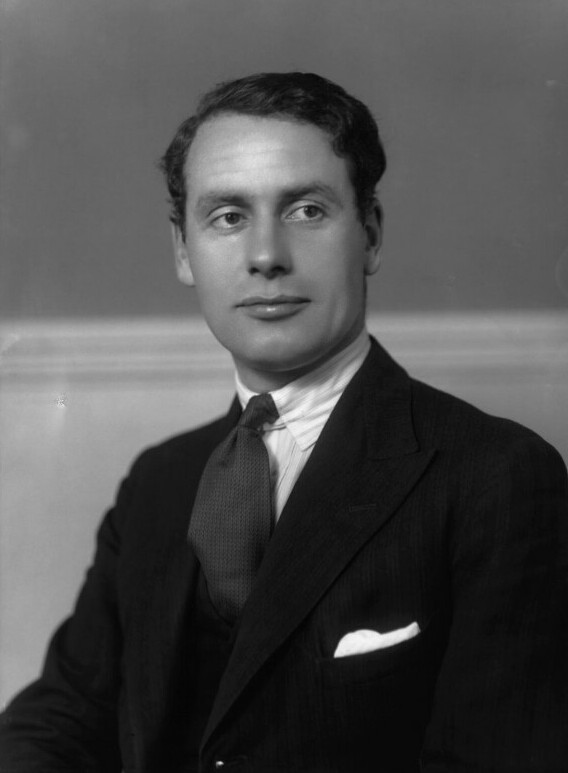
British High Commissioner Malcolm MacDonald

In Atlanta he briefly interrupted his duties with the RCMP to attend W. E. B. Du Bois' First Phylon Conference at Fisk University. Asked by Du Bois to set out what effective decolonisation would look like, he suggested the British system of parliamentary democracy would be unsuitable for Africa due to the tribal loyalties of Africans. Following the conference, he reported to Gerald Campbell, his contact in the British Embassy to Washington, that his talk prompted "numerous questions"; these were generally hostile, which Philipps blamed on misrepresentation from communist sources.

On his return journey to Canada he briefly visited New York and met with Michael Huxley at the Inter-Allied Information Committee on the fifth floor of the Rockefeller Center. Huxley was the director of this white propaganda outfit, launched in 1940 to win American support for Britain by casting British war aims in light of a new "internationalism" – intended to counteract American suspicions that Britain's true aim was to preserve its empire. Philipps was there to seek Huxley's views on a proposal of Count Vladislav Radziwill to have Poles trained in Canada for sabotage missions in occupied Poland. Huxley replied that he was "not competent to respond" and any suggestions from Philipps should be directed to Malcolm MacDonald, the High Commissioner to Canada. Huxley regarded Philipps with caution, and the latter would leave unaware of British Security Co-ordination (BSC), a covert black propaganda outfit, operating from the very same building in support of British interests. Philipps may have been left "in the dark" by Huxley as he had already earned a reputation with British officials in Canada for straying beyond his remit by sending intelligence reports on matters that had nothing to do with the foreign-born labour force, which irritated his superior MacDonald. In any case, his "explicit valorization of the old British Empire" was not in keeping with the internationalist rhetoric British intelligence was keen to project.

=== Nationalities Branch ===
After completing his work with the RCMP, he continued as an adviser to the Canadian Government on immigrant European communities, working to increase the loyalty of "new Canadians" at the newly formed Nationalities Branch. Also joining him was Vladimir Kysilewsky – the old Director of the Ukrainian Bureau in London – who would continue to be a close confidant in Ottawa. He became friendly with Oliver Mowat Biggar, the Director of Censorship. Philipps also received intelligence from Bermuda, where his cousin Charles des Graz was Director of Imperial Censorship.

Nevertheless, his period with the Canadian Government was less successful than his spell with the RCMP. The Ukrainian Canadian Committee (UCC) – an attempt at bringing ethnic Ukrainians in Canada under a single body (which later developed into the Ukrainian Canadian Congress) – was successfully established after two days of intense negotiations in Winnipeg. However, its anti-communist nature, achieved by sidelining the communist elements during the negotiations, proved to be less useful once the Germans launched Operation Barbarossa in the summer of 1941 and Canada, alongside the rest of the British Empire, was allied with the Soviet Union. (Note: Watson Kirkconnell, an ally of Philipps, would later justify this decision by arguing that the sidelining of the Communist faction was both inevitable and politically sound given they were a "seditious organization" with no real loyalty or gratitude to Canada.) Philipps had, by the time of the formation of the UCC, already become known in Canada for his sympathy towards the idea of Ukrainian independence, earning him the permanent distrust of Ukrainian-Canadians with communist leanings.

Beyond assuring the loyalties of ethnic Ukrainians in Canada he also hoped his efforts would help cement a British-Ukrainian alliance that would stand against Nazi Germany and the Soviet Union. As far as he was concerned, Ukrainian nationhood was not only morally right, but, given the guarantee that the British government had previously made to Poland, politically fair and logical.

For Philipps, the key principle of the Allies was a belief in political self-determination, which made a failure to support Ukraine inconceivable. Such support, he argued, would surely reflect well on both Britain's war aims and her moral reputation:

"From the day of the British guarantee to Poland, it has been clear that the Ukrainians are the main key to the relations between the Russians' and the Prussians' empires who are allied against us. The reality of these relations is vital to us. If our declarations are true, then no new promise is necessary for Ukrainians. If we have the courage to be clear and to dissipate doubts of the clarity and sincerity of our declarations, which in the last war did our reputation so much deadly damage among the peoples of the Near East, such as the Jews and Arabs, Bulgars (Neuilly) and Turks (Sevres), we shall not have to make voluminous reports about Ukrainians as potential enemies or at least as doubtful friends."

He thought it wrong for Britain to make any guarantees of Ukrainian sovereignty it could not keep, but, as the war was apparently being fought for the right of nations to organise themselves, believed the Allies would eventually have to face up to this principle. Before the launch of Operation Barbarossa he had suggested that recognition of Ukrainian sovereignty might also be strategically necessary – fearing that Nazi Germany would make overtures to nationalist Ukrainians in exchange for military assistance in a future conflict against the Soviet Union. He worried that Hitler might offer the Ukrainians —

"a Danish-type independence" ... something far more advanced than their present political serfdom under Moscow. If he were successful, he could draw from fifty million Ukrainians labourers and soldiers both to develop and protect Ukraine. So far there has been no response. For the British peoples, the logical development would spell misfortune ... If, in Europe, Ukrainians have no hope of any other support, it is not unreasonable to suppose that the German proposition will at least receive careful consideration."

This belief in the self-determination of Ukraine was not shared by the government in London, who wished to maintain normal relations with the Soviet Union, and had shown no appetite to prejudice relations even at the height of the state-sponsored Great Famine in 1933.

While working at the Nationalities Branch Philipps gravitated towards his old contacts in the RCMP for information and, turning towards the United States, cultivated counterparts in the Federal Bureau of Investigation (FBI), Office of Strategic Services (OSS), and the State Department. Of these, DeWitt Clinton Poole of the OSS was his most regular contact and closest U.S. equivalent. (Note: Poole, a former American spy in Bolshevik Russia, managed day-to-day operations at the Foreign Nationalities Branch of the OSS) Alarmed by contacts reports that "daily Axis short-wave propaganda broadcasts" were influencing foreign-born workers, Philipps repeatedly encouraged the Canadian Broadcasting Corporation (CBC) to introduce its own foreign language broadcasts. Giving in to Philipps' "incessant lobbying", the CBC began producing one fifteen minute programme in Italian, which earned Philipps the thanks of Italian Canadians, but otherwise stuck to its usual schedule of English and French-language broadcasting.

=== Criticism ===
Philipps and his wife had acrimoniously separated shortly after arriving in Ottawa, which hurt his reputation in the capital. By October 1941, as the Nationalities Branch was taking shape, mother and son were living with government press censor Ladislaus Biberovich and his wife. This was the catalyst for an ongoing feud between Philipps and Biberovich. Philipps' efforts in the Nationalities Branch were also damaged by his eccentricity and unorthodox personal style, which proved to be jarring for members of the Canadian establishment. Politicians Louis St. Laurent and Colin Gibson, fellow residents of the Roxborough Apartments, were often ambushed by Philipps, who would roam the corridors in his dressing gown. His position was further weakened by the new Minister of National War Services, General Leo LaFleche. LaFleche, who took an almost instant dislike to Philipps, found him so annoying that he had him barred from his office.

Problems soon emerged for Philipps outside of politics. He suffered a painful back injury after being struck by a toboggan full of children on O'Connor Street during his walk to work. He was also the victim of a stinging character assassination in the autumn of 1942. An article had appeared in a New York paper The Hour (edited by Albert Kahn, a Stalinist agent) – and later reproduced in The New Republic – that accused him of being a Fascist sympathizer. This allegation was founded on his friendships with Lord Halifax, Lady Astor and other members of the controversial Cliveden set. Philipps defended himself in a November letter sent to The Globe and Mail but offered his resignation later that month. He was defended by T. C. Davis, Professor George Simpson of the University of Saskatchewan, and the diplomat Norman Robertson, who successfully argued he was the victim of unfair criticism; and consequently, Philipps would keep his job.

=== Exit ===
This episode forced him to retire from lecturing members of the public, but his distaste for communism continued to interrupt his work. In May 1943 he made a series of anti-Soviet speeches, which drew the ire of John Grierson, the new chairman of the Wartime Information Board. Grierson, determined to undermine both Philipps and the activities of the renegade Nationalities Branch, then started to meet with the Canadian Unity Council, an alliance of ethnic organisations that opposed Philipps. They argued Philipps saw himself as a "guardian" of "helpless and divided" ethnic communities that depended upon him to lead them towards Canadian identity – an attitude they regarded as patronising.

Grierson's efforts would come to nought however, as General LaFleche refused to have Philipps removed despite his personal dislike for the man, or to transfer the Nationalities Branch to Grierson's control. LaFleche felt this would hurt ethnic minority outreach efforts and create an opening that "communist agitators" would take advantage of.

== UNRRA, 1944–1945 ==
In 1944 Philipps successfully lobbied for a role at the United Nations. He was appointed Chief of Planning Resettlement of Displaced Persons with the United Nations Relief and Rehabilitation Administration (UNRRA), working initially from New York, and later Germany.

Philipps quickly became disillusioned by the forced repatriations of Soviet citizens at the conclusion of the war, which came as a consequence of the Yalta Agreement signed by the Allied Powers. He believed that displaced persons were entitled to choose, for political or economic reasons, not to return to their country of origin, and be informed of the consequences of their choice. He did not spend long in his UNRRA job and resigned in 1945. In a letter written in May that year to Watson Kirkconnell he compared the fate of refugees from the Soviet Union to slavery:

"I have had a good deal to do with camps of Soviet subjects, and eventually with the Soviet officers who are gradually sent to 'take care' of them...Those repatriated from Normandy via British ports had often to be battened down below hatches, like the ships plying between Africa and the USA at a certain period."

Writing in his memoirs, Kirkconnell revealed that Philipps was suspicious of the eagerness with which some Allied officials carried out this policy and believed that the "officialdom" of the western Allies was "honeycombed with Communists and fellow-travellers" more than willing to help along the programme. In the same text he stressed how uneasy Philipps was with the ramifications of Yalta, revealing the contents of a 1948 letter from Philipps where he argued the following:

"One of the main dangers of our modern world issues from a common belief that it is right for an individual to approve action by his country (that is, his nation) which, for himself, he would know to be wrong. This nationalist doctrine is dignified as 'a sense of realism'. Call it 'realism' and any dastardy will pass."

Philipps was also critical of certain aspects in how the United Nations was organised, which he felt could "paralyze its actions and effectiveness", namely: the recruitment of staff according to a nationality quota, the use of multiple languages in all its operations, and the veto power of some states, including the Soviet Union.

== Post-war ==
=== Advocacy ===
In 1948 Philipps wrote to the Manchester Guardian to highlight the case of a group of ethnic Ukrainians from Poland who, having been brought to Britain as prisoners of war after being conscripted into the Wehrmacht, were allegedly threatened with deportation to Germany. He claimed the men, sixty among several thousand Ukrainians prisoners in Britain that served in some capacity with the Germans, were sick and set to be shipped to Germany on 12 June; he expressed special concern for a teenage boy who had gone blind and had no friends or relatives in Germany. In another letter sent a month later Philipps reported the affected men had not been deported after all, which he partly attributed to the publicity generated by the first letter, but emphasised the possibility of the men being "quietly shipped off by the July (or subsequent) ship when public opinion is thought to have died down".

Press officer 'J. Cahill' of the Home Office replied a week later. Cahill stated that most Ukrainian prisoners would probably be deported somewhere at a later date (though no final decision had been taken), while a few currently working in agriculture could be given "civilian status" if found to be suitably qualified. He mentioned the difficulty of determining who had volunteered to fight with the Germans and who had done so through coercion. Regarding Philipps' account, Cahill claimed the "story of sixty sick men having been selected for removal to Germany is a canard", that a different set of prisoners had been selected for 12 June, and there was no intention to send the sixty men "on that occasion". Philipps rejected Cahill's reply, which he called "naturally bureaucratic", and reiterated his earlier point that no written assurance had been provided that the affected men would not eventually be deported.

=== Information Research Department ===
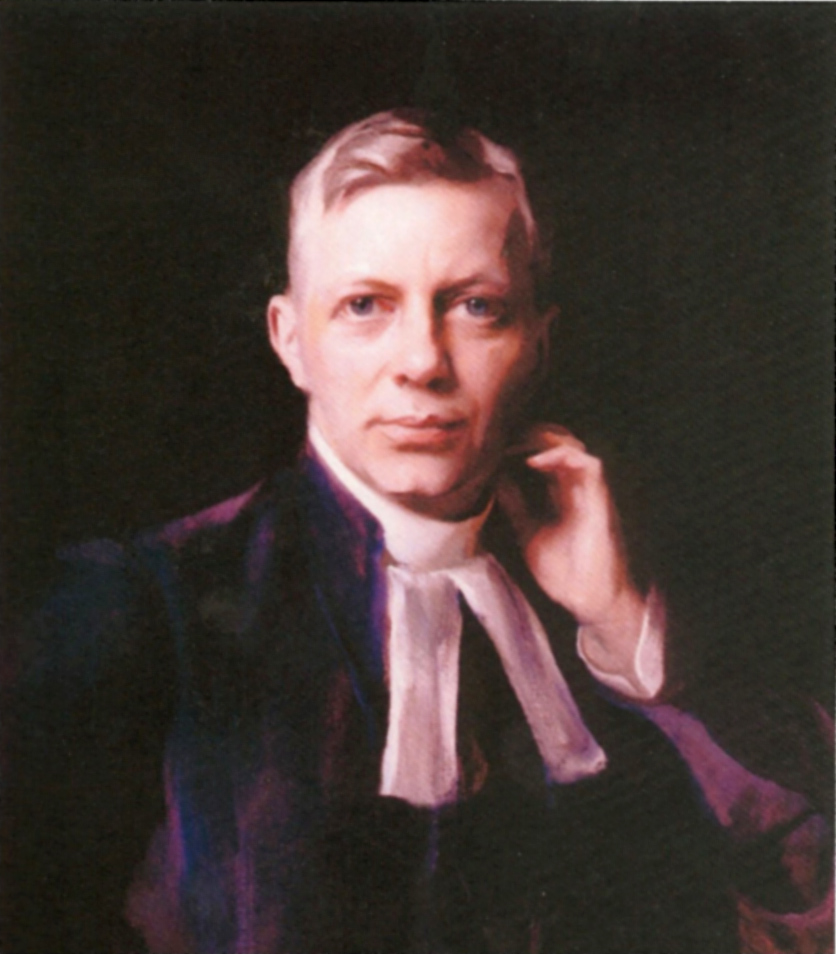
George Bell

In the aftermath of the Second World War Philipps joined the Information Research Department (IRD), a secret branch of the Foreign Office tasked with countering Soviet propaganda in Western Europe. In this role he helped to recruit émigrés from Eastern Europe.

Philipps' work in the IRD was intertwined with his membership of the Church of England Council on Foreign Relations (CFR), an anti-communist outfit whom the IRD collaborated with. Philipps was a member of both organisations. He argued in a 1949 CFR meeting that the persecution of Christians by other Christians (giving one example as the treatment of Protestants in Francoist Spain) should be downplayed, as all Christian groups and regimes needed to be enlisted in the propaganda war against Communism. On 1 December 1952 Philipps was appointed to a "Special Sub-Committee on Information about the Treatment of the Churches in Communist Countries", which explored methods of bringing to public attention the treatment of churches in Eastern Europe by communist authorities.

Alongside journalist Ralph Murray, British Council founder Reg Leeper, Anglican priest Arthur Duncan-Jones, and George Bell, the Bishop of Chichester, he was one of the men behind the 1953 publication of Communist Faith, Christian Faith – a book, edited by Donald Mackinnon, intended to nurture Anglican opposition to Communism. (Note: Essays were contributed by "distinguished British Anglican intellectuals" who had no idea they were part of a propaganda exercise.) He doubted churches in Britain could ever engage constructively with churches in the Soviet bloc during the Cold War, believing that the nature of the Soviet system rendered such efforts a waste of time. Drawing this conclusion in an article for the Quarterly Review, he wrote that "the British Christian can only pray and prepare to be able eventually to appeal in Russia to a more democratically sober civil authority less drunk with power".

=== Conservation ===
Philipps devoted his later years to conservation, and was keen to ensure that countries fast approaching self-government were prepared to conserve their wildlife and natural resources. As an early advocate of animal conservation and the founding of African national parks, he endorsed the creation of sanctuaries to protect the Gorilla population in a 1930 article for The Times. In February 1937 he visited the Swedish doctor Axel Munthe at his home on the island of Capri, the two of them discussing wildfowl conservation, which Philipps had also discussed with the Italian government. He was a long-standing member of the International Commission of the Belgian Research Institute on African National Parks. Writing in 1959, Lord Hurcomb remarked that his interest in Natural History and Zoology had been stimulated by the journey he took across Africa in 1921.

In 1955 he was elected to succeed Jean-Paul Harroy as Secretary-General of the International Union for Conservation of Nature and Natural Resources. He described this role as "the first job in my life that gives me real satisfaction because its aim is of real concern to the future of mankind and our planet". He did not take a salary, as the finances of the Union were in a poor state. He retired at the end of 1958 due to health concerns. Obituaries of Philipps generally highlighted this aspect of his career as opposed to his activities as a soldier and his time in the Colonial Service.

== Personal ==
Philipps, receiving an honorary doctorate from Durham University

Philipps claimed to be descended from Richard Philipps, who was Governor of Nova Scotia from 1717 to 1749, although he was probably descended from the governor's nephew, Erasmus James Philipps, a resident of Annapolis Royal and a member of the Nova Scotia Council from 1730 to 1759. Governor Philipps did not have any children. Philipps met his wife, the Ukrainian pianist Lubka Kolessa, while travelling to Istanbul on the Orient Express, with the pair embarking on a "passionate affair" despite Philipps being considerably older. They moved in together in 1937.

With his frequent travelling, Philipps did not own any property in London and Pall Mall clubs like the Army and Navy and the Travellers were effectively his 'residence' in the city.

In 1937 he received the honorary degree of Doctor of Civil Law from Durham University. According to Luther Evans, Philipps also held honorary awards from the Sorbonne, the University of Tehran, Al-Azhar University in Cairo, and the Accademia dei Lincei in Rome.

A skilled linguist, he was conversant in up to 14 African languages and also fluent in Russian and Turkish.

== Views ==
=== Politics ===
Philipps was a member of the Conservative Party, and pessimistic regarding what became known in Britain as the Post-war consensus, feeling that while each country should be "a community of participant wills", there were signs that British society was denigrating toward "unparticipant obedience".

According to friend and comrade from the Great War Richard Meinertzhagen, Philipps was sceptical of the idea of a Jewish homeland in Palestine, considering the concept impractical and unnecessary – which frustrated Meinertzhagen. Unconvinced by the proposals of the Zionist movement, he believed that geopolitically and historically, Palestine belonged to the Arab people and that "the honour, the power and the glory of the Jewry lies in the diaspora".

Philipps was uncomfortable with casual antisemitism. He wondered "whether it has not become a public duty of citizens of our free countries, each time we hear Jews as a whole indiscriminately reviled, to not let the occasion pass without question". In 1947 he wrote a letter to The Spectator arguing that dispossessed Jews should be settled in England.

=== Colonialism ===
Philipps supported Frederick Lugard and his 'dual mandate' concept, that on the one hand the European powers should develop the economic resources of the lands they had conquered, but also had a moral responsibility to improve the lot of the native population and adapt them to the modern world. On the subject of race and intelligence he was reluctant to ascribe the technological backwardness of Africa to lack of intelligence, and cautioned Europeans not to "handicap ourselves collectively with too great a condescension or superiority-complex"

Writing in 1922, Philipps noted a growing racial consciousness in Africa, which he blamed on propaganda spread by the Soviet Union and American black intellectuals. He declared that "the coloured peoples are awakening or re-awakening from an age-long sleep". Nonetheless, he felt what he regarded as the economic interdependence of Africa and the European powers made a retreat from imperialism unthinkable.

"Europe needs Africa and Africa needs Europe. The clock cannot be put back."

— "The Tide of Colour: I.--Pan-Africa and Anti-White", Journal of the Royal African Society, 1922, p. 135

By the following decade, he was willing to concede the possibility of decolonisation, but argued that the sudden application of European-style administration and democratic modes of government might be too much of a culture shock.

"Only moral education and European instruction can hope to help the still undiscriminating peoples to attain such stature as to reach up, pick up and distinguish the poisonous from the life-giving fruits of the tree of knowledge-of-good-and-evil of European ways."

— "The New Africa - II", The Nineteenth Century and After, 1938, p. 353

In essence, Philipps believed that Africa's "inexperience in political terms" meant the imposition of full democracy was unwise, instead advocating a hybrid form of government built on partial endorsement of pre-colonial sources of authority; and crucially, implemented from a position of strength to ensure what was left behind was sympathetic to European interests.

== Death ==
At the time of his death he was living in the country at East Hagbourne, Berkshire (now in Oxfordshire), with a second address in Brussels.

He died on 21 July 1959 at the Radcliffe Infirmary in Oxford, and is buried in Enstone, Oxfordshire. His funeral was held in East Hagbourne at St Andrew's parish church on 27 July.

== Selected publications ==
- "'Mufúmbiro': The Birunga Volcanoes of Kigezi-Ruanda-Kivu." The Geographical Journal, vol. 61, no. 4, 233–253 (1923) JSTOR 1781253
- "The Azande: Vongara: Note on the Vongara Ruling Caste of the Zande (Niam-Niam) People." Journal of the Royal African Society, vol. 26, no. 101, 21–26 (1926) JSTOR 716803
- "Observations on Some Aspects of Religion Among the Azande ('Niam-Niam') of Equatorial Africa." The Journal of the Royal Anthropological Institute of Great Britain and Ireland, vol. 56, 171–187 (1926) JSTOR 2843607
- "La nécessité d'une collaboration internationale pour la civilisation des peuples d'Afrique." English translation: "The need for international collaboration for the civilization of the peoples of Africa" Politique Étrangère, vol. 2, no. 1, 56–64 (1937) PDF
- "The Natural Sciences in Africa: The Belgian National Parks." The Geographical Journal, vol. 115, no. 1/3, 58–62 (1950) JSTOR 1789019

== Honours ==
- Military Cross, 1917
- Knight of the Order of Leopold, 1922

== See also ==
- List of Old Abingdonians
- List of Durham University people
- Information Research Department

=== Archives ===
There is a Tracy Philipps fonds at Library and Archives Canada. The archival reference number is R2128.
