= Hillington =

Hillington may refer to:

- Hillington, Norfolk, England
- Hillington, Scotland

== See also ==
- Hillingdon, London
