= Sir Francis ffolkes, 5th Baronet =

English baronet and Anglican priest

The Rev. Sir Francis Arthur Stanley ffolkes, 5th Baronet MVO JP (8 December 1863 – 18 October or 20 October 1938) was an English baronet and Anglican priest who served successive monarchs of the United Kingdom as an Honorary Chaplain and Chaplain-in-Ordinary.

== Biography ==
After his schooling at Oakham, ffolkes studied at Durham University (Hatfield Hall) where he completed a Bachelor of Arts degree in 1885. In 1893 he married Miss Isabel Boschetti and had one son, Edward John Patrick Boschetti ffolkes, who would later succeed to the baronetcy, and one daughter. He was Rector of Scoulton from 1894 to 1897, of Wolferton (close to Sandringham House) till 1912, and, after the death of his father, succeeded him as Rector of Hillington, Norfolk, the home of the ffolkes baronets.

During the First World War ffolkes served as a padre on attachment to the Norfolk Yeomanry. He served during the Battle of Gallipoli. He was also mentioned in despatches in 1917 for his actions as part of the Sinai and Palestine Campaign in Kantara – part of British efforts to protect the Suez Canal from Ottoman forces.

=== Royal service ===
His ecclesiastical career was also closely connected with the Royal Family, serving successively as Honorary Chaplain to Queen Victoria between 1900 and 1901; Honorary Chaplain to King Edward VII between 1901 and 1903, and Chaplain-in-Ordinary to Edward VII between 1903 and 1910; Chaplain-in-Ordinary to King George V between 1910 and 1936; Chaplain-in-Ordinary to King Edward VIII in 1936; and finally Chaplain-in-Ordinary to King George VI in 1937. He was present at both the Coronation of King Edward VII and the Coronation of King George V.

== Death ==
He died on the 18th of October 1938 at Hillington Rectory. A brief obituary in the New York Times described him as 'Chaplain to Queen Victoria and Three Kings of England'.

In 1939 a memorial window dedicated to ffolkes was installed in the Lady Chapel of St Andrew's Church, East Hagbourne, as the gift of his sister, Margaret, the former Viscountess Dillon, who resided in the village, to which ffolkes was in his later years a frequent visitor. The centre of the window features Mary and Jesus.

Unusually, the window also features on one side, a Bishop of the Eastern Orthodox Church in addition to a Western Bishop, and on the other side a Jewish rabbi and a Muslim cleric, all against the backdrop of the 'New Jerusalem'. The scene was apparently inspired by a speech given by ffolkes' nephew Tracy Philipps the previous Autumn at a meeting of the Near and Middle East Association, in which he expressed hope that one day in Jerusalem there would be a 'triple equality', with Jews, Christians, and Muslims living together in peace.

== Honours ==
- Member of the Royal Victorian Order (MVO) – 1908

Baronetage of Great Britain
Preceded by William Everard Browne ffolkes	Baronet (of Hillington); 1930–1938	Succeeded by (Edward John) Patrick Boschetti ffolkes
