= Martin Ffolkes =

English politician

Martin Ffolkes FRS
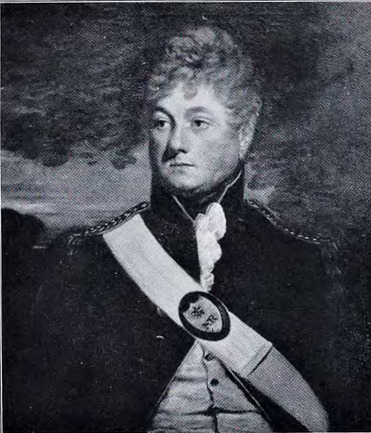

1st Baronet
- In office 1774–1821
- Succeeded by: William John Henry Browne ffolkes

Member of the British Parliament for King's Lynn
- In office 1790–1821

High Sheriff of Norfolk
- In office 1783–1784

Personal details
- Born: 21 May 1749
- Died: 11 December 1821 (aged 72) Hillingdon, UK
- Spouse: Fanny Turner
- Children: 3
- Education: Emmanuel College, Cambridge
- Occupation: lawyer

Military service
- Rank: captain (1794); major (1804
- Unit: Norfolk Rangers

Sir Martin Browne ffolkes, 1st Baronet, FRS (21 May 1749 – 11 December 1821) was an English baronet and Member of Parliament.

Martin ffolkes was the only son of William ffolkes, a barrister of Hillington, Norfolk and his second wife Mary, the daughter and heiress of Sir William Browne, MD, President of the Royal College of Physicians. His uncle was Martin Folkes, President of the Royal Society.

ffolkes was educated at Eton College from 1758 to 1766 and matriculated at Emmanuel College, Cambridge in 1767. He then entered Lincoln's Inn in 1768 to study law. He succeeded his father in 1783, inheriting lands in Norfolk. On the death of his grandfather Sir William Browne in 1774 he restyled himself Browne ffolkes and was created a baronet later that year. He married Fanny, the daughter and coheir of Sir John Turner, 3rd Baronet of Warham, on 28 December 1777; they had a son and two daughters.

He was appointed High Sheriff of Norfolk for 1783–84 and in 1790 was elected MP for King's Lynn, sitting until his death in office in 1821.

He was elected a Fellow of the Royal Society in 1772. He was an officer in the Norfolk Rangers – a captain in 1794 and by 1804 a major.

He died at Hillington in 1821 and was succeeded by his elder son, William John Henry Browne ffolkes.

Parliament of Great Britain
Preceded by Horatio Walpole; Crisp Molineux	Member of Parliament for King's Lynn; 1790–1800; With: Horatio Walpole	Succeeded by Parliament of the United Kingdom
Parliament of the United Kingdom
Preceded by Parliament of Great Britain	Member of Parliament for King's Lynn; 1801–1821; With: Lord Walpole 1801–1809; Lord Walpole 1809–1821	Succeeded by Lord Walpole; Marquess of Titchfield
Baronetage of Great Britain
New creation	Baronet (of Hillington); 1774–1821	Succeeded by William ffolkes
