= Ffolkes baronets =

Title in the Baronetage of Great Britain

ffolkes baronets
- Escutcheon of the ffolkes baronets of Hillington
- Creation date: 1774
- Status: extant
- Motto: Qui sera sera, What will happen, will happen

The ffolkes Baronetcy, of Hillington in the County of Norfolk, is a title in the Baronetage of Great Britain. It was created on 26 May 1774 for Martin ffolkes, FRS later High Sheriff of Norfolk and Member of Parliament for King's Lynn. The second Baronet represented Norfolk and Norfolk West in the House of Commons while the third Baronet represented King's Lynn. The fifth Baronet was Honorary Chaplain to Queen Victoria, Chaplain-in-Ordinary to Edward VII and George V and Chaplain to Edward VIII and George VI.

The family surname is pronounced "Foakes", and is correctly spelled with two lowercase "f"s. See word-initial ff.

== ffolkes baronets, of Hillington (1774) ==
- Sir Martin Browne ffolkes, 1st Baronet (1749–1821)
- Sir William John Henry Browne ffolkes, 2nd Baronet (1786–1860)
- Sir William Hovell Browne ffolkes, 3rd Baronet (1847–1912). His only daughter married John Dawnay, 9th Viscount Downe (1872–1931), and had issue. The third baronet was succeeded by a cousin.
- Sir William Everard Browne ffolkes, 4th Baronet (1861–1930).
- Sir Francis Arthur Stanley ffolkes, 5th Baronet (1863–1938). A chaplain to George V, he was succeeded by his son.
- Sir (Edward John) Patrick Boschetti ffolkes, 6th Baronet (1899–1960)
- Sir Robert Francis Alexander ffolkes, 7th Baronet (born 1943)

There is no heir to the title.

== Notes ==
Baronetage of Great Britain
Preceded by Blake baronets	ffolkes baronets of Hillington; 26 May 1774	Succeeded by Jones baronets
