= William Browne (physician) =

English doctor

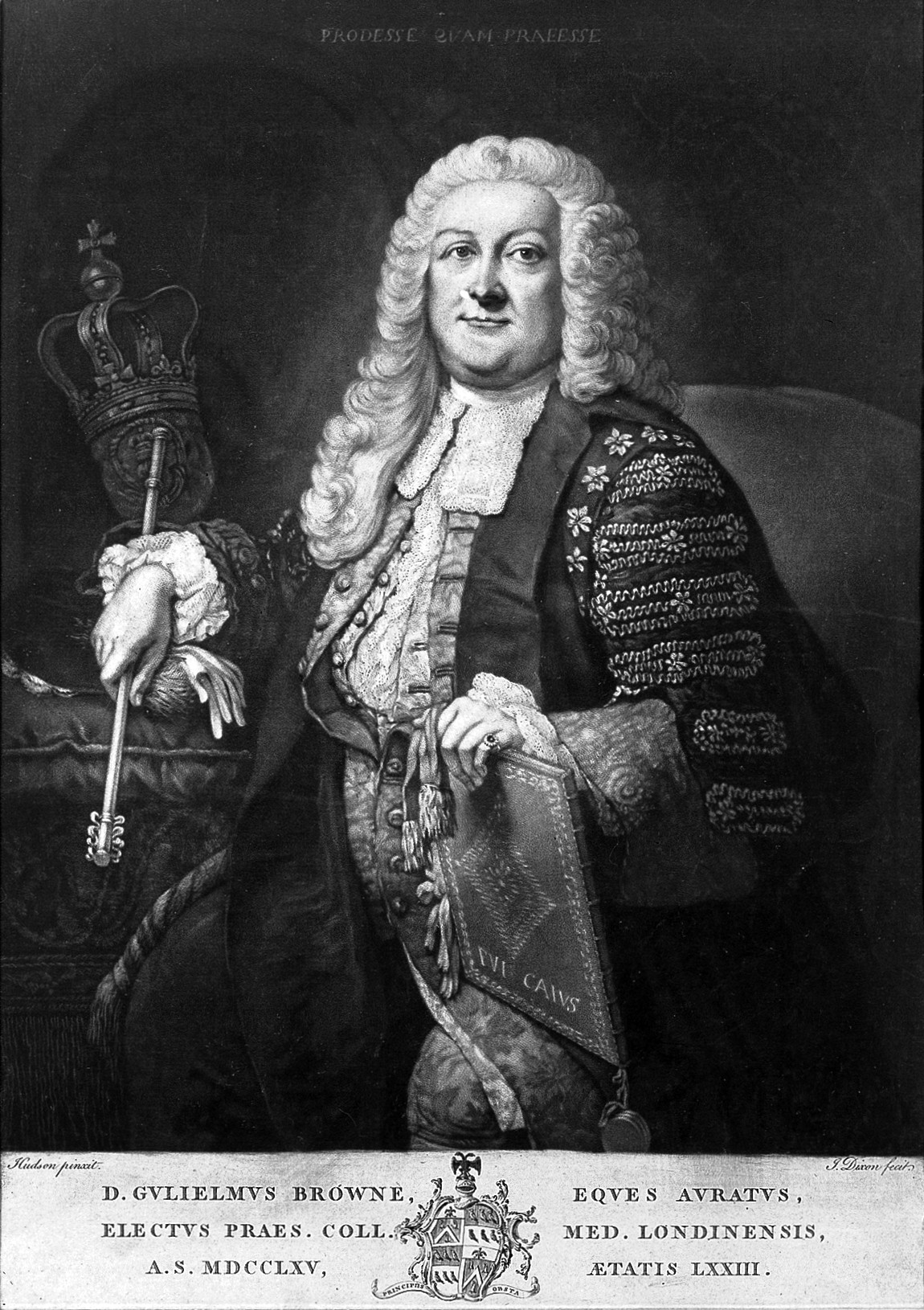
Sir William Browne, after a portrait by Thomas Hudson

Sir William Browne FRS (1692 – 10 March 1774) was an English medical doctor.

== Life ==
Browne was born in County Durham, and was educated at Durham School and at Peterhouse, Cambridge. After graduating (1711 BA, 1714 MA, & 1716 license), he worked as a doctor in King's Lynn, Norfolk, for more than thirty years before moving to Bloomsbury, London, in 1749. He was President of the College of Physicians in 1765 and 1766, having been a Fellow of the college since 1726; he resigned during his five-year term of office because of a dispute. He became a Fellow of the Royal Society in 1739, and was knighted in 1748. He died on 10 March 1774 and left money for a scholarship at Peterhouse and gold medals to be awarded for poetry in Greek and Latin to Cambridge students (the Sir Willam Browne's Medals).

While Browne wrote various books, his most enduring work is an epigram on why George I donated the library of the Bishop of Ely to Cambridge University and not to Oxford University:

The king to Oxford sent a troop of horse,
For tories own no argument but force;
With equal care to Cambridge books he sent,
For whigs allow no force but argument.

== Family ==
While in Kings Lynn William married Mary Greene (1699–1763), daughter of Elizabeth née Truman of Maryland and Charles Greene, an apothecary. They had one daughter Mary (1730–1773), who was the second wife of William Folkes (1700–1773), a barrister. Their son was Sir Martin Browne Ffolkes FRS MP 1st Baronet Ffolkes of Hillington.

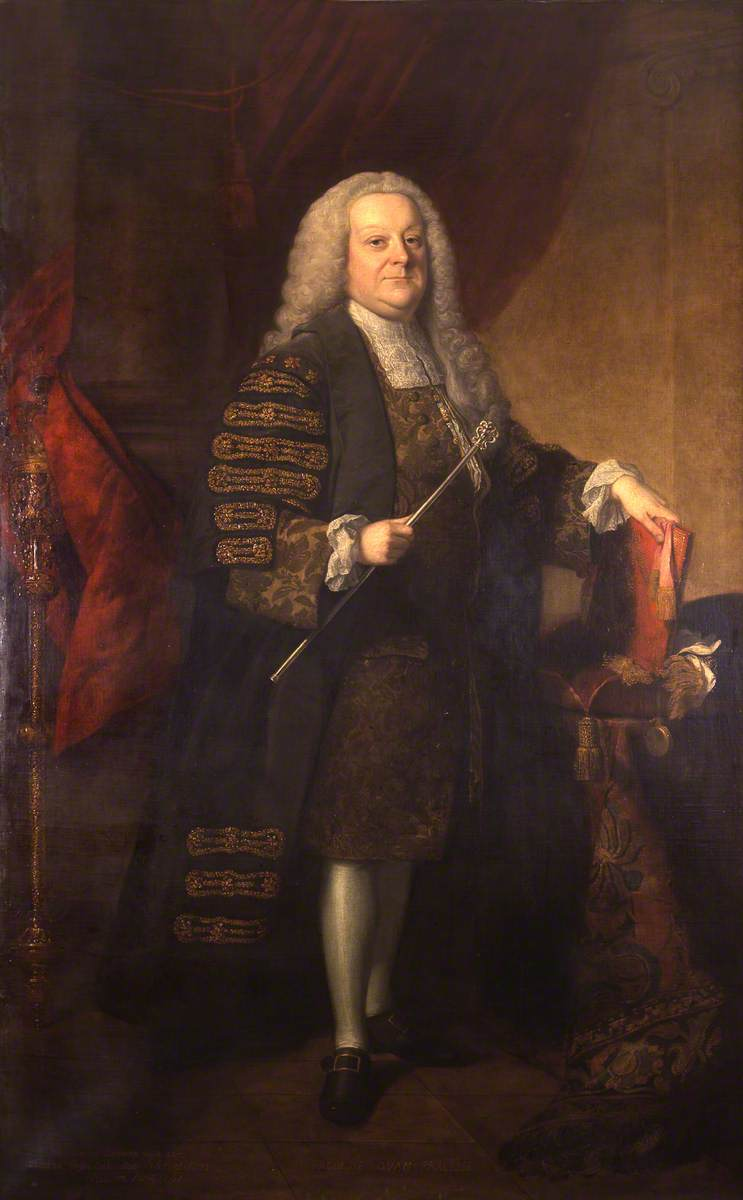
Sir William Browne (1692–1774), painting by Thomas Hudson, 1767

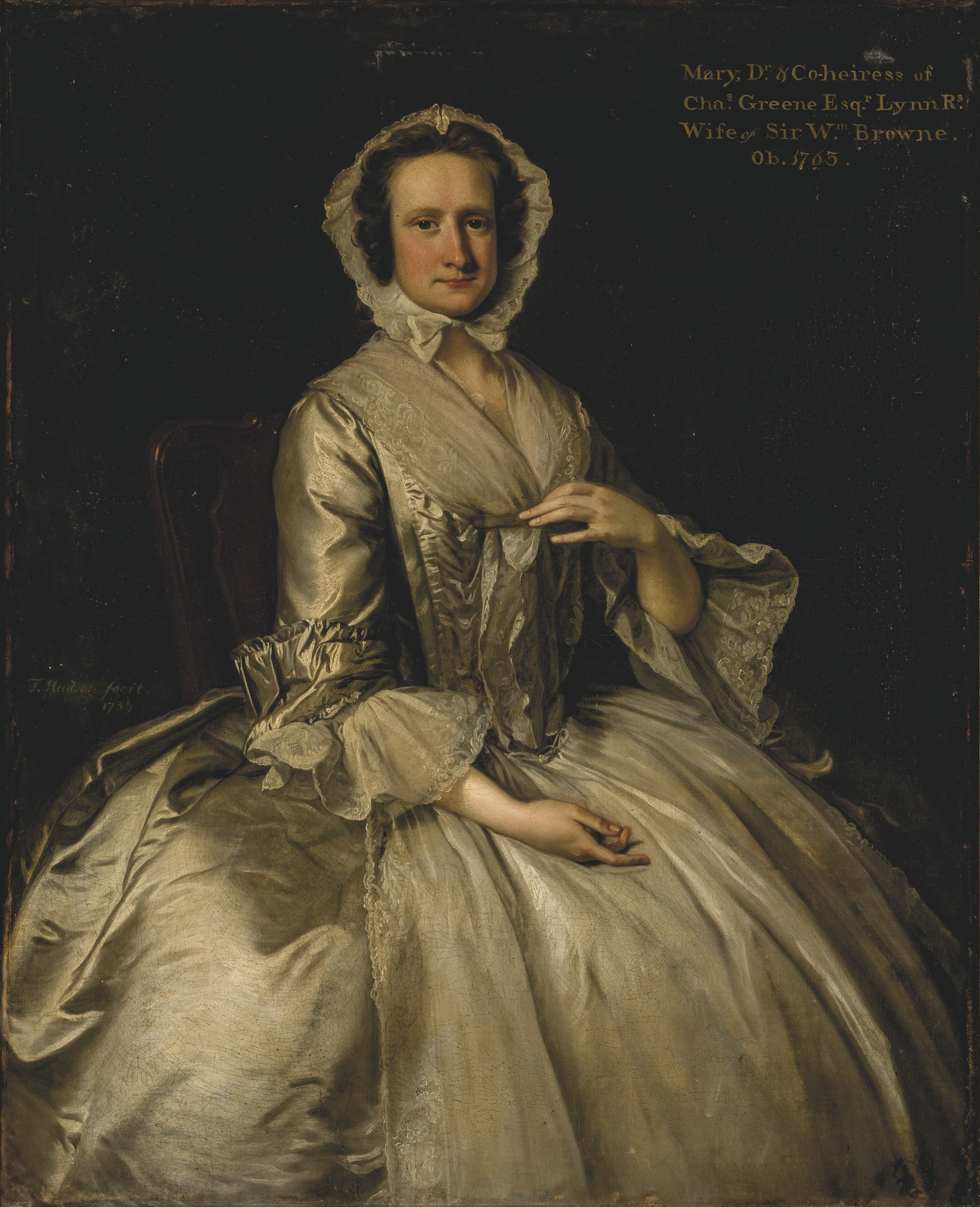
Mary Greene (1699-1763), painting by Thomas Hudson, 1759

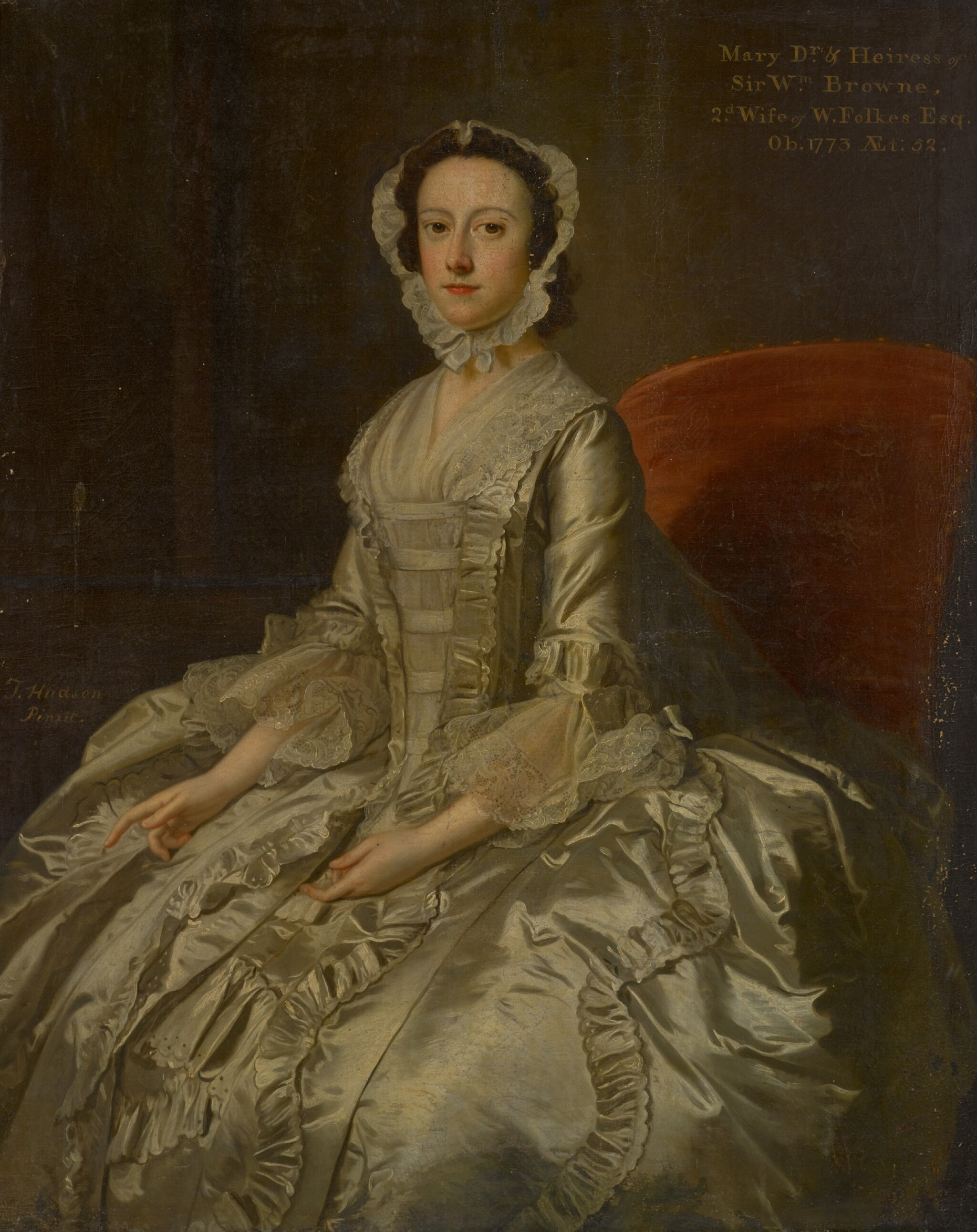
Mary Browne (1721-1773), painting by Thomas Hudson

== List of publications ==
- Dr Gregory's Elements of Catoptrics and Dioptrics, translated from the Latin original by William Browne, MD, at Lynn Regis, in Norfolk. (with some additions) (London, 1735)
- Oratio Harveiana, Principibus Medicis parentans; Medicinam, Academias utrasque laudans; Empiricos eorum cultures perstringens; Collegium usque a natalibus illustrans: in Theatro Collegii Reg. Med. Lond. habita Festo Divi Lucae (London, 1751)
- A Letter from Sir William Browne, deputy-lieutenant of the County of Norfolk, to his Tenants and Neighbours, Seriously Recommended at this Time to the Perusal of all the People of England (London, 1757)
- Two Odes in Imitation of Horace (the second Ode addressed to the Right Hon. Sir Robert Walpole, on ceasing to be Minister, 6 February 1741 (London, 1763 & 1765)
- Opuscula varia utriusque Linguae (containing the Harveian Oration, 1751) (London, 1765)
- Appendix Altera ad Opuscula (his farewell oration) (London, 1768)
- Fragmentum Isaaci Hawkins Browne Arm. sive Anti-Bolinbrokius. Liber Primus, translated for a second Religio Medici (London, 1768) & Fragmentum Isaaci Hawkins Browne completum (London, 1769)
- Appendix ad Opuscula (a Latin Ode with translations) (London, 1770)
- A Proposal on Our Coin: to Remedy all Present and Prevent all Future Disorders (London, 1771)
- A New Year's Gift: a Problem and Demonstration on the XXXIX Articles (London, 1772)
- The Pill Plot. To Dr Ward, a Quack of Merry Memory, written at Lynn, 30 November 1734 (London, 1772)
- Corrections in Verse from the Father of the College on Son Cadogan's Gout Dissertation, containing False Physic, False Logic, False Philosophy (1772)
- Speech on the Royal Society, Recommending Mathematics as the Paramount Qualification for their Chair (1772)
- Elogy and Address (London, 1773)
- Latin version of the Book of Job (unfinished)
