= Uganda Intelligence Department =

Agency overview
- Formed: 1914
- Dissolved: 1921
- Jurisdiction: Uganda Protectorate
- Employees: Unknown
- Parent agency: Colonial government of the Uganda Protectorate

Footnotes
- The department was active primarily during World War I.

The Uganda Intelligence Department (UID) was an organisation mobilised at short notice by the colonial government in the Uganda Protectorate at the start of World War 1. The National Archives 'British Army medal index cards 1914–1920 records list at least 20 people affiliated with the UID; although all those listed below may not have been serving concurrently as mobilisation dates on medal cards do vary.

The officers of the UID came from a number of backgrounds, some were farmers, some army officers from British and colonial regiments, some colonial civil servants and some were businessmen. The following European officers were affiliated with the unit and their ranks and individual Medal Record numbers are also listed (each Medal Record makes reference to the Uganda Intelligence Department, along with other units associated with the officer):

- Lieutenant C E B Dashwood (WO 372/5/169953)
- Captain Harold Chester Croker De La Poer (WO 372/5/144186)
- Captain Herbert Richard Harvey (WO 372/9/71351)
- Lieutenant George Clanson Ishmael (WO 372/10/165186)
- Lieutenant M H King (WO 372/11/172441)
- Lieutenant John W Lenon (WO 372/12/62122)
- Captain T Maxsted (WO 372/13/181827)
- Lieutenant Leopold Henry David McCombie (WO 372/12/196383) - killed in action on 3 July 1915 and buried near Fort Portal in Western Uganda
- Honorary Captain Norman Moore (WO 372/14/73405)
- Honorary Captain James Erasmus Tracy Philipps MC (WO 372/15/219820) - whose personal papers contain most information on the Department
- Lieutenant William Burchell Pickard (WO 372/15/234171)
- Temporary Captain Charles Eric Eugene Sullivan (WO 372/19/103997)
- Honorary Captain George Lawrence Maitland (WO 372/21/12285).

The African soldiers known to be on the Uganda Intelligence Department's establishment were:

- Serjeant Kassim Lugwana (WO 372/11/96542)
- Lance Corporal Ilera Mwanga Wanga (WO 372/10/145367)
- Private Nyansi Lumu (WO 372/15/20166)
- Private Phillippo Lwangoga (WO 372/15/220432) it was reported that Phillippo was a chief and trusted associate of Captain Philipps
- Private Jafali Mitala (WO 372/10/186905)
- Private Alikisi Mumanya (WO 372/1/47360).

There is (as yet) no record of the roles of the African soldiers posted to the department. However, the presence of a tribal chief indicates they were political influencers and collectors of intelligence.

The British Army medal index cards record that the Uganda Intelligence Department personnel were active from 1914 to as late as 1921. The same index cards and medal auction descriptions point to UID personnel being awarded the 1914–15 Star, British War Medal and Victory Medal.

== See also ==
- State Research Bureau (organisation)
