= East Hagbourne =

Village in England

Coordinates: 51.591°N 1.239°W

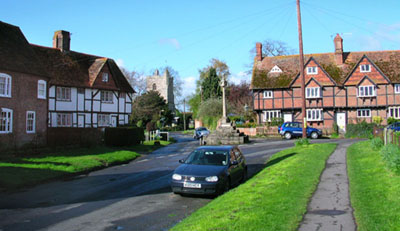
- Houses at Upper Cross

- Location within Oxfordshire
- Area: 3.90 km^{2} (1.51 sq mi)
- Population: 1,882 (2011 census)
  - Density: 483/km^{2} (1,250/sq mi)
- OS grid reference: SU527883
- Civil parish: East Hagbourne
- District: South Oxfordshire
- Shire county: Oxfordshire
- Region: South East
- Country: England
- Sovereign state: United Kingdom
- Post town: Didcot
- Postcode district: OX11
- Dialling code: 01235
- Police: Thames Valley
- Fire: Oxfordshire
- Ambulance: South Central
- UK Parliament: Didcot and Wantage
- Website: East Hagbourne Village and Community

East Hagbourne is a village and civil parish about 1 mile (1.6 km) south of Didcot and 11 miles (18 km) south of Oxford. It was part of Berkshire until the 1974 boundary changes transferred it to Oxfordshire. The 2011 census recorded the parish's population as 1,882.

== Manor ==
East Hagbourne's toponym is derived from Hacca's Brook, a stream that flows through the village. East Hagbourne was sometimes called Church Hagbourne. East and West Hagbourne have been separate villages since the time of Edward the Confessor, when Regenbald, a priest of Cirencester, held the manor of East Hagbourne. Regenbald continued to hold the manor after the Norman Conquest of England in 1066 and compilation of the Domesday Book in 1086. Regenbald died in the reign of Henry I, who then granted East Hagbourne manor to the Augustinians of Cirencester Abbey (founded 1117). The abbey continued to hold the manor until 1539, when it surrendered its lands to the Crown in the dissolution of the monasteries.

== Churches ==
=== Church of England ===
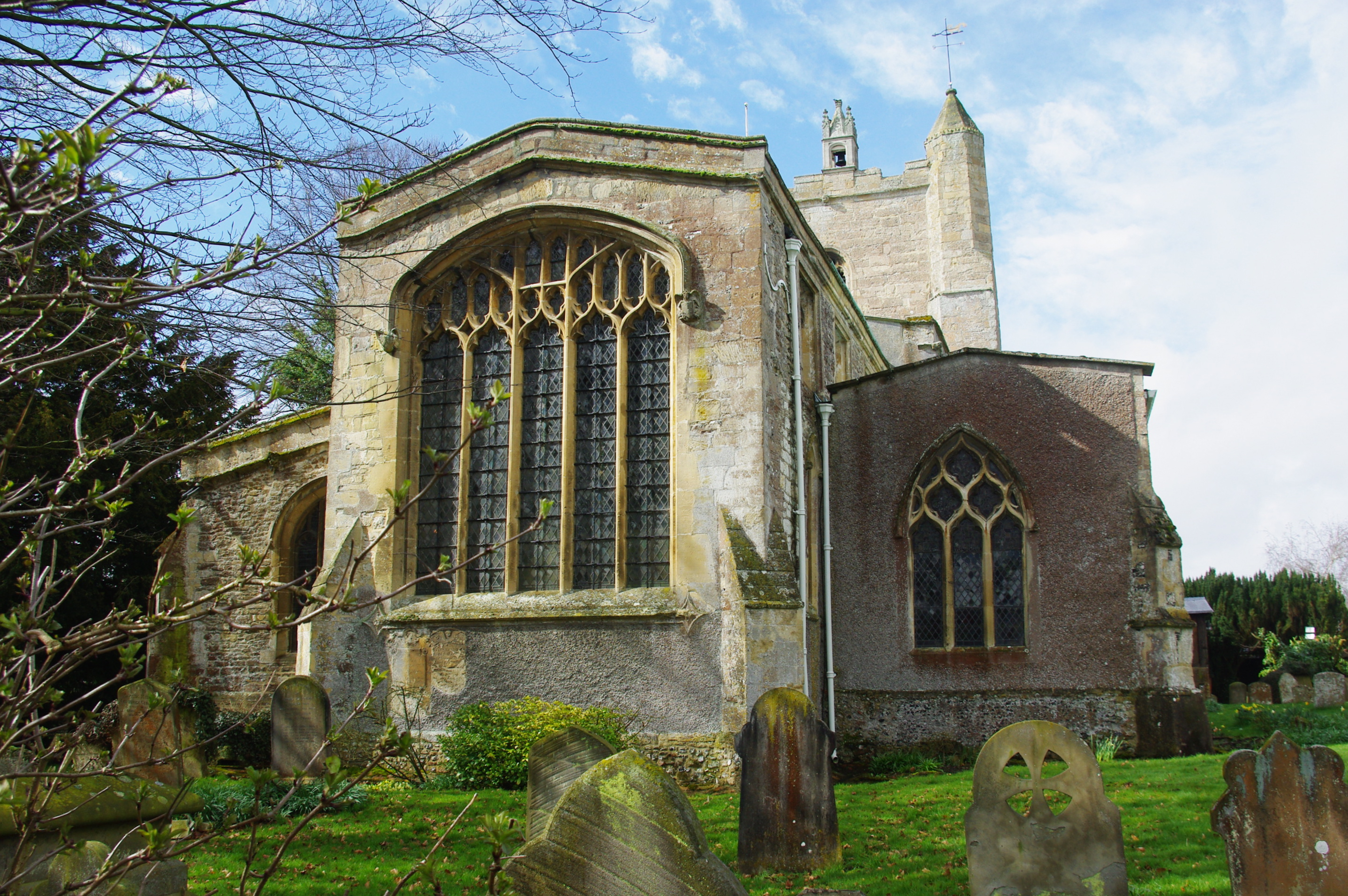
East end of St Andrew's parish church, with the Perpendicular Gothic five-light east window of the chancel

The nave of the Church of England parish church of St Andrew may have been built in the 12th century. The south aisle was added early in the 13th century. It is linked with the nave by a three-bays arcade. It was followed a few years later by the south chapel, which is alongside the chancel and linked to it by a two-bay arcade. The chancel arch was built in the middle of the 13th century. The north aisle, also of three bays, was added about 1340, followed by the Decorated Gothic north chapel, which is alongside the chancel and linked with it by a two-bay arcade. On the floor of the north chapel are monumental brasses commemorating Claricia Wyndesor – quare fieri fecit istam capellam (why did he make this chapel) (died 1403) and her husband John York fundator istius Ile (founder of Ile) (died 1404).

Nikolaus Pevsner takes this to mean that the north chapel was built early in the 15th century, which surprised him as its Decorated Gothic style had been succeeded by Perpendicular Gothic around 1350. However, the south aisle and south chapel were rebuilt in the Perpendicular Gothic style early in the 15th century so Page and Ditchfield conclude that the brasses of Clarice Windsor and John York were formerly in the south chapel and moved at a later date. The south chapel has a squint into the chancel. The chapel was re-roofed in the 17th century. The arch supporting the west bell tower is 14th-century Decorated Gothic but the style of the rest of the tower is Perpendicular Gothic. A Perpendicular Gothic clerestory was added to the nave in the 15th century. The east window of the chancel is also Perpendicular, from late in the 15th century. St Andrew's is a Grade I listed building.

The tower has a ring of eight bells. Joseph Carter of Reading cast the third bell in 1602. Ellis I Knight of Reading cast the fifth and sixth bells in 1641, and Henry II Knight cast the fourth in 1670. Thomas Lester of the Whitechapel Bell Foundry cast the seventh bell in 1751. Robert I Wells of Aldbourne, Wiltshire cast the treble bell in 1770, and his son Robert II Wells of Aldbourne cast the tenor in 1781. Mears and Stainbank at the Whitechapel Bell Foundry cast the second bell in 1910. St Andrew's also has a Sanctus bell, cast by an unknown founder in about 1699. St Andrew's parish is part of the Benefice of the Churn.

=== Primitive Methodist ===
A Primitive Methodist chapel was built in East Hagbourne in the 19th century. It is a red brick building with Gothic Revival ashlar stone details. It has ceased to be used for worship and is now a private house.

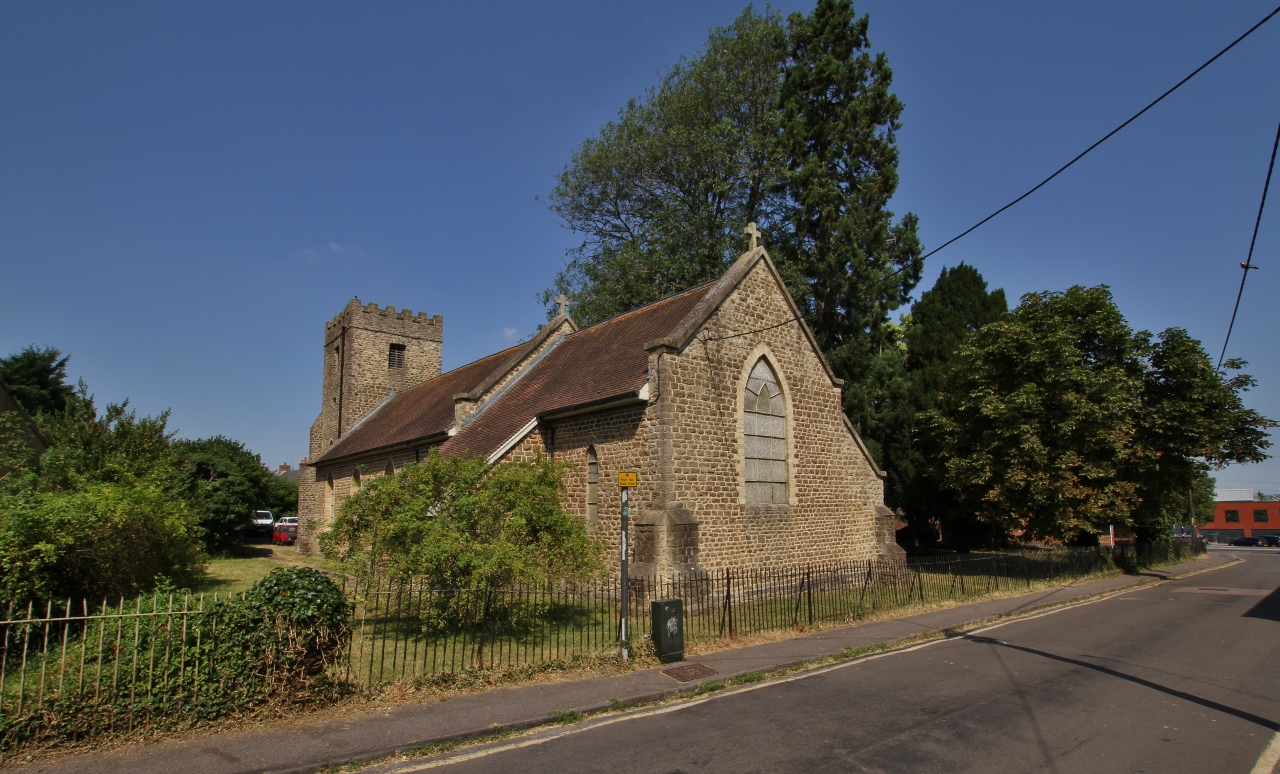
The Northbourne Centre in Didcot, which used to be St Peter's church, founded by the parish of St Andrew, East Hagbourne

=== Churches in Northbourne ===
Churches were built for Northbourne when it was still part of Hagbourne parish: St Peter's Church of England church in 1890, a Wesleyan chapel in 1901 and a Primitive Methodist chapel in 1903. St Peter's now has a new building that was completed in 1977, and its old building is the Northbourne Centre. Northbourne is now part of Didcot: see below.

== Secular buildings and structures ==
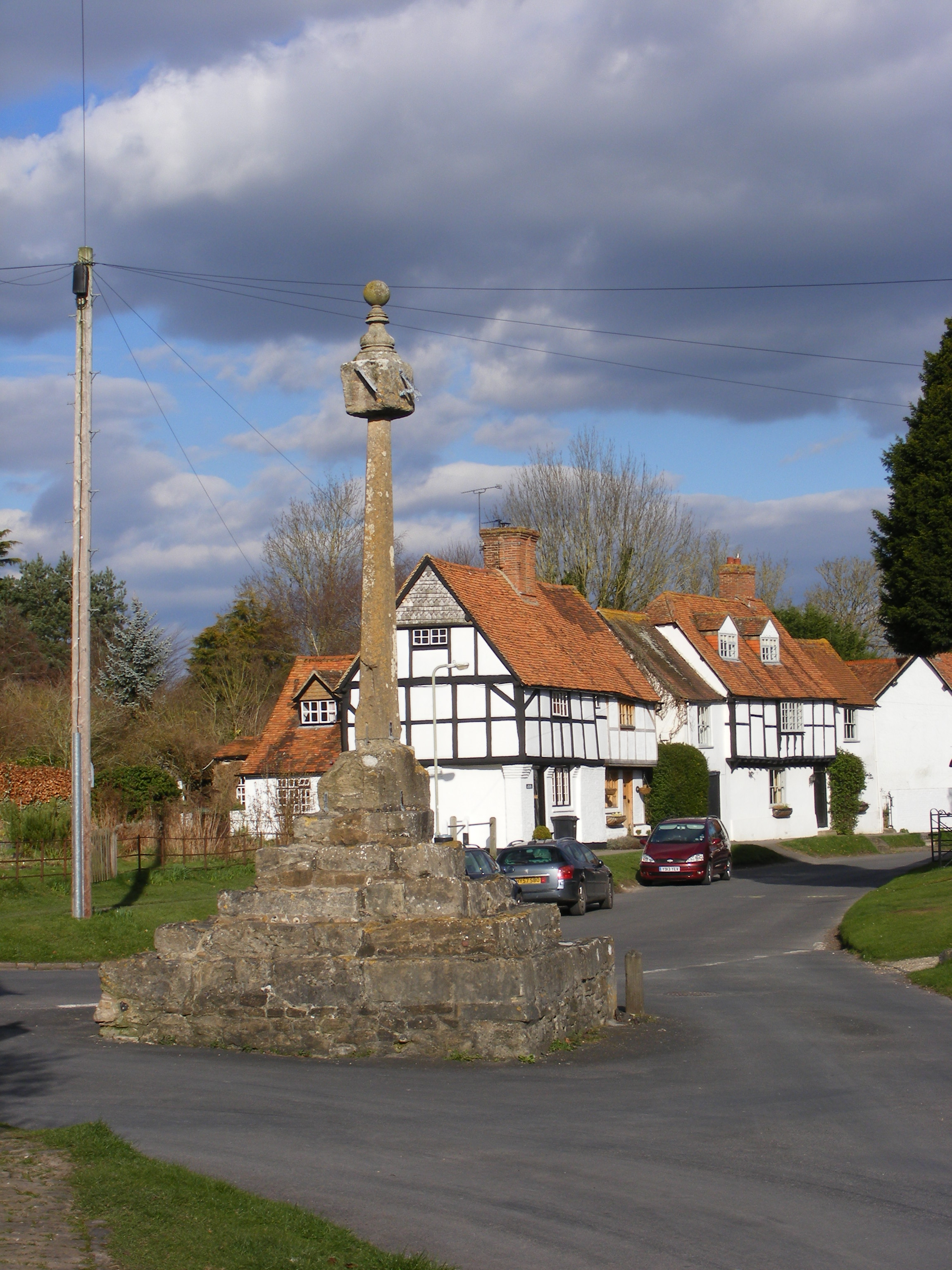
Upper Cross

As well as the parish church, East Hagbourne has at least 45 listed buildings. The majority of East Hagbourne's listed buildings are individual houses and cottages, particularly on Main Road and Church Close, which are mid-17th century and are all Grade II listed. The Village Cross or Upper Cross, at the junction of Main Road and Church Close, is a 15th-century stone cross with an 18th-century finial, on a base of 5 deep stone steps. It is Grade II* listed.

Hagbourne Mill Farm Mill is early 18th century with alterations from about 1828 and is Grade II* listed. It is some way south of the village and not generally open to the public. The Phillips family tomb is a chest tomb in white and grey marble in St Andrew's parish churchyard. It is Grade II* listed. Matthew Phillips, carpenter to the King, is mentioned below. The original part of Kings Holme, 5 Main Road, was built in 1591. Tudor House, 46 Main Road, is a three-storey farmhouse with a thatched barn opposite the Village Cross. It has wooden panelling in the front room and an original corkscrew staircase to the rear.

== Economic and social history ==
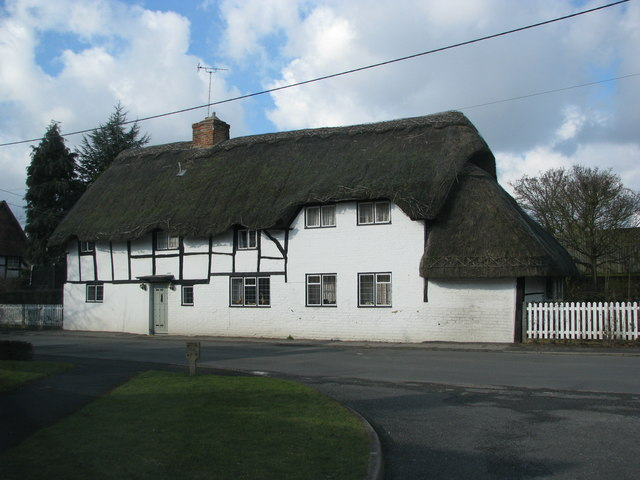
A thatched cottage in East Hagbourne

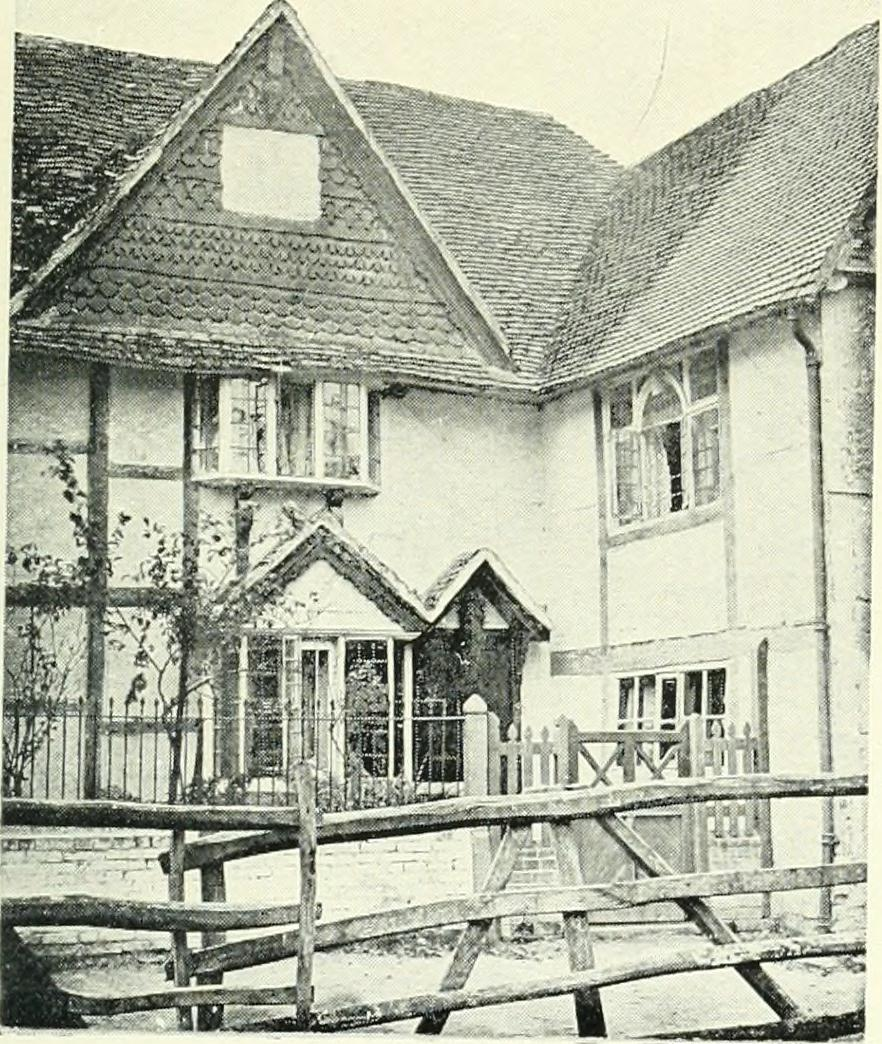
Coscote Manor as pictured in Allan Fae's 1913 travel journal Quiet roads and sleepy villages

In the English Civil War in 1644, the Parliamentarian army billetted 6,000 horsemen in East Hagbourne. During this time it is believed the parish church and Upper Cross were damaged. A tiny window, only three inches square, in a house on Main Road, is said to have been used to spy on the Parliamentarian troops. On 10 March 1659 fire spread through the village, burning down a considerable number of thatched houses. In 1661 Charles II issued a proclamation requesting aid for the village. A sum was received from Londoners and, in return, East Hagbourne sent money to London after the Great Fire of London in 1666. The Hagbourne fire could explain the number of well-preserved houses from after this era.

The village has numerous old timber-framed houses, both around the village cross and along the main street. Coscote Manor, about 1/2 mile (800 m) west of the village, is a timber-framed 17th-century house with fretwork bargeboards and an Ipswich window. Hagbourne Church of England Primary School is in East Hagbourne and was built in 1874. For centuries Hagbourne parish extended north as far as the main road linking Wallingford and Wantage. After the Great Western Main Line reached Didcot Junction in 1844, a new settlement was built in Hagbourne parish next to the boundary with Didcot. This was initially called Newtown or North Hagbourne, but later its name became Northbourne. In the 20th century both Didcot and Northbourne continued to grow. Eventually Northbourne was transferred from Hagbourne to Didcot civil parish, and St Peter's church was given its own ecclesiastical parish.

The Didcot, Newbury and Southampton Railway was built through the parish, passing west of the village & east of Coscote on the still extant Hagbourne Embankment – one of the line's most notable civil engineering features, built upon chalk dug from the route of the line through the Berkshire Downs. The line opened in 1881. There was no station in the parish; the nearest were at Upton and Didcot. In 1911 the Great Western Railway renamed Upton station Upton and Blewbury. In 1942–43 the track was doubled to carry increased war traffic, and the bridges over the West Hagbourne Road & Lake Road were rebuilt. British Railways closed the line to passenger traffic in 1962 & freight in 1967.

Since December 2006 a South Didcot bypass road has been proposed. This would have required the demolition of part of East Hagbourne, particularly houses in the New Road area. The proposal is in abeyance. In 2014 the parish boundary with Didcot was moved and the land locally called Fleet Meadow was made part of the Millbrook ward of Didcot. In 2015 Grainger plc proposed a high-density housing estate of 170 homes on land south of this new boundary. East Hagbourne Parish Council and many Didcot and East Hagbourne residents oppose the development, as does local MP Ed Vaizey. The Mind the Green Gap Campaign formed in July 2015 to campaign against this and other proposals that are contrary to South Oxfordshire District Council's Core Strategy.

== Amenities ==
East Hagbourne has a 17th-century public house, The Fleur de Lys. East Hagbourne has a Church of England Primary School on Main Road. Opposite the school is Hagbourne village hall, shared by East and West Hagbourne and used regularly for village events. In 2010 the building was extended with an additional meeting room, new toilets and storage. There is a small Post Office and a village shop in New Road, opened in 2001 and run by local volunteers.

== Transport ==
Thames Travel route 94 serves East Hagbourne from Mondays to Fridays, linking the village with Didcot town and with Didcot Parkway railway station. Buses run mostly once an hour, with a half-hourly service in the evening peak. There is no Saturday or Sunday service.

== Events ==
In 1996, 1999, 2003 and 2004 East Hagbourne was awarded the title of Best Kept Village in Oxfordshire. In 2009 the village was one of nine UK finalists in the Royal Horticultural Society's Britain in Bloom competition. The village holds several events each year. These include an annual fun run on the May Day bank holiday, typically of 4 1/2 miles (7 km) to 5 1/2 miles (9 km), which involves a run around the surrounding area, including the villages of Blewbury and Upton. There is an annual "scarecrow trail", a village fête and, in August, a duck race on Hacca's Brook. In recent years a Mummers Play has toured the village in December.

The annual scarecrow festival has been held in the village since 2005, raising money for charity.

== Film and television ==
In July 1975, the location scenes for the Doctor Who serial The Android Invasion were filmed in the village. In 1989, Tom Baker, who starred as the Doctor, returned to the village to be interviewed by Nicholas Briggs about his time on Doctor Who for the Reeltime Pictures Myth Makers series. In 2012, Briggs returned to the village to interview residents for The Village That Came to Life, a making-of documentary featured on the DVD release of The Android Invasion.

In 2015, two television channels featured East Hagbourne in reports about the Mind the Green Gap Campaign.

== Notable residents ==
- Thomas Phillips (about 1689–1736), carpenter to kings George I and George II, lived in East Hagbourne and is buried in St Andrew's parish churchyard.
- Television chef Keith Floyd married in East Hagbourne and lived in a cottage in the village for a short time.
- Tracy Philipps (1888–1959), Intelligence Officer, Colonial Administrator and Conservationist amid numerous other activities, lived in the village during his retirement.

== Sources ==
- Clare, Brenda; Lawson, Monica; Pereira, Willie (1995). East Hagbourne Times: Portrait of an English Village. East Hagbourne: East Hagbourne Parish Council. ISBN 0-9527211-0-4.
- Fae, Allan (1913). Quiet roads and sleepy villages. London: E Nash. pp. 196–7 – via Internet Archive.
- Page, William; Ditchfield, PH, eds. (1923). "Didcot". A History of the County of Berkshire. Victoria County History. Vol. III. assisted by John Hautenville Cope. London: The St Katherine Press. pp. 475–484.
- Pevsner, Nikolaus (1966). Berkshire. The Buildings of England. Harmondsworth: Penguin Books. pp. 132–133.
