= William Ffolkes (cricketer) =

English cricketer

William ffolkes
Personal information
- Full name: William John Browne ffolkes
- Born: 13 January 1820; Hillington, Norfolk, England
- Died: 16 November 1867 (aged 47); Marylebone, London, England

Career statistics
Competition	First-class
Matches	2
Runs scored	25
Batting average	12.50
100s/50s	0/0
Top score	16
Catches/stumpings	1/–
- Source: Cricinfo, 29 September 2018

William John Browne ffolkes (13 January 1820 – 16 November 1867) was an English first-class cricketer.

ffolkes was born at Hillington Hall in Norfolk in October 1894, to Charlotte Philippa Browne and her husband, Sir William ffolkes. He was educated at Harrow School. ffolkes made two appearances in first-class cricket, both for the West of England in 1845. Both matches came against the Marylebone Cricket Club, with the first played at Lord's in June, and the second played at Cricket Down, Bath. He worked as the Secretary to the Chairman of the Inland Revenue. He died at Marylebone in November 1867.
