= West Hagbourne =

Village in Oxfordshire, England

Coordinates: 51.584°N 1.258°W

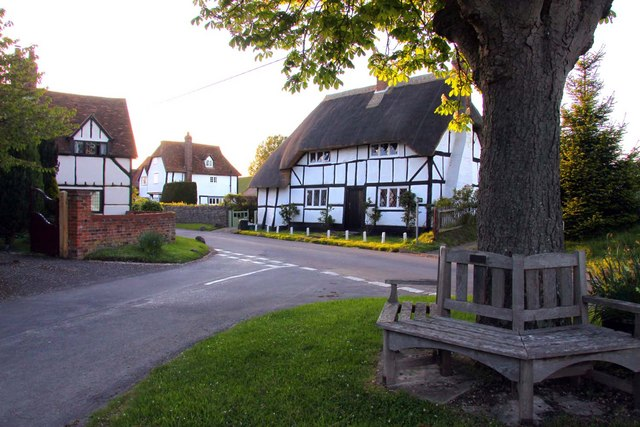
- Part of the village

- Location within Oxfordshire
- Area: 4.12 km^{2} (1.59 sq mi)
- Population: 259 (2011 Census)
  - Density: 63/km^{2} (160/sq mi)
- OS grid reference: SU5187
- Civil parish: West Hagbourne
- District: South Oxfordshire
- Shire county: Oxfordshire
- Region: South East
- Country: England
- Sovereign state: United Kingdom
- Post town: Didcot
- Postcode district: OX11
- Dialling code: 01235
- Police: Thames Valley
- Fire: Oxfordshire
- Ambulance: South Central
- UK Parliament: Didcot and Wantage
- Website: West Hagbourne Oxfordshire

West Hagbourne is a village and civil parish in the Berkshire Downs about 2 miles (3 km) south of Didcot. The 2011 Census recorded a parish population of 259.

== History ==
The village was part of Berkshire until the 1974 boundary changes transferred it to Oxfordshire and from the former Wallingford Rural District to the district of South Oxfordshire. It was separated from East Hagbourne in the late Middle Ages.

== Amenities ==
West Hagbourne's Church of England parish church is St Andrew's, East Hagbourne. West Hagbourne has a public house, the Horse and Harrow.

== Education ==
Hagbourne Church of England Primary School in neighbouring East Hagbourne serves West Hagbourne. The County secondary schools that serve West Hagbourne are in Didcot: St. Birinus School (for boys) and Didcot Girls School.

== Transport ==
Thames Travel route 94 serves West Hagbourne from Mondays to Fridays, linking the village with Didcot town and with Didcot Parkway railway station. Buses run mostly once an hour, with a half-hourly service in the evening peak. There is no Saturday or Sunday service.

== Sources ==
- Ditchfield, PH; Page, William, eds. (1924). "Hagbourne". A History of the County of Berkshire. Victoria County History. Vol. IV. assisted by John Hautenville Cope. London: The St Katherine Press. pp. 475–484.
