= Hillington, Norfolk =

Village in Norfolk, England

Coordinates: 52.80018°N 0.54734°E

Hillington
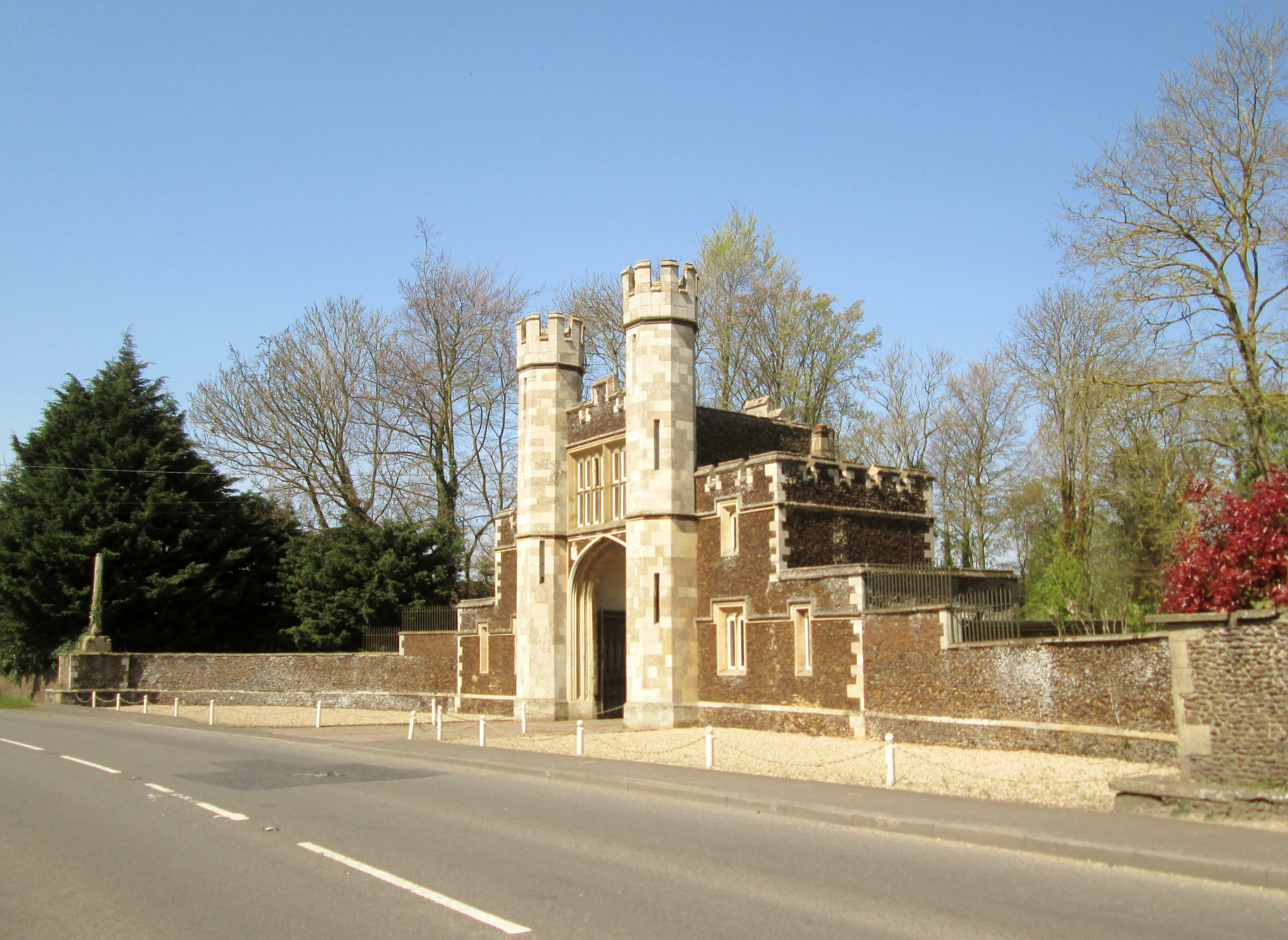
- Main gate to Hillington Hall

- Location within Norfolk
- Area: 7.54 sq mi (19.5 km^{2})
- Population: 404 (2021 census)
  - Density: 54/sq mi (21/km^{2})
- OS grid reference: TF718255
- Civil parish: Hillington
- District: King's Lynn and West Norfolk
- Shire county: Norfolk
- Region: East
- Country: England
- Sovereign state: United Kingdom
- Post town: KING'S LYNN
- Postcode district: PE31
- Dialling code: 01485
- UK Parliament: North West Norfolk

Hillington is a village and civil parish in the English county of Norfolk.

Hillington is located 6.4 miles (10.3 km) north-east of King's Lynn and 33 miles (53 km) north-west of Norwich, along the A148.

== History ==
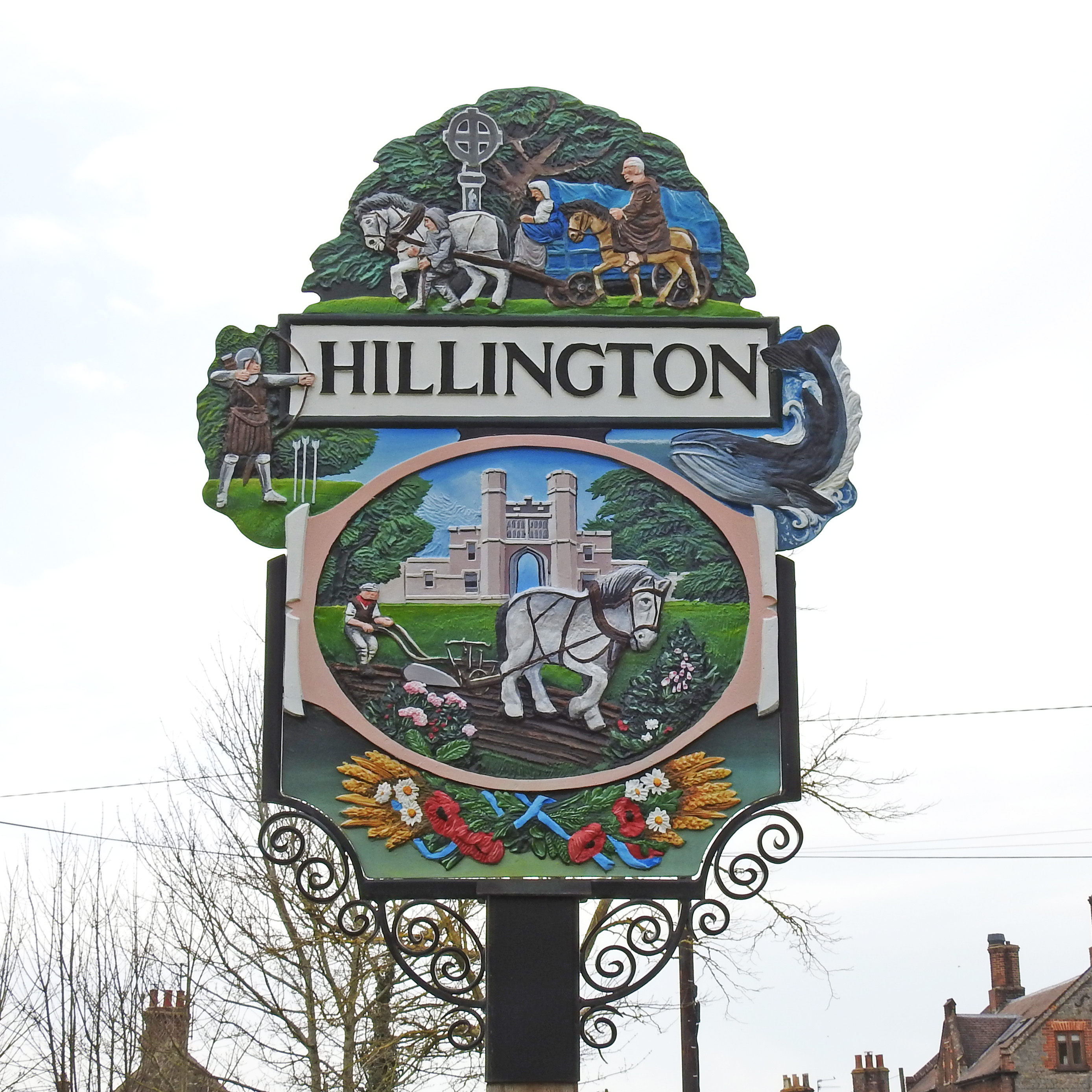
Hillington village sign (east face)

Hillington's name is of Anglo-Saxon origin and derives from the Old English for the settlement of Hythla's people.

In the Domesday Book, Hillington is recorded as a settlement of 46 households in the hundred of Freebridge. In 1086, the village was divided between the estates of William de Warenne, Eudo, son of Spirewic and Berner the Bowman.

Hillington Hall was built in 1624 and later incorporated into a new hall by William Donthorn, c1824-30. Hillington Hall was demolished c1947 but the gatehouse remains and is a listed building.

The Ffolkes Arms Pub has stood in the village since 1845 and is reputedly haunted by the ghost of a nanny who jumped from the building to her death in the 19th century.

Hillington railway station opened in 1879 as part of the Midland and Great Northern Joint Railway between Sutton Bridge and Norwich. The station closed in 1959 to passengers and in 1965 to freight.

== Geography ==
According to the 2021 census, Hillington has a population of 404 people which shows an increase from the 400 people listed in the 2011 census.

The A148, between King's Lynn and Cromer, passes through the village.

== St Mary's Church ==
Hillington's parish church is dedicated to Saint Mary and dates from the 15th century. St Mary's is located within the village on Congham Road and has been Grade II* listed since 1960. The church is no longer open for Sunday service and is part of the Sandringham Group of Churches.

The organ of 1756 is by John Snetzler in a panelled mahogany case. St Mary's features good examples of 19th-century stained-glass windows including Christ with Saint Peter and Saint Paul by Wilmshurst & Oliphant as well as the Adoration of the Magi and the Shepherds by Hardman & Co.

== Notable residents ==
- Martin ffolkes (1749-1821) ,politician and nobleman, born, lived and died in Hillington.
- Sir William ffolkes, 2nd Baronet (1786-1860), politician, born in Hillington.
- William ffolkes (1820-1867), West of England cricketer, born in Hillington.
- Sir William ffolkes, 3rd Baronet (1847-1912), politician, lived and died in Hillington.
- Sir Francis ffolkes, 5th Baronet (1863-1938), Rector of Hillington.
- Tracy Philipps (1888-1959), public servant, born in Hillington.

== Governance ==
Hillington is part of the electoral ward of Massingham with Castle Acre for local elections and is part of the district of King's Lynn and West Norfolk.

The village's national constituency is North West Norfolk which has been represented by the Conservative James Wild since 2019.

== War memorial ==
Hillington War Memorial is a simple Latin cross located in St Mary's churchyard. The memorial was erected in 1920 by Holman's of Lynn and lists the following names for the First World War:

Rank	Name	Unit	Date of death	Burial/Commemoration
2Lt.	William R. C. ffolkes	1st Bn., King's Royal Rifle Corps	30 Dec. 1917	Hermies Hill Cemetery
Cpl.	Charles Hardy	12th Bn., Manchester Regiment	8 Feb. 1917	Thiepval Memorial
LCpl.	William Mickleburgh	8th Bn., Border Regiment	31 Jul. 1916	Thiepval Memorial
LCpl.	William G. Roye	1st Bn., Norfolk Regiment	28 Jun. 1917	Arras Memorial
Pte.	Frank S. Shephard	Bedfordshire Regiment	1919	Unknown
Pte.	Frederick C. Howard	7th Bn., Norfolk Regiment	11 Aug. 1916	Thiepval Memorial
Pte.	John English	7th Bn., Norfolk Regt.	28 Apr. 1917	Arras Memorial
Rfn.	John F. Smith	15th Bn., Royal Irish Rifles	8 May 1918	Solferino Cemetery

The following names were added following the Second World War:

Rank	Name	Unit	Date of death	Burial/Commemoration
Sgt.	John Gooch	1st Bn., South Lancashire Regiment	15 Aug. 1946	Tell El Kebir Cemetery
Pte.	Victor E. Thurston	2nd Bn., Devonshire Regiment	31 Mar. 1945	Reichswald Forest Cemetery
