= Sir William ffolkes, 3rd Baronet =

English politician

ffolkes in 1880

Sir William Hovell Browne ffolkes, 3rd Baronet (21 November 1847 – 9 May 1912) was an English Liberal politician who sat in the House of Commons from 1880 to 1885.

ffolkes was the son of Martin William Browne ffolkes and his wife Henrietta Bridget Wale, daughter of Sir Charles Wale of Little Shelford, Cambridgeshire. He was educated at Harrow School and at Trinity College, Cambridge. His father was killed by lightning in 1849 and he succeeded his grandfather Sir William ffolkes, 2nd Baronet to the baronetcy in 1860. He was a captain in the Norfolk Artillery Militia and was a J.P. and deputy lieutenant. In 1876 he was High Sheriff of Norfolk.

ffolkes stood for parliament unsuccessfully at King's Lynn in 1874. At the 1880 general election he was elected member of parliament for King's Lynn. He held the seat until defeated in 1885. He subsequently left the Liberals to join the Liberal Unionist Party, standing unsuccessfully for them in the 1900 election in the North West Norfolk constituency. He became chairman of Norfolk County Council in 1902 and was awarded KCVO in 1909.

ffolkes lived at Hillington Hall and died in 1912 at the age of 64.

ffolkes married Emily Charlotte Elwes, daughter of Robert Elwes of Congham House, Norfolk in 1875. His only daughter married John Dawnay, 9th Viscount Downe, and had issue. He was succeeded in the baronetcy by his cousin.

Parliament of the United Kingdom
Preceded by Lord Claud Hamilton; Robert Bourke	Member of Parliament for King's Lynn; 1880 – 1885; With: Robert Bourke	Succeeded by Robert Bourke
Baronetage of Great Britain
Preceded by William ffolkes	Baronet (of Hillington); 1860–1912	Succeeded by William ffolkes
