= Ipswich window =

Variety of oriel window

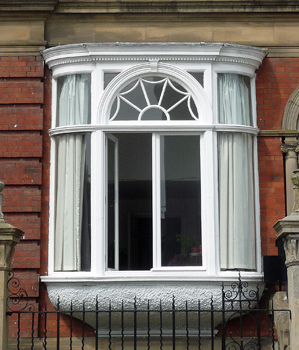
Ipswich window in Newcastle, England, in which the Venetian central arched window is surmounted by triangular panes of glass, and the side windows are full height.

An Ipswich window is an adapted form of the Venetian window in which the distinguishing feature is in the arrangement of the panes of glass: A Venetian window has an arched central light, symmetrically flanked by two shorter sidelights; an Ipswich window places the Venetian window within a rectangular frame, adds window panes above the central arch and extends the height of the side windows. Ipswich windows are often constructed as a variety of oriel window in which the window juts out from the wall without reaching down to the ground, but the oriel design element is not a key characteristic of an Ipswich window.

Richard Norman Shaw featured the Ipswich window in his design of the New Zealand Chambers, Leadenhall Street, London. This was built in 1871–73, but was destroyed by bombing during the Second World War.

== Gallery ==
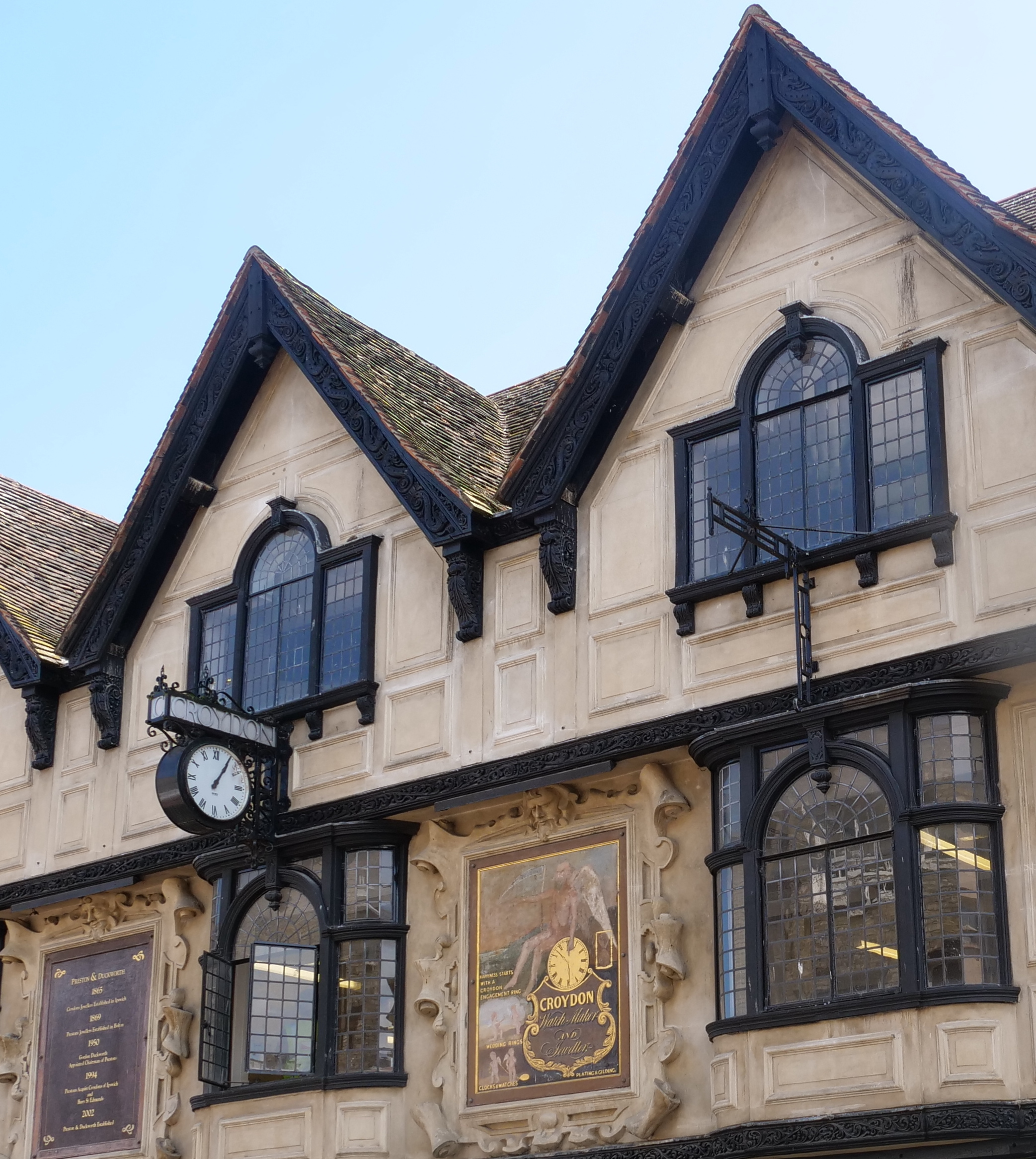
Croydon's shop, Tavern Street, Ipswich

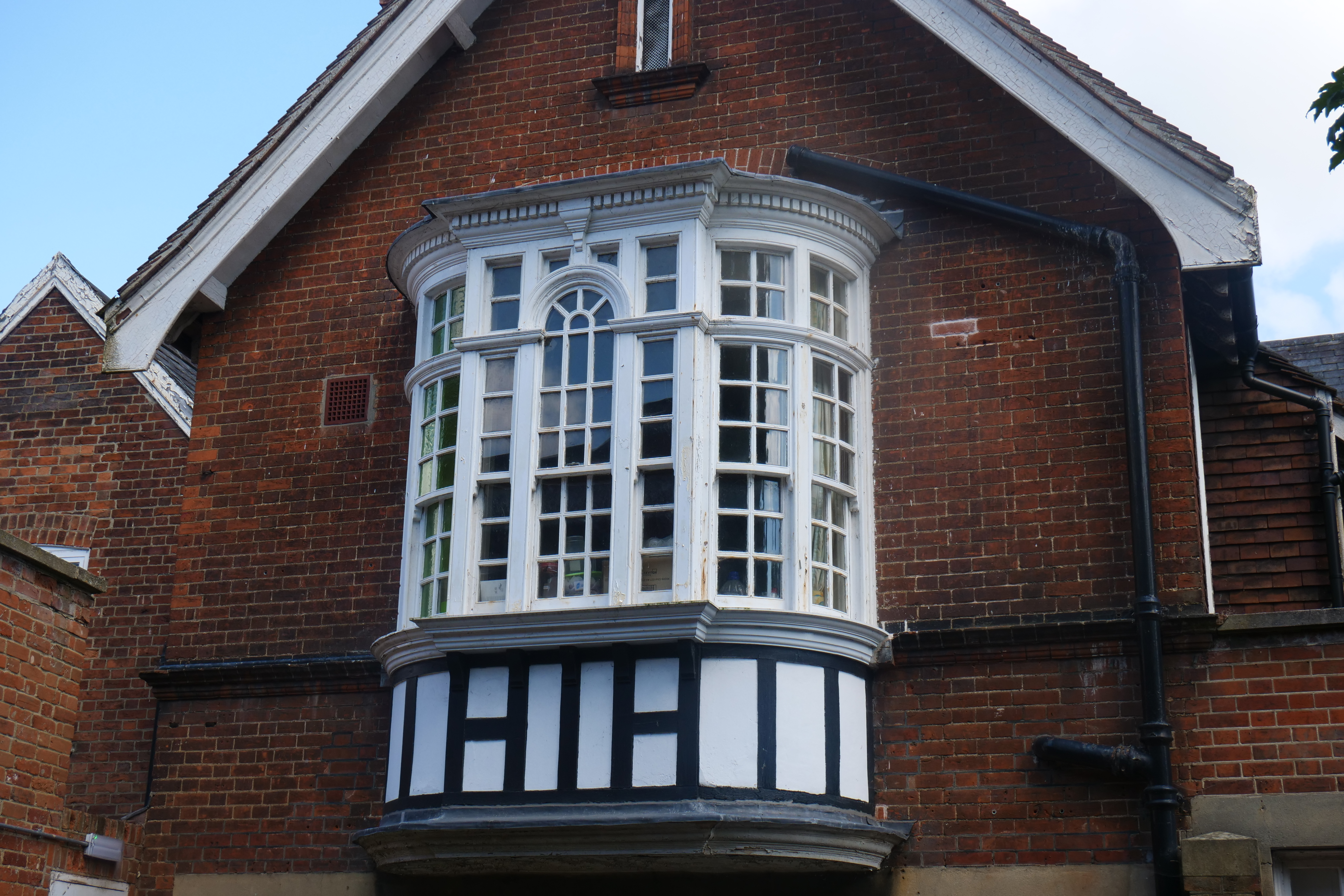
Rear of 19 Tower Street, Ipswich
