= Sir William ffolkes, 2nd Baronet =

English Whig politician

Sir William John Henry Browne ffolkes, 2nd Baronet, FRS (30 August 1786 – 24 March 1860) was an English Whig politician who sat in the House of Commons from 1830 to 1837.

ffolkes was the son of Sir Martin ffolkes, 1st Baronet. He was educated at Harrow School and was admitted at Jesus College, Cambridge on 6 April 1805. He was awarded B.A. in 1810 and M.A. in 1813. He succeeded to the baronetcy on the death of his father on 11 December 1821.

He was appointed High Sheriff of Norfolk for 1828–29 and in 1830 was elected member of parliament for Norfolk, a seat he held until it was divided under the Reform Act 1832. He was then elected MP for Norfolk West in the reformed parliament and sat until 1837. He was a J.P. and deputy lieutenant for Norfolk and chairman of Norfolk Quarter Sessions.

He died at the age of 73. He had married Charlotte Philippa Browne, daughter of Dominick Geoffrey Browne, of Castle MacGarrett, Co. Mayo and sister of Dominick, first Lord Oranmore on 21 April 1818. His son Martin was killed by lightning, and he was succeeded in the baronetcy by his grandson William.

Parliament of England
Preceded by Edmond Wodehouse; Thomas Coke	Member of Parliament for Norfolk; 1830–1832; With: Thomas Coke	Constituency divided
New constituency	Member of Parliament for Norfolk West; 1832–1837; With: Sir Jacob Astley, Bt	Succeeded by William Bagge; William Chute
Baronetage of Great Britain
Preceded by Martin ffolkes	Baronet (of Hillington); 1821–1860	Succeeded by William ffolkes
