= John Bilney =

John Bilney may refer to:

- John Bilney (MP for Cambridge)
- John Bilney (MP for Bishop's Lynn)
