= George Bridgeman =

George Bridgeman may refer to:

- George Bridgeman, 2nd Earl of Bradford (1789–1865), British peer
- George Bridgeman, 4th Earl of Bradford (1845–1915), British soldier and peer
- George Thomas Orlando Bridgeman (1823–1895), Church of England clergyman and antiquary

== See also ==
- George Bridgman (1864–1943), American artist, author and teacher
- George Soudon Bridgman (1839–1925), British architect and civil engineer
