= Horatio Walpole, 2nd Earl of Orford =

British politician

The Right Honourable The Earl of Orford
- Portrait by Pompeo Batoni

Member of the Great Britain Parliament for Wigan
- In office 1780–1784 Serving with: Henry Simpson Bridgeman 1780–1782; John Cotes 1782–1784
- Preceded by: George Byng; Henry Simpson Bridgeman
- Succeeded by: John Cotes; Orlando Bridgeman

Member of the Great Britain Parliament for King's Lynn
- In office 1784–1800 Serving with: Crisp Molineux 1784–1790; Sir Martin ffolkes, Bt 1790–1801
- Preceded by: Hon. Thomas Walpole; Crisp Molineux
- Succeeded by: Parliament of the United Kingdom

Member of Parliament for King's Lynn
- In office 1801–1809 Serving with Sir Martin ffolkes, Bt
- Preceded by: Parliament of Great Britain
- Succeeded by: Sir Martin ffolkes, Bt; Lord Walpole

Personal details
- Born: 13 or 24 June 1752
- Died: 15 June 1822
- Spouses: Sophia Churchill; Catherine Tunstall
- Children: Horatio Walpole, 3rd Earl of Orford, Catharine Long, Lady Harriet Walpole
- Parents: Horatio Walpole, 1st Earl of Orford; Lady Rachel Cavendish

Horatio Walpole, 2nd Earl of Orford (13 or 24 June 1752 – 15 June 1822), styled The Honourable Horatio Walpole between 1757 and 1806 and Lord Walpole between 1806 and 1809, was a British peer and politician.

== Background ==
Orford was the son of Horatio Walpole, 1st Earl of Orford, son of Horatio Walpole, 1st Baron Walpole (of Wolterton), brother of Prime Minister Robert Walpole, 1st Earl of Orford. His mother was Lady Rachel Cavendish, daughter of William Cavendish, 3rd Duke of Devonshire. He gained the courtesy title Lord Walpole when the earldom of Orford was revived in favour of his father in 1806.

== Political career ==
Orford was elected Member of Parliament for Wigan in 1780, a seat he held until 1784, and then represented King's Lynn between 1784 and 1809. The latter year he succeeded his father in the earldom and entered the House of Lords.

During the American War of Independence his kinsman George Walpole, 3rd Earl of Orford (of the first creation), as Lord Lieutenant of Norfolk, appointed him Lieutenant-Colonel of the East Norfolk Militia. After the earl died, Horatio was promoted to succeed him as Colonel of the West Norfolk Militia. On his own death in 1822, he was succeeded in command by his son Horatio Walpole, 3rd Earl of Orford.

== Family ==
Lord Orford was twice married. He married firstly Sophia, daughter of Charles Churchill and granddaughter of Robert Walpole, in 1781. After her death in 1797, he married secondly Catherine, daughter of Reverend James Tunstall, in 1806. She died the following year. Lord Orford survived her by 15 years and died in June 1822. He was succeeded in the earldom by his son, Horatio.

== Arms ==
Coat of arms of Horatio Walpole, 2nd Earl of Orford
| Crest The bust of a man in profile couped proper, ducally crowned or, from the coronet flowing a long cap turned forwards gules tasselled and charged with a catherine wheel gold. Escutcheon Or, on a fess between. two chevrons sable, three crosses crosslet of the first. Supporters Dexter, an antelope; sinister, a stag argent, attired proper, each gorged with a collar chequy or and azure chained gold. Motto Fari quæ sentiat (To speak what he feels). |

Parliament of Great Britain
| Preceded by George Byng; Henry Simpson Bridgeman | Member of Parliament for Wigan; 1780–1784; With: Henry Simpson Bridgeman 1780–1782; John Cotes 1782–1784 | Succeeded by John Cotes; Orlando Bridgeman |
| Preceded by Hon. Thomas Walpole; Crisp Molineux | Member of Parliament for King's Lynn; 1784–1800; With: Crisp Molineux 1784–1790; Sir Martin ffolkes, Bt 1790–1801 | Succeeded by Parliament of the United Kingdom |
Parliament of the United Kingdom
| Preceded by Parliament of Great Britain | Member of Parliament for King's Lynn; 1801–1809; With: Sir Martin ffolkes, Bt | Succeeded by Sir Martin ffolkes, Bt; Lord Walpole |
Peerage of the United Kingdom
| Preceded by Horatio Walpole | Earl of Orford; 3rd creation 1809–1822 | Succeeded by Horatio Walpole |
Peerage of Great Britain
| Preceded by Horatio Walpole | Baron Walpole of Walpole; 1809–1822 | Succeeded by Horatio Walpole |
| Preceded by Horatio Walpole | Baron Walpole of Wolterton; 1809–1822 | Succeeded by Horatio Walpole |
