= William Lok (politician) =

English politician

William Lok (fl. 1402–1412) was an English politician. He sat as MP for Bishop's Lynn in 1407.
