= Henry Simpson Bridgeman =

British politician (1757–1782)

Henry Simpson Bridgeman (12 April 1757 – 26 July 1782) was a British politician who sat in the House of Commons from 1780 to 1782.

Bridgeman was the eldest son of Henry Bridgeman and his wife Elizabeth Simpson, daughter of Rev. John Simpson. He was educated at Harrow School and at Newcome's School at Hackney, and was admitted at Trinity College, Cambridge on 3 June 1775.

Bridgeman was returned as Member of Parliament for Wigan at a by-election on 21 August 1780 on the family interest, supported by the Duke of Portland. He was again returned after a contest at the 1780 general election. He was in poor health from the summer of 1781 and was abroad at the beginning of 1782.

Bridgeman died unmarried in July 1782. His brother Orlando succeeded to his father's titles.

Parliament of Great Britain
Preceded by George Byng; John Morton	Member of Parliament for Wigan; 1780–1782; With: George Byng; Hon. Horatio Walpole	Succeeded by Hon. Horatio Walpole; John Cotes
