= 1st Earl of Orford =

The Earl of Orford is a title that has been created thrice in British history. The first Earl may refer to:

- Edward Russell, 1st Earl of Orford (1653–1727), Royal Navy officer
- Robert Walpole (1676–1745), later the Earl of Orford, British statesman
- Horatio Walpole, 1st Earl of Orford (1723–1809), British Whig politician
