= Baron Wise =

Barony in the Peerage of the United Kingdom

Baron Wise, of King's Lynn in the County of Norfolk, is a title in the Peerage of the United Kingdom. It was created on 24 December 1951 for the Labour politician Frederick Wise. He had previously represented King's Lynn in the House of Commons. As of 2012 the title is held by his grandson, the third Baron, who succeeded in 2012. This is the latest extant hereditary peerage created on the recommendation of a Labour government.

== Barons Wise (1951) ==
- Frederick John Wise, 1st Baron Wise (1887–1968)
- John Clayton Wise, 2nd Baron Wise (1923–2012)
- Christopher John Clayton Wise, 3rd Baron Wise (born 1949)

The heir apparent is the present holder's elder son the Hon. Thomas Christopher C, Wise (born 1989). A younger son, Hilary Archibald Frederick Wise, was born in 1990.
