= Orlando Bridgeman, 1st Earl of Bradford =

British peer and politician (1762–1825)

The Earl of Bradford
- Earl of Bradford
- Blazon Arms: Sable, ten plates, four, three, two, and one, on a chief argent a lion passant ermines. Crest: A demi-lion rampant argent holding between the paws a wreath of laurel proper. Supporters: Two leopards, guardant gules pelletée. Motto: Nec temere, nec I timide (Neither rashley nor timidly).
- Tenure: 30 November 1815 – 7 September 1825
- Successor: George Bridgeman, 2nd Earl
- Other titles: 1st Viscount Newport; 2nd Baron Bradford; 6th Baronet Bridgeman of Great Lever
- Born: 19 March 1762
- Died: 7 September 1825 (aged 63)
- Spouse: Lucy Elizabeth Byng
- Issue: George Bridgeman, 2nd Earl of Bradford; Hon. Charles Bridgeman; Lady Lucy Whitmore; Hon. Orlando Bridgeman; Hon. Henry Bridgeman
- Parents: Henry Bridgeman, 1st Baron Bradford; Elizabeth Simpson

Orlando Bridgeman, 1st Earl of Bradford (19 March 1762 – 7 September 1825) was a British peer and politician who sat in the House of Commons from 1784 to 1800.

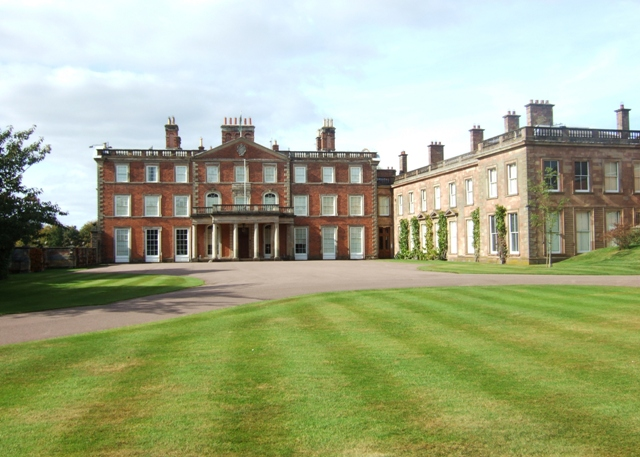
Weston Park

== Early life ==
Bridgeman was the son of the 1st Baron Bradford and his wife Elizabeth Simpson, daughter of Reverend John Simpson. He was educated at Harrow School, London, and at Trinity College, Cambridge.

== Career ==
At the 1784 general election, Bridgeman was returned unopposed as Member of Parliament (MP) for Wigan. He was returned unopposed for Wigan again in 1790 and 1796. His elder brother Henry Simpson Bridgeman had died in 1782 so he succeeded to his father's titles on 5 June 1800 and vacated his seat in the House of Commons.

In October 1800 he raised a Troop at Weston for the Staffordshire Yeomanry and commanded it as Captain until 1804.

On 30 November 1815, he was made Viscount Newport, in the County of Shropshire and Earl of Bradford, in the County of Shropshire. Bradford died aged 63 in Weston Park in Staffordshire.

== Personal life ==
Lord Bradford married Hon. Lucy Elizabeth Byng, daughter of the 4th Viscount Torrington, on 29 May 1788. They had four sons and a daughter:

- George Augustus Frederick Henry Bridgeman, 2nd Earl of Bradford (1789–1865), who married twice.
- Hon. Charles Orlando Bridgeman (1791–1860), a Vice-Admiral in the Royal Navy who married Eliza Caroline Chamberlain, daughter of Sir Henry Chamberlain, 1st Baronet, in 1819.
- Lady Lucy Georgiana Elizabeth Whitmore (1792–1840), who married William Wolryche-Whitmore.
- Hon. Orlando Henry Bridgeman (1794–1827), who married Lady Selina Needham, daughter of the 5th Earl of Kilmorey, in 1817.
- Hon. Henry Edmund Bridgeman (1795–1872), a reverend who married his cousin Louisa Elizabeth Simpson, daughter of Hon. John Simpson, the son of the 1st Baron Bradford (but took the name of Simpson in 1785), in 1820.

Lord Bradford died on 7 September 1825 and was succeeded in his titles by his eldest son George.

Parliament of Great Britain
Preceded by John Cotes; Horatio Walpole	Member of Parliament for Wigan; 1784–1800; With: John Cotes	Succeeded by John Cotes; George William Gunning
Peerage of the United Kingdom
New creation	Earl of Bradford; 2nd creation 1815–1825	Succeeded by George Bridgeman
Peerage of Great Britain
Preceded by Henry Bridgeman	Baron Bradford; 1800–1825	Succeeded by George Bridgeman
