= Charles Orlando Bridgeman =

British Royal Navy officer (1791–1860)

Vice-Admiral The Honourable Charles Orlando Bridgeman
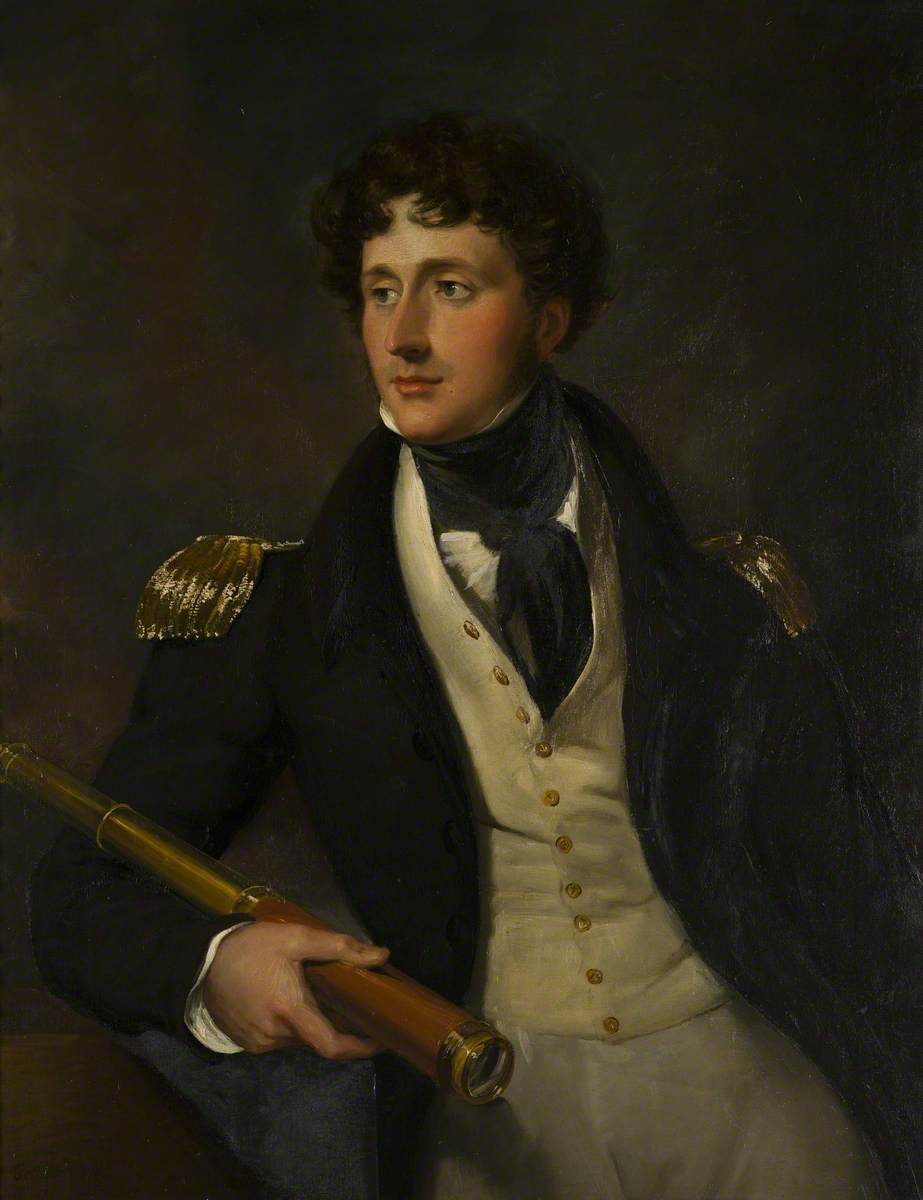
- Bridgeman as a captain, by George Hayter
- Born: 5 February 1791
- Died: 13 April 1860 (aged 69)
- Spouse: Elizabeth Chamberlain (m. 1819)
- Military career
- Allegiance: United Kingdom
- Branch: Royal Navy
- Service years: 1804–1846
- Rank: Vice-Admiral
- Commands: HMS Badger; HMS Icarus; HMS Rattlesnake
- Conflicts: Napoleonic Wars; Battle of Cape Finisterre; Dardanelles operation; Walcheren campaign; Siege of Cádiz; Invasion of Guadeloupe

Vice-Admiral Charles Orlando Bridgeman (5 February 1791 – 13 April 1860) was a Royal Navy officer who saw active service in the Napoleonic Wars and the Greek War of Independence.

== Life ==
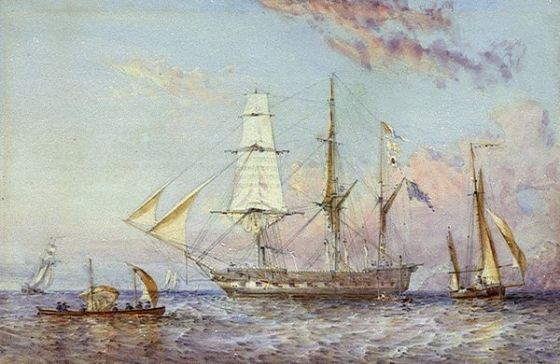
Bridgeman's final command, Rattlesnake, painted by Oswald Walters Brierly

Bridgeman was a younger son of Orlando Bridgeman, 1st Earl of Bradford, by his marriage to Lucy Elizabeth Byng, daughter of George Byng, 4th Viscount Torrington and Lady Lucy Boyle, a daughter of John Boyle, 5th Earl of Cork. His siblings were: George Bridgeman, 2nd Earl of Bradford, Lady Lucy Whitmore, Hon. Orlando Henry Bridgeman, and Reverend Hon. Henry Edmund Bridgeman. He was educated at Harrow. On 18 June 1804, at the age of thirteen, he joined the navy as a first class volunteer on the almost-new HMS Repulse.

In 1805, Bridgeman was rated as a midshipman, and during the Napoleonic Wars, he saw active service on blockade duty with Robert Calder, later serving in the Dardanelles Operation of 1807 and in the expedition to the Scheldt. In November 1809 he joined HMS Manilla under Captain George Francis Seymour, and on 10 September 1810 was promoted lieutenant in HMS Semiramis. On 1 May 1811 he transferred to HMS Revenge as Flag-Lieutenant to Rear Admiral Arthur Kaye Legge and served at the defence of Cádiz. On 8 March 1813 he joined HMS Bellerophon and on 2 April 1814 the king's yacht HMS Royal Sovereign. He commanded HMS Badger from 12 December 1814 until 28 August 1816, on the West India station, taking part in the invasion of Guadeloupe of 1815. His next command was Icarus, a ten-gun brig-sloop, from 24 June 1817 until 2 September 1819, on the South America station. In 1819 he was promoted captain. His last command, from 7 September 1827 to May 1830, was HMS Rattlesnake, attached to a squadron in the Mediterranean. For most of the years 1827 to 1829 Rattlesnake was cruising off the coasts of Greece during the Greek War of Independence. Her log for the period, kept by Talavera Vernon Anson, survives in a collection at the New York Public Library.

Bridgeman took retirement from the navy on 1 October 1846, joining the Reserved List on half-pay. He was later (10 September 1857) promoted to Vice-Admiral on the Retired List. In retirement he lived at Knockin Hall, Shropshire. When he died in April 1860 aged 69, he was still "of Knockin Hall" and left an estate worth about £16,000.

== Marriage and descendants ==
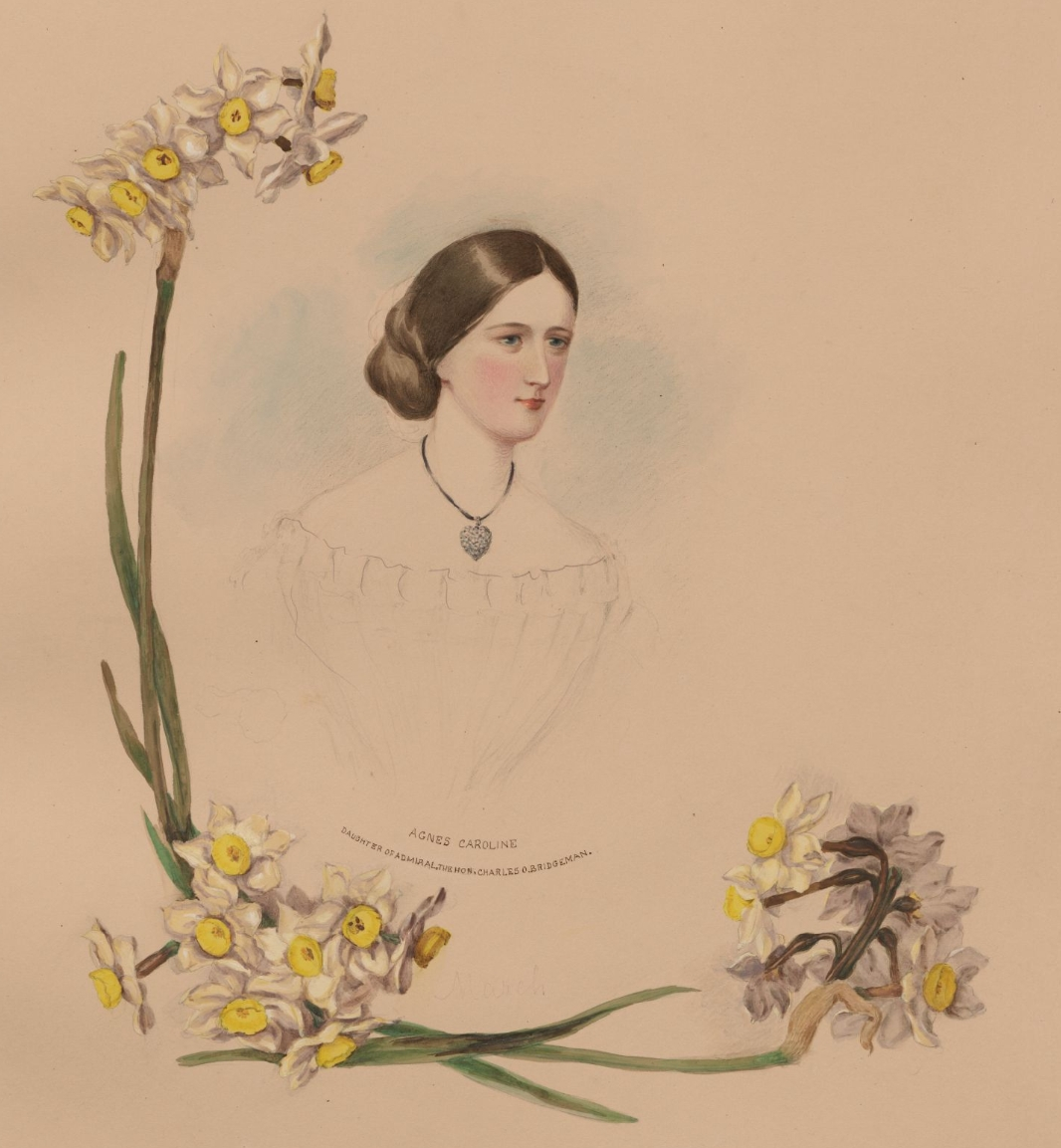
Caroline Elizabeth Anne Agnes Bridgeman before 1854

On 2 January 1819, Bridgeman married Eliza Caroline Chamberlain, a daughter of Sir Henry Chamberlain, 1st Baronet. They had eight children:

- Charles Orlando Henry Bridgeman (23 August 1821 – 11 May 1847) died at Danapur, Bengal while serving in the EIC Military Service
- Ursula Lucy Grace Bridgeman (22 May 1823 – 13 November 1883), married firstly in 1847 Albert Denison, 1st Baron Londesborough, a younger son of Henry Conyngham, 1st Marquess Conyngham. In 1861 she married secondly Lord Otho FitzGerald, a younger son of Augustus FitzGerald, 3rd Duke of Leinster. Her children were Captain Henry Charles Denison (1849–1936), Commander Conyngham Albert Denison (1851–1938), Harold Albert Denison (1856–1948), Evelyn Albert Denison (1859–1933), Major Gerald Otho FitzGerald (1862–1919), and Ina Blanche Georgie FitzGerald (1864–1910).
- Rev. Edmund Wolryche Orlando Bridgeman (24 January 1825 – 25 December 1897), married in 1853 Lilla Frances Richards. They had four daughters who all died unmarried: Ursula Judith (8 January 1855 – 7 March 1936), Maude (25 February 1857 – 6 May 1937), Gladys (born and died October 1857) and Dorothy (9 August 1861 – 8 April 1937).
- Emily Louisa Gertrude Bridgeman (16 September 1826 – 6 September 1916), married in 1859 Lt.-Col. Francis Beckford Ward, son of Rev. John Ward
- Cpt. Orlando Frederick Cavendish Bridgeman (16 July 1831 – 19 December 1858), 2nd Dragoon Guards, died at Alexandria
- Caroline Elizabeth Anne Agnes Bridgeman (23 March 1833 – 13 August 1914), married Sir Vincent Rowland Corbet, 3rd Baronet in 1854. Their children were Judith Elizabeth Corbet (died 1948) and Sir Walter Orlando Corbet, 4th Baronet (1856–1910).
- Charlotte Sobieski Isabel Bridgeman (20 May 1835 – 13 June 1914), married Leopold Cust, son of Edward Cust, in 1863, and in 1876 her father-in-law was created a Baronet. In 1878, her husband succeeded him as second Baronet. She was appointed as a Lady of the Royal Order of Victoria and Albert. Her daughter Aleen Cust was the first woman to become a veterinary surgeon.
- Katrine Selina Bridgeman (2 October 1837 – 6 December 1915), married in 1863 Arthur Philip Lloyd
