= Henry Bellingham, Baron Bellingham =

British politician

The Right Honourable The Lord Bellingham
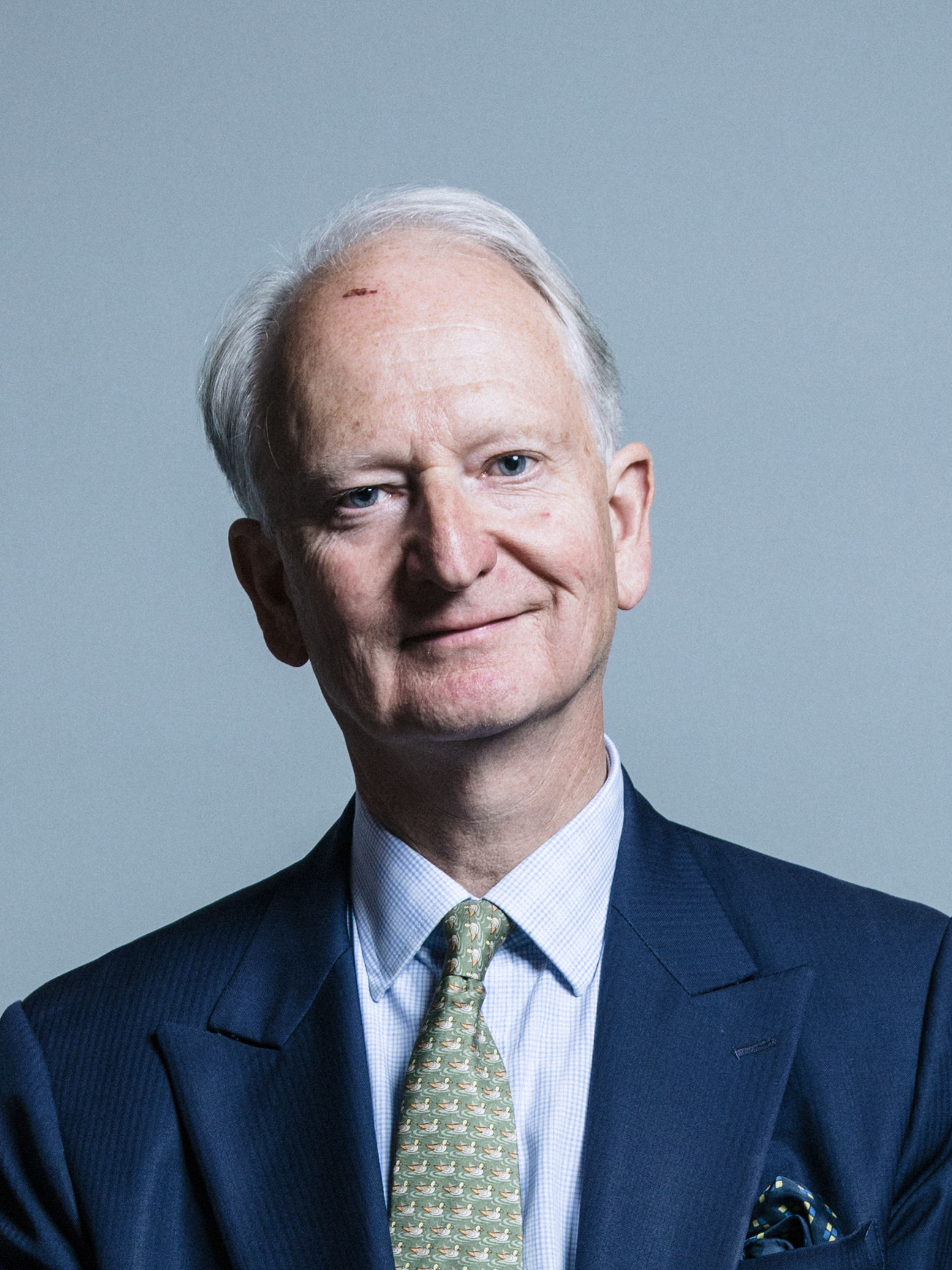
- Official portrait, 2017

Parliamentary Under-Secretary of State for Africa
- In office 11 May 2010 – 5 September 2012
- Prime Minister: David Cameron
- Preceded by: The Baroness Kinnock of Holyhead
- Succeeded by: Mark Simmonds

Parliamentary Under-Secretary of State for Asia and the Pacific
- In office 11 May 2010 – 5 September 2012
- Prime Minister: David Cameron
- Preceded by: Chris Bryant (Note: As Parliamentary Under-Secretary of State for Europe and Asia.)
- Succeeded by: Mark Simmonds

Member of the House of Lords
- Lord Temporal
- Life peerage 5 November 2020

Member of Parliament for North West Norfolk
- In office 7 June 2001 – 6 November 2019
- Preceded by: George Turner
- Succeeded by: James Wild
- In office 9 June 1983 – 8 April 1997
- Preceded by: Christopher Brocklebank-Fowler
- Succeeded by: George Turner

Shadow portfolios
- 2002–2003: Shadow Minister for Trade and Industry
- 2002–2005: Shadow Minister for Economic Affairs
- 2005–2006: Opposition Whip
- 2006–2010: Shadow Minister for Constitutional Affairs and Justice

Personal details
- Born: 29 March 1955 (age 71) Cheltenham, Gloucestershire, England
- Party: Conservative
- Spouse: Emma Whiteley
- Education: Magdalene College, Cambridge
- Website: henrybellingham.com parliament..henry-bellingham

Henry Campbell Bellingham, Baron Bellingham (born 29 March 1955) is a British Conservative politician who sits in the House of Lords and former barrister. He was first elected as the Member of Parliament (MP) for North West Norfolk in 1983. He lost his seat in 1997, but regained it in 2001 and retained it until standing down in 2019.

He was appointed Parliamentary Under-Secretary of State for Asia and the Pacific on 14 May 2010, a position he held until 5 September 2012.

== Early life ==
Bellingham was born on 29 March 1955 in Cheltenham, Gloucestershire, the son of Henry Bellingham and his wife Emma Whiteley. He was privately educated at Wellesley House School in the town of Broadstairs in Kent, followed by Eton College in Berkshire. He went on to study at Magdalene College, Cambridge, where he received a law degree in 1977. During his time at Cambridge, he was a member of Cambridge University Liberal Club and served as Joint Master of the Cambridge University Draghounds.

Bellingham also took a short service commission in the Guards for a year between school and university. He trained at the Inns of Court School of Law, and joined the Middle Temple in 1978 and practised as a barrister for eight years.

Bellingham is variously described as a direct descendant of John Bellingham, Spencer Perceval's assassin, or as being from the same family. In 1997 The Independent noted the historical coincidence that the general election candidate for the Referendum Party, Roger Percival, claimed to be a descendant of the slain Prime Minister. The paper had correctly predicted that Percival's intervention could hand the seat to Labour.

== Parliamentary career ==
Bellingham first entered Parliament at the 1983 election after winning the seat for North West Norfolk, having defeated the incumbent MP Christopher Brocklebank-Fowler, who in 1981 was the only Conservative to defect to the newly formed SDP. He held his seat until being defeated during the 1997 election. He contested his former seat at the election in 2001, and won it back. He was re-elected in 2005 with a 9000 vote majority, and again in 2010 with a majority of 14,810. He was re-elected at the 2015 general election and 2017 general election.

Bellingham was appointed as a Shadow Minister for Trade and Industry in July 2002, before becoming an Opposition Whip in May 2005. From November 2006 until the 2010 general election he was a Shadow Minister for the Department of Constitutional Affairs. He won the North West Norfolk seat in the 2010 election, and was appointed a Parliamentary Under-Secretary in the coalition government within the Foreign and Commonwealth Office covering; 'Overseas Territories, Africa, United Nations, economic issues, conflict resolution and climate change'.

In 2009, whilst debating the Queen's speech, he was described as "looking uncomfortable" when MPs joked about his distant ancestor John Bellingham, who assassinated Spencer Perceval. Bellingham later stated: "I wouldn't bring it up in conversation that I'm a descendant—or a near-descendant—of a murderer of a prime minister. But I don't try to deny it".

In 2011, he abstained on the military intervention in Libya.

On 29 September 2011, while quoting Bellingham, the Antigua Observer described him as the United Kingdom's Minister of Overseas Territories.

While in Antigua, Bellingham had commented on the surprise decision of former Premier of Bermuda Ewart Brown to provide asylum to four former Uyghur captives in Guantanamo.

This is something that we weren't consulted on by the last (Brown) administration. We have spoken to the United States about it—it's our understanding that the arrangement was not to be permanent and we're looking to the US State Department to find a permanent solution. We're working with them to try and achieve that.

Bellingham became vice-chairman of the All-Party Parliamentary Group on Speedway Racing in July 2015.

In Parliament, he was a member of the Panel of Chairs, the Environment Committee, the Northern Ireland Affairs Committee, the Trade & Industry Committee and the High Speed Rail (London–West Midlands) Bill Committee.

Bellingham stood down from parliament in the 2019 general election, telling his constituents he had "agonised" over the decision.

== Business interests ==
In 2014, a mining company called Pathfinder Minerals appointed Bellingham as non-executive chairman 18 months after he stopped being Minister for Africa. It was reported that Bellingham was earning £4,000 per month for his work with Pathfinder and that he had lobbied on their behalf whilst working as Minister for Africa. The Daily Telegraph reported that the case raised concerns 'of a revolving door between Whitehall and the private sector, with ministers benefiting from contacts they made in office'. However, there was no suggestion of wrongdoing, and all the work had been declared in line with Parliamentary rules.

As a backbench MP, Bellingham was paid £6,448.25 per month. In The Register of Members' Financial Interests on 21 January 2019, Bellingham declared additional income amounting to £9,583 per month from four jobs:

- Non-executive director of Developing Markets Associates Ltd, a global consultancy and investment conference organiser – £2,500 a month
- Non-executive chairman of Pathfinder Minerals PLC, an AIM listed mining company – £2,083 per month
- Senior Adviser to J. Stern & Co. LLP, a fund management company – £2,500 per month
- Non-executive chairman of Clifton Africa Ltd, a private company specialising in housing and infrastructure construction in developing countries – £2,500 per month

== Personal life ==
Bellingham lives in Congham, which is situated within his former constituency, and London. He married Emma Whiteley in August 1993 in Horsham, and they have one son.

Bellingham employed his wife as his Parliamentary Assistant. The practice of MPs employing family members has been criticised by some sections of the media on the lines that it promotes nepotism. Although MPs who were first elected in 2017 were banned from employing family members, the restriction was not retrospective – meaning that Bellingham's employment of his wife was lawful.

== Honours ==
Bellingham was knighted in the 2016 New Year Honours for political and parliamentary service by Prime Minister David Cameron.

He was awarded a life peerage in 2020 by Prime Minister Boris Johnson. He was created Baron Bellingham, of Congham in the County of Norfolk, on 5 November. He made his maiden speech in the budget debate in the Lords on 12 March 2021.

== See also ==
- Bellingham baronets

== Notes ==
Parliament of the United Kingdom
Preceded by Christopher Brocklebank-Fowler	Member of Parliament for North West Norfolk; 1983–1997	Succeeded by George Turner
Preceded by George Turner	Member of Parliament for North West Norfolk; 2001–2019	Succeeded by James Wild
Orders of precedence in the United Kingdom
Preceded by The Lord Woodley	Gentlemen; Baron Bellingham	Followed by The Lord Stewart of Dirleton
