= Thomas Oxborough =

English lawyer and politician

Thomas Oxborough (died 30 December 1623) was an English lawyer and politician who sat in the House of Commons at various times between 1586 and 1614.

Oxborough was the son of Thomas Oxborough of Beckham Well. He entered Lincoln's Inn in 1572 and was called to the bar in 1581. He was town clerk of King's Lynn from 1584 to 1597. In 1586, he was elected Member of Parliament for King's Lynn. He was a commissioner for sewers for Ely in 1594 and was a J.P. for Norfolk from about 1596. In 1597 he was elected MP for King's Lynn again. He was also recorder of King's Lynn and commissioner for sewers for Lincolnshire and Norfolk from 1597. In 1601 he was re-elected MP for King's Lynn. He was re-elected MP for King's Lynn in 1604 and 1614.

Oxborough died in 1623 leaving lands in King's Lynn, Tilney, Middleton, Terrington St Johns, and Islington.

Oxborough married firstly Thomasine Heward, daughter of Thomas Heward of Oxborough and had four sons and three daughters. He married secondly Margaret Cartwright, widow of Patrick Cartwright of King's Lynn and daughter of Richard Slyford of Slyford, Lincolnshire.

Parliament of England
Preceded by John Peyton; Richard Clarke	Member of Parliament for King's Lynn; 1586; With: Richard Clarke	Succeeded by Richard Clarke; Thomas Boston
Preceded by Sir John Peyton; William Lewis	Member of Parliament for King's Lynn; 1597–1614; With: Nathaniel Bacon 1597; Sir Robert Mansell 1601; Robert Hitcham 1604–1611; Matthew Clerke 1614	Succeeded by Matthew Clerke; John Wallis
