= Thomas Morton (MP for Bishop's Lynn) =

English Member of Parliament

Thomas Morton (c. 1336 – 1394 or after), of Bishop's Lynn, Norfolk, was an English Member of Parliament (MP).

He was a Member of the Parliament of England for King's Lynn in January 1377, October 1377, 1378, January 1380, October 1382, November 1384, 1385, 1386, February 1388, 1393 and 1394.
