= John Henry Gurney Sr. =

English banker, politician, and amateur ornithologist (1819–1890)

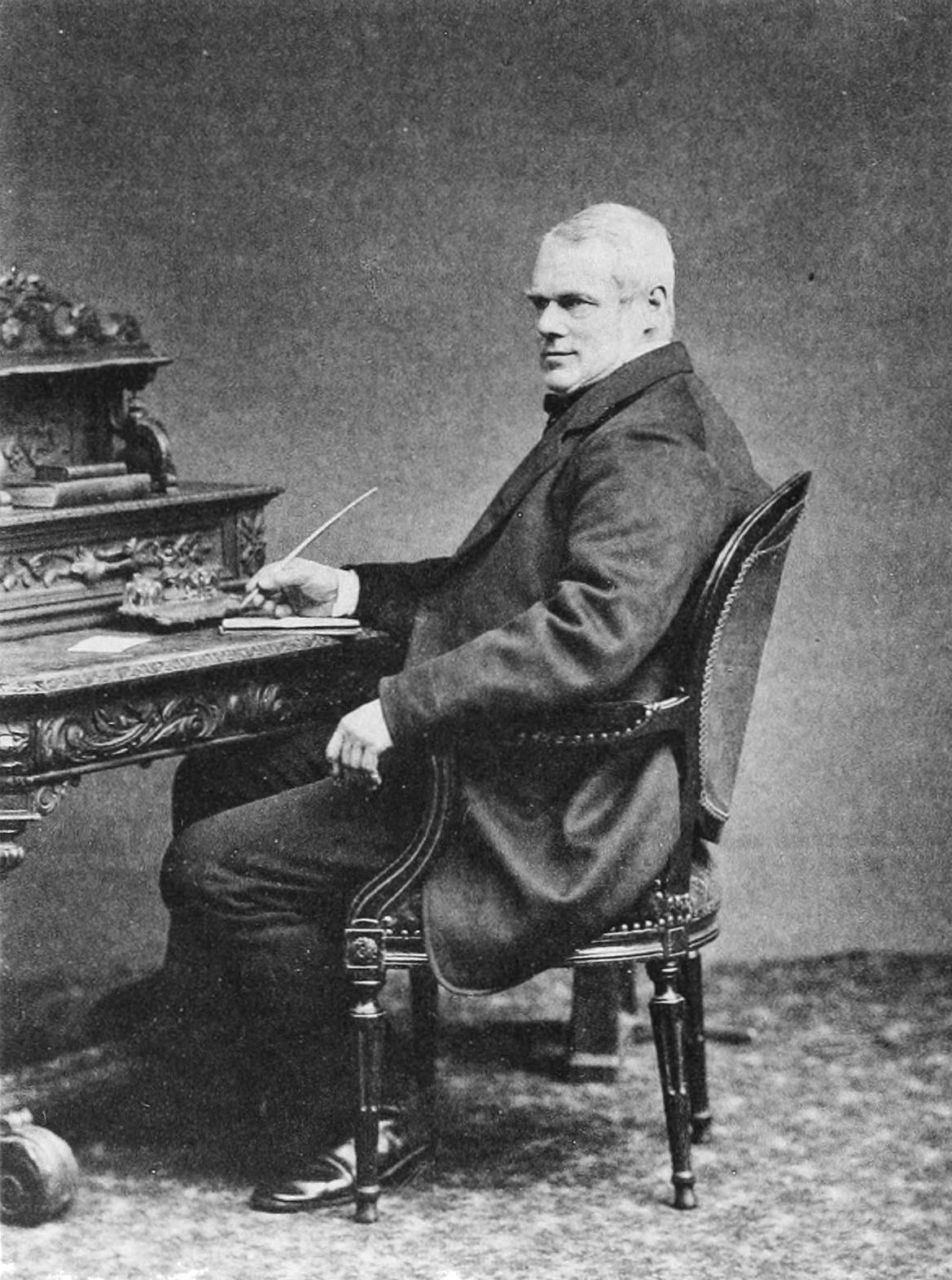
- Born: 4 July 1819
- Died: 20 April 1890 (aged 70)

John Henry Gurney (4 July 1819 – 20 April 1890) was an English banker, amateur ornithologist, and Liberal Party politician of the Gurney family.

== Life ==
Gurney was the only son of Joseph John Gurney of Earlham Hall, Norwich, Norfolk. At the age of ten he was sent to a private tutor at Leytonstone near the Epping Forest, where he met Henry Doubleday, and commenced his first natural history collection. From there he moved to the Friends' School at Tottenham, and whilst there met William Yarrell. At the age of seventeen he joined the family's banking business in Norwich.

Gurney published a number of articles in The Zoologist on the birds of Norfolk, for instance 'An Account of the Birds of Norfolk', with W.R. Fisher (1846-1848). Gurney also commenced a collection of birds of prey. In 1864 he published Part I. of his Descriptive Catalogue of this collection, and in 1872 he edited The Birds of Damara Land (Damaraland, South-West Africa) from the notes of his friend Charles John Andersson.

Between 1875 and 1882 he produced a series of notes in The Ibis on the first volume of the Catalogue of Birds in the British Museum, and in 1884 brought out a List of Diurnal Birds of Prey, with References and Annotations. The archives of Cambridge University Museum of Zoology contains five volumes of correspondence between Alfred Newton and Gurney, who was a founding member of the Norfolk Naturalists Trust.

For the last twenty years of his life he resided at the family's home at Northrepps, near Cromer.

His son, John Henry Gurney Jr., was also an ornithologist, and his great-great-grandson, Henry Richard Gurney of Heggatt Hall has continued the family tradition.

The southern African race of the black-necked grebe, Podiceps nigricollis gurneyi, was named by South African zoologist and author Austin Roberts in 1919 in honour of the father and son.

John Henry Gurney Jr.'s daughter Agatha Gurney (1881–1937) married Sir Edward Ruggles-Brise, 1st Baronet. He was appointed a High Sheriff of Norfolk.

== Political career ==
He was elected unopposed as Member of Parliament (MP) for King's Lynn at a by-election in 1854, and was re-elected unopposed in 1857 and 1859. He stood down from the House of Commons at the 1865 general election.

== Sources ==
- Mullens, William Herbert; Swann, Harry Kirke (1917). Bibliography of British Ornithology from the Earliest Times to the End of 1912, Including Biographical Accounts of the Principal Writers and Bibliographies of their Published Works. London: Macmillan.
- Hansard 1803–2005: contributions in Parliament by John Henry Gurney

Parliament of the United Kingdom
Preceded by Viscount Jocelyn; Lord Stanley	Member of Parliament for King's Lynn; 1854 – 1865; With: Lord Stanley	Succeeded by Sir Thomas Fowell Buxton; Lord Stanley
