= Thomas Derham =

English politician

Thomas Derham (died 1444 or 1445) was a member (MP) of the parliament of England for Bishop's Lynn in 1406.
