= Derek Page, Baron Whaddon =

The Right Honourable The Lord Whaddon

Member of the House of Lords
- Lord Temporal
- Life peerage 26 April 1978 – 16 August 2005

Personal details
- Born: 14 August 1927
- Died: 16 August 2005 (aged 78)

John Derek Page, Baron Whaddon (14 August 1927 – 16 August 2005), was a British politician and export agent/consultant.

== Background ==
Derek Page, as he was usually known, was born the son of a lorry driver in Sale, Greater Manchester. He was educated at St Bede's College, Manchester, and the University of London, where he graduated with a Bachelor of Science in chemistry. Page was Director of the Cambridge Chemical Co. from 1962 and of Rindalbourne Ltd. from 1983 to 1990. He was also Chairman of Daltrade Ltd. from 1983, and of Skorimpex-Rind from 1986.

In 1964, he became Labour Member of Parliament (MP) for Kings Lynn, and held this seat until 1970, when he lost to the Conservative candidate Christopher Brocklebank-Fowler (who would later join the SDP). He refought Brocklebank-Fowler for the changed seat of North West Norfolk in February 1974 but was again defeated. Later he left Labour and himself defected to the SDP, but rejoined in 1994.

== Peerage ==
On 26 April 1978, Page was created a life peer with the title Baron Whaddon, of Whaddon in the County of Cambridgeshire. In 1989, he was awarded the Golden Insignia of the Order of Merit by Poland.

== Family ==
He was married firstly to Catherine Audrey Halls from 1948 until her death in 1979; they had two children. He married, secondly, to Angela Rixson in 1981, and they were married until his death.

== Death ==
Lord Whaddon died two days after his 78th birthday on 16 August 2005.

== Arms ==
Coat of arms of Derek Page, Baron Whaddon

Crest
Upon a wreath Or Vert and Gules a crown vallary Or issuing therefrom within a chaplet Vert set with roses Gules barbed and seeded Proper a triple trefoil slipped Vert.
Escutcheon
Quarterly Vert and Or on a fess engrailed Ermine between in dexter chief a mullet and in sinister base a harp Or and in sinister chief and dexter base a rose Gules barbed and seeded Proper three garbs Gold.
Supporters
Dexter a lion guardant Proper winged Or sinister a mermaid Proper crined and with a tail fin Or a round shield with its boss Gold on her forearm and holding in the hand Proper a sword point upward Argent hilt pommel and quillons Gold.
Motto
Caveat Qui Certus Est (Take Care That You Are Right)

Parliament of the United Kingdom
Preceded by Denys Bullard	Member of Parliament for Kings Lynn; 1964–1970	Succeeded by Christopher Brocklebank-Fowler
