= Frederick Wise, 1st Baron Wise =

UK politician

The Right Honourable The Lord Wise

Member of Parliament for King's Lynn
- In office 5 July 1945 – 25 October 1951
- Preceded by: Maurice Roche
- Succeeded by: Ronald Scott-Miller

Personal details
- Born: Frederick John Wise; 10 April 1887 Bury St. Edmunds, Suffolk, England
- Died: 20 November 1968 (aged 81) North Elmham, Norfolk, England
- Party: Labour
- Spouse: Kate Elizabeth Sturgeon (m. 1911)
- Relations: Frank Wise (brother)

Frederick John Wise, 1st Baron Wise (10 April 1887 – 20 November 1968), was a Labour Party politician in the United Kingdom. He was Member of Parliament (MP) for King's Lynn from 1945 to 1951. He was the younger brother of fellow Labour MP Frank Wise.

Wise came from the village of Souldern in north Oxfordshire, where he played in the local amateur football team.

He married Kate Sturgeon on 25 November 1911. The couple had three daughters and a son.

At the 1931 general election he stood in the Harborough constituency in Leicestershire. Previously a Conservative-held marginal seat, Labour's vote fell only slightly in 1931, but the Liberals did not field a candidate and Earl Castle Stewart was re-elected with 74.5% of the votes.

For the 1935 general election Wise stood in Conservative-held Lowestoft, where he was defeated again.

He finally entered Parliament at the 1945 general election, when Labour's post-war landslide help him win a majority of 3,274 votes in Conservative-held King's Lynn. He was returned again at the 1950 general election with a majority of only 270 votes, but at the next general election, in October 1951, he lost the seat by 937 votes to the Conservative Ronald Scott-Miller.

On 24 December 1951, he was elevated to the peerage as Baron Wise, of King's Lynn in the County of Norfolk. In 1953, he served as mayor of King's Lynn.

Parliament of the United Kingdom
Preceded by Lord Fermoy	Member of Parliament for King's Lynn; 1945–1951	Succeeded by Ronald Scott-Miller
Peerage of the United Kingdom
New creation	Baron Wise; 1951–1968	Succeeded by John Clayton Wise
