= John Wallis (MP for King's Lynn) =

John Wallis (c.1567–1633) was an English merchant and politician who sat in the House of Commons from 1621 to 1624.

Wallis was a merchant of King's Lynn and is recorded in 1601 as purchasing a boat for £80. He became mayor of King's Lynn in 1622 after Thomas Snelling the holder of the office died. In 1624 he was re-elected MP for King's Lynn. He was mayor of King's Lynn again in 1631.

Parliament of England
Preceded by Matthew Clerke; Thomas Oxborough	Member of Parliament for King's Lynn; 1621–1624; With: Matthew Clerke; William Doughty	Succeeded by Thomas Gurling; John Cooke
