= Matthew Clerke =

English politician (1564–1623)

Sir Matthew Clerke (1564 – 1 May 1623) was an English politician who sat in the House of Commons from 1614 to 1622.

Clerke, born in London, was the son of Richard Clerke of King's Lynn. He was admitted at Christ's College, Cambridge, on 11 April 1581. He was awarded BA in 1585 and MA in 1588. In 1605 he was mayor of Lynn. He was mayor of Lynn again in 1613. In 1614, he was elected Member of Parliament for King's Lynn. In 1622 he was re-elected MP for King's Lynn.

Clerke died at the age of 59 in 1623.

Parliament of England
Preceded by Thomas Oxborough; Robert Hitcham	Member of Parliament for King's Lynn; 1614–1622; With: Thomas Oxborough 1614; John Wallis	Succeeded by John Wallis; William Doughty
