= John de Swerdeston =

John de Swerdeston (fl. 1323–1347), was an English Member of Parliament (MP).

He was a Member of the Parliament of England for King's Lynn in 1328 and 1337. He was mayor of King's Lynn in 1323, 1324, 1327, 1329, 1331, 1336, and 1347.
