= North West Norfolk =

UK Parliament constituency (1885–1918, 1974 onwards)

Coordinates: 52.83°N 0.5°E

- County constituency for the House of Commons
- Interactive map of boundaries since 2024
- Location within the East of England
- County: Norfolk
- Electorate: 75,200 (March 2020)
- Major settlements: King's Lynn, Hunstanton, Heacham, Dersingham

Current constituency
- Created: 1974
- Member of Parliament: James Wild (Conservative)
- Seats: One
- Created from: King's Lynn

1885–1918
- Seats: One
- Created from: North Norfolk and West Norfolk
- Replaced by: King's Lynn

North West Norfolk is a constituency (Note: A county constituency (for the purposes of election expenses and type of returning officer)) represented in the House of Commons of the UK Parliament since 2019 by James Wild, a Conservative. (Note: As with all constituencies, the constituency elects one Member of Parliament (MP) by the first past the post system of election at least every five years.)

== Constituency profile ==
North West Norfolk is a constituency in Norfolk in the East of England, forming part of the King's Lynn and West Norfolk local government district. Its largest town is King's Lynn, which has a population of around 48,000. Other settlements include the town of Hunstanton and the villages of Terrington St Clement, Dersingham and Heacham.

This constituency covers low-lying coastal areas along the Wash, a shallow bay and important natural conservation area. King's Lynn was England's most important port during the mediaeval era and continues to be a centre for fishing and agricultural trade. Much of the town was redeveloped and expanded during the 1960s to accommodate overspill from London. Outside of King's Lynn, the rest of the constituency is rural with many small villages. Heacham and Hunstanton are popular seaside resorts with large holiday parks. Just south of Dersingham is Sandringham House, one of the British monarch's two private residences along with Balmoral Castle in Scotland. The constituency generally has below-average levels of wealth. Most of King's Lynn is highly-deprived, except the suburban villages in the town's north-east (North Wootton and South Wootton) which are affluent. The rural areas and coastal settlements have average rates of deprivation and wealth. House prices across the constituency are generally lower than the regional and UK averages.

North West Norfolk has a large retired population and a low proportion of young adults. Residents have low rates of household income, average levels of homeownership and an above-average rate of child poverty. They have low levels of education and a high proportion work in the health and retail sectors. The percentage of residents claiming unemployment benefits is in line with the UK-wide figure. White people made up 95% of the population at the 2021 census.

At the local district council, King's Lynn is mostly represented by Labour Party councillors, the coastal areas by Conservatives and the inland rural areas by independents. At the county council, which held elections more recently, most of the constituency's seats were won by Reform UK. Voters in North West Norfolk strongly supported leaving the European Union in the 2016 referendum; an estimated 65% voted in favour of Brexit compared to the UK-wide figure of 52%.

== History ==
Under the Redistribution of Seats Act 1885, the three two-member county divisions of Norfolk were replaced with six single-member divisions, including the newly created North-Western Division of Norfolk, largely formed from northern parts of the abolished Western Division. It was abolished at the next redistribution of seats under the provisions of the Representation of the People Act 1918, when it was largely absorbed by the expanded constituency of King's Lynn. It was re-established for the February 1974 general election, replacing the abolished King's Lynn constituency.

The present constituency includes two former Parliamentary Boroughs, those of Castle Rising, which was abolished as a 'rotten borough' in 1832, and King's Lynn, abolished in 1918.

The first MP in the re-established constituency was Christopher Brocklebank-Fowler, who had gained King's Lynn, largely a bellwether seat, from one of Harold Wilson's government colleagues in the Labour Party. He therefore effectively held the seat in the two 1974 elections, and in 1979; however, by March 1981, he became distanced from the Conservatives and defected to the newly formed Social Democratic Party shortly before the 1983 Conservative landslide, in which Brocklebank-Fowler lost his seat to the replacement Conservative candidate Henry Bellingham.

Bellingham increased his precarious lead over Brocklebank-Fowler at the 1987 general election. Therefore, at the following election, Brocklebank-Fowler chose to contest another seat (Note: South Norfolk constituency) and Labour's candidate regained second place in this constituency, almost doubling their share of the vote. Labour gained the seat at the 1997 general election; however, Bellingham regained the seat at the 2001 general election and subsequently increased his majority in both 2005 and 2010.

The 2010 election saw political party infighting when the Labour candidate for North West Norfolk, Manish Sood (Note: At the time a Leicester councillor) stated in an interview with the local newspaper Lynn News that Gordon Brown was "the worst prime minister we have had in this country". This gained national attention and resulted in Labour disowning their candidate. Sood did not attend the count and stated he would watch it from his home in Leicester. He ended up finishing third, behind Bellingham and the Liberal Democrat candidate William Summers, whose party received their best ever result in the constituency, with an 18.3% swing from Labour to the others. Labour's share of the vote fell from a winning 43.8% in the 1997 election to just 13.3% in 2010, marking the steepest decline from the start to end of the thirteen years of Labour government.

Bellingham's majority fell slightly in 2015, but he retained the seat in the 2017 general election with 60% of the vote, having been knighted in the New Year's honours list of 2016. He did not stand at the 2019 election and was succeeded as the Conservative candidate by James Wild who won the seat with a record majority of 42.7%.

Wild retained the seat at the 2024 general election with a much reduced majority of 11.1% - surviving a swing of 16.2% to Labour.

== Boundaries and boundary changes ==
=== Historic ===
==== 1885–1918 ====
- The Municipal Borough of King's Lynn; and
- The Sessional Divisions of Brothercross, Freebridge Lynn, Freebridge Marshall, and Gallow and Smithdon.

As King's Lynn formed a separate Parliamentary Borough, only non-resident freeholders of the Borough were entitled to vote in this constituency.

On abolition, the bulk of the Division was amalgamated with the abolished Parliamentary Borough of King's Lynn to form the new King's Lynn Division of Norfolk. Eastern areas, including Fakenham, were transferred to the Northern Division.

==== 1974–1983 ====
- The Municipal Borough of King's Lynn;
- The Urban Districts of Hunstanton and Wells-next-the-Sea; and
- The Rural Districts of Docking, Freebridge Lynn, Marshland, and Walsingham.

The re-established constituency was formed from the abolished constituency of King's Lynn with the addition of Wells-next-the-Sea and the Rural District of Walsingham, which included Fakenham, transferred from North Norfolk. (This area is currently in the constituencies of North Norfolk and Broadland.)

==== 1983–2010 ====
- The Borough of King's Lynn and West Norfolk wards of Burnham, Chase, Clenchwarton, Creake, Dersingham, Docking, Gayton, Gaywood Central, Gaywood North, Gaywood South, Grimston, Heacham, Hunstanton, Lynn Central, Lynn North, Lynn South West, Mershe Lande, Middleton, North Coast, Priory, Rudham, St Lawrence, St Margaret's, Snettisham, Spellowfields, The Walpoles, The Woottons, Valley Hill, West Walton, West Winch, and Wiggenhall.

Wells-next-the-Sea and areas comprising the former Rural District of Walsingham, including Fakenham, were transferred back to North Norfolk. Minor realignment of the boundary with South West Norfolk.

Map of boundaries 2010–2024

==== 2010–2024 ====
- The Borough of King's Lynn and West Norfolk wards of Brancaster, Burnham, Clenchwarton, Dersingham, Docking, Fairstead, Gayton, Gaywood Chase, Gaywood North Bank, Grimston, Heacham, Hunstanton, North Lynn, North Wootton, Old Gaywood, Priory, Rudham, St Margaret's with St Nicholas, Snettisham, South and West Lynn, South Wootton, Spellowfields, Springwood, Valley Hill, Walpole, and West Winch.

Small area transferred to South West Norfolk.

=== Current ===
Further to the 2023 review of Westminster constituencies, which came into effect for the 2024 general election, the composition of the constituency is as follows (as they existed on 1 December 2020):

- The Borough of King's Lynn and West Norfolk wards of: Bircham with Rudhams; Brancaster; Burnham Market & Docking; Clenchwarton; Dersingham; Fairstead; Gayton & Grimston; Gaywood Chase; Gaywood Clock; Gaywood North Bank; Heacham; Hunstanton; Massingham with Castle Acre; North Lynn; St. Margaret’s with St. Nicholas; Snettisham; South & West Lynn; Springwood; Terrington; The Woottons; Walsoken, West Walton & Walpole; West Winch.

Minor net gain from South West Norfolk following changes to local authority ward boundaries.

== Members of Parliament ==
=== MPs 1885–1918 ===
North Norfolk and West Norfolk prior to 1885

Election	Member	Party
1885	Joseph Arch	Liberal
1886	Lord Henry Cavendish-Bentinck	Conservative
1892	Joseph Arch	Liberal
1900	Sir George White	Liberal
1912 by-election	Edward Hemmerde	Liberal
1918	constituency abolished: see King's Lynn	

=== MPs since 1974 ===
King's Lynn prior to 1974

Election	Member	Party
Feb. 1974	Christopher Brocklebank-Fowler	Conservative
1981	Christopher Brocklebank-Fowler	SDP
1983	Henry Bellingham	Conservative
1997	George Turner	Labour
2001	Sir Henry Bellingham	Conservative
2019	James Wild	Conservative

== Elections ==
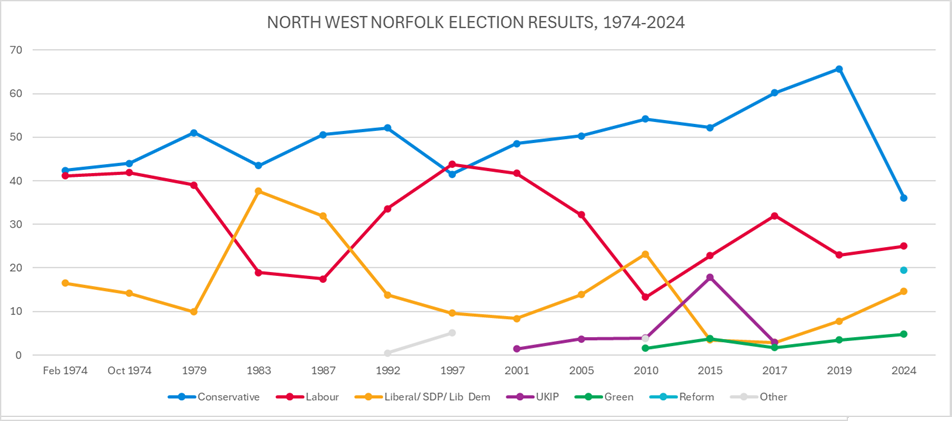
Election results 1974–2024

=== Elections in the 2020s ===
General election 2024: North West Norfolk
Party	Candidate	Votes	%	±%
Conservative	James Wild	16,097	36.1	−29.9
Labour	Tim Leaver	11,143	25.0	+2.4
Reform	Phil Walton	8,697	19.5	N/A
Liberal Democrats	Rob Colwell	6,492	14.6	+6.8
Green	Michael de Whalley	2,137	4.8	+1.3
Majority		4,954	11.1	−32.3
Turnout		44,566	59.9	−4.7
Registered electors		74,415		
Conservative hold		Swing	−16.2	

=== Elections in the 2010s ===
2019 notional result
Party	Vote	%
Conservative	32,075	66.0
Labour	10,998	22.6
Liberal Democrats	3,779	7.8
Green	1,717	3.5
Turnout	48,569	64.6
Electorate	75,200	

General election 2019: North West Norfolk
Party	Candidate	Votes	%	±%
Conservative	James Wild	30,627	65.7	+5.5
Labour	Joanne Rust	10,705	23.0	−9.0
Liberal Democrats	Rob Colwell	3,625	7.8	+4.9
Green	Michael De Whalley	1,645	3.5	+1.8
Majority		19,922	42.7	+14.5
Turnout		46,602	64.7	−3.0
Conservative hold		Swing	+7.25	

General election 2017: North West Norfolk
Party	Candidate	Votes	%	±%
Conservative	Henry Bellingham	29,408	60.2	+8.0
Labour	Joanne Rust	15,620	32.0	+9.2
UKIP	Michael Stone	1,539	2.9	−14.9
Liberal Democrats	Rupert Moss-Eccardt	1,393	2.9	−0.6
Green	Michael de Whalley	851	1.7	−2.1
Majority		13,788	28.2	−1.2
Turnout		48,811	67.7	+2.3
Conservative hold		Swing	−0.5	

General election 2015: North West Norfolk
Party	Candidate	Votes	%	±%
Conservative	Henry Bellingham	24,727	52.2	−2.0
Labour	Joanne Rust	10,779	22.8	+9.5
UKIP	Toby Coke	8,412	17.8	+13.9
Green	Michael de Whalley	1,780	3.8	+2.2
Liberal Democrats	Hugh Lanham	1,673	3.5	−19.7
Majority		13,948	29.4	−1.6
Turnout		47,597	65.4	+0.1
Conservative hold		Swing	−3.75	

General election 2010: North West Norfolk
Party	Candidate	Votes	%	±%
Conservative	Henry Bellingham	25,916	54.2	+4.3
Liberal Democrats	William Summers	11,106	23.2	+8.5
Labour	Manish Sood	6,353	13.3	−18.3
UKIP	John Gray	1,841	3.9	+0.2
BNP	David Fleming	1,839	3.8	N/A
Green	Mike de Whalley	745	1.6	N/A
Majority		14,810	31.0	+12.9
Turnout		47,800	65.3	+3.7
Conservative hold		Swing	−2.1	

=== Elections in the 2000s ===
General election 2005: North West Norfolk
Party	Candidate	Votes	%	±%
Conservative	Henry Bellingham	25,471	50.3	+1.8
Labour	Damien Welfare	16,291	32.2	−9.5
Liberal Democrats	Simon Higginson	7,026	13.9	+5.5
UKIP	Michael Stone	1,861	3.7	+2.3
Majority		9,180	18.1	+11.3
Turnout		50,649	61.6	−3.5
Conservative hold		Swing	+5.7	

General election 2001: North West Norfolk
Party	Candidate	Votes	%	±%
Conservative	Henry Bellingham	24,846	48.5	+7.0
Labour	George Turner	21,361	41.7	−2.1
Liberal Democrats	Ian Mack	4,292	8.4	−1.2
UKIP	Ian Durrant	704	1.4	N/A
Majority		3,485	6.8	N/A
Turnout		51,203	65.1	−9.6
Conservative gain from Labour		Swing		

=== Elections in the 1990s ===
General election 1997: North West Norfolk
Party	Candidate	Votes	%	±%
Labour	George Turner	25,250	43.8	+10.2
Conservative	Henry Bellingham	23,911	41.5	−10.6
Liberal Democrats	Evelyn Knowles	5,513	9.6	−4.2
Referendum	Roger Percival	2,923	5.1	N/A
Majority		1,339	2.3	N/A
Turnout		57,597	74.7	−6.0
Labour gain from Conservative		Swing	+10.4	

General election 1992: North West Norfolk
Party	Candidate	Votes	%	±%
Conservative	Henry Bellingham	32,554	52.1	+1.5
Labour	George Turner	20,990	33.6	+16.1
Liberal Democrats	AM Waterman	8,599	13.8	−18.1
Natural Law	SRA Pink	330	0.5	N/A
Majority		11,564	18.5	−0.2
Turnout		62,473	80.7	+1.9
Conservative hold		Swing	−7.3	

=== Elections in the 1980s ===
General election 1987: North West Norfolk
Party	Candidate	Votes	%	±%
Conservative	Henry Bellingham	29,393	50.6	+7.1
SDP	Christopher Brocklebank-Fowler	18,568	31.9	−5.7
Labour	Frank Dignan	10,184	17.5	−1.4
Majority		10,825	18.7	+12.8
Turnout		58,145	78.9	+1.3
Conservative hold		Swing	+6.4	

General election 1983: North West Norfolk
Party	Candidate	Votes	%	±%
Conservative	Henry Bellingham	23,358	43.5	−6.5
SDP	Christopher Brocklebank-Fowler	20,211	37.6	N/A
Labour	Mike Tilbury	10,139	18.9	−20.1
Majority		3,147	5.9	−6.1
Turnout		53,708	77.6	−1.5
Conservative hold		Swing		

=== Elections in the 1970s ===
General election 1979: North West Norfolk
Party	Candidate	Votes	%	±%
Conservative	Christopher Brocklebank-Fowler	33,796	51.01	
Labour	RL Williams	25,868	39.04	
Liberal	M Mynott	6,588	9.94	
Majority		7,928	11.97	
Turnout		66,252	79.15	
Conservative hold		Swing		

General election October 1974: North West Norfolk
Party	Candidate	Votes	%	±%
Conservative	Christopher Brocklebank-Fowler	27,513	43.99	
Labour	RL Williams	26,170	41.84	
Liberal	RA Walker	8,862	14.17	
Majority		1,343	2.15	
Turnout		62,545	78.43	
Conservative hold		Swing		

General election February 1974: North West Norfolk
Party	Candidate	Votes	%	±%
Conservative	Christopher Brocklebank-Fowler	27,823	42.35	
Labour	Derek Page	27,020	41.13	
Liberal	RA Walker	10,852	16.52	
Majority		803	1.22	
Turnout		65,695	83.07	
Conservative win (new seat)				

=== Elections in the 1910s ===
Edward Hemmerde

1912 North West Norfolk by-election
Party	Candidate	Votes	%	±%
Liberal	Edward Hemmerde	5,613	53.1	−2.8
Conservative	Neville Jodrell	4,965	46.9	+2.8
Majority		648	6.2	−5.6
Turnout		10,578	87.7	+4.4
Liberal hold		Swing	−2.8	

General election December 1910: North West Norfolk
Party	Candidate	Votes	%	±%
Liberal	George White	5,407	55.9	−0.1
Conservative	Neville Jodrell	4,264	44.1	+0.1
Majority		1,143	11.8	−0.2
Turnout		9,671	83.3	−2.7
Liberal hold		Swing	−0.1	

General election January 1910: North West Norfolk
Party	Candidate	Votes	%	±%
Liberal	George White	5,596	56.0	−10.0
Conservative	Neville Jodrell	4,388	44.0	+10.0
Majority		1,208	12.0	−20.0
Turnout		9,984	86.0	+7.5
Liberal hold		Swing		

=== Elections in the 1900s ===
General election 1906: North West Norfolk
Party	Candidate	Votes	%	±%
Liberal	George White	5,772	66.0	+13.1
Conservative	William James Lancaster	2,972	34.0	−13.1
Majority		2,800	32.0	+26.2
Turnout		8,744	78.5	+3.6
Registered electors		11,140		
Liberal hold		Swing	+13.1	

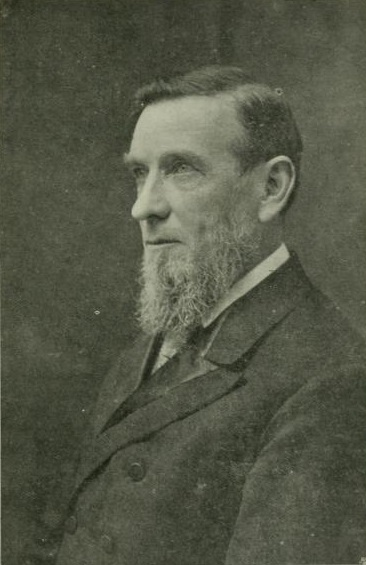
George White

General election 1900: North West Norfolk
Party	Candidate	Votes	%	±%
Liberal	George White	4,287	52.9	−4.9
Liberal Unionist	William Howell Browne Ffolkes	3,811	47.1	+4.9
Majority		476	5.8	−9.8
Turnout		8,098	74.9	−1.5
Registered electors		10,811		
Liberal hold		Swing	−4.9	

=== Elections in the 1890s ===
General election 1895: North West Norfolk
Party	Candidate	Votes	%	±%
Lib-Lab	Joseph Arch	4,817	57.8	+1.6
Conservative	Edward Kenrick Banbury Tighe	3,520	42.2	−1.6
Majority		1,297	15.6	+3.2
Turnout		8,337	76.4	−10.8
Registered electors		10,916		
Lib-Lab hold		Swing	+1.6	

General election 1892: North West Norfolk
Party	Candidate	Votes	%	±%
Lib-Lab	Joseph Arch	4,911	56.2	+6.3
Conservative	Henry Cavendish-Bentinck	3,822	43.8	−6.3
Majority		1,089	12.4	N/A
Turnout		8,733	87.2	+9.2
Registered electors		10,019		
Lib-Lab gain from Conservative		Swing	+6.3	

=== Elections in the 1880s ===
General election 1886: North West Norfolk
Party	Candidate	Votes	%	±%
Conservative	Henry Cavendish-Bentinck	4,084	50.1	+4.0
Lib-Lab	Joseph Arch	4,064	49.9	−4.0
Majority		20	0.2	N/A
Turnout		8,148	78.0	−1.3
Registered electors		10,444		
Conservative gain from Lib-Lab		Swing	+4.0	

General election 1885: North West Norfolk
Party	Candidate	Votes	%	±%
Lib-Lab	Joseph Arch	4,461	53.9	
Conservative	Henry Cavendish-Bentinck	3,821	46.1	
Majority		640	7.8	
Turnout		8,282	79.3	
Registered electors		10,444		
Lib-Lab win (new seat)				

== See also ==
- List of parliamentary constituencies in Norfolk
- List of parliamentary constituencies in the East of England (region)
