= Lady Lucy Whitmore =

English noblewoman

- Born: Lucy Elizabeth Georgiana Bridgeman; 22 January 1792; England
- Died: 17 March 1840 (aged 48)
- Resting place: Quatt, Shropshire, England
- Occupations: Noblewoman, hymn writer
- Spouse: William Wolryche-Whitmore (m. 1810)
- Parent(s): Orlando Bridgeman, 1st Earl of Bradford; Lucy Elizabeth Byng
- Relatives: George Bridgeman, 2nd Earl of Bradford (brother); Charles Orlando Bridgeman (brother); George Byng, 4th Viscount Torrington (maternal grandfather)
- Writing career
- Language: English
- Genre: Hymns
- Subject: Christianity
- Notable works: "Father, again in Jesus' name we meet"

Lady Lucy Whitmore (née, Bridgeman; 22 January 1792 – 17 March 1840) was an English noblewoman and a hymn writer from Shropshire. She was the author of Family prayers for every day in the week (1824), which included fourteen original hymns and went into a second edition in 1827; one of these, "Father, again in Jesus' name we meet", was widely reprinted in hymn collections. Whitmore also published works of religious instruction, including Sunday reading for very little boys and girls (1832) and Morning and evening prayers (1869). She spent much of her life at Dudmaston Hall and was connected through family and friendship to prominent figures of her time.

== Biography ==
Lucy Elizabeth Georgiana Bridgeman was born on 22 January 1792. She was the only daughter of Orlando Bridgeman, 1st Earl of Bradford. Her mother was Lucy Elizabeth Byng (1760–1844), the eldest daughter of George Byng, 4th Viscount Torrington. She had four siblings, all brothers, namely: George Bridgeman, 2nd Earl of Bradford; Vice-Admiral the Hon. Charles Orlando Bridgeman; Hon. Orlando Henry Bridgeman; and Reverend Hon. Henry Edmund Bridgeman.

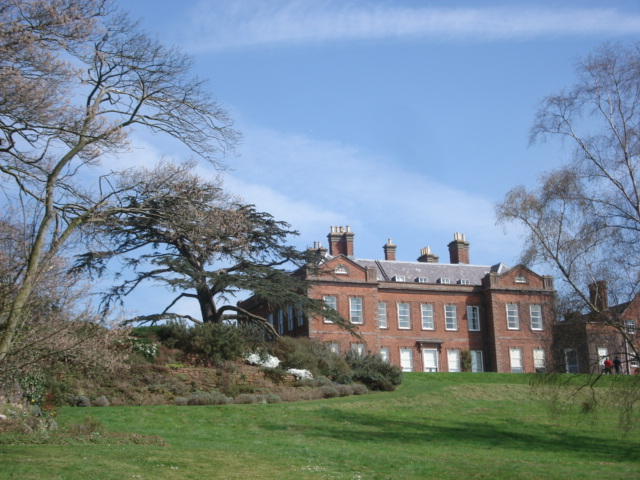
Dudmaston Hall

On 29 January 1810, she married William Wolryche-Whitmore, of Dudmaston Hall, Shropshire. She published, Family prayers for every day in the week : selected from various portions of the Holy Bible with references. To which are added, a few prayers for persons in private; and fourteen original hymns in 1824, containing the lyrics to fourteen original hymns with a second edition in 1827. Number eight of these hymns was "Father, again in Jesus' name we meet", and it passed into many collections. Suitable for Lent, this hymn appeared to be the only one known or used towards the end of the 19th-century.

Whitmore was a friend of Lady Louisa Cadogan.

Lady Lucy Whitmore died on 17 March 1840 and was buried at Quatt.

== "Father, again in Jesus' name we meet" ==
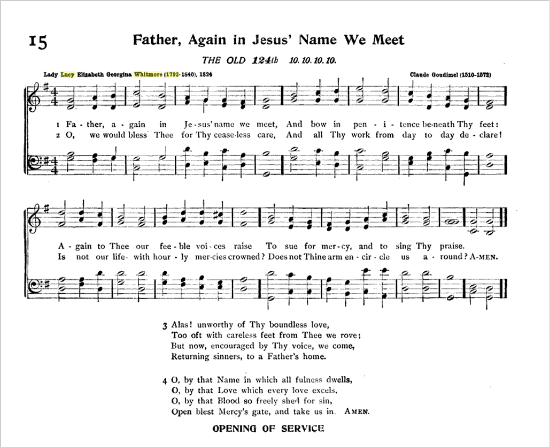
"Father, again in Jesus' name we meet" (1824)

"Father, again in Jesus' name we meet,
And bow in penitence beneath thy feet;
Again to thee our feeble voices raise,
To sue for mercy, and to sing thy praise.

“O we would bless thee for thy ceaseless care,
And all thy work from day to day declare;
Is not our life with hourly mercies crowned?
Does not thine arm encircle us around?

"Alas! unworthy of thy boundless love,
Too oft with careless feet from thee we rove;
But now, encouraged by thy voice we come,
Returning sinners, to a Father's home.

"Oh by His name in whom all fulness dwells,
Oh by his love which every love excels,
Oh by his blood so freely shed for sin,
Open blessed mercy's gate, and take us in."

== Selected works ==
- Family prayers for every day in the week : selected from various portions of the Holy Bible with references. To which are added, a few prayers for persons in private; and fourteen original hymns, 1824
- Sunday reading for very little boys and girls, 1832
- Morning and evening prayers, 1869
