= George Turner (British politician) =

British politician (born 1940)

Member of Parliament for North West Norfolk
- In office 1 May 1997 – 14 May 2001
- Preceded by: Henry Bellingham
- Succeeded by: Henry Bellingham

Opposition Leader on Norfolk County Council Labour Group Leader on Norfolk County Council
- In office 13 April 1984 – May 1990
- Preceded by: Michael Ferris
- Succeeded by: Celia Cameron

Norfolk County Councillor for University
- In office 5 May 1977 – 2 May 1997
- Preceded by: J. Walker
- Succeeded by: Roy Blower

Personal details
- Born: 9 August 1940 (age 86)
- Party: Labour
- Spouse: Lesley Duggan
- Education: Imperial College London; Gonville and Caius College, Cambridge

George Turner (born 9 August 1940) is a British Labour Party politician.

== Early life ==
Turner attended Laxton Grammar School (now part of Oundle School) on North Street in Oundle. At Imperial College London he gained a BSc in Physics, then obtained a PhD in Physics from Gonville and Caius College, Cambridge. He then became Head of the Electrical Engineering Department at the University of East Anglia.

== Parliamentary career ==
Turner contested North West Norfolk on behalf of Labour in 1992, but failed to be elected. He was returned as the member of parliament (MP) for the constituency in 1997, but lost his seat back to Henry Bellingham of the Conservative Party – whom he had first defeated – in 2001.

In defeating Bellingham in 1997, Turner benefitted from a somewhat curious echo of a famous historical episode, as noted by the Conservative peer and historian Lord Lexden during a debate in the House of Lords in 2012. Referring to Spencer Perceval, the only Prime Minister to have been assassinated, Lexden remarked in that debate: "My Lords, would my noble friend think of reminding Mr Henry Bellingham that he has already experienced the Perceval family's taste for revenge, having been deprived of his Commons seat at the 1997 election by a direct descendant of the assassinated Prime Minister?" Perceval's descendant was a third candidate in the constituency, Roger Percival of the Referendum Party, who in Lexden's view had deprived Bellingham (in turn a kinsman of Spencer Perceval's assassin, John Bellingham, and thus a suitable target for "revenge") of a critical number of votes in the election, thereby delivering victory to George Turner.

== Personal life ==
He married Lesley Duggan. He has two daughters a stepson and stepdaughter.

Parliament of the United Kingdom
Preceded by Henry Bellingham	Member of Parliament for North West Norfolk; 1997–2001	Succeeded by Henry Bellingham
