= John Walpole (died 1557) =

Member of the Parliament of England

John Walpole (born by 1522 – died 1 or 2 November 1557) was an English lawyer.

== Biography ==
He was justice of the peace for Norfolk in 1547, member of Parliament for Lynn in March and October 1553, serjeant-at-law in 1555 and recorder of Lynn and Norwich from 1556 until his death.
