= Christopher Brocklebank-Fowler =

British politician (1934–2020)

Member of Parliament for North West Norfolk (King’s Lynn, 1970–1974)
- In office 18 June 1970 – 13 May 1983
- Preceded by: Derek Page
- Succeeded by: Henry Bellingham

Personal details
- Born: 13 January 1934 Banbury, England
- Died: 29 May 2020 (aged 86)
- Party: Conservative (before 1981); SDP (1981–88); Liberal Democrats (1988–96); Labour (1996–2020)
- Spouses: Joan Nowland (m. 1957; div. 1975); Mary Berry (m. 1975; div. 1986); Dorothea Rycroft (m. 1996; div. 2000)
- Children: 2
- Education: The Perse School

Christopher Brocklebank-Fowler (13 January 1934 – 29 May 2020) was a British politician who was a Member of Parliament from 1970 to 1983. In 1981, he defected to the Social Democratic Party (SDP), the only Conservative MP to do so. He then joined the Liberal Democrats, followed by Labour, thereby being a member of four political parties within 15 years.

== Early life and education ==
Brocklebank-Fowler was born in Banbury on 13 January 1934, as the second son of the solicitor Sidney Brocklebank-Fowler and his wife Iris Beechey. He attended primary school on the west coast of Scotland during the Second World War, where his father served in the Royal Air Force, and the family lived at Culzean Castle. After the war, the family moved to Cambridge, where Brocklebank-Folwer was educated at The Perse School. He later studied for a diploma in agriculture at the University of Oxford.

He served his National Service in the Royal Navy on submarines and later worked on a coffee farm in Kenya. He was also employed by Unilever and as an advertising consultant before his election to Parliament.

== Parliamentary career ==
After unsuccessfully contesting West Ham North in 1964, Brocklebank-Fowler entered Parliament as a Conservative at the 1970 general election, representing the constituency of King's Lynn. This seat was abolished at the February 1974 general election, and Brocklebank-Fowler was elected for the new North West Norfolk seat.

He was re-elected in the 1979 general election with a majority of 7,928.

In 1981 Brocklebank-Fowler defected to the Social Democratic Party (SDP), crossing the floor during a parliamentary debate on the budget. In the House of Commons he represented the SDP on agriculture and overseas development issues. However, at the 1983 general election the Conservatives regained North West Norfolk with a majority of over 3,000. Brocklebank-Fowler contested the seat again at the 1987 general election, but lost by a much wider margin.

== Later career ==
After the SDP's merger with the Liberal Party to form the Liberal Democrats, Brocklebank-Fowler contested the South Norfolk constituency at the 1992 general election, but once again finished second. In 1996 he joined the Labour Party, saying that he was prompted by Tony Blair's "determination to pursue constitutional reform, efficient economic management, and fairer social provision which alone can restore One Nation".

== Personal life ==
Brocklebank-Fowler was married three times. With his first wife, Joan Nowland, whom he married in 1957, he had two sons. In 1975, they divorced and he married his second wife, Mary Berry; they divorced in 1986. He was then married Dorothea Rycroft from 1996 until their divorce in 2000.

He later moved to Thurso, Scotland, where he restored a fishery on the Forss Water. He died from pneumonia on 29 May 2020.

== Bibliography ==
- Who's Who 2003 (A&C Black Ltd.)

Parliament of the United Kingdom
Preceded by Derek Page	Member of Parliament for King's Lynn; 1970 – Feb 1974	Constituency abolished
New constituency	Member of Parliament for North West Norfolk; Feb 1974 – 1983	Succeeded by Henry Bellingham
