= Crisp Molineux =

English politician

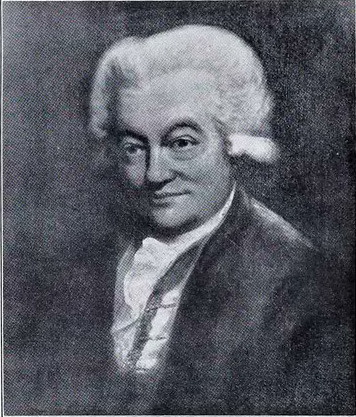
- John Opie
- Born: 1730; Saint Kitts
- Died: 4 December 1792 (aged 61–62); Saint Kitts
- Occupation: Politician
- Spouse(s): Catherine Montgomerie
- Position held: High Sheriff of Norfolk (1767–1768)

Crisp Molineux MP (1730–1792) was a British politician and slave holder.

== Biography ==
Molineux was born on the island of Saint Kitts in 1730, the eldest surviving son of Charles L. Molineux and Margaret Molineux (formerly Crisp).

In 1754, Molineux returned to England and purchased Garboldisham Hall in Norfolk. Molineux was able to purchase this property due to his inheritance of several sugar plantations and enslaved people on Saint Kitts.

In 1756, Molineux married Catherine Montgomerie, the daughter of George Montgomerie, at St George's Church, Hanover Square in Mayfair.

In 1766, Molineux unsuccessfully campaigned to be Member of Parliament for King's Lynn and was also linked with campaigns for Newcastle-under-Lyme and Dover, eventually becoming Member for Castle Rising in 1771.

On 21 May 1789, Molineux delivered a speech strongly condemning the Abolitionist movement whilst showing his support for the Prime Minister, William Pitt the Younger.

By 1790, Molineux had fallen gravely ill and returned to Saint Kitts to try and restore his health, finally dying in 1792.

After his death, Molineux left his fortune, including Garboldisham Hall and his estates in Saint Kitts, to his grandson, Crisp Molineux Montgomerie.

Parliament of Great Britain
Preceded by Thomas Whately; Jenison Shafto	Member of Parliament for Castle Rising; 1771–1774; With: Thomas Whately (1771-1772); Lord Guernsey (1772-1774)	Succeeded by Alexander Wedderburn; Robert Mackreth
Preceded by The Hon. Thomas Walpole; Sir John Turner	Member of Parliament for King's Lynn; 1774–1790; With: The Hon. Thomas Walpole (1774-1784); The Hon. Horatio Walpole (1784-1790)	Succeeded by The Hon. Horatio Walpole; Sir Martin ffolkes
