= Henry Betley =

English politician (born 1339)

Henry Betley (25 November 1339 – before March 1405) was an English politician and coroner. He sat as MP for Bishop's Lynn in January 1377, November 1380, April 1384, and February 1388 and Mayor of Lynn from Michaelmas 1382 till 1383.

== Political career ==
He also served as councillor for Lynn from Michaelmas 1369 till 1371, 1372 till 1375, 1376 till 1377, 1378 till 1382, and 1383 till 1392; and chamberlain of Lynn from 1371 till 1372, and 1377 till 1378; coroner of Lynn from December 1381 till November 1382; tax assessor of Lynn in May 1379; commissioner of array in Lynn in May 1385, and May 1386; and alderman of Holy Trinity guild in Lynn by April 1390 till after September 1392.

== Family ==
He was the second son and eventual heir of Hugh Betley of Lynn (died 1349) by Margery, the daughter of John Swerdestone of Lynn. He married Margery (died 1411) and they had one son.
