= Ronald Scott-Miller =

British Conservative politician (1904–92)

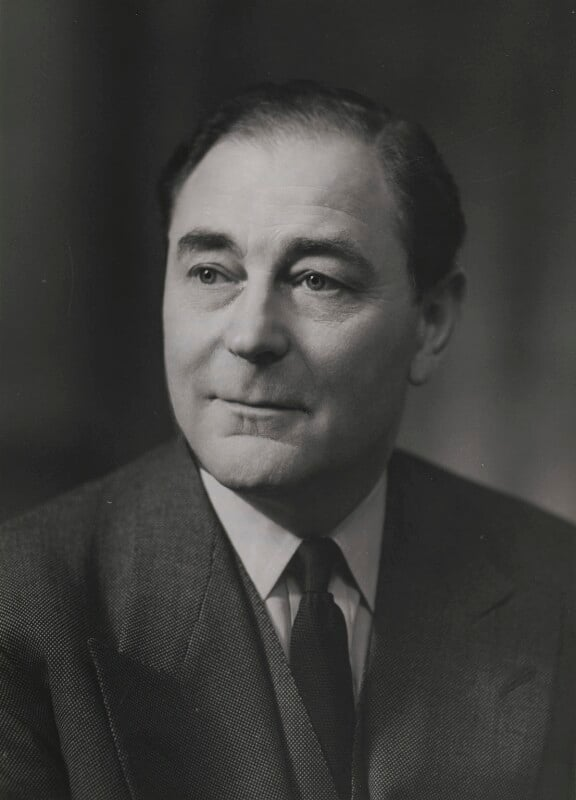
Scott-Miller in 1954

Ronald Scott-Miller (1 November 1904 – 10 March 1992) was a Conservative Party politician in the United Kingdom. He was member of parliament (MP) for the King's Lynn constituency in Norfolk from 1951 until he retired from the House of Commons at the 1959 general election.

He was educated at Aldro, Eastbourne and Uppingham School.

Parliament of the United Kingdom
Preceded by Frederick Wise	Member of Parliament for King's Lynn; 1951–1959	Succeeded by Denys Bullard
