= Robert Brunham (politician) =

Member of the Parliament of England

Robert Brunham was a member of parliament for Bishop's Lynn (now King's Lynn) in Norfolk, England, in 1402 and 1417.

== See also ==
- Margery Kempe
- John Brunham
