= Edmund Beleyeter =

English politician

Edmund Beleyeter (c. 1338–1417/18) was an English politician. He sat as MP for Bishop's Lynn in 1386 and September 1388 and Mayor of Lynn from Michaelmas 1390 till 1391, 1394 till 1395 and 1399 till 1400.

He also served as chamberlain of Lynn from Michaelmas 1370 till 1372, 1384 till 1385 and 1389 till 1390; councillor from 1371 till 1376, 1377 till 1378, 1380 till 1382, 1385 till 1386, 1387 till 1389 and 1391 till 1392; coroner from 8 January till 21 October 1390; deputy butler from 6 November 1382 till December 1396; justice of the peace from 16 February 1395 till 1400; mayor of the Staple from October 1396 till 1397; commissioner of array in December 1399, August 1403 and October 1403; commissioner to victual the royal army in June 1405; controller of a tax in May 1404; and alderman of Holy Trinity guild in Lynn by March 1405 till 1407 and 1408 till c. September 1413.

He was the son of Thomas Beleyeter of Lynn and he married and had one son.
