= John Bilney (MP for Cambridge) =

English politician

John Bilney of Cambridge (fl. 1382–1436) was an English politician. He sat as MP for Cambridge in 1406, March 1416, 1417, and March 1421.

He was a scholar at King's Hall, Cambridge. He was admitted on 9 October 1382, served as a fellow from c. 1383 till c. 1400, magistrate by 1388 till 1389. Before 1429, he married Margaret, who was probably the widow of John Smith of Stilton, Huntingdonshire.

He also served as seneschal of King's Hall from 1388 till 1389, and 1398; Mayor of Cambridge from September 1406 till 1407, 1414 till 1418, and 1433 till 1434; justice of the peace for Cambridge from 14 February 1407 – January 1409, 8 February till May 1414, 6 October 1415 till October 1418, 13 November 1427 till January 1430, and 4 December 1433 till 1435; commissioner for the repair of the great bridge at Cambridge in July 1413, July 1422, and June 1423.
