= John Brunham =

English mayor and merchant

John Brunham was a merchant in Bishop's Lynn (now King's Lynn), Norfolk, England, five times mayor of the town and member of Parliament. He was the father of Margery Kempe, and a kinsman (possibly father) of Robert Brunham.
