= George Thomas Orlando Bridgeman =

British Anglican priest and antiquarian (1823–95)

The Honourable George T. O. Bridgeman MA JP
- Born: 21 August 1823
- Died: 25 November 1895 (aged 72)
- Education: Harrow School; Trinity College, Cambridge
- Occupations: Clergyman; Antiquary

George Thomas Orlando Bridgeman JP (21 August 1823 – 25 November 1895) was a Church of England clergyman and antiquary, the second son of George Bridgeman, 2nd Earl of Bradford.

He was educated at Harrow School and Trinity College, Cambridge, where he was a member of the University Pitt Club, and graduated as MA in 1845.

After being ordained priest in 1850, he became successively parish Rector of Willey, Shropshire 1850–53; Blymhill, Staffordshire in 1853-64 (besides Rural Dean of Brewood in 1863); and of Wigan, Lancashire from 1864 until his death. While at Wigan, he also became Honorary Canon of Chester Cathedral in 1872, then of Liverpool Cathedral following the creation of the latter diocese in 1880, which incorporated his parish. He was also chaplain to Queen Victoria from 1872.

He was JP for the counties of Shropshire and Staffordshire and an early trustee of the William Salt Library, Stafford.

He began to study his family history, and contributed several articles to Archaeologia Cambrensis. The outcome of his research into genealogy was History of the Princes of South Wales (1876).

He died at The Hall, Wigan, in 1895, aged seventy-two.

Professional and academic associations
Preceded by Sir Henry Fox Bristowe	Vice-President of the Record Society of Lancashire and Cheshire; 1883–95	Succeeded by Henry Hoyle Howorth
