= George Bridgeman, 2nd Earl of Bradford =

British peer (1789–1865)

The Earl of Bradford
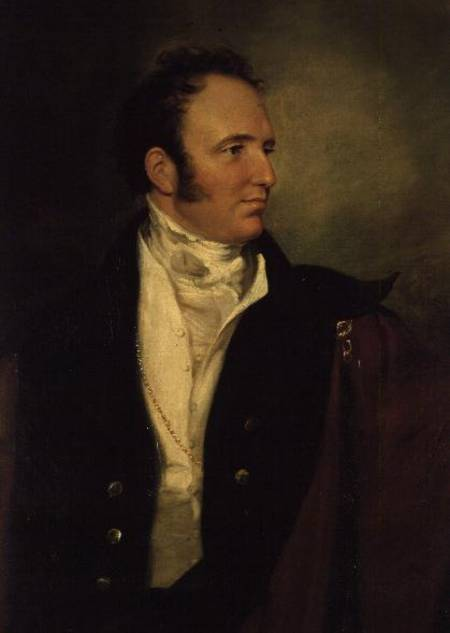
- Portrait by Sir George Hayter

Earl of Bradford
- Tenure: 1825–1865
- Predecessor: Orlando Bridgeman
- Successor: Orlando Bridgeman
- Born: George Augustus Frederick Henry Bridgeman; 23 October 1789; Knightsbridge, London
- Died: 22 March 1865 (aged 75); Weston-under-Lizard, Staffordshire, England
- Spouses: Georgina Elizabeth Moncreiffe (m. 1818; died 1842); Helen MacKay Moncreiffe (m. 1849)
- Issue Among others: Orlando Bridgeman; George Bridgeman
- Father: Orlando Bridgeman
- Mother: Hon. Lucy Elizabeth Byng

George Augustus Frederick Henry Bridgeman, 2nd Earl of Bradford (23 October 1789 – 22 March 1865), styled Hon. George Bridgeman from 1800–15 and Viscount Newport from 1815–25, was a British peer.

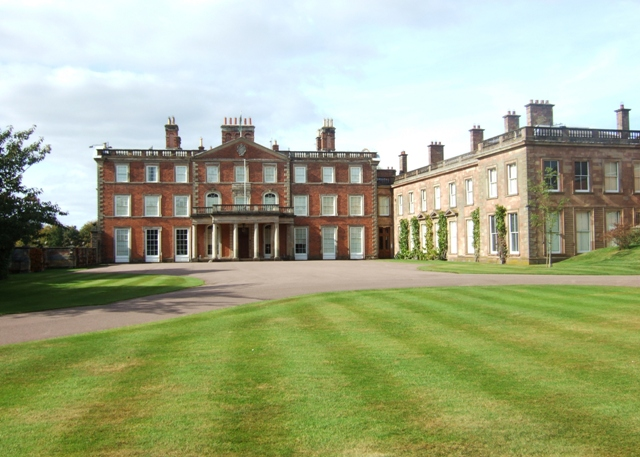
Weston Park

== Early life ==
Bridgeman was born in 1789, the eldest son of Orlando Bridgeman, and Hon. Lucy Elizabeth Byng, daughter and co-heiress of George Byng, 4th Viscount Torrington. In 1794, his paternal grandfather, Sir Henry Bridgeman, 5th Baronet, was raised to the peerage as Baron Bradford, and George's father inherited the title six years later. In 1815, his father was further created Earl of Bradford and Viscount Newport; George adopted the subsidiary title until inheriting the earldom himself a decade later.

His siblings included Charles Orlando Bridgeman, Lady Lucy Whitmore, Hon. Orlando Henry Bridgeman, and the Rev. Hon. Henry Edmund Bridgeman.

He was educated at Harrow School, London, and Trinity College, Cambridge, where he graduated with a Master of Arts in 1810.

== Career ==
He succeeded to his father's titles and the family seat at Weston Park, Staffordshire, on 7 September 1825.

== Personal life ==
Lord Bradford married, firstly, Georgina Elizabeth Moncreiffe, daughter of Thomas Moncreiffe, in St George's, Hanover Square, on 5 March 1818. They had eight children:

- Orlando George Charles Bridgeman, Viscount Newport (1819–1898), who married Hon. Selina Weld-Forester, daughter of Cecil Weld-Forester, 1st Baron Forester, in 1844, and succeeded as 3rd Earl of Bradford
- Hon. Elizabeth Lucy Bridgeman (10 June 1820 – 3 January 1822), died young
- Hon. Rev. George Thomas Orlando Bridgeman (1823–1895), Chaplain in Ordinary to Queen Victoria
- Lady Georgiana Elizabeth Bridgeman (22 March 1825 – 4 July 1843), died aged 17
- Lady Mary Selina Louisa Bridgeman (24 November 1829 – 12 July 1889), who married Hon. Robert Windsor-Clive in 1852
- Lady Lucy Caroline Bridgeman (13 October 1826 – 3 December 1858), died unmarried of severe burns
- Lady Charlotte Anne Bridgeman (11 November 1827 – 26 November 1858), died unmarried of severe burns
- Hon. Rev. John Robert Orlando Bridgeman (18 August 1831 – 26 November 1897), who married Marianne Caroline Clive, daughter of the Ven. William Clive, in 1862; their son was William Clive Bridgeman, 1st Viscount Bridgeman.

After the death of his wife, Georgina, he married, secondly, Helen Moncrieffe (widow of his first wife's brother, Sir David Moncrieffe, 6th Baronet), daughter of Cpt. Æneas Mackay of Scotstoun, in St Peter's Church, Eaton Square, London, on 30 October 1849.

On 15 November 1858 at the family home, Weston Park, Lady Lucy Caroline and Lady Charlotte Anne both suffered severe burns as a result of their cotton dresses being set alight by the sparks from a fireplace or a candle. Lady Lucy's dress initially caught fire and Lady Charlotte was attempting to put out her dress when she likewise became engulfed in flames. Lady Charlotte and Lady Lucy succumbed to the severe burns, a week apart. The Earl, his son and son-in-law, Viscount Newport and Lady Newport, also suffered severe burns to their hands from attempting to rescue the two ladies.

After a lingering illness, Lord Bradford died aged 75 at Weston Park, Staffordshire, leaving an estate worth £140,000 (equivalent to £15,208,000 in 2025) and was succeeded in his titles by his eldest son, Orlando.

== Arms ==
Coat of arms of George Bridgeman, 2nd Earl of Bradford
Coronet That of a earl. Crest A demi-lion rampant argent holding between the paws a wreath of laurel proper. Escutcheon Sable, ten plates, four, three, two, and one, on a chief argent a lion passant ermines. Supporters Two leopards, guardant gules pelletée. Motto Nec temere, nec I timide (Neither rashley nor timidly).

Peerage of the United Kingdom
Preceded by Orlando Bridgeman	Earl of Bradford; 2nd creation 1825–1865	Succeeded by Orlando Bridgeman
