= Horatio Walpole, 1st Earl of Orford =

British Whig politician

The Right Honourable The Earl of Orford
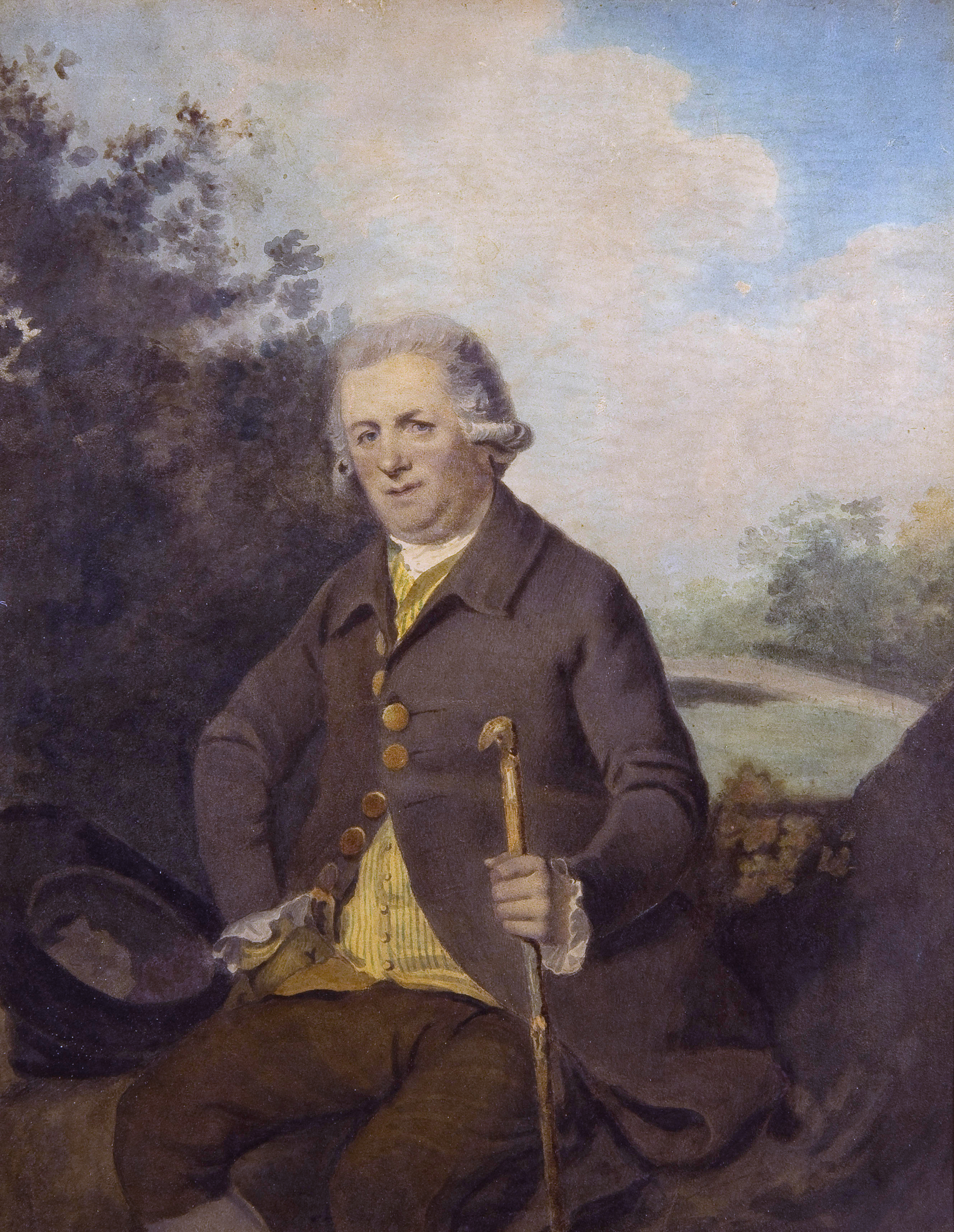
- Portrait of Horatio Walpole, Earl of Orford, by Henry Walton

Member of Parliament for King's Lynn
- In office 1747–1757 Serving with Sir John Turner, Bt.

Personal details
- Born: 12 June 1723
- Died: 24 February 1809 (aged 85)
- Party: Whig
- Spouse: Rachel Cavendish (m. 1748)
- Children: 3+, including Horatio and George
- Parent: Horatio Walpole (father)
- Relatives: Horace Walpole (cousin)
- Education: Corpus Christi College, Cambridge

Horatio Walpole, 1st Earl of Orford (12 June 1723 – 24 February 1809) was a British Whig politician.

== Biography ==
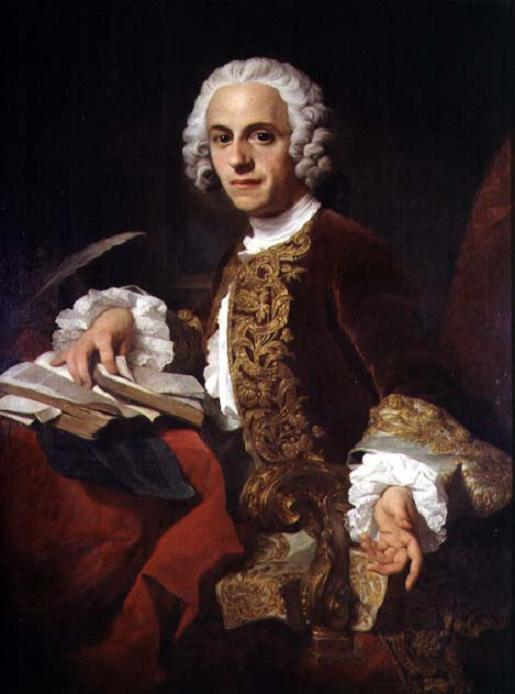
Horatio Walpole (1723–1809) by Pierre Subleyras, circa 1746

Walpole was the eldest son and heir of Horatio Walpole, 1st Baron Walpole and his wife, Mary Magdalen Lombard.

He was admitted to Lincoln's Inn in January 1736, and matriculated at Corpus Christi College, Cambridge, in 1741.

In 1747, he was elected as Member of Parliament for King's Lynn and held the seat until 1757 when he inherited his father's barony of Walpole (of Wolterton). In 1797, he inherited the barony of Walpole (of Walpole) from his first cousin, the 4th and last Earl of Orford (of the second creation) and was himself created Earl of Orford in 1806.

Letters from St James's Palace from George III to Walpole, dated 30 March 1806, show that the King gave his approval to the creation of Walpole's new title. On the same date, the King gave his written approval to Charles Pierrepont, 1st Viscount Newark – like Walpole, a parliamentarian – who had asked the King for his permission to be created Earl Manvers.

On 12 May 1748, Walpole married Lady Rachel Cavendish (1727 – 8 May 1805), the third daughter of the 3rd Duke of Devonshire, and on his death in 1809, his titles passed to their eldest son, Horatio. Lord Orford and his wife had at least two other children: Lady Mary Walpole (born c. 1757), who married Thomas Hussey, 19th Baron Galtrim, on 4 August 1777 and had issue; and The Hon. George Walpole (20 June 1758 – May 1835).

In 1758 he was the godfather of Admiral Horatio Nelson, who was named after him.

== Arms ==
Coat of arms of Horatio Walpole, 1st Earl of Orford
| Crest The bust of a man in profile couped proper, ducally crowned or, from the coronet flowing a long cap turned forwards gules tasselled and charged with a catherine wheel gold. Escutcheon Or, on a fess between. two chevrons sable, three crosses crosslet of the first. Supporters Dexter, an antelope; sinister, a stag argent, attired proper, each gorged with a collar chequy or and azure chained gold. Motto Fari quæ sentiat (To speak what he feels). |

Parliament of Great Britain
| Preceded by Sir John Turner, Bt. Edward Bacon | Member of Parliament for King's Lynn; 1747–1757; With: Sir John Turner, Bt. | Succeeded by Sir John Turner, Bt. Horace Walpole |
Peerage of the United Kingdom
| New creation | Earl of Orford; 3rd creation 1806–1809 | Succeeded by Horatio Walpole |
Peerage of Great Britain
| Preceded by Horace Walpole | Baron Walpole of Walpole; 1797–1809 | Succeeded by Horatio Walpole |
| Preceded by Horatio Walpole | Baron Walpole of Wolterton; 1757–1809 | Succeeded by Horatio Walpole |
