= King's Lynn (constituency) =

Parliamentary constituency in the United Kingdom, 1801–1974

- Former county constituency for the House of Commons

1918–February 1974
- Seats: one
- Replaced by: North West Norfolk

1298–1918
- Seats: two (1298–1885), one (1885–1918)
- Type of constituency: Borough constituency

King's Lynn was a constituency in Norfolk which was represented continuously in the House of Commons of England from 1298 to 1707, in the House of Commons of Great Britain from 1707 to 1800, and in the House of Commons of the United Kingdom from 1801 until it was abolished for the February 1974 general election.

== History ==
The Parliamentary Borough of King's Lynn, which was known as Lynn or Bishop's Lynn prior to 1537, returned two Members of Parliament until 1885, when its representation was reduced to one member by the Redistribution of Seats Act 1885. It was abolished as a Borough under the Representation of the People Act 1918 and was reconstituted as a Division of the Parliamentary County of Norfolk (from 1950, a County Constituency), absorbing the bulk of the abolished North Western Division. It was abolished for the February 1974 general election, being replaced by the re-established constituency of North West Norfolk.

Sir Robert Walpole, the first Prime Minister, was an MP for the constituency for almost the entirety of his parliamentary career, from 1702 to 1742.

== Boundaries and boundary changes ==
1885–1918

- The existing parliamentary borough, and so much of the municipal borough of King's Lynn as was not already included in the parliamentary borough.

1918–1950

- The Borough of King's Lynn;
- The Urban Districts of New Hunstanton and Walsoken;
- The Rural Districts of Docking, Freebridge Lynn, King's Lynn, and Marshland (except the parishes of Outwell and Upwell); and
- The Rural District of Downham parishes of Wiggenhall St Germans, Wiggenhall St Mary the Virgin, Wiggenhall St Mary Magdalen, and Wiggenhall St Peter.

1950–1974

- The Municipal Borough of King's Lynn;
- The Urban District of New Hunstanton; and
- The Rural Districts of Docking, Freebridge Lynn, and Marshland.

Minor changes to the boundary with South West Norfolk to align with boundaries of local authorities, which had been rationalised. Also marginal changes to county boundaries with Isle of Ely and Parts of Holland.

== Members of Parliament ==
=== MPs before 1640 ===
Parliament	First member	Second member
1328	John de Swerdeston	Roger de Buttele
1335	William de Brinton	
1337	John de Swerdeston	William de Secheford
1338	Roger de Buttele	Geoffrey Drewe
1339	Thomas de Melcheburne	
1375	Robert Bathe	John Waryn
1377	John Dockyngg	Thomas ...
1378	Nicholas de Swerdeston	Hugh de Ellyngham
1379	John Brunham	Thomas de Morton
1380	Richard de Honton	Henry de Betele
1381	Thomas Drewe	Thomas de Morton
1382	John Brunham	John Waryn
1385	John de Brandon	Thomas de Morton
1386	Edmund Beleyeter	Thomas Morton
1388 (Feb)	Henry Betley	Thomas Morton
1388 (Sep)	Edmund Beleyeter	Thomas Drew
1390 (Jan)	Robert Waterden	John Wace
1390 (Nov)	John Wentworth	Thomas Waterden
1391	Robert Botkesham	John Kepe
1393	Thomas Morton	Thomas Brigge
1394	Thomas Morton	Thomas Drew
1395	Thomas Waterden	John Brandon
1397 (Jan)	Thomas Drew	John Brandon
1397 (Sep)	John Wentworth	Roger Rawlin
1399	Robert Botkesham	Thomas Waterden
1401	Robert Botkesham	Thomas Waterden
1402	Thomas Fawkes	Robert Brunham
1404 (Jan)	Thomas Drew	John Wentworth
1404 (Oct)	John Brandon	Thomas Drew
1406	Thomas Brigge	Thomas Derham
1407	William Lok	John Wesenham
1410	John Spicer	John Brown
1411	Bartholomew Sistern	Philip Frank
1413 (Feb)	William Halyate	John Tilney
1413 (May)	William Halyate	John Tilney
1414 (Apr)	John Bilney	John Tilney
1414 (Nov)	John Spicer	Andrew Swanton
1415	Thomas Brigge	John Tilney
1416 (Mar)	John Spicer	Thomas Brigge
1416 (Oct)	William Herford	John Warner
1417	Robert Brunham	Thomas Hunt
1419	Philip Frank	Walter Curson
1420	Thomas Brigge	Andrew Swanton
1421 (May)	Bartholomew Sistern	John Parmenter
1421 (Dec)	John Waterden	Robert Brandon
1510	Thomas Gibbon	Francis Monford
1512	Francis Monford	Thomas Wythe
1515	Robert Soome	Thomas Wythe
1523	Thomas Miller	Richard Bewcher
1529	Thomas Miller	Richard Bewcher replaced Oct 1535 by Robert Southwell
1536	Robert Southwell	William Coningsby
1539	Thomas Waters	Robert Southwell
1542	Thomas Waters	Thomas Miller
1545	Edmund Grey	Thomas Miller
1547	Thomas Gawdy	William Overend replaced Jan 1549 by George Amyas
1553 (Mar)	Sir Richard Corbet	John Walpole
1553 (Oct)	John Walpole	Thomas Waters
1554 (Apr)	Thomas Waters	William Overend
1554 (Nov)	Sir Thomas Moyle	Thomas Waters
1555	Sir Nicholas L'Estrange	Thomas Waters
1558	Ambrose Gilberd, died and replaced Sep 1558 by William Telverton	Thomas Waters
1558/9	Thomas Hogan	Thomas Waters
1562/3	(Sir) Robert Bell	Richard L'Estrange
1571	(Sir) Robert Bell	John Kynne
1572	(Sir) Robert Bell, died and replaced Jan 1580 by John Peyton	John Pell
1584 (Mar)	John Peyton	Richard Clarke
1586 (Oct)	Richard Clarke	Thomas Oxborough
1588/9	Richard Clarke	Thomas Boston
1593	Sir John Peyton	William Lewis
1597 (Sep)	Thomas Oxborough	Nathaniel Bacon
1601	Sir Robert Mansell	Thomas Oxborough
1604	Thomas Oxborough	Robert Hitcham
1614	Matthew Clerke	Thomas Oxborough
1621–1622	Matthew Clerke	John Wallis
1624	John Wallis	William Doughty
1625	Thomas Gurling	John Cooke
1626	Thomas Gurling	John Cooke
1628	William Doughty	Sir John Hare
1629–1640	No Parliaments summoned	

=== MPs 1640–1885 ===
Year	First member	First party	Second member	Second party
1640 (Apr)	William Doughty		Thomas Gurling	
1640 (Nov)	John Perceval	Parliamentarian	Thomas Toll	Parliamentarian
1644	Perceval died – seat vacant		Thomas Toll	Parliamentarian
1646	Edmund Hudson		Thomas Toll	Parliamentarian
July 1647	Hudson expelled – seat vacant		Thomas Toll	Parliamentarian
1649	William Cecil (The Earl of Salisbury)		Thomas Toll	Parliamentarian
1653	King's Lynn was unrepresented in the Barebones Parliament			
1654	Major-General Philip Skippon		Guybon Goddard	
1656	Major-General Philip Skippon		Major-General John Desborough	
January 1659	Griffith Lloyd		Thomas Toll	
May 1659	William Cecil (The Earl of Salisbury)		One seat vacant	
April 1660	Sir Ralph Hare		Edward Walpole	
1661	Sir William Hovell		Edward Walpole	
1668	Sir William Hovell		Robert Wright	
1670	John Coke		Robert Wright	
1673	Sir Francis North		Robert Wright	
1675	Robert Coke		Robert Wright	
1679	John Turner		Sir Simon Taylor	
1681	Sir Henry Hobart	Whig	Sir Simon Taylor	
1685	Sir John Turner		Sir Simon Taylor	
1689	Sir John Turner		Sigismund Trafford	
1690	Sir John Turner		Daniel Bedingfeld	
1695	Sir John Turner		Sir Charles Turner	
1702	Sir Robert Walpole	Whig	Sir Charles Turner	
1712	John Turner		Sir Charles Turner	
1713	Sir Robert Walpole	Whig	Sir Charles Turner	
1738	Sir Robert Walpole	Whig	Sir John Turner	
1742	Edward Bacon		Sir John Turner	
1747	Horatio Walpole, junior	Whig	Sir John Turner	
1757	Hon. Horace Walpole	Whig	Sir John Turner	
1768	Hon. Thomas Walpole		Sir John Turner	
1774	Hon. Thomas Walpole		Crisp Molineux	
1784	Hon. Horatio Walpole		Crisp Molineux	
1790	Hon. Horatio Walpole		Sir Martin ffolkes	Whig
1809	Horatio Walpole	Tory	Sir Martin ffolkes	Whig
January 1822	Horatio Walpole	Tory	William Cavendish-Scott-Bentinck	Tory
June 1822	John Walpole	Tory	William Cavendish-Scott-Bentinck	Tory
1824	John Walpole	Tory	William Cavendish-Scott-Bentinck	Tory
1826	John Walpole	Tory	Lord William Bentinck	Tory
1828	John Walpole	Tory	Lord George Bentinck	Whig
1831	Lord William Lennox	Whig	Lord George Bentinck	Whig
1834	Lord William Lennox	Whig	Lord George Bentinck	Conservative
1835	Sir Stratford Canning	Conservative	Lord George Bentinck	Conservative
1842 by-election	Robert Jocelyn	Conservative	Lord George Bentinck	Conservative
1847	Robert Jocelyn	Peelite	Lord George Bentinck	Conservative
1848 by-election	Robert Jocelyn	Peelite	Hon. Edward Stanley	Conservative
1854 by-election	John Henry Gurney	Whig	Hon. Edward Stanley	Conservative
1859	John Henry Gurney	Liberal	Hon. Edward Stanley	Conservative
1865	Sir Thomas Buxton	Liberal	Hon. Edward Stanley	Conservative
1868	Hon. Robert Bourke	Conservative	Hon. Edward Stanley	Conservative
1869 by-election	Hon. Robert Bourke	Conservative	Lord Claud Hamilton	Conservative
1880	Hon. Robert Bourke	Conservative	Sir William ffolkes	Liberal
1885	Representation reduced to one Member			

=== MPs 1885–1974 ===
Election	Member	Party
1885	Hon. Robert Bourke, later Baron Connemara	Conservative
1886 by-election	Weston Jarvis	Conservative
1892	Thomas Gibson Bowles	Conservative
1906	Carlyon Bellairs	Liberal
1906	Carlyon Bellairs	Liberal Unionist
January 1910	Thomas Gibson Bowles	Liberal
December 1910	Holcombe Ingleby	Conservative
1918	Sir Neville Jodrell	Conservative
1923	Graham Woodwark	Liberal
1924	Maurice Roche, 4th Baron Fermoy	Conservative
1935	Somerset Maxwell	Conservative
1943	Maurice Roche, 4th Baron Fermoy	Conservative
1945	Frederick Wise	Labour
1951	Ronald Scott-Miller	Conservative
1959	Denys Bullard	Conservative
1964	Derek Page	Labour
1970	Christopher Brocklebank-Fowler	Conservative
1974	constituency abolished	

== Elections ==
=== Elections in the 1830s ===
General election 1830: King's Lynn (2 seats)
Party	Candidate	Votes	%	±%
Whig	George Bentinck	78	49.1	
Tory	John Walpole	73	45.9	
Whig	William ffolkes	8	5.0	
Majority		65	40.9	
Turnout		c. 80	c. 20.0	
Registered electors		c. 400		
Tory hold		Swing		
Tory hold		Swing		

General election 1831: King's Lynn (2 seats)
Party	Candidate	Votes	%
Whig	George Bentinck	Unopposed	
Whig	William Lennox	Unopposed	
Registered electors		c. 400	
Whig hold			
Whig gain from Tory			

General election 1832: King's Lynn (2 seats)
Party	Candidate	Votes	%
Whig	George Bentinck	Unopposed	
Whig	William Lennox	Unopposed	
Registered electors		836	
Whig hold			
Whig hold			

General election 1835: King's Lynn (2 seats)
Party	Candidate	Votes	%
Whig	George Bentinck	531	44.8
Conservative	Stratford Canning	416	35.1
Radical	John Scott Lillie	238	20.1
Majority		178	15.0
Turnout		674	77.9
Registered electors		865	
Conservative hold			
Conservative gain from Whig			

General election 1837: King's Lynn (2 seats)
Party	Candidate	Votes	%	±%
Conservative	George Bentinck	468	38.4	−6.4
Conservative	Stratford Canning	382	31.3	−3.8
Whig	George Keppel	369	30.3	N/A
Majority		13	1.0	−14.0
Turnout		756	85.4	+7.5
Registered electors		885		
Conservative hold		Swing	−6.4	
Conservative hold		Swing	−3.8	

=== Elections in the 1840s ===
General election 1841: King's Lynn (2 seats)
Party	Candidate	Votes	%	±%
Conservative	Stratford Canning	Unopposed		
Conservative	George Bentinck	Unopposed		
Registered electors		1,144		
Conservative hold				
Conservative hold				

Canning resigned after being appointed the United Kingdom's ambassador to Turkey, causing a by-election.

By-election, 10 February 1842: King's Lynn (2 seats)
Party	Candidate	Votes	%	±%
Conservative	Robert Jocelyn	Unopposed		
Conservative hold				

General election 1847: King's Lynn (2 seats)
Party	Candidate	Votes	%	±%
Conservative	George Bentinck	Unopposed		
Peelite	Robert Jocelyn	Unopposed		
Registered electors		1,157		
Conservative hold				
Peelite gain from Conservative				

Cavendish-Scott-Bentinck's death caused a by-election.

By-election, 22 December 1848: King's Lynn
Party	Candidate	Votes	%	±%
Conservative	Edward Stanley	Unopposed		
Conservative hold				

=== Elections in the 1850s ===
General election 1852: King's Lynn (2 seats)
Party	Candidate	Votes	%	±%
Peelite	Robert Jocelyn	641	40.3	N/A
Conservative	Edward Stanley	559	35.2	N/A
Radical	Robert Pashley	390	24.5	N/A
Majority		169	10.7	N/A
Turnout		990 (est)	84.2 (est)	N/A
Registered electors		1,176		
Peelite hold		Swing	N/A	
Conservative hold		Swing	N/A	

Jocelyn's death caused a by-election.

By-election, 16 September 1854: King's Lynn
Party	Candidate	Votes	%	±%
Whig	John Henry Gurney	Unopposed		
Whig gain from Peelite				

General election 1857: King's Lynn (2 seats)
Party	Candidate	Votes	%	±%
Conservative	Edward Stanley	Unopposed		
Whig	John Henry Gurney	Unopposed		
Registered electors		1,055		
Conservative hold				
Whig gain from Peelite				

Stanley was appointed Secretary of State for the Colonies, requiring a by-election.

By-election, 4 March 1858: King's Lynn
Party	Candidate	Votes	%	±%
Conservative	Edward Stanley	Unopposed		
Conservative hold				

Stanley was appointed President of the Board of Control for the Affairs of India, requiring a by-election.

By-election, 5 June 1858: King's Lynn
Party	Candidate	Votes	%	±%
Conservative	Edward Stanley	Unopposed		
Conservative hold				

General election 1859: King's Lynn (2 seats)
Party	Candidate	Votes	%	±%
Conservative	Edward Stanley	Unopposed		
Liberal	John Henry Gurney	Unopposed		
Registered electors		1,019		
Conservative hold				
Liberal hold				

=== Elections in the 1860s ===
General election 1865: King's Lynn (2 seats)
Party	Candidate	Votes	%	±%
Conservative	Edward Stanley	445	37.6	N/A
Liberal	Thomas Buxton	401	33.8	N/A
Conservative	Frederick Walpole	339	28.6	N/A
Turnout		793 (est)	93.1 (est)	N/A
Registered electors		852		
Majority		44	3.8	N/A
Conservative hold		Swing	N/A	
Majority		62	5.2	N/A
Liberal hold		Swing	N/A	

Stanley was appointed Secretary of State for Foreign Affairs, requiring a by-election.

By-election, 11 July 1866: King's Lynn (1 seat)
Party	Candidate	Votes	%	±%
Conservative	Edward Stanley	Unopposed		
Conservative hold				

General election 1868: King's Lynn (2 seats)
Party	Candidate	Votes	%	±%
Conservative	Edward Stanley	1,265	37.2	−0.4
Conservative	Robert Bourke	1,125	33.1	+4.5
Liberal	Thomas Buxton	1,012	29.7	−4.1
Majority		113	3.4	−0.4
Turnout		2,207 (est)	87.8 (est)	−5.3
Registered electors		2,514		
Conservative hold		Swing	+0.8	
Conservative gain from Liberal		Swing	+3.3	

Stanley succeed to the peerage, becoming 15th Earl of Derby and causing a by-election.

By-election, 9 December 1869: King's Lynn (1 seat)
Party	Candidate	Votes	%	±%
Conservative	Claud Hamilton	1,051	50.5	−15.8
Liberal	Richard Young	1,032	49.5	+15.8
Majority		19	1.0	−2.4
Turnout		2,083	82.9 (est)	−4.9
Registered electors		2,514		
Conservative hold		Swing	−15.7	

=== Elections in the 1870s ===
General election 1874: King's Lynn (2 seats)
Party	Candidate	Votes	%	±%
Conservative	Robert Bourke	1,163	28.0	−5.1
Conservative	Claud Hamilton	1,093	26.3	−10.9
Liberal	William ffolkes	999	24.1	+9.2
Liberal	Edmond Wodehouse	895	21.6	+6.7
Majority		94	2.2	−1.2
Turnout		2,075 (est)	84.7 (est)	−3.1
Registered electors		2,450		
Conservative hold		Swing	−7.2	
Conservative hold		Swing	−8.8	

=== Elections in the 1880s ===
General election 1880: King's Lynn (2 seats)
Party	Candidate	Votes	%	±%
Liberal	William ffolkes	1,286	26.3	+2.2
Conservative	Robert Bourke	1,257	25.7	−2.3
Conservative	Claud Hamilton	1,192	24.4	−1.9
Liberal	Frank Lockwood	1,151	23.6	+2.0
Turnout		2,443 (est)	87.9 (est)	+3.2
Registered electors		2,779		
Majority		84	1.9	N/A
Liberal gain from Conservative		Swing	+2.1	
Majority		106	2.1	−0.1
Conservative hold		Swing	−2.2	

- representation reduced to one member

Sir William ffolkes

General election 1885: King's Lynn
Party	Candidate	Votes	%	±%
Conservative	Robert Bourke	1,472	53.1	+3.0
Liberal	William ffolkes	1,302	46.9	−3.0
Majority		170	6.2	+4.1
Turnout		2,774	89.7	+1.8 (est)
Registered electors		3,094		
Conservative hold		Swing	+3.0	

General election 1886: King's Lynn
Party	Candidate	Votes	%	±%
Conservative	Robert Bourke	1,417	55.3	+2.2
Liberal	John Briscoe	1,146	44.7	−2.2
Majority		271	10.6	+4.4
Turnout		2,563	82.8	−6.9
Registered electors		3,094		
Conservative hold		Swing	+2.2	

Bourke's resignation on appointment as Governor of Madras caused a by-election.

By-election, 25 Aug 1886: King's Lynn
Party	Candidate	Votes	%	±%
Conservative	Weston Jarvis	1,423	54.9	−0.4
Liberal	James Harris Sanders	1,168	45.1	+0.4
Majority		255	9.8	−0.8
Turnout		2,591	83.7	+0.9
Registered electors		3,094		
Conservative hold		Swing	−0.4	

=== Elections in the 1890s ===
General election 1892: King's Lynn
Party	Candidate	Votes	%	±%
Conservative	Thomas Gibson Bowles	1,319	50.2	−5.1
Liberal	Thomas R. Kemp	1,308	49.8	+5.1
Majority		11	0.4	−10.2
Turnout		2,627	88.5	+5.7
Registered electors		2,970		
Conservative hold		Swing	−5.1	

Beaumont

General election 1895: King's Lynn
Party	Candidate	Votes	%	±%
Conservative	Thomas Gibson Bowles	1,395	51.3	+1.1
Liberal	Hubert Beaumont	1,326	48.7	−1.1
Majority		69	2.6	+2.2
Turnout		2,721	91.3	+2.8
Registered electors		2,979		
Conservative hold		Swing	+1.1	

=== Elections in the 1900s ===
General election 1900: King's Lynn
Party	Candidate	Votes	%	±%
Conservative	Thomas Gibson Bowles	1,499	52.9	+1.6
Liberal	Handel Booth	1,332	47.1	−1.6
Majority		167	5.8	+3.2
Turnout		2,831	88.2	−3.1
Registered electors		3,209		
Conservative hold		Swing	+1.6	

C. W. Bellairs

General election 1906: King's Lynn
Party	Candidate	Votes	%	±%
Liberal	Carlyon Bellairs	1,506	43.8	−3.3
Ind. Conservative	Thomas Gibson Bowles	1,164	33.8	−19.1
Conservative	Alan Burgoyne	772	22.4	−30.5
Majority		342	10.0	N/A
Turnout		3,442	93.2	+5.0
Registered electors		3,692		
Liberal gain from Conservative		Swing	+13.6	

=== Elections in the 1910s ===
General election January 1910: King's Lynn
Party	Candidate	Votes	%	±%
Liberal	Thomas Gibson Bowles	1,900	53.7	+9.9
Conservative	Edward Cadogan	1,638	46.3	+23.9
Majority		262	7.4	−2.6
Turnout		3,538	94.2	+1.0
Registered electors		3,755		
Liberal hold		Swing	−7.0	

General election December 1910: King's Lynn
Party	Candidate	Votes	%	±%
Conservative	Holcombe Ingleby	1,765	51.4	+5.1
Liberal	Thomas Gibson Bowles	1,668	48.6	−5.1
Majority		97	2.8	N/A
Turnout		3,433	91.4	−2.8
Registered electors		3,755		
Conservative gain from Liberal		Swing	+5.1	

General Election 1914/15

Another General Election was required to take place before the end of 1915. The political parties had been making preparations for an election to take place from 1914 and by the end of this year, the following candidates had been selected;

- Unionist: Holcombe Ingleby
- Liberal:

General election 1918: King's Lynn
Party		Candidate	Votes	%	±%
C	Unionist	Neville Jodrell	10,146	50.9	−0.5
	Labour	Robert Barrie Walker	9,780	49.1	New
Majority			366	1.8	−1.0
Turnout			19,926	59.7	−31.7
Registered electors			33,349		
	Unionist hold		Swing		
C indicates candidate endorsed by the coalition government.

=== Elections in the 1920s ===
General election 1922: King's Lynn
Party	Candidate	Votes	%	±%
Unionist	Neville Jodrell	9,862	37.2	−13.7
Labour	Robert Barrie Walker	8,683	32.7	−16.4
Liberal	Graham Woodwark	7,970	30.1	New
Majority		1,179	4.5	+2.7
Turnout		26,515	75.5	+15.8
Registered electors		35,131		
Unionist hold		Swing	+1.4	

General election 1923: King's Lynn
Party	Candidate	Votes	%	±%
Liberal	Graham Woodwark	9,943	38.7	+8.6
Unionist	Neville Jodrell	9,266	36.1	−1.1
Labour	John Stevenson	6,488	25.2	−6.5
Majority		677	2.6	N/A
Turnout		25,697	71.9	−3.6
Registered electors		35,754		
Liberal gain from Unionist		Swing	+4.9	

General election 1924: King's Lynn
Party	Candidate	Votes	%	±%
Unionist	Maurice Roche	11,710	41.6	+5.5
Liberal	Graham Woodwark	9,184	32.6	−6.1
Labour	John Stevenson	7,280	25.8	+0.6
Majority		2,526	9.0	N/A
Turnout		28,714	77.6	+5.7
Registered electors		36,289		
Unionist gain from Liberal		Swing	+5.8	

General election 1929: King's Lynn
Party	Candidate	Votes	%	±%
Unionist	Maurice Roche	14,501	40.7	−0.9
Liberal	William Bertram Mitford	10,806	30.3	−2.3
Labour	John Maynard	10,356	29.0	+3.2
Majority		3,695	10.4	+1.4
Turnout		35,663	79.1	+1.5
Registered electors		45,103		
Unionist hold		Swing	+0.7	

=== Elections in the 1930s ===
General election 1931: King's Lynn
Party	Candidate	Votes	%	±%
Conservative	Maurice Roche	23,687	70.2	+29.5
Labour	David Freeman	10,054	29.8	+0.8
Majority		13,633	40.4	+30.0
Turnout		33,741	72.6	−6.5
Conservative hold		Swing		

General election 1935: King's Lynn
Party	Candidate	Votes	%	±%
Conservative	Somerset Maxwell	17,492	50.0	−20.2
Labour	F Emerson	12,062	34.5	+4.7
Liberal	Frank Ongley Darvall	5,418	15.5	New
Majority		5,430	15.5	−24.9
Turnout		34,972	71.7	−0.9
Conservative hold		Swing		

=== Elections in the 1940s ===
General Election 1939/40:

Another General Election was required to take place before the end of 1940. The political parties had been making preparations for an election to take place from 1939 and by the end of this year, the following candidates had been selected;

- Conservative: Somerset Maxwell
- Labour: Frederick Wise
- Liberal: Robert Hugh Kerkham
- British Union: A E Ilett

1943 King's Lynn by-election
Party	Candidate	Votes	%	±%
Conservative	Edmund Roche	10,696	54.2	+4.2
Independent Labour	Frederick Wise	9,027	45.8	New
Majority		1,669	8.4	−7.1
Turnout		9,723	39.8	−31.9
Conservative hold		Swing		

General election 1945: King's Lynn
Party	Candidate	Votes	%	±%
Labour	Frederick Wise	18,202	48.7	+14.2
Conservative	Donald McCullough	14,928	39.9	−10.1
Liberal	Alexander Peckover Doyle Penrose	3,796	10.2	−5.3
Independent	Geoffrey Bowles	444	1.2	New
Majority		3,274	8.8	N/A
Turnout		37,370	73.3	+1.6
Labour gain from Conservative		Swing		

=== Elections in the 1950s ===
General election 1950: King's Lynn
Party	Candidate	Votes	%	±%
Labour	Frederick Wise	19,399	45.33	−3.37
Conservative	Ronald Scott-Miller	19,129	44.70	+4.80
Liberal	Richard Arden Winch	4,266	9.97	−0.23
Majority		270	0.63	−8.17
Turnout		42,794	83.84	+10.54
Registered electors		51,043		
Labour hold		Swing	−4.09	

General election 1951: King's Lynn
Party	Candidate	Votes	%	±%
Conservative	Ronald Scott-Miller	21,954	51.09	+6.39
Labour	Frederick Wise	21,017	48.91	+3.58
Majority		937	2.18	N/A
Turnout		42,791	82.77	−1.07
Registered electors		51,914		
Conservative gain from Labour		Swing	+1.41	

General election 1955: King's Lynn
Party	Candidate	Votes	%	±%
Conservative	Ronald Scott-Miller	20,949	51.65	+0.56
Labour	Hugh Lawson	19,611	48.35	−0.56
Majority		1,338	3.30	+1.12
Turnout		40,560	78.20	−4.57
Registered electors		51,867		
Conservative hold		Swing	+0.56	

General election 1959: King's Lynn
Party	Candidate	Votes	%	±%
Conservative	Denys Bullard	21,671	52.12	+0.47
Labour	Colin Jackson	19,906	47.88	−0.47
Majority		1,765	4.24	+0.94
Turnout		41,577	79.76	+1.56
Registered electors		52,125		
Conservative hold		Swing	+0.47	

=== Elections in the 1960s ===
General election 1964: King's Lynn
Party	Candidate	Votes	%	±%
Labour	Derek Page	21,460	50.12	+2.24
Conservative	Denys Bullard	21,356	49.88	−2.24
Majority		104	0.24	N/A
Turnout		42,816	80.50	+0.74
Registered electors		53,186		
Labour gain from Conservative		Swing	+2.24	

General election 1966: King's Lynn
Party	Candidate	Votes	%	±%
Labour	Derek Page	23,324	52.26	+2.14
Conservative	Denys Bullard	21,305	47.74	−2.14
Majority		2,019	4.52	+4.28
Turnout		44,629	82.90	+2.40
Registered electors		53,832		
Labour hold		Swing	+2.14	

=== Elections in the 1970s ===
General election 1970: King's Lynn
Party	Candidate	Votes	%	±%
Conservative	Christopher Brocklebank-Fowler	23,822	50.03	+2.29
Labour	Derek Page	23,789	49.97	−2.29
Majority		33	0.06	N/A
Turnout		47,611	78.23	−4.67
Registered electors		60.857		
Conservative gain from Labour		Swing	+2.29	

== Sources ==
- Robert Beatson, A Chronological Register of Both Houses of Parliament (London: Longman, Hurst, Res & Orme, 1807)
- D Brunton & D H Pennington, Members of the Long Parliament (London: George Allen & Unwin, 1954)
- Cobbett's Parliamentary history of England, from the Norman Conquest in 1066 to the year 1803 (London: Thomas Hansard, 1808)
- F W S Craig, British Parliamentary Election Results 1832–1885 (2nd edition, Aldershot: Parliamentary Research Services, 1989)
- Craig, F. W. S. (1983) [1969]. British parliamentary election results 1918–1949 (3rd ed.). Chichester: Parliamentary Research Services. ISBN 0-900178-06-X.
- The Constitutional Year Book for 1913 (London: National Union of Conservative and Unionist Associations, 1913)
- J E Neale, The Elizabethan House of Commons (London: Jonathan Cape, 1949)
- Leigh Rayment's Historical List of MPs – Constituencies beginning with "K" (part 2)

Parliament of the United Kingdom
New title	Constituency represented by the prime minister 1721–1742	Vacant until 1743 Title next held by Sussex
