= John Bilney (MP for Bishop's Lynn) =

English politician

John Bilney of Bishop's Lynn, Norfolk (fl. 1402–1415) was an English politician. He sat as MP for Bishop's Lynn in April 1414.

He purchased his admission as a freeman of Bishop's Lynn in 1402–1403.
