= John Cotes (died 1821) =

English politician

John Cotes (1749-1821) was MP for two constituencies. He sat for Wigan from 1782 to 1802 as a Tory, and for Shropshire from 1806 until his death as a Whig.

His son also named John was an MP too.

== Sources ==
- Biography at the History of Parliament
