= Richard Winfrey =

UK politician & publisher (1858–1944)

Richard Winfrey MP, circa 1906

Sir Richard Winfrey (5 August 1858 – 18 April 1944) was a British Liberal Party politician, newspaper publisher and campaigner for agricultural rights. He served as Member of Parliament for South West Norfolk, 1906–1923, and for Gainsborough, 1923–1924.

== Biography ==
Winfrey was born at Long Sutton in Lincolnshire on 5 August 1858. He married Annie Lucy Pattinson of Ruskington, Lincolnshire, in 1897. His wife's brothers, Samuel Pattinson (1870–1942) and Sir Robert Pattinson (1872–1954), were later both Liberal MPs; Samuel for Horncastle from 1922 to 1924 and Robert for Grantham from 1922 to 1923. In religion Winfrey was a Congregationalist. He was made a Knight Bachelor in 1914.

He died on 18 April 1944 in Castor House, Castor, Peterborough.

== Publishing ==
In 1887, Richard Winfrey purchased the Spalding Guardian, a local newspaper that was to provide the basis for the Winfrey family's newspaper interests. His next purchase was the Lynn News; he also started the North Cambs Echo and bought the Peterborough Advertiser.

During World War II Winfrey's newspaper interests began to be passed over to his son, Richard Pattinson 'Pat' Winfrey (1902–1985) who had himself unsuccessfully stood in the Holland with Boston by-election in 1924. In 1947, under the direction of Pat Winfrey, the family's newspaper titles were consolidated to form the East Midland Allied Press, later the EMAP media group.

== Politics ==
Winfrey stood in eight general elections. He first contested South West Norfolk as a Liberal at the general election of 1895

General election 1895 South West Norfolk Electorate 9,119
Party	Candidate	Votes	%	±%
Conservative	Thomas Leigh Hare	3,968	51.3	
Liberal	Richard Winfrey	3,762	48.7	
Majority		206	2.6	
Turnout		7,730	84.8	
Conservative hold		Swing		

and tried again in 1900.

General election 1900 South West Norfolk Electorate 8,740
Party	Candidate	Votes	%	±%
Conservative	Thomas Leigh Hare	3,702	50.4	−0.9
Liberal	Richard Winfrey	3,636	49.6	+0.9
Majority		66	0.8	−1.8
Turnout		7,338	84.0	−0.8
Conservative hold		Swing	-0.9	

He was elected Liberal MP for South West Norfolk at the 1906 Liberal landslide election

General election 1906 South West Norfolk Electorate 8,936
Party	Candidate	Votes	%	±%
Liberal	Richard Winfrey	4,416	55.7	+6.1
Conservative	Sir Thomas Leigh Hare	3,513	44.3	−6.1
Majority		903	10.4	12.2
Turnout		7,929	88.7	+4.7
Liberal gain from Conservative		Swing	+6.1	

and he held the seat

General election January 1910 South West Norfolk Electorate 9,045
Party	Candidate	Votes	%	±%
Liberal	Richard Winfrey	4,239	51.5	−4.2
Conservative	Sir Thomas Leigh Hare	4,000	48.5	+4.2
Majority		239	3.0	−8.4
Turnout		8,239	91.1	+2.4
Liberal hold		Swing	-4.2	

General election December 1910 South West Norfolk Electorate 9,045
Party	Candidate	Votes	%	±%
Liberal	Richard Winfrey	4,176	52.7	+1.2
Conservative	Albert Edward Stanley Clarke	3,745	47.3	−1.2
Majority		431	5.4	+2.4
Turnout		7,921	87.6	−3.5
Liberal hold		Swing	+1.2	

with the help of the Coalition Coupon

General election 1918 South West Norfolk Electorate
Party	Candidate	Votes	%	±%
Liberal	1. Sir Richard Winfrey	unopposed	n/a	n/a
Liberal hold		Swing	n/a	

General election 1922: South West Norfolk Electorate 32,305
Party	Candidate	Votes	%	±%
Liberal	Sir Richard Winfrey	10,432	54.7	n/a
Labour	William Benjamin Taylor	8,655	45.3	n/a
Majority		1,777	9.4	n/a
Turnout		19,087	59.1	n/a
Liberal hold		Swing	n/a	

until 1923. He also represented Gainsborough from 1923 to 1924.

General election 1923 Electorate 27,294
Party	Candidate	Votes	%	±%
Liberal	Sir Richard Winfrey	9,694	47.1	
Unionist	John Elsdale Molson	7,841	38.1	
Labour	James Read	3,039	14.8	
Majority		1,853	9.0	
Turnout		20,574	75.4	
Liberal gain from Unionist		Swing		

General election 1924 Electorate 27,619
Party	Candidate	Votes	%	±%
Unionist	Harry Crookshank	10,281	47.1	+9.0
Labour	F. J. Knowles	5,958	27.3	+12.5
Liberal	Sir Richard Winfrey	5,590	25.6	−21.5
Majority		4,323	19.8	28.8
Turnout		21,829	79.0	+3.6
Unionist gain from Liberal		Swing	+10.0	

His first career had been as a chemist, and he steered the Poisons and Pharmacy Act 1908 through Parliament.

== Office ==

Between 1906 and 1910, Winfrey served as Parliamentary Secretary to Earl Carrington and Parliamentary Secretary to the Board of Agriculture from 1916 to 1918.

In August 1914 as Mayor of Peterborough he was one of the last to read the Riot Act after anti-German disturbances.

Winfrey also served as a Justice of the Peace. He was Chairman of the Lincolnshire and Norfolk Small Holdings Association, Ltd and sometime Chairman of the National Educational Association. At its foundation in 1906 he was Treasurer of the Eastern Counties Agricultural Labourers & Small Holders Union which in 1920 became the National Union of Agricultural and Allied Workers.

Parliament of the United Kingdom
Preceded by Thomas Leigh Hare	Member of Parliament for South West Norfolk; 1906–1923	Succeeded by Alan McLean
Preceded by John Elsdale Molson	Member of Parliament for Gainsborough; 1923–1924	Succeeded by Harry Crookshank
Political offices
Preceded by The Duke of Marlborough; The Viscount Goschen	Joint Parliamentary Secretary to the Board of Agriculture and Fisheries; 1918–1919; With: The Lord Clinton	Succeeded by Sir Arthur Griffith-Boscawen
