= South West Norfolk =

Parliamentary constituency in the United Kingdom, 1885 onwards

Coordinates: 52.6°N 0.6°E

- County constituency for the House of Commons
- Interactive map of boundaries since 2024
- Location within the East of England
- County: Norfolk
- Electorate: 72,496 (March 2020)
- Major settlements: Downham Market, Swaffham and Thetford

Current constituency
- Created: 1885
- Member of Parliament: Terry Jermy (Labour)
- Seats: One
- Created from: South Norfolk and West Norfolk

South West Norfolk is a constituency (Note: A county constituency (for the purposes of election expenses and type of returning officer)) represented in the House of Commons of the UK Parliament since 2024 by Terry Jermy of the Labour Party.

It had been Conservative-won since 1964. It was represented by Liz Truss (the shortest-serving prime minister in British history: for 49 days in 2022) between 2010 and 2024.

== Constituency profile ==
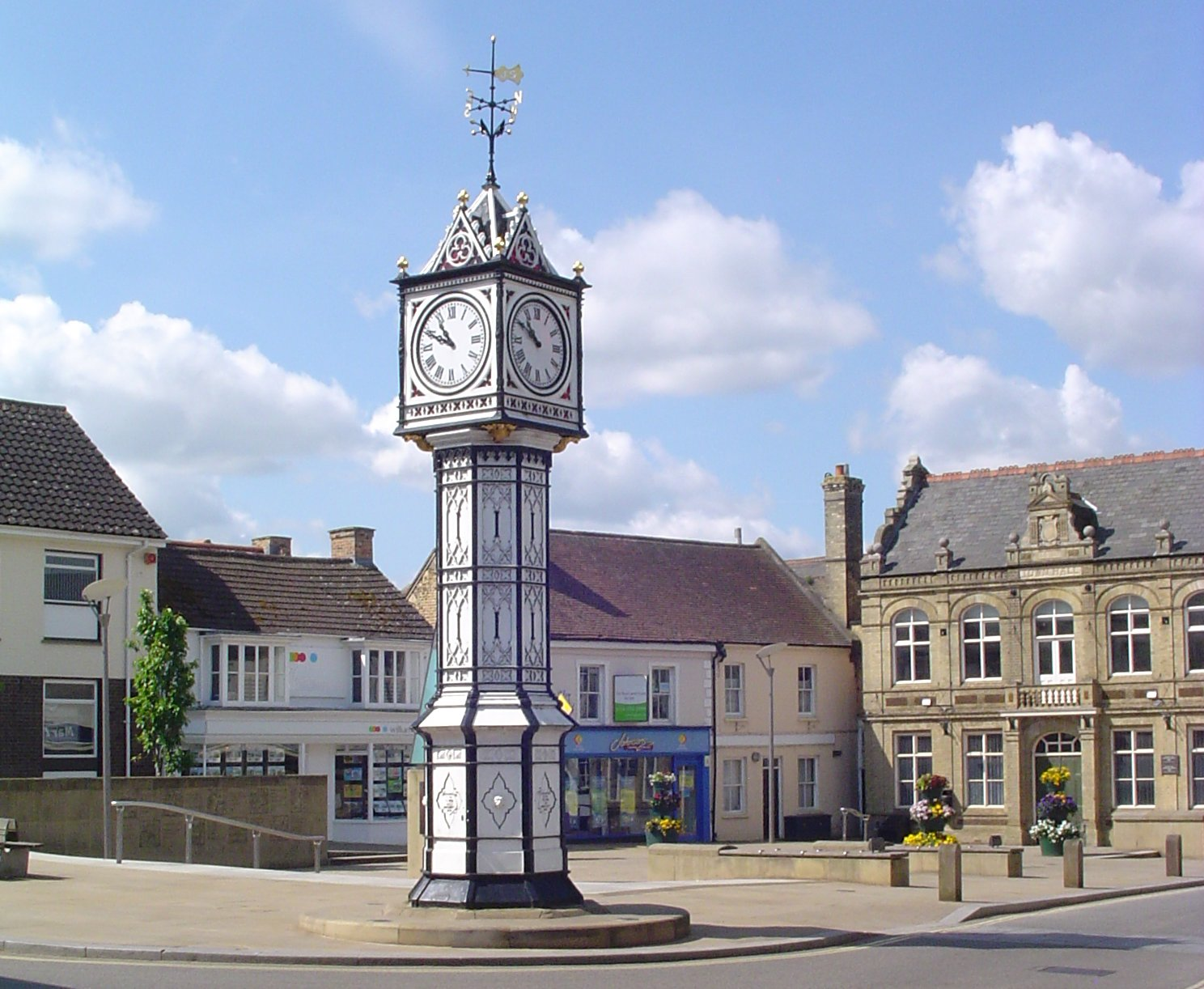
Downham Market

South West Norfolk is a constituency in Norfolk in the East of England, covering parts of the King's Lynn and West Norfolk and Breckland districts. Its largest town is Thetford, which has a population of around 26,000. Other settlements include the towns of Downham Market and Swaffham and the villages of Watlington, Marham, Feltwell and East Harling.

This constituency covers a large, rural area with many small villages. The west of the constituency around Downham Market is part of the Fens, a low-lying agricultural region that was formerly marshland before it was drained centuries ago. Thetford is a historic town that grew rapidly during the late 20th century when many people and businesses were relocated here from London. Surrounding the town is Thetford Forest, which was planted after World War I to recover the country's supply of timber. Most of the constituency has below-average levels of wealth, especially in the Fens which has high levels of deprivation. House prices across the constituency are generally lower than regional and UK averages.

South West Norfolk has low proportions of young and middle-aged adults and a large retired population. Residents have below-average rates of income and average levels of homeownership. The child poverty rate is in line with the overall UK figure. Residents generally have low levels of education and a high proportion work in the agriculture, manufacturing and retail sectors. The percentage claiming unemployment benefits is low. White people made up 96% of the population at the 2021 census.

At the local district council level, most of the constituency is represented by Conservatives with some independents elected around Swaffham and Labour Party councillors elected in Thetford. At the county council, which held elections more recently (in 2026), all seats in this constituency were won by Reform UK. Voters in South West Norfolk strongly supported leaving the European Union in the 2016 referendum; an estimated 67% voted in favour of Brexit compared to the UK-wide figure of 52%.

== History ==
Under the Redistribution of Seats Act 1885, the three two-member county divisions of Norfolk were replaced with six single-member divisions, including the newly created South-Western Division of Norfolk, largely formed from southern parts of the abolished Western Division, including Thetford. From the 1950 general election onwards, it has been formally known as the county constituency of South West Norfolk.

South West Norfolk had been held solidly by Conservatives from 1964 to 2024, but for twenty years prior, it had been ultra-marginal. Labour first held it briefly from 1929 to 1931, and Sidney Dye of the Labour Party gained it in 1945 with a narrow majority of 53 votes. Dye retained the seat at the 1950 general election with an increased, but nevertheless, small majority of 260 votes. He lost it to Denys Bullard of the Conservatives in 1951 by 442 votes and regained the seat from Bullard in 1955 with a small majority of 193 votes. Dye died at the end of 1958, and at the by-election, the Labour Party candidate Albert Hilton retained the seat with an increased majority of 1,354 votes. At the 1959 general election that soon followed, Hilton's safe majority was drastically reduced to a thin margin of 78 votes.

Although Labour had held the seat at two general elections, despite two consecutive overall Conservative victories; the Conservatives won the seat at the 1964 general election, which was a Labour victory nationwide, and the party returned to government after 13 years in opposition. Paul Hawkins, then Gillian Shephard held the seat. Shephard's majority was slashed at the 1997 general election, in what would be the worst defeat nationwide for the Conservative Party in 91 years, before recovering at the 2001 general election. Both occasions resulted in an overall Labour victory.

Shephard decided not to run again in 2005 and was elevated to a peerage. The Conservative Party selected Christopher Fraser, former MP for Mid Dorset and Poole North and he was elected with a comfortable majority of over 10,000 votes.

On 28 May 2009, Fraser announced that he would be standing down at the 2010 general election citing family reasons. This was after his expenses claims were highlighted in The Daily Telegraph; according to the newspaper, Fraser claimed £1,800 in public money for buying 215 trees and marking out the boundary of his second home in the constituency.

Liz Truss was elected to succeed Fraser at the 2010 general election, which saw the Conservatives return to government. Truss served as a Cabinet minister under various Conservative prime ministers since 2014, serving as Environment Secretary between 2014 and 2016 under the leadership of David Cameron, Secretary of State for Justice and Lord Chancellor between 2016 and 2017 under the leadership of Theresa May, and Secretary of State for International Trade and President of the Board of Trade between 2019 and 2021 under the leadership of Boris Johnson; before she was promoted to serve as Foreign Secretary in 2021. In 2022, Truss won the 2022 Conservative leadership election and was subsequently appointed Prime Minister on 6 September. Truss resigned as Prime Minister of the United Kingdom on 25 October 2022. Truss lost her seat to Terry Jermy of the Labour Party at the 2024 general election, a landslide victory for Labour nationally. Her defeat was described by The Spectator as a "Portillo moment".

== Boundaries and boundary changes ==
=== Historic ===
==== 1885–1918 ====
- The part of the Municipal Borough of Thetford in the county of Norfolk; and
- The Sessional Divisions of Clackclose, Grimshoe, South Greenhoe, and Wayland.

Formed from southern parts of the abolished Western Division of Norfolk.

==== 1918–1950 ====
- The Municipal Borough of Thetford;
- The Urban Districts of Downham Market, East Dereham, and Swaffham;
- The Rural Districts of Mitford and Launditch, and Swaffham; and
- Parts of the Rural Districts of Downham, Marshland, and Thetford.

The seat gained northern areas of the abolished Mid Division of Norfolk, including East Dereham, and a small area in the south of the Northern Division. Transferred a small area in the east to the Southern Division.

==== 1950–1983 ====
- The Urban Districts of Downham Market, East Dereham, and Swaffham; and
- The Rural Districts of Downham, Mitford and Launditch, and Swaffham.

Thetford transferred to South Norfolk. Minor changes to boundary with King's Lynn to align with boundaries of local authorities.

==== 1983–2010 ====
- The District of Breckland wards of All Saints, Besthorpe, Buckenham, Conifer, East Guiltcross, Haggard De Toni, Harling, Haverscroft, Heathlands, Mid Forest, Nar Valley, Necton, Peddars Way, Queen's, Swaffham, Templar, Thetford Abbey, Thetford Barnham Cross, Thetford Guildhall, Thetford Saxon, Watton, Wayland, Weeting, West Guiltcross, and Wissey; and
- The Borough of King's Lynn and West Norfolk wards of Airfield, Denton, Denver, Downham Market, Emneth, Ten Mile, Upwell Outwell and Delph, Watlington, and Wissey.

Thetford transferred back from South Norfolk, together with areas comprising the former Rural District of Wayland, including Attleborough. North-eastern areas, including East Dereham, transferred to the re-established constituency of Mid Norfolk. Minor re-alignment of boundary with North West Norfolk.

==== 2010–2024 ====
Map of boundaries 2010–2024

- The District of Breckland wards of Conifer, East Guiltcross, Harling and Heathlands, Mid Forest, Nar Valley, Swaffham, Thetford Abbey, Thetford Castle, Thetford Guildhall, Thetford Saxon, Wayland, Weeting, and West Guiltcross; and
- The Borough of King's Lynn and West Norfolk wards of Airfield, Denton, Downham Old Town, East Downham, Emneth with Outwell, Hilgay with Denver, Mershe Lande, North Downham, St Lawrence, South Downham, Upwell and Delph, Walton, Watlington, Wiggenhall, and Wimbotsham with Fincham Wissey.

As a result of the Boundary Commission's report which came into effect for the 2010 general election, South West Norfolk gained wards from neighbouring North West Norfolk including Walpole, Tilney St Lawrence, and Wiggenhall villages. It lost to Mid Norfolk the wards of All Saints, Buckenham, Burgh and Haverscroft, Haggard De Toni, Necton, Queen's, Templar and Watton, which included the villages of Necton, Great Ellingham and Watton.

=== Current ===
Further to the 2023 review of Westminster constituencies, which came into effect for the 2024 general election, the composition of the constituency is as follows (as they existed on 1 December 2020):

- The District of Breckland wards of: Ashill; Bedingfeld; Forest; Guiltcross; Harling & Heathlands; Nar Valley; Swaffham; Thetford Boudica; Thetford Burrell; Thetford Castle; Thetford Priory.
- The Borough of King's Lynn and West Norfolk wards of: Airfield; Denver; Downham Old Town; East Downham; Emneth & Outwell; Feltwell; Methwold; North Downham; South Downham; Tilney, Mershe Lande & Wiggenhall; Upwell & Delph; Watlington; Wissey.

The boundaries of the seat were redrawn as a result of modifications to ward boundaries in both local authorities, resulting in the small net loss of voters to both neighbouring constituencies of Mid Norfolk and North West Norfolk.

The constituency includes Downham Market, Swaffham, Thetford, Outwell, Upwell, and Feltwell.

== Members of Parliament ==
Western Division of Norfolk prior to 1885

Election	Member	Party
1885	William Tyssen-Amherst	Conservative
1892	Sir Thomas Hare	Conservative
1906	Richard Winfrey	Liberal
1916	Richard Winfrey	Coalition Liberal
1922	Richard Winfrey	National Liberal
Nov 1923	Richard Winfrey	Liberal
Dec 1923	Alan McLean	Conservative
1929	William Benjamin Taylor	Labour
1931	Alan McLean	Conservative
1935	Somerset de Chair	Conservative
1945	Sidney Dye	Labour
1951	Denys Bullard	Conservative
1955	Sidney Dye	Labour
1959 by-election	Albert Hilton	Labour
1964	Paul Hawkins	Conservative
1987	Gillian Shephard	Conservative
2005	Christopher Fraser	Conservative
2010	Liz Truss	Conservative
2024	Terry Jermy	Labour

== Elections ==
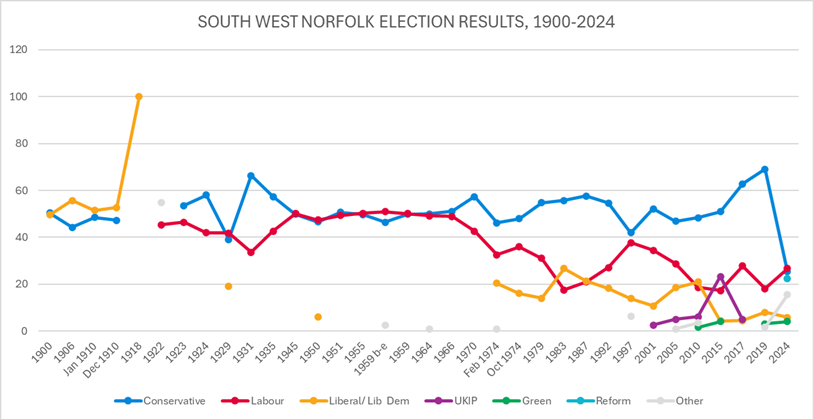
Election results 1900–2024

=== Elections in the 2020s ===
General election 2024: South West Norfolk
Party	Candidate	Votes	%	±%
Labour	Terry Jermy	11,847	26.7	+8.4
Conservative	Liz Truss	11,217	25.3	–43.4
Reform	Toby McKenzie	9,958	22.4	New
Independent	James Bagge	6,282	14.2	New
Liberal Democrats	Josie Ratcliffe	2,618	5.9	−2.4
Green	Pallavi Devulapalli	1,838	4.1	+1.1
Monster Raving Loony	Earl Elvis of East Anglia	338	0.8	−0.9
Heritage	Gary Conway	160	0.4	New
Communist	Lorraine Douglas	77	0.2	New
Majority		630	1.4	
Turnout		44,335	59.3	–6.3
Labour gain from Conservative		Swing	+25.8	

2019 notional result
Party	Vote	%
Conservative	32,988	68.7
Labour	8,808	18.3
Liberal Democrats	3,965	8.3
Green	1,452	3.0
Others	871	1.7
Turnout	48,049	66.3
Electorate	72,496	

=== Elections in the 2010s ===
General election 2019: South West Norfolk
Party	Candidate	Votes	%	±%
Conservative	Liz Truss	35,507	69.0	+6.2
Labour	Emily Blake	9,312	18.1	−9.7
Liberal Democrats	Josie Ratcliffe	4,166	8.1	+3.6
Green	Pallavi Devulapalli	1,645	3.2	N/A
Monster Raving Loony	Earl Elvis of Outwell	836	1.6	N/A
Majority		26,195	50.9	+15.9
Turnout		51,466	65.6	−1.7
Conservative hold		Swing	+8.0	

General election 2017: South West Norfolk
Party	Candidate	Votes	%	±%
Conservative	Liz Truss	32,894	62.8	+11.9
Labour	Peter Smith	14,582	27.8	+10.5
UKIP	David Williams	2,575	4.9	−18.4
Liberal Democrats	Stephen Gordon	2,365	4.5	+0.1
Majority		18,312	35.0	+7.4
Turnout		52,416	67.3	+2.2
Conservative hold		Swing	+0.7	

General election 2015: South West Norfolk
Party	Candidate	Votes	%	±%
Conservative	Liz Truss	25,515	50.9	+2.6
UKIP	Paul Smyth	11,654	23.3	+17.1
Labour	Peter Smith	8,649	17.3	−1.3
Liberal Democrats	Rupert Moss-Eccard	2,217	4.4	−17.2
Green	Sandra Walmsley	2,075	4.1	+2.4
Majority		13,861	27.6	+0.9
Turnout		50,110	65.1	−1.1
Conservative hold		Swing	−7.2	

General election 2010: South West Norfolk
Party	Candidate	Votes	%	±%
Conservative	Liz Truss	23,753	48.3	
Liberal Democrats	Stephen Gordon	10,613	21.6	
Labour	Peter Smith	9,119	18.6	
UKIP	Kay Hipsey	3,061	6.2	
BNP	Dennis Pearce	1,774	3.6	
Green	Lori Allen	830	1.7	
Majority		13,140	26.7	
Turnout		49,150	66.2	
Conservative hold		Swing		

=== Elections in the 2000s ===
General election 2005: South West Norfolk
Party	Candidate	Votes	%	±%
Conservative	Christopher Fraser	25,881	46.9	−5.3
Labour	Charmaine Morgan	15,795	28.7	−5.8
Liberal Democrats	April Pond	10,207	18.5	+7.8
UKIP	Delia Hall	2,738	5.0	+2.4
Independent	Kim Hayes	506	0.9	N/A
Majority		10,086	18.2	+0.5
Turnout		55,127	62.5	−0.6
Conservative hold		Swing	+0.3	

General election 2001: South West Norfolk
Party	Candidate	Votes	%	±%
Conservative	Gillian Shephard	27,633	52.2	+10.2
Labour	Anne Hanson	18,267	34.5	−3.3
Liberal Democrats	Gordon Dean	5,681	10.7	−3.2
UKIP	Ian Smith	1,368	2.6	N/A
Majority		9,366	17.7	+13.5
Turnout		52,949	63.1	−10.0
Conservative hold		Swing	+6.7	

=== Elections in the 1990s ===
General election 1997: South West Norfolk
Party	Candidate	Votes	%	±%
Conservative	Gillian Shephard	24,694	42.0	−12.6
Labour	Adrian Heffernan	22,230	37.8	+10.7
Liberal Democrats	David J. Bucton	8,178	13.9	−6.3
Referendum	Ronnie J.B. Hoare	3,694	6.3	N/A
Majority		2,464	4.2	−23.3
Turnout		58,796	73.1	−6.2
Conservative hold		Swing	−11.6	

General election 1992: South West Norfolk
Party	Candidate	Votes	%	±%
Conservative	Gillian Shephard	33,637	54.6	−3.0
Labour	Mary Page	16,706	27.1	+6.1
Liberal Democrats	John T. Marsh	11,237	18.2	−3.2
Majority		16,931	27.5	−8.7
Turnout		61,580	79.3	+3.3
Conservative hold		Swing	−4.6	

=== Elections in the 1980s ===
General election 1987: South West Norfolk
Party	Candidate	Votes	%	±%
Conservative	Gillian Shephard	32,519	57.6	+1.9
Liberal (Alliance)	Malcolm Scott	12,083	21.4	−5.3
Labour	Mary Page	11,844	21.0	+3.4
Majority		20,436	36.2	+7.2
Turnout		56,446	76.0	+2.9
Conservative hold		Swing		

General election 1983: South West Norfolk
Party	Candidate	Votes	%	±%
Conservative	Paul Hawkins	28,632	55.7	
Liberal (Alliance)	Brian Baxter	13,722	26.7	
Labour	Alan Rosenberg	9,072	17.6	
Majority		14,910	29.0	
Turnout		51,426	73.1	
Conservative hold		Swing		

=== Elections in the 1970s ===
General election 1979: South West Norfolk
Party	Candidate	Votes	%	±%
Conservative	Paul Hawkins	24,767	54.8	+6.9
Labour	Alan Rosenberg	14,063	31.1	−4.9
Liberal	Brian Baxter	6,363	14.1	−2.0
Majority		10,704	23.7	+11.8
Turnout		45,193	78.0	+1.1
Conservative hold		Swing		

General election October 1974: South West Norfolk
Party	Candidate	Votes	%	±%
Conservative	Paul Hawkins	19,778	47.9	+1.7
Labour	H Toch	14,850	36.0	+3.4
Liberal	Brian Baxter	6,658	16.1	−4.3
Majority		4,928	11.9	−1.5
Turnout		41,286	76.9	−6.1
Conservative hold		Swing		

General election February 1974: South West Norfolk
Party	Candidate	Votes	%	±%
Conservative	Paul Hawkins	20,430	46.2	
Labour	H Toch	14,387	32.6	
Liberal	KW Nash	8,986	20.4	
Independent Powellite	MM McNee	380	0.9	N/A
Majority		6,043	13.4	
Turnout		44,183	83.0	
Conservative hold		Swing		

General election 1970: South West Norfolk
Party	Candidate	Votes	%	±%
Conservative	Paul Hawkins	22,220	57.3	+6.2
Labour	Leslie J Potter	16,572	42.7	−6.2
Majority		5,648	14.6	+12.4
Turnout		38,792	80.5	−3.5
Conservative hold		Swing		

=== Elections in the 1960s ===
General election 1966: South West Norfolk
Party	Candidate	Votes	%	±%
Conservative	Paul Hawkins	17,880	51.1	+1.1
Labour	Noel Insley	17,105	48.9	−0.3
Majority		775	2.2	+1.4
Turnout		34,985	84.0	+2.0
Conservative hold		Swing	+0.6	

General election 1964: South West Norfolk
Party	Candidate	Votes	%	±%
Conservative	Paul Hawkins	16,728	50.0	+0.2
Labour	Albert Hilton	16,605	49.2	−0.2
Independent	Victor Welch	427	0.8	N/A
Majority		123	0.4	N/A
Turnout		33,760	82.0	–1.5
Conservative gain from Labour		Swing	+0.2	

=== Elections in the 1950s ===
General election 1959: South West Norfolk
Party	Candidate	Votes	%	±%
Labour	Albert Hilton	16,858	50.1	−0.9
Conservative	Elaine Kellett	16,780	49.9	+3.5
Majority		78	0.2	−4.3
Turnout		33,638	83.5	
Labour hold		Swing	−2.2	

1959 South West Norfolk by-election
Party	Candidate	Votes	%	±%
Labour	Albert Hilton	15,314	51.0	+0.7
Conservative	Elaine Kellett	13,960	46.4	−3.27
Independent Nationalist	Andrew Fountaine	785	2.6	N/A
Majority		1,354	4.51	+3.9
Turnout		30,059		
Labour hold		Swing		

General election 1955: South West Norfolk
Party	Candidate	Votes	%	±%
Labour	Sidney Dye	16,781	50.3	
Conservative	Denys Bullard	16,588	49.7	
Majority		193	0.6	
Turnout		33,369	82.6	
Labour gain from Conservative		Swing		

General election 1951: South West Norfolk
Party	Candidate	Votes	%	±%
Conservative	Denys Bullard	16,970	50.7	
Labour	Sidney Dye	16,528	49.3	
Majority		442	1.3	
Turnout		33,498	82.6	
Conservative gain from Labour		Swing		

General election 1950: South West Norfolk
Party	Candidate	Votes	%	±%
Labour	Sidney Dye	15,649	47.4	−2.7
Conservative	Denys Bullard	15,389	46.6	−3.3
Liberal	George Stephen Dennis	2,009	6.1	N/A
Majority		260	0.8	+0.6
Turnout		33,047	83.4	+17.5
Labour hold		Swing	+0.3	

=== Election in the 1940s ===
General election 1945: Norfolk South Western
Party	Candidate	Votes	%	±%
Labour	Sidney Dye	15,091	50.1	
Conservative	Somerset de Chair	15,038	49.9	
Majority		53	0.2	
Turnout		30,129	65.9	
Labour gain from Conservative		Swing		

=== Elections in the 1930s ===
General election 1935: Norfolk South Western
Party	Candidate	Votes	%	±%
Conservative	Somerset de Chair	16,060	57.4	
Labour	Sidney Dye	11,943	42.7	
Majority		4,117	14.7	
Turnout		28,003	69.5	
Conservative hold		Swing		

General election 1931: Norfolk South Western
Party	Candidate	Votes	%	±%
Conservative	Alan McLean	19,614	66.3	
Labour	William Taylor	9,952	33.7	
Majority		9,662	32.7	N/A
Turnout		29,566	74.5	
Conservative gain from Labour		Swing		

=== Elections in the 1920s ===
General election 1929: South West Norfolk
Party	Candidate	Votes	%	±%
Labour	William Taylor	12,152	41.8	−0.2
Unionist	Alan McLean	11,382	39.1	−18.9
Liberal	Victor Diederichs Duval	5,556	19.1	N/A
Majority		770	2.7	
Turnout		29,090	74.1	+2.1
Labour gain from Unionist		Swing	+9.4	

General election 1924: South West Norfolk
Party	Candidate	Votes	%	±%
Unionist	Alan McLean	13,838	58.0	+4.5
Labour	William Taylor	10,004	42.0	−4.5
Majority		3,834	16.0	+9.0
Turnout		23,842	72.0	+7.3
Unionist hold		Swing	+4.5	

General election 1923: South West Norfolk
Party	Candidate	Votes	%	±%
Unionist	Alan McLean	11,269	53.5	N/A
Labour	William Taylor	9,779	46.5	+1.2
Majority		1,490	7.0	
Turnout		21,048	64.7	+5.6
Unionist gain from Liberal		Swing		

Winfrey

General election 1922: South West Norfolk
Party	Candidate	Votes	%	±%
National Liberal	Richard Winfrey	10,432	54.7	
Labour	William Taylor	8,655	45.3	
Majority		1,777	9.4	
Turnout		19,087	59.1	
National Liberal hold		Swing		

=== Elections in the 1910s ===
General election 1918: South West Norfolk
Party		Candidate	Votes	%	±%
C	National Liberal	Richard Winfrey	Unopposed		
	National Liberal hold				
C indicates candidate endorsed by the coalition government.

General election December 1910: South West Norfolk
Party	Candidate	Votes	%	±%
Liberal	Richard Winfrey	4,176	52.7	+1.2
Conservative	Albert Edward Stanley Clarke	3,745	47.3	−1.2
Majority		431	5.4	+2.4
Turnout		7,921	87.6	−3.5
Liberal hold		Swing	+1.2	

General election January 1910: South West Norfolk
Party	Candidate	Votes	%	±%
Liberal	Richard Winfrey	4,239	51.5	−4.2
Conservative	Thomas Hare	4,000	48.5	+4.2
Majority		239	3.0	−8.4
Turnout		8,239	91.1	+2.4
Liberal hold		Swing	−4.2	

=== Elections in the 1900s ===
Winfrey

General election 1906: South West Norfolk
Party	Candidate	Votes	%	±%
Liberal	Richard Winfrey	4,416	55.7	+6.1
Conservative	Thomas Hare	3,513	44.3	−6.1
Majority		903	10.4	
Turnout		7,929	88.7	+4.7
Liberal gain from Conservative		Swing	+6.1	

General election 1900: South West Norfolk
Party	Candidate	Votes	%	±%
Conservative	Thomas Hare	3,702	50.4	−0.9
Liberal	Richard Winfrey	3,636	49.6	+0.9
Majority		66	0.8	−1.8
Turnout		7,338	84.0	−0.8
Conservative hold		Swing	−0.9	

=== Elections in the 1890s ===
General election 1895: South West Norfolk
Party	Candidate	Votes	%	±%
Conservative	Thomas Hare	3,968	51.3	−0.9
Liberal	Richard Winfrey	3,762	48.7	+0.9
Majority		206	2.6	−1.8
Turnout		7,730	84.8	−7.2
Conservative hold		Swing	−0.9	

General election 1892: South West Norfolk
Party	Candidate	Votes	%	±%
Conservative	Thomas Hare	4,077	52.2	
Liberal	Henry Lee-Warner	3,739	47.8	
Majority		338	4.4	
Turnout		7,816	92.0	
Conservative hold		Swing		

=== Elections in the 1880s ===
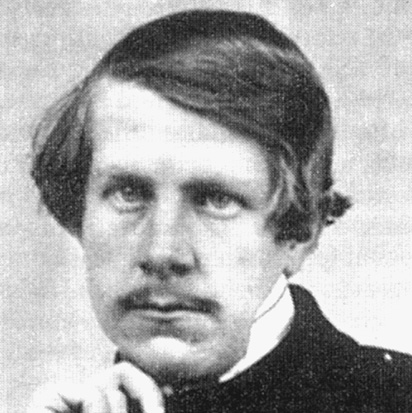
Amherst

General election 1886: South West Norfolk
Party	Candidate	Votes	%	±%
Conservative	William Tyssen-Amherst	Unopposed		
Conservative hold				

General election 1885: South West Norfolk
Party	Candidate	Votes	%
Conservative	William Tyssen-Amherst	4,096	52.0
Liberal	William Gurdon	3,776	48.0
Majority		320	4.0
Turnout		7,872	83.8
Conservative win (new seat)			

== See also ==
- Parliamentary constituencies in Norfolk
- Parliamentary constituencies in the East of England

== Notes ==
Parliament of the United Kingdom
Preceded by Uxbridge and South Ruislip	Constituency represented by the prime minister 2022	Succeeded by Richmond (Yorks)
