= Eastley End House =

Grade II listed house in Runnymede, Surrey, England

- Location within Surrey
- 51°24′35″N 0°31′15″W
- Location: Thorpe
- OS grid reference: TQ0297168888

Site notes
- Area: Surrey
- Architectural style: Georgian
- Owner: Cemex

Listed Building – Grade II
- Official name: Eastley End Hous
- Designated: 3 September 1985
- Reference no.: 1028928

Eastley End House is a Georgian house at the edge of the developed part of Thorpe, Surrey. It is a Grade II listed building, and was formerly part of the headquarters of RMC Group, a division of Cemex.

== Architecture ==
The house was originally built in the late 18th century, and was extended in the early 19th. It is built of red brick, three storeys high, with a prominent projecting bay at the front (west-facing) and a slate roof; there is a one-storey extension on the north, and a two-storey extension to the south.

In 1800, it was described as a modern-built Brick Villa [with] Coach-house for 3 carriages, and Stabling for 11 horses. By 1904, it was considered an imposing Georgian Residence… containing 14 bed, bath, billiard, and four reception rooms… Electric light is installed… Stabling for eight. In 1947 it was given as having 13 bedrooms and 5 reception rooms. By 1985 it was in use as a restaurant, with the main staircase and entrance hall the only remaining original features. It was extensively refurbished after purchase by Readymix Concrete.

== History ==
The house was sold at auction in 1800, and by 1804 was occupied by Captain Temple Hardy, a son of Admiral Charles Hardy. In 1883 the resident was one Henry N. Ritchie, and it was again sold at auction in 1904.

In 1911, the resident of the house, a Lady Hanson, was sued (successfully) by her former cook for libel, after dismissing her claiming grounds of immoral behaviour. It emerged during the trial — causing the Times reporter to describe her as having "a craving for sensationalism" — that Lady Hanson and a surgeon friend from London would regularly go on "burglar hunts" at the weekends:

...on the occasion of Mr. Miles' visits, it was her practice to walk about with him armed with revolvers and with the motor driver carrying an acetylene lamp, for the purpose of looking for burglars...The burglar hunts used sometimes to go on until 2 o'clock in the morning.

It is not entirely clear what these hunts consisted of — on questioning, Mr. Miles said that he arranged them for the "suppression of the presence of tramps", and the head housemaid described them as "usually [taking place] in the garden"

The house was bought by John Satterfield Sandars, formerly the private secretary to Arthur Balfour, for his retirement; he lived there until his death in 1934, and his widow remained there until her death in 1947. By 1957 the house was in the ownership of Albert Otterway, a self-made man and a character from nearby Staines. Albert remained in the house until his death in 1969, when the contents were auctioned, and the house sold to a hotel entrepreneur, Laurence George Morgan.

The Coach house had been sold separately in about 1960 to Colonel H C Bowen OBE, a retired Royal Engineer and chief Engineer for the Thames Conservancy, who converted it into a private dwelling, and renamed it Meadlake House. Meadlake House remained in the Bowen family possession until 1984, when it was sold to Readymix Concrete.

By 1994, Eastley End had also been bought and refurbished as part of the headquarters of Readymix Concrete. The house is the centre of a complex of three buildings, along with the former stable block ("Meadlake House") and a Victorian building ("the Grange"), and contains the offices of the directors.
