= W. B. Taylor =

British farmer and politician

William Benjamin Taylor CBE (22 May 1875 – 29 July 1932) was a British farmer and politician.

Born in Norfolk, Taylor was educated in Watton before becoming a farmer based in Thetford. He was also active in the Congregationalist Church, serving as a lay preacher, and became a magistrate. He was a member of the National Farmers' Union of England and Wales, and stood for the group as an agricultural candidate at the 1918 general election in East Norfolk, but was not elected.

Following his defeat, Taylor joined the Labour Party and was elected to Norfolk County Council. He stood for the party in South West Norfolk, missing out on election in 1922, 1923 and 1924 general election, before finally winning the seat at the 1929 general election. He lost the seat at the 1931 general election, but that year was made a Commander of the Order of the British Empire.

Parliament of the United Kingdom
Preceded by Alan McLean	Member of Parliament for South West Norfolk; 1929–1931	Succeeded by Alan McLean
