= Thomas Leigh Hare =

British politician

Sir Thomas Leigh Hare, 1st Baronet, MVO (4 April 1859 – 22 February 1941) was a British Conservative politician and Member of Parliament. He represented South West Norfolk in the House of Commons between 1892 and 1906.

== Life ==
Thomas Leigh Hare was the illegitimate son of Sir Thomas Hare, 2nd Baronet (1807–1880). He was commissioned as a sub-lieutenant in the part-time Norfolk Artillery Militia on 20 May 1876, later obtaining a regular commission as a lieutenant in the Scots Guards. He was re-appointed to the Norfolk Artillery Militia as a captain on 21 July 1894 and major on 7 May 1904.

Hare and the Liberal Richard Winfrey fought four general elections against each other in South West Norfolk. Winfrey gained the seat at the third attempt and Hare tried to regain it in January 1910.

== Awards and honours ==
Escutcheon of the Hare baronets of Stow Hall (2nd creation, 1905)

He was appointed a Member of the Royal Victorian Order (MVO) in May 1905. The Hare Baronetcy, of Stow Hall in the County of Norfolk, was created in 1905 for him on 21 December; the title became extinct on his death in 1941.

== Family ==
Hare married Lady Ida Cathcart, daughter of Alan Cathcart, 3rd Earl Cathcart and Elizabeth Mary Crompton, on 24 July 1886. They had a daughter Dorothy, who married Charles Wilbraham John Howard RN.

Parliament of the United Kingdom
Preceded by William Tyssen-Amherst	Member of Parliament for South West Norfolk; 1892–1906	Succeeded by Richard Winfrey
Baronetage of the United Kingdom
New creation	Baronet (of Stow Hall); 1905–1941	Extinct
Preceded by Cooper baronets	Hare baronets of Stow Hall; 21 December 1905	Succeeded by Lindsay-Hogg baronets
