= John William Spranger =

Rear-Admiral John William Spranger (died 1822) was a Royal Navy officer active during the French Revolutionary Wars and Napoleonic Wars.

He was appointed Lieutenant on 23 August 1790, and Commander on 7 June 1794. In 1795, he commanded the sloop HMS Rattlesnake in the expedition to capture Cape Town. He commanded a battalion of sailors from the fleet at the Battle of Muizenberg, and was mentioned in both the Army and Navy despatches from this engagement.

He was later recorded as a captain with seniority from 1795, suggesting his appointment to post was made after this engagement; it is certainly known that the promotion of Temple Hardy, the commander of the other sloop at the Cape, was made the day before the despatches were published.

On 2 December 1796, in command of the frigate HMS Crescent, he led a squadron which destroyed a French settlement in Madagascar and captured five merchant vessels. In 1799 he briefly commanded HMS Stately before she became a troopship, and in 1801 took command of the newly commissioned frigate HMS Aeolus, serving in the Baltic Sea and then to the West Indies.

In May 1805 he was in command of the frigate HMS Amethyst, cruising off the Texel, and from the records of one of his crew, it appears he was appointed to the command of HMS Warrior, a 74-gun third-rate, with effect from 12 July 1806. Warrior served first in the Channel squadron and then later in the Mediterranean.

Whilst commanding Warrior in the Mediterranean in 1809, he led the naval portion of the force which captured the Ionian Islands. After Warrior had returned to Chatham for repairs in 1811, he was given command of HMS Barham (74) in 1812, again operating off the Texel.

On 4 June 1814 he was appointed Rear-Admiral of the Blue. He died on 9 February 1822, at Albany in Piccadilly. His will was proven on 2 May 1822, giving his final residence as Pinner in Middlesex.
