= Sidney Dye =

British politician (1900–1958)

Member of Parliament for South West Norfolk
- In office 26 May 1955 – 9 December 1958
- Preceded by: Denys Bullard
- Succeeded by: Albert Hilton
- In office 5 July 1945 – 5 October 1951
- Preceded by: Somerset de Chair
- Succeeded by: Denys Bullard

Personal details
- Born: Sidney Augustus Dye; 4 August 1900
- Died: 9 December 1958 (aged 58)
- Party: Labour

Sidney Augustus Dye, JP (4 August 1900 – 9 December 1958) was a British Labour Party politician.

Born at Wells-next-the-Sea, Norfolk, Sidney Dye was educated at Wells Elementary School but left at the age of thirteen to become an agricultural labourer. He joined the National Union of Agricultural Workers when he was sixteen, soon becoming the branch secretary, and he also became secretary of his local Labour Party. He received a scholarship to Ruskin College, Oxford, where he obtained a diploma in economics and political science, and he then attended the International People's College in Denmark.

In 1924, Dye began working as a full-time Labour Party agent in Dover, then from 1926 until 1931 he was the agent for the Cambridgeshire Constituency Labour Party. He became a tenant farmer in Swaffham in 1932 and was elected to Norfolk County Council in 1934 and Swaffham Rural District Council in 1935. He contested South West Norfolk unsuccessfully in 1935, continuing as a farmer, purchasing his farm during World War II. In the 1945 election, he won the South West Norfolk seat by only 53 votes. In 1950, his majority increased to 260, but he was defeated in the 1951 election. In the 1955 election, Dye regained the seat with a majority of 193. Dye was a founder of the Parliamentary Socialist Christian Group.

On Sunday, 7 December 1958, Dye joined protesters blockading the airbase at RAF North Pickenham, in his constituency, where Thor intermediate-range nuclear missiles were to be based with 220 Squadron RAF. On Monday, 8 December, he travelled to the House of Commons to table a question regarding the protests. On the morning of Tuesday, 9 December 1958, Sidney Dye was killed in a head-on collision with another vehicle near his home in Swaffham. On 18 December, an inquest recorded a verdict of accidental death, after hearing that the brakes on the MP's car, which was less than three years old, were "completely ineffective".

Parliament of the United Kingdom
Preceded by Somerset de Chair	Member of Parliament for South West Norfolk; 1945–1951	Succeeded by Denys Bullard
Preceded by Denys Bullard	Member of Parliament for South West Norfolk; 1955–1958	Succeeded by Albert Hilton
