= Mayor of Peterborough =

Political office in Peterborough, UK

The English city of Peterborough has had a mayor since 1847.

== Current role ==
As well as officiating at ceremonies, and representing the city, the mayor is the impartial chairman of the council.

== List of mayors since 1847 ==
1. 1874–1876 Henry Pearson Gates, JP Gates represented himself, in his capacity as mayor against the crown in R. v Mayor of Peterborough, heard before Blackburn J. The hearing was for a writ of mandamus relating to a procedural matter in a ratepayers meeting to fund corporation (council) opposition to the parliamentary Peterborough Water Bill.
2. 1877 Andrew Percival
3. 1878 William Paley MD, JP
4. 1879 and 80 John Core
5. 1881 and 82 John Thompson JP
6. 1883 John Whitwell
7. 1884 William Barford JP
8. 1885 Edward Vergette
9. 1886 William Daniel Nichols JP
10. 1887 Henry Pearson Gates
11. 1888 and 89 Thomas Lawrence Barrett JP
12. 1890 William Beaver JP
13. 1891 and 92 John Henry Beeby JP
14. 1893 Joseph Clifton
15. 1894 William Daniel Nichols JP
16. 1895 Daniel Henry Redhead JP
17. 1896 and 97 John Thompson JP
18. 1898 Joseph Hunting JP
19. 1899 William Beaver JP
20. 1900 John Thomas Miller JP
21. 1901 G C Wentworth-Fitzwilliam DL JP
22. 1902 and 03 George Keeble JP
23. 1904 William Daniel Nichols JP
24. 1905 Daniel Henry Redhead JP
25. 1906 Thomas C Lamplugh JP
26. 1907 Joseph Batten
27. 1908 Thomas Ivatt Slater JP
28. 1909 John Betts Tebbutt
29. 1910 William Cliffe JP
30. 1911 Charles Edward Crawley
31. 1912 Thomas C Lamplugh JP
32. 1913 John Golby Barford JP
33. 1914 Richard Winfrey JP
34. 1915 John William Williamson JP
35. 1916–1918 George Nicholls OBE, JP
36. 1919 Charles Tomson Vergette
37. 1920 Walter Riseley
38. 1921 Frank Edwin Hunting
39. 1922 Thomas Crosby Lamplugh JP
40. 1923 and 24 Charles Day
41. 1925 Charles Leonard Fletcher
42. 1926 and 27 John Thomas Fisher JP
43. 1928 Thomas Ivatt Slater JP
44. 1929 Arthur John Edward Craig JP
45. 1930 George Samuel Palmer JP
46. 1931 Matthew Hooke
47. 1932 John Mansfield JP
48. 1933 William Oliver Snowden
49. 1934 Arthur Edwin Fletcher
50. 1935 Arthur Itter MA, B Com
51. 1935 and 36 Arthur Holdich Mellows DL, MA, TD
52. 1937 George Clavering Hall JP
53. 1938 Richard Charles Howard
54. 1939 and 40 Lily Violet Bryant
55. 1941 James Alfred Bartram
56. 1942 and 43 Harry Johnson Farrow
57. 1944 Harry Wilfred Kelley JP
58. 1945 Joseph Algernon Farrow
59. 1946 Albert William Viney MBE
60. 1947 John Edward Swain JP
61. 1948–May 1949 Edward Victor Martin
62. 1949–1950 John Richard Hall JP
63. 1950–1951 Harry Ray Horrell
64. 1951–1952 George Rowell Chamberlain
65. 1952–1953 Mabel Wood JP
66. 1953–1954 Arthur Lister Robinson MBE
67. 1954–1955 Reginald William North
68. 1955–1956 Lady (Gladys Mary) Benstead JP
69. 1956–1957 John Walter Setchfield
70. 1957–1958 George Alfred Smith
71. 1958–1959 Royce William Westcombe MBE, JP
72. 1959–1960 Maud Swift
73. 1960–1961 John Azor Savage
74. 1961–1962 Charles William Swift
75. 1962–1963 George Walter Govey
76. 1963–1964 Carl Ernest Hall
77. 1964–1965 Ernest George Edward Bradley
78. 1965–1966 Gordon Tyers
79. 1966–1967 Alfred William Clements MM
80. 1967–1968 Frank Leonard Mackman
81. 1968–1969 Arthur William Leno Adams
82. 1969–1970 George Alfred Forster
83. 1970–1971 Edward Aaron Hall
84. 1971–1972 Dennis William Bracey ChM, FRCS
85. 1972–1973 Roy Topley
86. 1973–1974 Harold Raymond Wentworth Laxton MA
87. 1974–1975 Jack Farrell
88. 1975–1976 William Richard Cashmore
89. 1976–1977 Edward Ernest Titman
90. 1977–1978 Jean Barker
91. 1978–1979 Ben Franklin
92. 1979–1980 Murdoch McKenzie Charteris MBE, AE
93. 1980–1981 Audrey Chalmers
94. 1981–1982 Thomas Arthur Gray
95. 1982 Alfred Richard Shelford ACII, FRSA (died November 1982)
96. 1983 Edward John James (to May 1983)
97. 1983–1984 Kenneth Aubrey Winfield-Chislett
98. 1984–1985 Raymond Palmer JP
99. 1985–1986 Robert Edmund Burke
100. 1986–1987 Joseph Ernest Hall
101. 1987–1988 Rex Eady Perkins JP
102. 1988–1989 Constance Margaret Gray
103. 1989–1990 Derek John Hedges BA, FSCA
104. 1990–1991 Alfred Arthur Sapey
105. 1991–1992 Geoffrey Ronald Ridgway BSc CEng
106. 1992–1993 Leslie Allan Rimes
107. 1993–1994 Kathleen Coppen
108. 1994–1995 Roberta Glenys Ewart Day
109. 1995–1996 John Frederick White Holdich OBE
110. 1996–1997 Mohammed Ayoub Choudhary
111. 1997–1998 Yvonne Lowndes
112. 1998–1999 Mary Beatrice Rainey B.Ed (Hons)
113. 1999–2000 John Ernest Graham Bartlett
114. 2000–2002 Raymond Arthur Pobgee MBE DL
115. 2002–2003 Clifford Stanley Horace Sneesby
116. 2003–2004 David Raines
117. 2004–2005 Raja Akhtar
118. 2005 John Ray Horrell CBE (died December 2005)
119. 2006 David Thorpe (to May 2006)
120. 2006–2007 Michael Burton OBE FRIN
121. 2007–2008 Marion Todd
122. 2008–2009 Patricia Nash MBE
123. 2009–2010 Irene Walsh
124. 2010–2011 Keith Sharp
125. 2011–2012 Paula Thacker MBE
126. 2012–2013 George Simons
127. 2013–2014 June Stokes
128. 2014–2015 David Over
129. 2015–2016 John Peach
130. 2016–2017 David Sanders
131. 2017–2018 John Fox
132. 2018–2019 Christopher Ash
133. 2019–2021 Gul Nawaz
134. 2021–2022 Stephen Lane
135. 2022–2023 Alan Dowson
136. 2023–2024 Nick Sandford
137. 2024–2025 Marco Cereste
138. 2025–2026 Judy Fox
139. 2026–2027 Chris Harper

== See also ==
- Mayor of Cambridgeshire and Peterborough
