= Albert Hilton, Baron Hilton of Upton =

British politician

The Right Honourable The Lord Hilton of Upton JP
- Hilton in 1968

Member of Parliament for South West Norfolk
- In office 25 March 1959 – 25 September 1964
- Preceded by: Sidney Dye
- Succeeded by: Paul Hawkins

Personal details
- Born: 14 February 1908 South Walsham, England
- Died: 3 May 1977 (aged 69)

Albert Victor Hilton, Baron Hilton of Upton, JP (14 February 1908 – 3 May 1977) was a British farm labourer and trade union official who became a Labour Party Member of Parliament and later life peer.

== Farming career ==
Hilton was from a Norfolk family and was born in South Walsham. He attended an elementary school in Upton only before going to work as an agricultural labourer. He was an athletic youth who enjoyed playing football, including for the Norfolk county team in 1932. He was also a Methodist lay preacher from 1932. A member of the National Union of Agricultural Workers, he served as Swaffham Area Organiser for the union.

== Labour Party official ==
In 1936 Hilton, who was an active supporter of the Labour Party, became a full-time Party Agent for East Norfolk Constituency Labour Party. He was responsible for organising the campaign in the East Norfolk by-election of 1939. During the Second World War, Hilton served in the Royal Army Service Corps with the rank of Corporal. He married Nelly Simmons in 1944; they had two sons, both of whom predeceased him.

== Trade union official and councillor ==
Following the end of the war, Hilton moved on from the Labour Party to become an official of the National Union of Agricultural Workers. He was appointed as a Justice of the Peace in 1949, becoming Vice Chairman of the Swaffham Magistrates, and in 1951 was elected to Norfolk County Council.

== By-election candidate ==
The sitting Labour MP for the marginal South West Norfolk constituency, Sidney Dye, was killed in a car accident in December 1958. Hilton was chosen to defend the 193 vote majority in the seat, the first time he had fought a Parliamentary election. With a largely agricultural constituency, he concentrated on issues such as land nationalisation and abolition of tied cottages, and succeeded in winning by 1,354 votes. However, in the general election only a few months later, Hilton squeaked in by only 78 votes.

== Political position ==
Hilton proved a generally loyal MP. In his first months, he signed a motion opposing the stockpiling of United States nuclear weapons in the United Kingdom; on hearing that this stance was not endorsed by the leadership, he withdrew his signature. In the 1960 leadership election, he publicly backed Hugh Gaitskell. He remained involved in his union and in May 1960 was elected as first Vice President; at the end of 1960 Hilton was part of a six-member delegation to Rhodesia and Nyasaland.

In October 1961, Hilton was elected to the National Executive Committee of the Labour Party from the trade union section, replacing the previous nominee of the National Union of Agricultural Workers. In the 1963 Labour Party conference, he replied on behalf of the NEC to a debate on tied cottages, and accepted that a Labour government would make it impossible to evict the tenant of a tied cottage without providing alternative accommodation.

== Defeat ==
Hilton's agricultural constituency was trending away from Labour, against the national swing. At the 1964 general election, he was defeated by the Conservatives. He replaced Edwin Gooch, who had been Labour MP for North Norfolk until his death, as President of the National Union of Agricultural Workers. He was appointed as government member of the board of the British Sugar Corporation Ltd in 1965, and later that year on 11 May was created a life peer, taking the title Baron Hilton of Upton, of Swaffham in the County of Norfolk.

== House of Lords ==
He served as a Lord in Waiting (junior whip) in the House of Lords from 1966. He was also appointed to the East Anglia Economic Planning Council in 1966, and served as Chairman of the National Brotherhood Movement within the Methodist Church in 1967. In 1971, Lord Hilton broke the whip to vote in support of the British application to join the European Communities. His wife died on 3 September 1976, which devastated Hilton who was also suffering ill health and died in 1977 aged 69.

Parliament of the United Kingdom
Preceded by Sidney Dye	Member of Parliament for South West Norfolk; 1959–1964	Succeeded by Paul Hawkins
Political offices
Preceded by The Lord Hobson	Lord-in-waiting; 1966–1970	Succeeded by New government
