= 1905 Prime Minister's Resignation Honours =

British government recognitions

The 1905 Prime Minister's Resignation Honours were awards announced on 9 December 1905 to mark the exit of Prime Minister Arthur James Balfour, who resigned on 5 December.

The recipients of honours are displayed here as they were styled before their new honour, and arranged by honour, with classes (Knight, Knight Grand Cross, etc.) and then divisions (Military, Civil, etc.) as appropriate.

== Viscounts ==
- The Lord Tredegar
- The Right Hon. Sir Michael Hicks Beach Bt MP

== Barons ==
- The Right Hon. C. T. Ritchie MP
- The Right Hon. Sir W. H. Walrond Bt MP
- Sir H. Meysey Thompson Bt MP
- Sir H. de Stern Bt
- Sir A. Harmsworth Bt
- Edmund Beckett Faber MP
- W. H. Grenfell MP

== Privy Councillor ==
- The Solicitor General the Right Hon. Sir E. H. Carson
- J. S. Sandars
- Victor C. W. Cavendish MP
- Sir Charles Dalrymple, 1st Baronet
- Lieut.-Col. Mark Lockwood JP MP

== Baronet ==
- C. Morrison-Bell
- Benjamin Cohen MP
- R. P. Cooper
- Thomas Leigh Hare MP
- Lindsay Hogg MP
- W. B. Hulton
- J. Grant Lawson MP
- Francis Ley
- Edward Mann
- John Davison Milburn
- Herbert Praed

== Knight ==
- W. J. Bull MP
- C. Kinloch-Cooke
- Major W. E. Evans-Gordon MP
- Sir Samuel Faire
- Charles Frederick Claverhouse Graham
- F. W. Lowe MP
- H. E. Moss
- Col. C. Wyndham Murray CB MP
- Major Harry North
- Henry Edward Randall
- J. S. Randles MP
- J. Robinson
- William Henry Vaudrey
- Edgcombe Venning

== Order of the Bath ==
=== Companion of the Order of the Bath (CB) ===
- Malcolm G. Ramsay, Treasury
- J. J. Taylor, Irish Office

== Order of St Michael and St George ==
=== Knight Commander of the Order of St Michael and St George (KCMG) ===
- John Henniker Heaton, MP CB

== Privy Councillor (Ireland) ==
To be sworn of the Privy Council in Ireland:

- Sir R. Blennerhassett, Bt.
- Sir F. E. W. Macnaghten Bt
- Sir Patrick Coll KCB
- J. H. M. Campbell KC MP Attorney-General for Ireland
