= Temple Stanyan =

British writer, historian (1675-1752)

- Born: 8 February 1675; Monken Hadley
- Died: 25 March 1752 (aged 77); Woodcote, Oxfordshire
- Resting place: Church of St Peter and St Paul, Checkendon; 51.5424°N 1.0450°W
- Education: Christ Church, Oxford
- Occupation: Civil servant
- Spouses: Elizabeth Boys (dates unknown); Susannah Hobbs (1721–1725, her death); Grace Pauncefort (? – 1752, his death)
- Parents: Lawrence Stanyan (d. 1725); Dorothy Knapp (d.1730)
- Relatives: Abraham Stanyan (brother); Sir Richard Temple, 3rd Baronet (uncle by marriage); Richard Temple, 1st Viscount Cobham (cousin)
- Writing career
- Language: English
- Period: 1707-1739
- Subject: The history of Ancient Greece
- Notable work: Grecian History

Temple Stanyan (1675–1752) was an English civil servant, politician and writer. He is most known for his Grecian History, first published in 1707, which became a standard work on the history of ancient Greece in the early part of the 18th century.

== Early life ==
Stanyan was born on 8 February 1675 at Monken Hadley, then part of Middlesex. He was one of eight children of Lawrence Stanyan (died 1725), merchant, farmer, and commissioner of the revenue, of Monken Hadley, and Dorothy Stanyan (nee Knapp). One of his older brothers was Abraham Stanyan, who would later serve as the British ambassador to Switzerland, the Ottoman Empire and to Austria. Stanyan's uncle-by-marriage (the husband of an aunt) was Sir Richard Temple, 3rd Baronet, after whom he may have been named.

Stanyan entered Westminster School in 1691 as a Queen's Scholar. He enrolled at Christ Church, Oxford in June 1695 but did not take a degree. In May 1697, Sir Richard Temple died and Stanyan inherited one of his properties, Rawlins Manor (Woodcote Manor) in Oxfordshire.

== Career ==
Stanyan entered government service after leaving Oxford and by 1715 was under-secretary for the Northern Department (the department responsible for foreign relations with Northern European countries). He transferred to the Southern Department (the department for Southern Europe) as under-secretary in 1717, but he lost this position a year later. In 1719, he became Clerk of the Privy Council, succeeding his brother Abraham in the post. In 1724, he also regained the under-secretaryship at the Southern Department.

Stanyan became a Fellow of the Royal Society on 12 May 1726, after being proposed by Francis Nicholson. Abraham Stanyan was a prominent member of the Kit Kat Club, as was his cousin Richard Temple, 1st Viscount Cobham and some sources state Temple was also a member.

In 1731, he was succeeded as Clerk of the Privy Council by Gilbert West, leaving the Southern Department in 1735.

== Personal life ==
Stanyan married three times. His first wife, Elizabeth Boys (née Shirley), was the widow of William Boys. His married his second wife, Susannah Hobbs (bap. 1689, d. 1725), on 3 January 1721. His third marriage was to Grace Pauncefort (1692/3–1768).

Stanyan died at his seat, Rawlins Manor, on 25 March 1752 and was buried at the church of St Peter and St Paul, Checkendon, there is a memorial to him inside the church. (Note: 24 March 1751, is given as the date of his death on his memorial at the church of St Peter and St Paul, Checkendon. However, at the time, the Old style date notation was in use so year was in fact 1752. The Oxford Dictionary of National Biography gives the date as 25 March 1752.)

He was survived by his third wife. His daughter Catherine later became the second wife of Admiral Charles Hardy in 1759. Their eldest son, Temple Hardy, was likely named after Temple Stanyan and was a notable Royal Navy officer during the French Revolutionary wars.

== Works ==
The first volume of his two-volume book Grecian History, from the Original of Greece, to the Death of Philip of Macedon was published in 1707 by Jacob Tonson; there was a 32-year gap before the publication of the second volume in 1739. This was published alongside a second, revised, edition of the first volume.

The Grecian History was the first major English work on ancient Greece that was aimed at the general public and it became very successful. It was the standard work on the topic during the 18th century and editions were published in 1751, 1759, 1766, 1774, 1775 and 1781. It was translated into French by Denis Diderot in 1743. In the work, Stanyan, in common with better-known thinkers such Montesquieu and Rousseau, lavishes praise on Sparta, for being a strong stable state that was immune from factionalism and political unrest. He condemns the democratic constitution of Classical Athens, claiming that it suffered from these failings.

Towards the end of the 18th century, Stanyan's history was superseded by William Mitford's History of Greece, the five volumes of which were published, one by one, between 1783 and 1810. Although later in the 19th century, that work itself came to be seen as flawed as it reflected the author's reactionary politics and his anti-democratic and anti-Jacobin views.

Stanyan made a contribution to a collaborative translation of Ovid's, Metamorphoses edited by Samuel Garth, that was published by Tonson in 1717. Stanyan translated The Story of Polyxena and Hecuba in Book XIII. Other contributors to the work were Alexander Pope, John Dryden, Joseph Addison, William Congreve and Nicholas Rowe. He also contributed to a 1726 collection of English and Latin poems on archery and the Royal Company of Archers and composed the Latin inscription on the plinth of John Michael Rysbrack's 1735 statue of George II at Greenwich Hospital.
