= Annette Brooke =

British Liberal Democrat MP (1947–2025)

The Right Honourable Dame Annette Brooke DBE
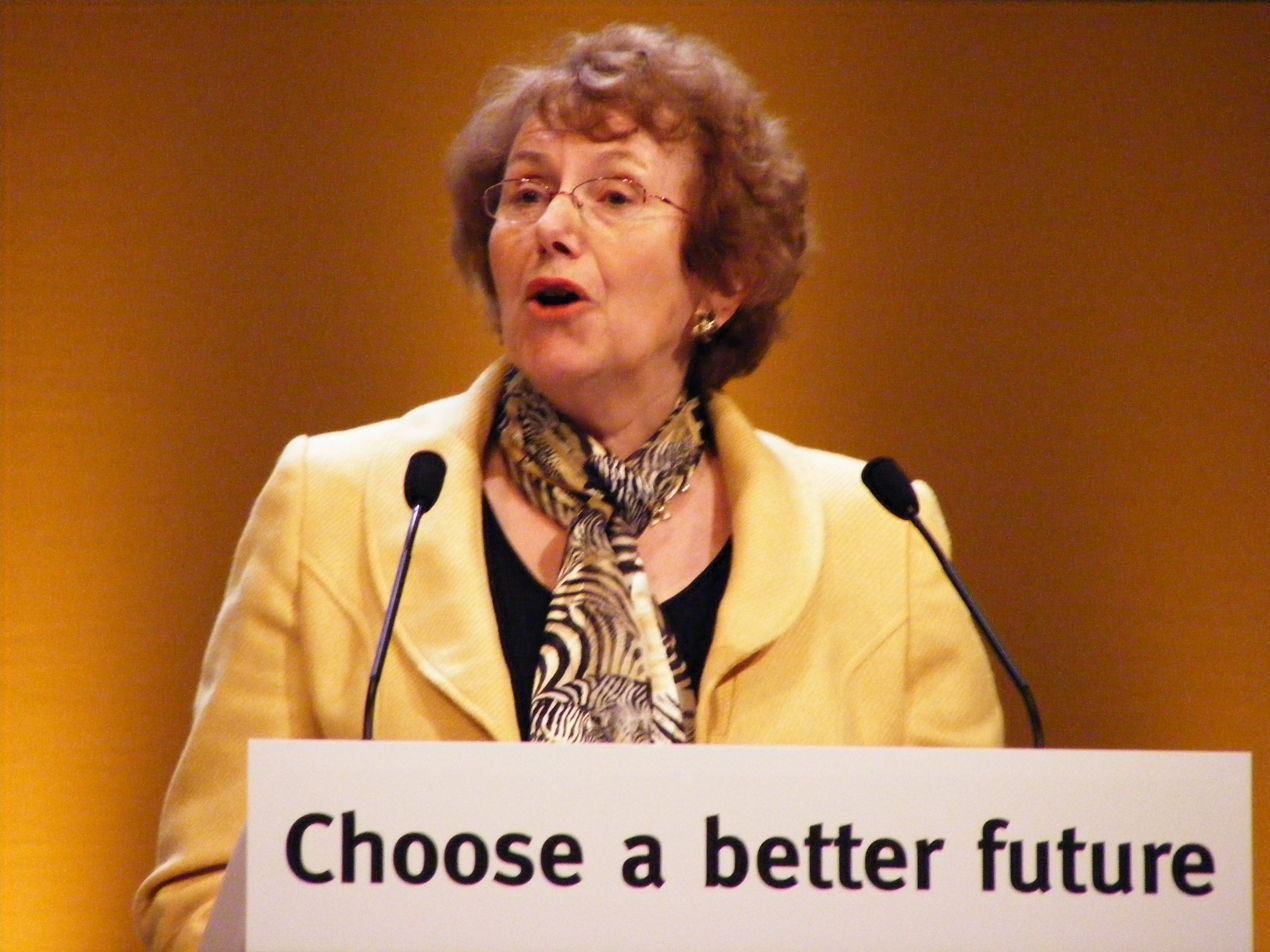
- Brooke at the 2009 Liberal Democrat; Spring Conference

Chair of the Liberal Democrats Parliamentary Party
- In office 5 June 2013 – 30 March 2015
- Leader: Nick Clegg
- Preceded by: Paul Burstow
- Succeeded by: Lisa Smart (2024)

Member of Parliament for Mid Dorset and North Poole
- In office 7 June 2001 – 30 March 2015
- Preceded by: Christopher Fraser
- Succeeded by: Michael Tomlinson

Personal details
- Born: Annette Lesley Kelly; 7 June 1947 Essex, England
- Died: 20 August 2025 (aged 78) Poole, Dorset, England
- Party: Liberal Democrats
- Spouse: Michael Brooke
- Education: London School of Economics; Hughes Hall, Cambridge

Dame Annette Lesley Brooke (née Kelley; 7 June 1947 – 20 August 2025) was a British Liberal Democrat politician. She was the Member of Parliament (MP) for Mid Dorset and North Poole from the 2001 general election to 2015. In 2001, she became the first female MP elected in a general election in Dorset. At the time she left office, Brooke was the longest serving female MP in the history of the Liberal Democrats.

As of 2024, she and fellow Liberal Democrats, Diana Maddock and Vikki Slade, and Labour's Jessica Toale, are the only women to date who represented parliamentary constituencies in Dorset.

== Early life ==
Brooke was born in Essex on 7 June 1947. She was educated at Romford County Technical School in Romford and the London School of Economics, graduating with a BSc degree in economics. She qualified as a teacher at Hughes Hall, Cambridge. She was a tutor with the Open University for 19 years from 1971 and was a school teacher from 1974, including at Aylesbury, and then Head of Economics at the independent Talbot Heath School for Girls in Bournemouth, which she left in 1994.

== Parliamentary career ==
Brooke was elected as a councillor on Poole Borough Council in 1986; she was the council's deputy leader 1995‍–‍97 and 1998‍–‍2000, and the Liberal Democrat Group Leader 2000‍–‍01. She was the Mayor of Poole in 1998. She contested the Conservative-held seat of Mid Dorset and North Poole at the 2001 General Election.

At the previous election the Conservative Christopher Fraser won the seat by 681 votes. In 2001, Brooke was elected by 384 votes and held the seat until 2015 where it was regained by the Conservatives. She made her maiden speech on 21 June 2001.

In Parliament Brooke was made both a Liberal Democrat Whip and a Spokeswoman on Home Affairs by Charles Kennedy in 2001. In 2004 she became a spokeswoman on Children. Following the 2005 General Election (at which Annette Brooke held her seat with a much increased majority of 5,482), she became a spokeswoman on Education and Skills, and carried on in a similar position as spokeswoman on Children, Schools and Families.

In the 2010 General Election, Brooke's majority fell to 269 votes; a reduction of 5,213 votes. Her main challenger for the seat, Nick King (Conservative), secured a swing of 7.7% making her constituency one of the most marginal of the 2010 Election. Following the defeat of Sandra Gidley in the 2010 General Election, Brooke became the longest-serving female Liberal Democrat MP of the 55th parliament.

Brooke announced in 2013 that she would stand down as a Member of Parliament at the next general election in 2015.

== Personal life and death ==
She was married to Michael (a former geology schoolteacher and former Councillor on Poole Borough Council) with two daughters and was a partner in her family's firm selling rocks and mineral, which started up in 1987. They lived in Broadstone.

Brooke died on 20 August 2025, aged 78.

== Honours ==
Brooke was appointed Officer of the Order of the British Empire (OBE) in the 2013 New Year Honours for public and political service. She was elevated to a Dame Commander of the Order of the British Empire (DBE) in the 2015 Dissolution Honours Lists on 27 August 2015. She was appointed to the Privy Council on 16 July 2014.

Parliament of the United Kingdom
Preceded by Christopher Fraser	Member of Parliament for Mid Dorset and North Poole; 2001–2015	Succeeded by Michael Tomlinson
