= Paul Hawkins (politician) =

British politician

Sir Paul Lancelot Hawkins TD (7 August 1912 – 29 December 2002) was a British Conservative Party politician.

Hawkins was born at Downham Market and was educated at Cheltenham College. He was a livestock auctioneer and chartered surveyor, and served as a councillor on Norfolk County Council. He joined the Territorial Army (TA) and served during World War II with the 7th Battalion of the Royal Norfolk Regiment, a TA unit, although his active service was brief as he was captured at Saint-Valery-en-Caux during the final stages of the Battle of France in 1940 and spent the next five years as a prisoner of war.

Hawkins was member of parliament (MP) for South West Norfolk from 1964 to 1987 when he retired. Future minister Gillian Shephard was his successor. Sir Paul was a Government Whip under Edward Heath (1970–1974), serving as an assistant whip 1970–1971, a Lord of the Treasury 1971–1973, and Vice-Chamberlain of the Household 1973–1974. He was knighted in the 1982 Birthday Honours.

Parliament of the United Kingdom
Preceded by Albert Hilton	Member of Parliament for South West Norfolk; 1964–1987	Succeeded by Gillian Shephard
Political offices
Preceded by Walter Clegg	Vice-Chamberlain of the Household; 1973–1974	Succeeded by Don Concannon
