= Temple Hardy =

English naval officer

Captain Temple Hardy
- Born: 14 January 1765; London
- Died: 29 March 1814 (aged 49); Exeter
- Burial place: Exeter Cathedral
- Relatives: Admiral Charles Hardy, father
- Military career
- Allegiance: United Kingdom
- Branch: Royal Navy
- Rank: Captain
- Conflicts: French Revolutionary Wars; Battle of Muizenberg; Napoleonic Wars

Captain Temple Hardy (14 January 1765 – 29 March 1814) was an English naval officer active during the French Revolutionary Wars. He commanded a battalion of sailors during the invasion of the Cape Colony in 1795.

== Early life ==
He was born on 14 January 1765, and christened "Charles Temple Hardy" on 11 February, at Westminster. He was a son of Admiral Charles Hardy, from whom he inherited a house at Rawlins, in Oxfordshire, and £3,000, on his father's death in 1780. He was possibly named after his maternal grandfather, the historian Temple Stanyan.

== Naval career ==
Like his father, he entered the Royal Navy; he was appointed to the rank of Lieutenant on 4 November 1790, and to Commander on 1 June 1794. He commissioned the 16-gun floating battery Firm, staying with her only until September.

In 1795, he commanded the sloop HMS Echo in the expedition to capture Cape Town. He commanded a battalion of sailors from the fleet at the Battle of Muizenberg, with Echo being commanded by a lieutenant from Monarch. He was mentioned in both the Army and Navy despatches:

[The engagement was] ... only remarkable for the steadiness displayed by the 1st battalion of seamen, commanded by Captain Hardy of the Echo, who ... received the enemy's fire without returning a shot, and manoeuvered with a regularity which would not have discredited veteran troops. – Major-General Craig.
I must more particularly beg leave to note the eminent services of Captains Hardy and Spranger ... you will perceive I have given command of the Princess to Captain Hardy, whose acknowledged merit will, I trust, justify my election, and recommend him to their Lordships' confirmation. – Admiral Elphinstone.

A Dutch Indiaman, the Willemstadt en Boetzlaar, which was captured in Table Bay after the engagement was taken into British service as HMS Princess, and as mentioned above briefly commanded by Hardy. He was promoted to Captain on 24 November 1795; this was the day before the despatches were in the London press, with the Admiralty presumably confirming Elphinstone's appointment on receipt.

In April 1797 he was in command of HMS Squirrel, which convoyed a party of British commissioners to the United States of America to settle claims arising from the Treaty of London. On 12 May 1799 he was given command of the Thunderer, a 74-gun third-rate, at Jamaica, and left the ship on 28 July 1800. He married Elizabeth Lucy Warre on 9 December 1800, in the parish of Westminster St James. In 1801, when his mother died, he was still resident at Rawlins and her only surviving son. By 1804 he and his wife were resident in Eastley End House in Thorpe, Surrey.

In May 1805 he was not assigned any command, and in April 1806 was in command of the third-rate Ruby, where he took three Prussian merchantmen as prizes. He commanded the Euryalus for parts of 1806, in an acting capacity. In November 1806, he had to turn down command of the third-rate Defence through illness. In February 1810 he was appointed to command of the third-rate Resolution, which saw service escorting convoys in the Danish Straits. He remained in command when the Resolution was put in ordinary at Portsmouth in 1811. He was given command of Swiftsure on 20 August 1811, but in May 1812, in the Mediterranean, he was taken ill. He was removed from command, and discharged into Port Mahon hospital on 17 June.

== Death ==
He died on 29 March 1814, at Exeter, He was buried at Exeter Cathedral, and a monument to him was erected in the cathedral's South Transept.

His will was proven in London on 9 June 1814. The will, dated 11 September 1811, left his possessions to his wife and to his two unmarried sisters, Clare and Rachael Emilia; minor valuables, and any outstanding prize money were left to his family, his executors, and Captains Blackwood and Otway. The executors, along with his wife, were the Rev. Francis Annesley, of Eydon in Northamptonshire; Captain John William Spranger; and William Groom of Lincoln's Inn Fields. Elizabeth outlived him by twenty years, dying on 2 April 1835, aged 71. The naval officers in his will all became Rear-Admirals through seniority on 4 June 1814, shortly after his death; if he had survived a few months longer, he would likely have attained this rank before his death.

== Notes ==
Note that it is difficult to trace Hardy's career in the Navy. He was serving at the same time as his far more renowned compatriot Sir Thomas Hardy, and contemporary records usually mentioned no more than "Captain Hardy" or "Captain T. Hardy", making it possible that many references to the one may have been confused with the other; see, for example, the entry in the Victoria County History.
