= Denys Bullard =

British politician

Member of Parliament for King's Lynn
- In office 8 October 1959 – 25 September 1964
- Preceded by: Ronald Scott-Miller
- Succeeded by: Derek Page

Member of Parliament for South West Norfolk
- In office 25 October 1951 – 6 May 1955
- Preceded by: Sidney Dye
- Succeeded by: Sidney Dye

Personal details
- Born: Denys Gradwell Bullard; 15 August 1912
- Died: 2 November 1994 (aged 82)
- Party: Conservative

Denys Gradwell Bullard (15 August 1912 – 2 November 1994) was a British farmer and politician. Although he was an entertaining speaker, his political career was a precarious one as he was only elected in marginal constituencies.

== Farming background ==
Born on a farm at Elm, near Wisbech, Bullard went to Wisbech Grammar School and then got into Fitzwilliam House, Cambridge, where he read Natural Sciences and was awarded a first class honours degree. He then went to the Cambridge School of Agriculture where he wrote a postgraduate dissertation on agriculture. Using his academic knowledge, he returned to work on the family farm. At 300 acres (1.2 km^{2}) it was relatively small for the area.

== Politics ==
During the Second World War, his farming duties meant he was not called up. He served as technical adviser to the Huntingdonshire War Agricultural Committee. At the 1950 general election, Bullard was selected as Conservative Party candidate for South West Norfolk, which contained much of the Norfolk farming area. He was pictured on his election address wearing his farming gear among the pigs and potatoes of his farm. Despite a vigorous campaign he lost by 260 votes.

== First term in Parliament ==
When a second general election followed within two years, Bullard fought the seat again and won by 442 votes. In his first year in Parliament, Bullard piloted a Private Members' Bill regulating fireguards. Concentrating on farming issues, he campaigned for agricultural protection and restriction of non-Commonwealth imports, as well as for more drainage schemes and better rural transport. He became friendly with Henry Brooke, who was a rapidly rising junior Minister. In 1955 Brooke, by then Financial Secretary to the Treasury, appointed him as Parliamentary Private Secretary.

== Defeat ==
However, Bullard lost his seat by 193 votes in the 1955 general election, and returned to his farm. He also became a broadcaster, at which his entertaining way of speaking made him a success. Although intending at first not to return to politics, he was persuaded to make another run at becoming a Member of Parliament, this time in King's Lynn constituency.

== Second term in Parliament ==
At the 1959 general election, Bullard won the seat with a majority of over a thousand. Henry Brooke again called on him to be Parliamentary Private Secretary, which he remained until Brooke left office. In 1962 he introduced another Private members Bill which amended the law on drainage rates. His concern with the profitability of the farming industry led him to oppose the application to join the European Economic Community.

== Subsequent career ==
Bullard was again defeated at the 1964 general election, but only by 104 votes. He failed to regain the seat in the 1966 election. He was made a member of the Anglian Water Authority and Chairman of the Broads Committee in 1974. This gave him responsibility for preserving the Norfolk Broads, a delicate environment. Bullard held the post for nine years before retiring.

In retirement, Bullard enjoyed gardening and painting. He married Diana Patricia Cox in 1970. A son, Patrick, was born to the couple in 1973, and a daughter, Elizabeth, in 1975.

Parliament of the United Kingdom
Preceded by Sidney Dye	Member of Parliament for South West Norfolk; 1951–1955	Succeeded by Sidney Dye
Preceded by Ronald Scott-Miller	Member of Parliament for King's Lynn; 1959–1964	Succeeded by Derek Page
