= John Satterfield Sandars =

Political secretary

The Right Honourable John Satterfield Sandars CVO
- John Satterfield Sandars outside Parliament in 1897

Principal Private Secretary to the Prime Minister
- In office 1902–1905
- Prime Minister: Arthur Balfour
- Preceded by: Schomberg Kerr McDonnell
- Succeeded by: Arthur Ponsonby

Personal details
- Born: John Satterfield Sandars; 15 January 1853 Derbyshire
- Died: 29 March 1934 (aged 80) Eastley End House, Thorpe, Surrey
- Spouse: Harriette Grace Mary (m. 1892)
- Education: Repton School
- Alma mater: Magdalen College, Oxford
- Occupation: Barrister
- Awards: CVO (1905)

John Satterfield Sandars CVO (15 January 1853 – 29 March 1934) was a British barrister who served as Private Secretary to Arthur Balfour, Prime Minister of the United Kingdom. He was informally known as 'Jack' Sandars to those close to him.

== Early life ==
John Sandars was the only son of Charles Sandars, an estate and colliery agent of Mackworth, Derbyshire. Educated at the local Repton School, he went on to read law at Magdalen College, Oxford in 1871.

== Career ==
Sandars was called to the Bar by Lincoln's Inn in 1877, practising on the Midland Circuit until 1885, when he was appointed as private secretary to Henry Matthews, the Home Secretary. In the 1892 general election, he unsuccessfully contested the parliamentary seat of Mid-Derbyshire. Three years later, in 1895, he became the private secretary to Arthur Balfour, then Leader of the House of Commons and First Lord of the Treasury. He remained with Balfour until 1911, when the latter resigned as the leader of the Conservative Party.

Sandars was sworn of the Privy Council and appointed CVO in the 1905 Prime Minister's Resignation Honours.

== Personal life ==
He married Harriette Grace Mary, daughter of Sir William Don on 10 August 1892. John Sandars died at home at Eastley End House near Thorpe, Surrey on 29 March 1934 at the age of 80.

Government offices
Preceded by Schomberg Kerr McDonnell	Principal Private Secretary to the Prime Minister; 1902–1905	Succeeded by Arthur Ponsonby
