= Abraham Stanyan =

British diplomat and politician

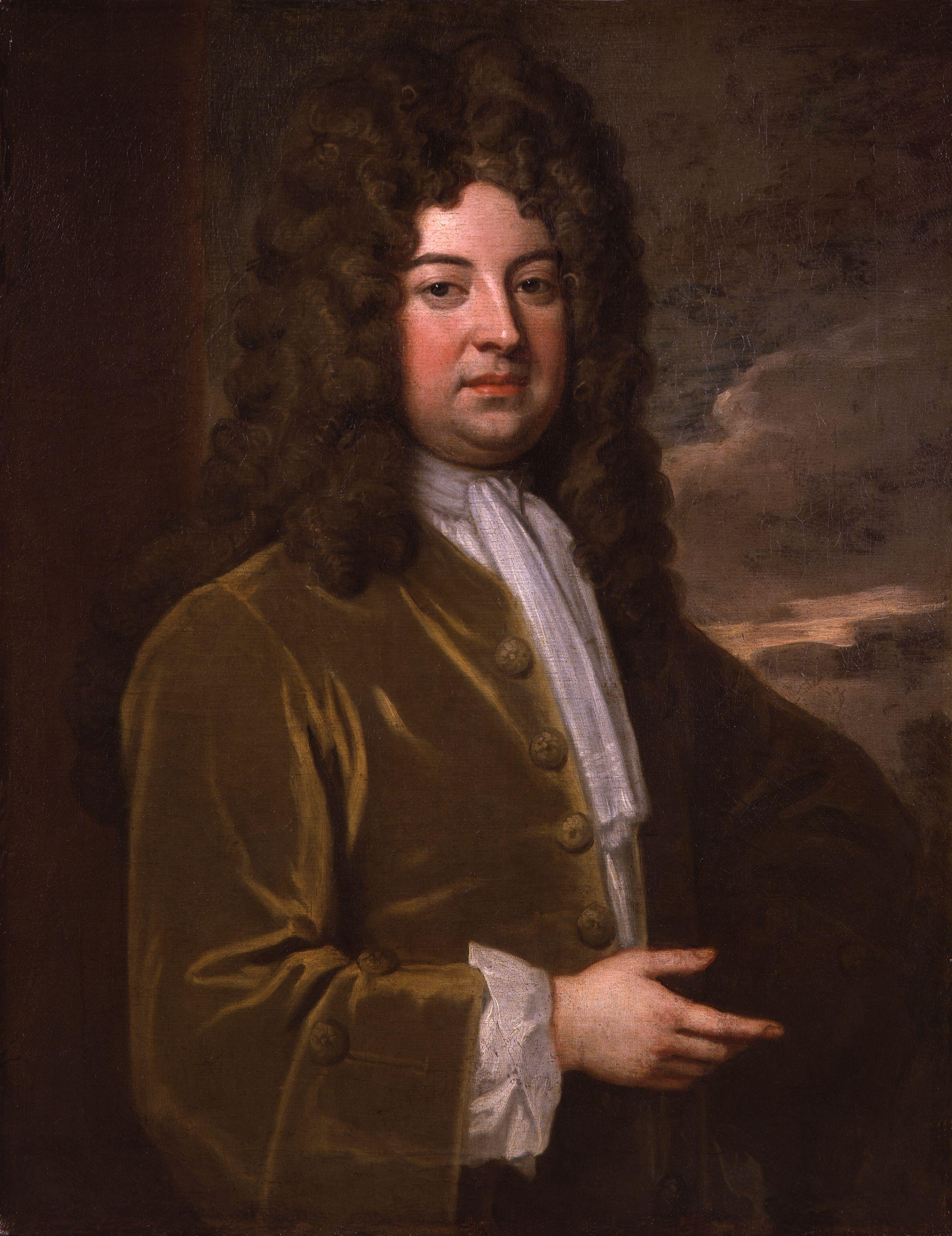
Portrait by Sir Godfrey Kneller, National Portrait Gallery, London

Abraham Stanyan (c. 1669–1732) was a British diplomat and politician who sat in the House of Commons from 1715 to 1717. He was ambassador to Austria and the Ottoman Empire.

Stanyan was the eldest son of Lawrence Stanyan of Monken Hadley, Middlesex and his wife Dorothy Knapp, daughter of Henry Knapp of South Stoke, Oxfordshire. His father was a merchant, farmer and commissioner of the revenue. He was the elder brother of the historian and politician Temple Stanyan.

After becoming a student in the Middle Temple, he served as secretary to Sir William Trumbull as Ambassador to the Ottoman Empire, and later to the Earl of Manchester as Ambassador to the Venice in 1697–1698 and then in France in 1699–1700. He became a Clerk of the Privy Council, briefly between these appointments. After a period out of employment, he was appointed as envoy to Switzerland from 1705 to 1714, after which he published a book in English about the country, An Account of Switzerland.

Following his Swiss adventure, he was appointed Ambassador to Austria from 1716 to 1717, then Ambassador to the Ottoman Empire in October 1717. He arrived at Adrianople on 24 April 1718. He held these last two posts in a period when England held the role of mediator between the Habsburgs and the Ottomans, and having worked in the capitals of both powers Stanyan was an influential part of those negotiations. He was recalled on 16 May 1729 but did not leave Turkey until 18 July 1730.

On his return to England from Switzerland in 1714, Stanyan was appointed a Commissioner of the Admiralty. At the 1715 general election, he was elected as Member of Parliament for Buckingham on the interest of his cousin, Lord Cobham. He gave up his seat in October 1717 on appointment to office as clerk in ordinary to Privy Council. He was a Whig and member of the Kit Kat Club.

Stanyan died in September 1732.

== Works ==
- An Account of Switzerland, London, printed for Jacob Tonson, 1714.

Diplomatic posts
Preceded by William Aglionby	British envoy to Switzerland; 1705–1714	Succeeded by James Dayrolle
Preceded by Luke Schaub	Ambassador to Austria; 1715–1716	Succeeded by Lord Lexinton
Preceded by Edward Wortley Montagu	British Ambassador to the Ottoman Empire; 1718 – 1730	Succeeded by Earl of Kinnoull
Parliament of Great Britain
Preceded by Thomas Chapman; John Radcliffe	Member of Parliament for Buckingham; 1715–1718; With: Alexander Denton	Succeeded by Edmund Halsey; Alexander Denton
