= 1959 South West Norfolk by-election =

UK parliamentary by-election

The 1959 South West Norfolk by-election of 25 March 1959 was held after Labour Member of Parliament (MP) Sidney Dye died on 9 December 1958. The seat was retained by Labour.

== Candidates ==
Labour chose Albert Hilton as their candidate for the by-election. A leading member of the National Union of Agricultural and Allied Workers, Hilton was a longstanding party activist who held the seat until he was defeated in the 1964 general election. He would go on to sit in the House of Lords.

Barrister Elaine Kellett ran for the Conservative Party in one of a number of unsuccessful candidacies for the party. She went on to serve as MP for Lancaster and MEP for North West England.

The third candidate, Andrew Fountaine, ran as an Independent Nationalist, adopting a far right platform immediately before being appointed President of the National Labour Party. He would become a leading figure in the National Front as well as briefly leading his own party, the Constitutional Movement.

== Result ==
South West Norfolk, by-election 1959
Party	Candidate	Votes	%	±%
Labour	Albert Hilton	15,314	50.95	+0.66
Conservative	Elaine Kellett	13,960	46.44	−3.27
Independent Nationalist	Andrew Fountaine	785	2.61	New
Majority		1,354	4.51	+3.93
Turnout		30,059		
Labour hold		Swing		
