= Gillian Shephard =

British politician (born 1940)

The Right Honourable The Baroness Shephard of Northwold PC DL
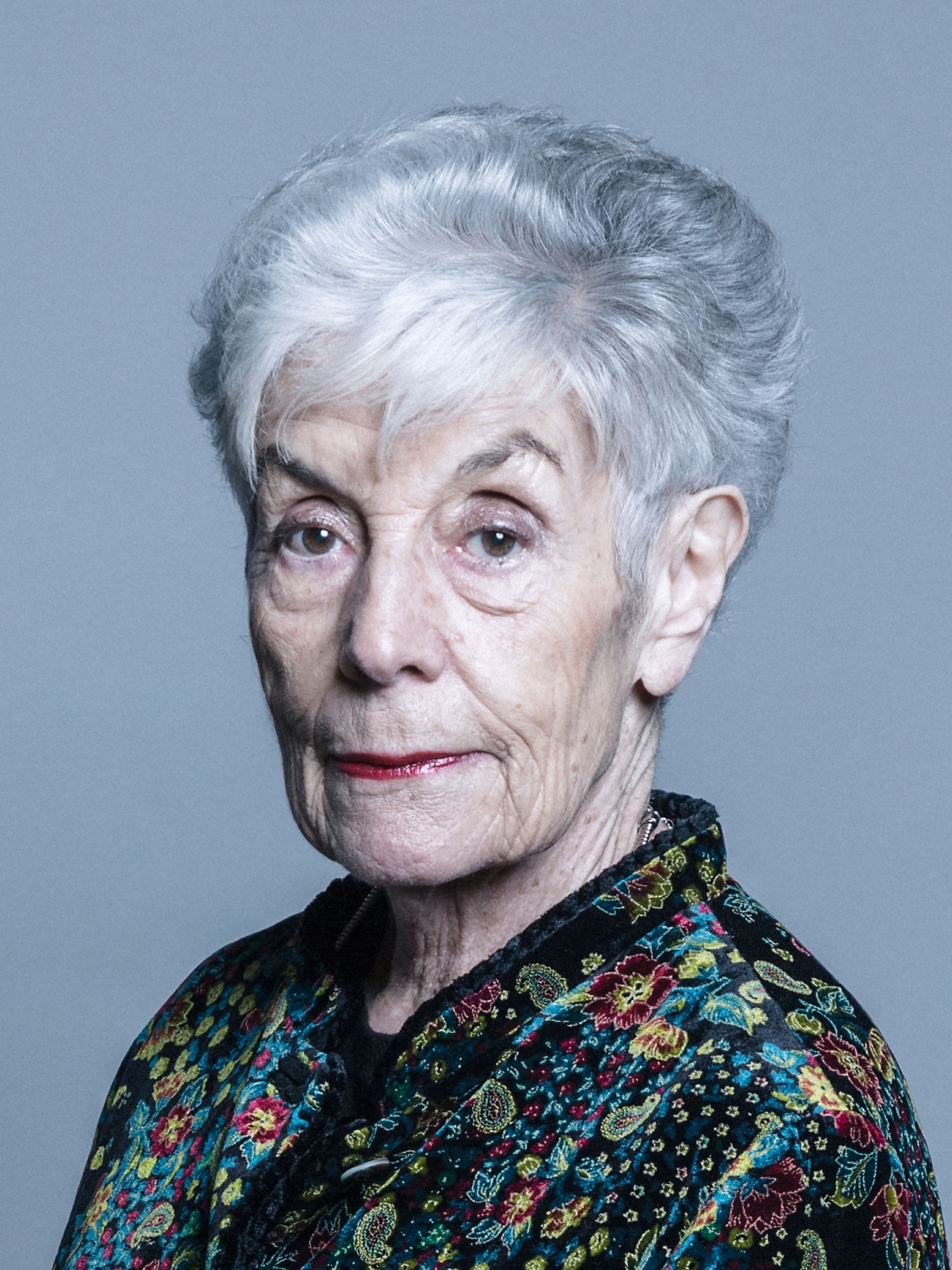
- Official portrait, 2018

Shadow Secretary of State for Environment, Transport and the Regions
- In office 1 June 1998 – 15 June 1999
- Leader: William Hague
- Preceded by: Norman Fowler
- Succeeded by: John Redwood

Shadow Leader of the House of Commons
- In office 11 June 1997 – 1 June 1998
- Leader: William Hague
- Preceded by: Alastair Goodlad
- Succeeded by: George Young

Shadow Chancellor of the Duchy of Lancaster
- In office 11 June 1997 – 1 June 1998
- Leader: William Hague
- Preceded by: Michael Heseltine
- Succeeded by: George Young

Shadow Secretary of State for Education and Employment
- In office 2 May 1997 – 11 June 1997
- Leader: John Major
- Preceded by: David Blunkett
- Succeeded by: Stephen Dorrell

Secretary of State for Education and Employment^{[a]}
- In office 20 July 1994 – 2 May 1997
- Prime Minister: John Major
- Preceded by: John Patten
- Succeeded by: David Blunkett

Minister of Agriculture, Fisheries and Food
- In office 27 May 1993 – 20 July 1994
- Prime Minister: John Major
- Preceded by: John Gummer
- Succeeded by: William Waldegrave

Secretary of State for Employment
- In office 10 April 1992 – 27 May 1993
- Prime Minister: John Major
- Preceded by: Michael Howard
- Succeeded by: David Hunt

Member of the House of Lords
- Lord Temporal
- Life peerage 21 June 2005

Member of Parliament for South West Norfolk
- In office 11 June 1987 – 11 April 2005
- Preceded by: Paul Hawkins
- Succeeded by: Christopher Fraser

Personal details
- Born: Gillian Patricia Watts; 22 January 1940 (age 86) Cromer, England
- Party: Conservative
- Spouse: Thomas Shephard (m. 1975)
- Education: St Hilda's College, Oxford
- Awards: Legion of Honour – (2009)
- a. Shephard served as Education Secretary from 1994 to 1995. In July 1995, Shephard took over the duties of the former role of Secretary of State for Employment, held by Michael Portillo until the role was abolished. Shephard then became Education and Employment Secretary.

Gillian Patricia Shephard, Baroness Shephard of Northwold, PC, DL (née Watts; born 22 January 1940), is a British Conservative politician who was the Member of Parliament (MP) for South West Norfolk from 1987 to 2005. Shephard served as a Cabinet Minister, and is now Chairman of the Association of Conservative Peers.

Shephard is currently the chair of the Alumni Association of Oxford University. She was the chair of the Council of the Institute of Education until 2015 and deputy commissioner of the Social Mobility and Child Poverty Commission until 2017.

== Early life and career ==
The daughter of Reginald and Bertha Watts, she was born in Cromer, Norfolk, and spent her early years in Mundesley on Sea, her father being a haulier with a small garage. She was educated at North Walsham Girls' High School and St Hilda's College, Oxford, where she graduated with an MA in Modern Languages.

She became a schoolteacher and then worked as an Education Inspector for Norfolk County Council from 1963 to 1975. From 1975 to 1977 she worked for Anglia Television. She was elected to Parliament in 1987, and became Parliamentary Private Secretary to Peter Lilley in 1988. She was appointed Parliamentary Under-Secretary of State for the Department of Social Security in 1989, and then in 1990, Minister of State at HM Treasury. In 1990, she was given the additional role of Deputy Chairman of the Party.

== Family ==
She married Thomas Shephard on 27 December 1975. She has two stepsons, including econometrician Neil Shephard FBA, Professor of Economics and Statistics at Harvard University.

== Ministerial career ==
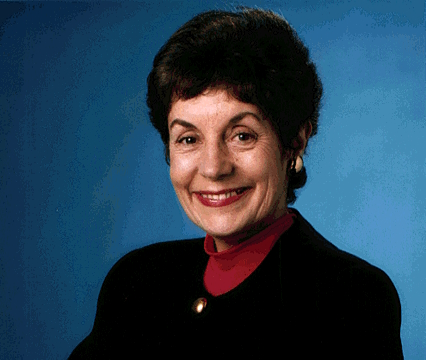
Official portrait, 1995

After the 1992 general election, she was appointed Secretary of State for Employment, then Minister of Agriculture, Fisheries and Food in 1993. She moved to Secretary of State for Education in 1994, and stayed at the department when the Department for Employment merged into it in 1996. She remained in this position until the 1997 general election.

Shephard was one of two women promoted to John Major's Cabinet in 1992; the other was Virginia Bottomley. The two believed the media was looking for stories of Ministerial "catfights" and made a pact to work together, despite differences in backgrounds and working styles. In an interview, Shephard said, "We said that we would never give anybody the chance to say that we were criticising the other. We would be supportive; end of. And we were."

Shephard provided considerable information regarding her role as Secretary of State for Education in interviews conducted by Brian Sherratt in October 1994 and March 1996 for his book on the agenda for educational reform which the Conservative Party had developed since 1979.

== In opposition ==
After the defeat of the Conservatives, William Hague made her Shadow Leader of the House of Commons and later Shadow Secretary of State for the Environment, Transport and the Regions. She returned to the backbenches in 1999 and stepped down from the House of Commons at the 2005 general election. Her memoirs Shephard's Watch: Illusions of Power in British Politics were published in 2000.

In 2013 following the death of Margaret Thatcher, Shephard published a memoir, The Real Iron Lady, of her time working with the former prime minister.

== Life peerage ==
On 13 May 2005 it was announced that she would be created a life peer, and on 21 June 2005 the peerage was created as Baroness Shephard of Northwold, of Northwold in the County of Norfolk.

She is currently Chairman of the Association of Conservative Peers. She was Deputy Chair of the Social Mobility and Child Poverty Commission until 2017, when she resigned in frustration with Prime Minister Theresa May's lack of action.

== Arms ==
Coat of arms of Gillian Shephard
Adopted 2006 Coronet Coronet of a Baroness Escutcheon Quarterly Azure and Or three pairs of ears of barley in pale each pair fesswise leaved and with slips inwards and conjoined all counterchanged. Supporters On either side a hare Azure gorged with a coronet attached thereto a chain reflexed over the back Or. Motto SERVO ERGO SUM Badge A hare's face Azure in the mouth a pair of ears of wheat fesswise leaved with slips inwards and conjoined Or. Symbolism These Armorial Bearings reflect rural Norfolk with blue for the Conservative party.

== Honours ==
- She was appointed as a member of the Privy Council of the United Kingdom in 1992, giving her the Honorific Title "The Right Honourable" and after Ennoblement the Post Nominal Letters "PC" for life.
- She was appointed as a Deputy Lieutenant for the County of Norfolk on 23 July 2003, giving her the post nominal letters "DL" for life. on 22 January 2015 She was moved to the Retired List upon reaching the Mandatory retirement age of 75.
- On 21 June 2005 she was awarded a Life Peerage. The peerage was created as Baroness Shephard of Northwold, of Northwold in the County of Norfolk. This entitled her to a seat in the House of Lords where she sits with the Conservative Party Benches.
- In 2009 she was awarded the Legion of Honour by France.
- She holds Honorary Fellowships from St Hilda's College, Oxford, Queen Mary University of London (2008), and the Royal Veterinary College.
- In July 2018 she was awarded the Honorary degree of Doctor of Civil Law (DCL) from the University of East Anglia.

Parliament of the United Kingdom
Preceded by Paul Hawkins	Member of Parliament for South West Norfolk; 1987–2005	Succeeded by Christopher Fraser
Political offices
Preceded by Michael Howard	Secretary of State for Employment; 1992–1993	Succeeded by David Hunt
Preceded by John Gummer	Minister of State for Agriculture, Fisheries and Food; 1993–1994	Succeeded by William Waldegrave
Preceded by John Patten	Secretary of State for Education; 1994–1995	Succeeded by Herself as Secretary of State for Education and Employment
Preceded by Herself as Secretary of State for Education	Secretary of State for Education and Employment; 1995–1997	Succeeded by David Blunkett
Succeeded by Michael Portillo as Secretary of State for Employment	Secretary of State for Education and Employment; 1995–1997	Succeeded by David Blunkett
Preceded by David Blunkett	Shadow Secretary of State for Education and Employment; 1997	Succeeded by Stephen Dorrell
Preceded by Alastair Goodlad	Shadow Leader of the House of Commons; 1997–1998	Succeeded by George Young
Preceded by Michael Heseltine	Shadow Chancellor of the Duchy of Lancaster; 1997–1998	Succeeded by George Young
Preceded by Norman Fowler	Shadow Secretary of State for the Environment, Transport and the Regions; 1998–1999	Succeeded by John Redwood
