= Mid Dorset and North Poole =

UK Parliament constituency (since 1997)

Coordinates: 50.7004°N 2.0693°W

- County constituency for the House of Commons
- Interactive map of boundaries since 2024
- Boundary of Mid Dorset and North Poole in South West England
- County: Dorset
- Electorate: 74,305 (2023)
- Major settlements: Merley, Broadstone, Corfe Mullen, Bere Regis, Wareham, and Wimborne Minster

Current constituency
- Created: 1997
- Member of Parliament: Vikki Slade (Liberal Democrats)
- Seats: One

Mid Dorset and North Poole is a constituency (Note: A county constituency (for the purposes of election expenses and type of returning officer)) represented in the House of Commons of the UK Parliament since 2024 by Vikki Slade, a Liberal Democrat. (Note: As with all constituencies, the constituency elects one Member of Parliament (MP) by the first past the post system of election at least every five years.)

== Constituency profile ==
Mid Dorset and North Poole is a constituency in Dorset. It covers some northern suburbs of the large towns of Poole and Bournemouth and the rural areas to their north and west. Settlements in the constituency include the suburbs of Canford Heath, Broadstone and Bearwood, the towns of Wimborne Minster, Corfe Mullen, Upton and Wareham and the villages of Lytchett Matravers and Merley.

Poole and Bournemouth are popular seaside resort towns. The suburbs and nearby settlements of Corfe Mullen and Merley were mostly developed during the late 20th century as residential estates. Wimborne Minster and Wareham are historic market towns. The constituency is generally affluent with low levels of deprivation, especially so in Broadstone, Corfe Mullen and Merley which fall within the top 10% least-deprived areas in England. The average house price in the constituency is higher than the national and South West England averages.

Residents of Mid Dorset and North Poole are generally older with a large retiree population. They have high rates of household income and the child poverty rate is low. Residents have average levels of education and are likely to be homeowners. A high proportion work in the manufacturing and construction industries and the percentage of residents claiming unemployment benefits is low. White people made up 97% of the population at the 2021 census.

At the local council level, all of the constituency's wards are represented by Liberal Democrat councillors. An estimated 56% of voters in the constituency supported leaving the European Union in the 2016 referendum, higher than the nationwide figure of 52%.

== Boundaries ==
Map of 2010–2024 boundaries

1997–2010:

- The District of Purbeck wards of Bere Regis, Lytchett Matravers, Lytchett Minster, St Martin, and Wareham;
- The District of East Dorset wards of Corfe Mullen Central, Corfe Mullen North, and Corfe Mullen South; and
- The Borough of Poole wards of Alderney, Broadstone, Canford Heath, Canford Magna, and Creekmoor.

The constituency was created in 1997 from parts of the seats of North Dorset (Corfe Mullen Central, Corfe Mullen North, Corfe Mullen South, Lytchett Matravers, and Lytchett Minster wards), Poole (Broadstone, Canford Heath, Canford Magna, and Creekmoor wards), South Dorset (Bere Regis, St Martin, and Wareham wards), and Bournemouth West (Alderney ward).

2010–2024:

- The District of Purbeck wards of Bere Regis, Lytchett Matravers, Lytchett Minster and Upton East, Lytchett Minster and Upton West, St Martin, and Wareham;
- The District of East Dorset wards of Colehill East, Colehill West, Corfe Mullen Central, Corfe Mullen North, Corfe Mullen South, and Wimborne Minster; and
- The Borough of Poole wards of Broadstone, Canford Heath East, Canford Heath West, and Merley and Bearwood.

In 2010, Colehill and Wimborne Minster were added to the seat from North Dorset, Alderney was moved back to Bournemouth West, and Creekmoor back to Poole.

2024–present:

- The District of Bournemouth, Christchurch and Poole wards of: Bearwood & Merley; Broadstone; Canford Heath.
- The District of Dorset wards of: Colehill & Wimborne Minster East; Corfe Mullen; Lytchett Matravers & Upton; Stour & Allen Vale; Wareham; West Purbeck (polling districts WPU2 and WPU3); Wimborne Minster.

Boundaries expanded following re-organisation of local authorities and wards in Dorset, bringing the electorate within the permitted range.

== Members of Parliament ==
Election	Member	Party
1997	Christopher Fraser	Conservative
2001	Annette Brooke	Liberal Democrat
2015	Michael Tomlinson	Conservative
2024	Vikki Slade	Liberal Democrat

== Elections ==
=== Elections in the 2020s ===
General election 2024: Mid Dorset and North Poole
Party	Candidate	Votes	%	±%
Liberal Democrats	Vikki Slade	21,442	43.3	+13.4
Conservative	Michael Tomlinson	20,090	40.6	−19.4
Labour	Candice Johnson-Cole	4,566	9.2	+1.9
Green	Ben Pantling	2,355	4.8	+1.9
SDP	John Dowling	1,061	2.1	N/A
Majority		1,352	2.7	N/A
Turnout		49,514	65.8	–8.1
Registered electors		75,294		
Liberal Democrats gain from Conservative		Swing	+16.4	

=== Elections in the 2010s ===
2019 notional result
Party	Vote	%
Conservative	32,965	60.0
Liberal Democrats	16,395	29.9
Labour	3,982	7.3
Green	1,565	2.9
Turnout	54,907	73.9
Electorate	74,305	

General election 2019: Mid Dorset and North Poole
Party	Candidate	Votes	%	±%
Conservative	Michael Tomlinson	29,548	60.4	+1.2
Liberal Democrats	Vikki Slade	14,650	29.9	+2.4
Labour	Joanne Oldale	3,402	7.0	−6.3
Green	Natalie Carswell	1,330	2.7	New
Majority		14,898	30.5	−1.2
Turnout		48,930	74.8	+0.6
Conservative hold		Swing	+0.7	

General election 2017: Mid Dorset and North Poole
Party	Candidate	Votes	%	±%
Conservative	Michael Tomlinson	28,585	59.2	+8.4
Liberal Democrats	Vikki Slade	13,246	27.5	−0.7
Labour	Steve Brew	6,423	13.3	+7.3
Majority		15,339	31.7	+9.1
Turnout		48,254	74.2	+1.7
Conservative hold		Swing	+4.5	

General election 2015: Mid Dorset and North Poole
Party	Candidate	Votes	%	±%
Conservative	Michael Tomlinson	23,639	50.8	+6.3
Liberal Democrats	Vikki Slade	13,109	28.2	−16.9
UKIP	Richard Turner	5,663	12.2	+7.7
Labour	Patrick Canavan	2,767	6.0	+0.1
Green	Mark Chivers	1,321	2.8	New
Majority		10,530	22.6	N/A
Turnout		46,499	72.5	+8.1
Conservative gain from Liberal Democrats		Swing	+11.6	

General election 2010: Mid Dorset and North Poole
Party	Candidate	Votes	%	±%
Liberal Democrats	Annette Brooke	21,100	45.1	−4.9
Conservative	Nick King	20,831	44.5	+7.7
Labour	Darren Brown	2,748	5.9	−4.2
UKIP	Dave Evans	2,109	4.5	+1.4
Majority		269	0.6	−11.5
Turnout		46,788	64.4	−4.1
Liberal Democrats hold		Swing	−6.3	

=== Elections in the 2000s ===
General election 2005: Mid Dorset and North Poole
Party	Candidate	Votes	%	±%
Liberal Democrats	Annette Brooke	22,000	48.7	+6.7
Conservative	Simon Hayes	16,518	36.6	−4.5
Labour	Philip Murray	5,221	11.6	−3.9
UKIP	Avril King	1,420	3.1	+1.7
Majority		5,482	12.1	+11.2
Turnout		45,159	68.5	+2.9
Liberal Democrats hold		Swing	+5.6	

General election 2001: Mid Dorset and North Poole
Party	Candidate	Votes	%	±%
Liberal Democrats	Annette Brooke	18,358	42.0	+2.7
Conservative	Christopher Fraser	17,974	41.1	+0.4
Labour	James Selby-Bennett	6,765	15.5	−0.3
UKIP	Jeff Mager	621	1.4	New
Majority		384	0.9	N/A
Turnout		43,718	65.6	−9.9
Liberal Democrats gain from Conservative		Swing	+1.15	

=== Elections in the 1990s ===
General election 1997: Mid Dorset and North Poole
Party	Candidate	Votes	%	±%
Conservative	Christopher Fraser	20,632	40.7	
Liberal Democrats	Alan Leaman	19,951	39.3	
Labour	David Collis	8,014	15.8	
Referendum	David Nabarro	2,136	4.2	
Majority		681	1.4	
Turnout		50,733	75.7	
Conservative win (new seat)				

== See also ==
- Parliamentary constituencies in Dorset
