= Charles Hardy =

Royal Navy officer, politician and colonial administrator (1714–1780)

Admiral Sir Charles Hardy
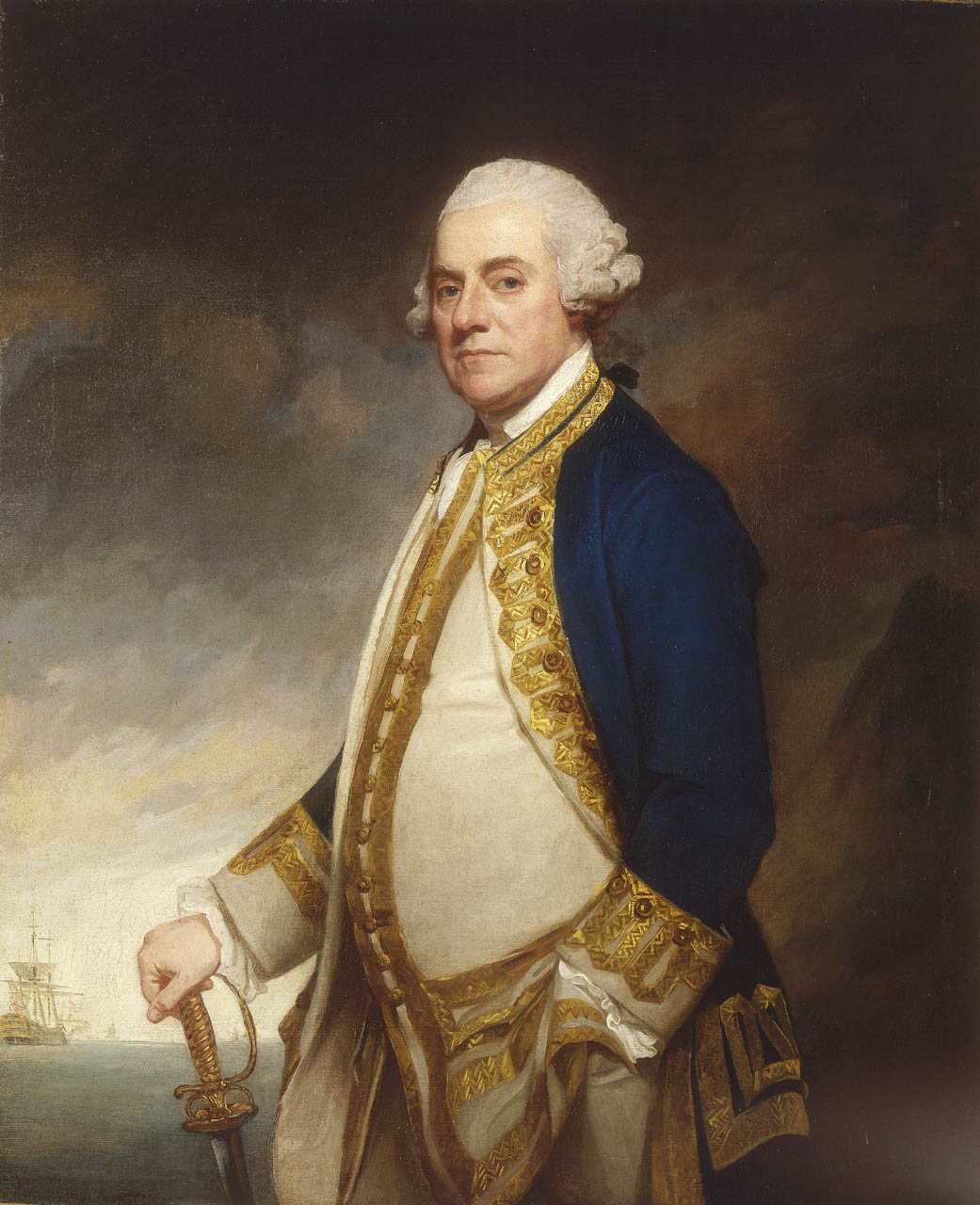
- Portrait by George Romney, 1780
- Military career
- Allegiance: Great Britain
- Branch: Royal Navy
- Service years: 1731–1780
- Rank: Admiral of the White
- Commands: HMS Rye; HMS Jersey; Newfoundland Station; HMS Torrington; Governor of New York; Greenwich Hospital, London; Channel Fleet

Governor of the Province of New York
- In office January 1755 – 1758
- Appointed by: George II
- Preceded by: James De Lancey (acting)
- Succeeded by: James De Lancey (acting)

Member of Parliament
- In office 1771–1780
- Constituency: Plymouth
- In office 1764–1768
- Constituency: Rochester

Personal details
- Born: c. 1714 Portsmouth, Hampshire
- Died: 18 May 1780

Viceregal styles of Sir Charles Hardy
- Reference style: His Excellency
- Spoken style: Your Excellency

Admiral Sir Charles Hardy (c. 1714 – 18 May 1780) was a Royal Navy officer, politician and colonial administrator who sat in the House of Commons of Great Britain between 1764 and 1780. He served as governor of New York from 1755 to 1757.

== Early career ==
Born at Portsmouth, Hampshire, the son of Vice-Admiral Sir Charles Hardy, Charles Hardy joined the Royal Navy as a volunteer in 1731.

He became a captain in the Royal Navy on 10 August 1741, around the age of 27. His first command was the 24-gun HMS Rye, stationed off the British Carolinas from January 1742 to February 1744. In 1744 he was appointed governor and commander-in-chief of the British colony of Newfoundland, though there is no record of his visiting it during his term in office. In 1745 he took command of HMS Torrington, assisting in the protection of a convoy which brought reinforcements from Gibraltar to the newly captured fortress of Louisbourg.

He was knighted in 1755 and served as governor of the Colony of New York from 1755 to 1757 (replaced by James Delancey). During his term he was made Rear-Admiral of the Blue.

== Seven Years' War ==
In 1757, under the command of Vice Admiral Francis Holburne, Hardy escorted Lord Loudoun and his army from New York to Halifax intending to attack Louisbourg, but the attack was called off when Louisbourg was found to be strongly defended by a French fleet. The next year, he was second in command under Admiral Edward Boscawen at the successful Siege of Louisbourg.

That autumn, he and James Wolfe attacked French posts around the mouth of the St. Lawrence River and destroyed all of the French fishing stations along the northern shores of what is now New Brunswick and along the Gaspé Peninsula. He also participated in Hawke's victory at the Battle of Quiberon Bay in 1759.

Hardy served as the governor of Greenwich Hospital from 1771 to 1780. In 1778, he was made Admiral of the White. In 1779 he became Commander-in-Chief of the Channel Fleet, remaining in that post until his death due to an apoplectic fit in May 1780.

== Member of Parliament ==
Hardy sat as Member of Parliament for Rochester from 1764 to 1768 and for Plymouth from 1771 to 1780.

== Personal life ==
In 1749 Hardy married Mary Tate, who died the next year without issue and left him her home, Delapré Abbey and its estate; he sold it in 1764 to Edward Bouverie for £22,000. Following his first wife's death, he married Catharine Stanyan, the daughter of Temple Stanyan. Through Catherine, he inherited Temple Stanyan's estate at Rawlins, Oxfordshire.

The couple had three sons and two daughters. Sir Charles Hardy died at Spithead. He bequeathed £3000 to each of the sons and £4000 to each daughter, as well as leaving his estate to his eldest son Temple Hardy. By Catharine's death in 1801, only Temple survived of the three sons. Hardy's brother Josiah was a merchant and the Governor of New Jersey from 1761 to 1763.

== See also ==
- Governors of Newfoundland
- List of people of Newfoundland and Labrador

Government offices
Preceded by Thomas Smith	Commodore Governor of Newfoundland; 1744–1744	Succeeded by Richard Edwards
Preceded by James DeLancey (acting)	Governor of the Province of New York; 1755–1758	Succeeded by James DeLancey (acting)
Military offices
Preceded by Sir Francis Holburne	Governor, Greenwich Hospital; 1771–1780	Succeeded by Sir Hugh Palliser
