= Alan McLean (MP) =

British politician (1875–1959)

Sir Alan McLean MBE (5 July 1875 – 9 May 1959) was a British Member of Parliament.

McLean was educated at Harrow School and Trinity College, Cambridge. He became a barrister at Lincoln's Inn. He was also chair of the Lamson Paragon Supply Company, and served on the council of the National Rifle Association. During World War I, he served in France.

McLean stood for the Conservative Party in Caerphilly at the 1922 general election, but was not elected. He then stood in South West Norfolk in 1923, winning the seat. He held the seat until 1929, when he was defeated, but won the seat back at the 1931 general election, standing down in 1935.

McLean retired to Alford, Aberdeenshire, where he was elected to Aberdeenshire County Council, serving as its convenor from 1950 until 1955. He was also a deputy lieutenant for Aberdeenshire.

McLean was knighted in 1933, and was also made a Member of the Order of the British Empire.
