= Bridgeman =

Bridgeman is an English surname. Notable people with the name include:

== A ==
- Angela Bridgeman (born 1963/4), Scottish athlete

== B ==
- Bill Bridgeman (1916–1968), American test pilot
- Billy Bridgeman (1882–1947), English footballer

== C ==
- Caroline Bridgeman, Viscountess Bridgeman (1873–1961), English political activist and churchwoman
- Charles Bridgeman (1690–1738), English garden designer
- Charles Bridgeman (cricketer) (1852–1933), English barrister and cricketer, son of |George Thomas Orlando Bridgeman
- Charles Bridgeman (priest) (died 1678), English priest
- Charles Orlando Bridgeman (1791–1860), British Royal Navy officer

== D ==
- Lady Diana Bridgeman (1907–1967), English socialite and fashion leader, daughter of Orlando Bridgeman, 5th Earl of Bradford

== E ==
- Edward Bridgeman (fl.1563), Sheriff of Exeter, England
- Edward Bridgeman (MP) (after 1588 – 1646), English politician

== F ==
- Francis Bridgeman (British Army officer) (1846–1917), British army officer and politician
- Francis Bridgeman (Royal Navy officer) (1848–1929), Royal Navy Admiral

== G ==
- Geoffrey Bridgeman (1898–1974), British soldier and ophthalmologist
- George Bridgman (1864–1943), Canadian-American painter, writer and teacher
- George Thomas Orlando Bridgeman (1823–95), British Anglican priest and antiquarian, son of George Bridgeman, 2nd Earl of Bradford
- George Bridgeman, 2nd Earl of Bradford (1789–1865), British peer
- George Bridgeman, 4th Earl of Bradford (1845–1915), British soldier and peer
- Gerald Bridgeman, 6th Earl of Bradford (1911–1981), British peer and soldier

== H ==
- Harriet Bridgeman (born 1942), British art historian
- Harry A. Bridgeman (1877–1955), American politician
- Henry Bridgeman (British Army officer) (1882–1972), British soldier
- Henry Bridgeman (bishop) (1615–1682), English Anglican bishop of Sodor and Man, son of John Bridgeman the bishop
- Henry Simpson Bridgeman (1757–1782), British politician
- Henry Bridgeman, 1st Baron Bradford (1725–1800), British politician and peer
- Hewitt Bridgeman (died 1853), Irish Radical politician

== I ==
- Ida Bridgeman, Countess of Bradford (1848–1936), British noblewoman

== J ==
- Jacob Bridgeman (born 1999), American golfer
- John Bridgeman (died 1523) (by 1489 – 1523), English politician
- John Bridgeman (died 1729) (c.1655–1729), English politician
- John Bridgeman (American politician), American real estate executive and politician
- John Bridgeman (bishop) (1577–1652), English Anglican bishop
- John Bridgeman (judge) (1568/9–1638), English barrister and Chief Justice of Chester
- John Bridgeman (sculptor) (1916–2004), English sculptor
- Junior Bridgeman (1953–2025), American basketball player and businessman

== L ==
- Lewis Bridgeman (born 2007), English actor

== M ==
- Mary Francis Bridgeman (1813–1888), Irish Catholic nun and nursing pioneer
- Maurice Bridgeman (1904–1980), British businessman and civil servant

== N ==
- Noel Bridgeman (1946–2021), Irish drummer

== O ==
- Orlando Bridgeman, 1st Earl of Bradford (1762–1825), British peer and politician
- Orlando Bridgeman, 3rd Earl of Bradford (1819–1898), British courtier and politician
- Orlando Bridgeman, 5th Earl of Bradford (1873–1957), British peer, politician and soldier
- Sir Orlando Bridgeman, 1st Baronet, of Great Lever (1606–1674), English lawyer and politician
- Sir Orlando Bridgeman, 1st Baronet, of Ridley (1649–1701), English baronet and politician
- Sir Orlando Bridgeman, 2nd Baronet (1678–1746), British landowner and politician
- Sir Orlando Bridgeman, 4th Baronet (1695–1764), British politician
- Orlando Bridgeman (Ipswich MP) (1680–1731), English politician
- Orlando Bridgeman (RAF officer) (1898–1931), British World War I flying ace

== P ==
- Peter Bridgeman (1933–2013), British Army officer
- Percy Williams Bridgman (1882–1961), American physicist

== R ==
- Reginald Bridgeman (1884–1968), British diplomat and politician
- Richard Bridgeman, 7th Earl of Bradford (born 1947), British peer
- Robert Bridgeman, 2nd Viscount Bridgeman (1896–1982), British Army officer and peer
- Robin Bridgeman, 3rd Viscount Bridgeman (1930–2026), British politician and peer

== S ==
- Selina Bridgeman (1819–1894), British correspondent of Benjamin Disraeli, wife of Orlando Bridgeman, 3rd Earl of Bradford

== T ==
- Tessa Bridgeman (1937–2019), British charity executive

== W ==
- William Bridgeman (Bramber MP) (c.1646–1699), English civil servant and politician
- William Bridgeman, 1st Viscount Bridgeman (1864–1935), British politician and peer

== See also ==
- Bridgman, surname
