= Harriet Bridgeman =

British art historian (born 1942)

The Right Honourable The Viscountess Bridgeman CBE FRSA
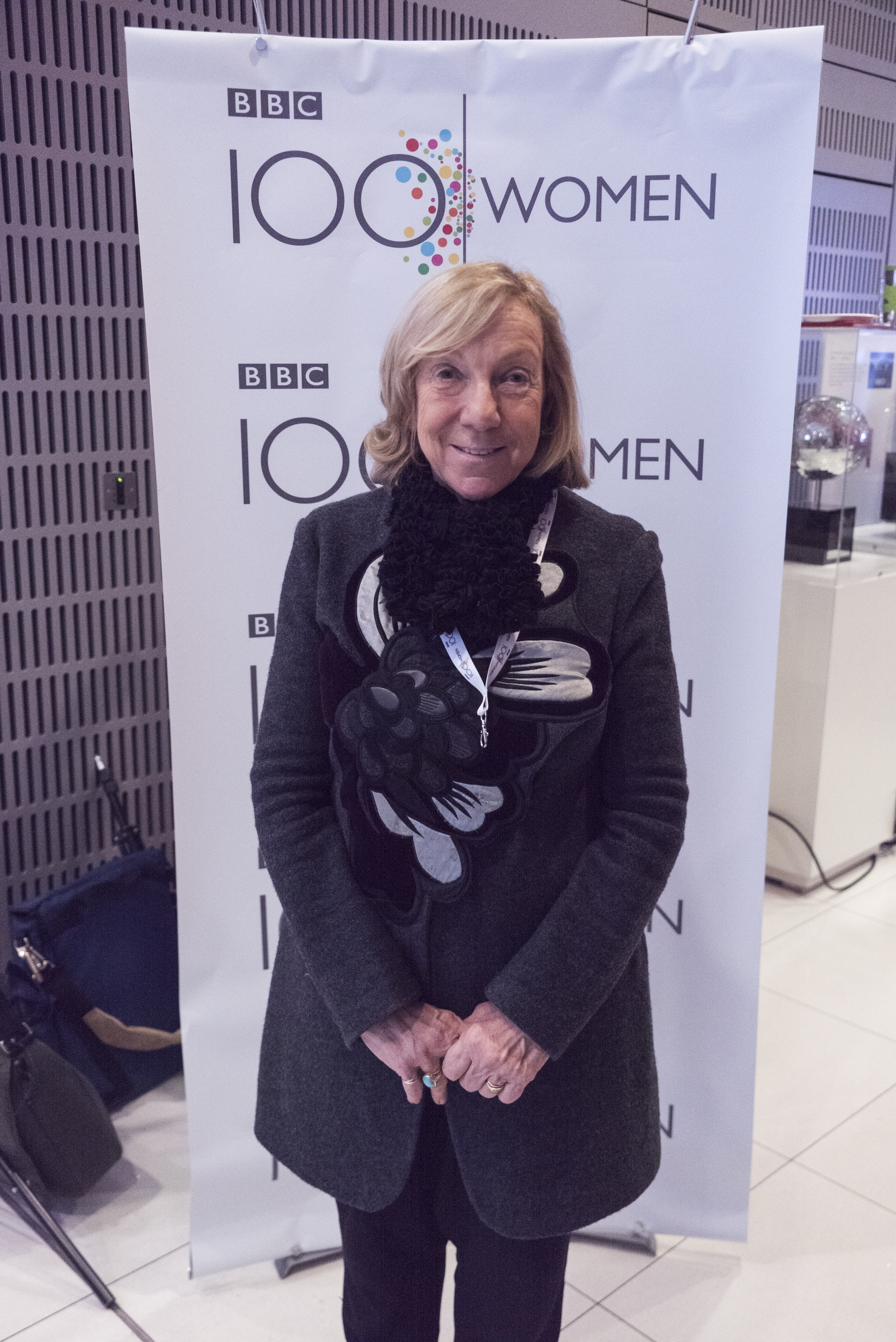
- Bridgeman at the BBC's 100 Women Wikipedia editathon in 2016
- Born: Victoria Harriet Lucy Turton; 1942 (age 83–84); County Durham, England

Victoria Harriet Lucy Bridgeman, Viscountess Bridgeman (née Turton; born 1942), is the founder of the Bridgeman Art Library, a for-profit company that provides a large collection of fine art images and the Artists' Collecting Society, a not-for-profit Community Interest Company dedicated to the collection of the Artists' Resale Right (Droit de Suite) and copyright on behalf of artists and artists' estates in both the UK and the EEA.

== Early life and education ==
Born to Ralph Meredyth Turton and Mary Blanche Chetwynd-Stapylton in County Durham, England, she is one of four daughters. Throughout her early youth, she was educated at home by a governess, under the Parents' National Educational Union System. She then attended St Mary's School in Wantage, Berkshire, and Trinity College Dublin, graduating with a Master of Arts degree.

After graduating in 1964, she worked as an editorial trainee with The Lady magazine. Continuing with her passion for writing, in 1965, she was appointed Executive Editor for a weekly monograph called The Masters. Following this, she conceived, edited and produced another weekly magazine, Discovering Antiques, for which she formed her own production company, Harriet Bridgeman Ltd. The many books written and edited by her include The Encyclopaedia of Victoriana and The British Eccentric, both co-authored with Elizabeth Drury.

== Family ==
In 1966, she married Robin Bridgeman, the son of Brigadier Geoffrey Bridgeman and his wife Mary Meriel Gertrude (née Talbot), producing a family of four sons. In 1983, her husband succeeded his uncle Robert Bridgeman, 2nd Viscount Bridgeman, in the Bridgeman viscountcy, and became a member of the House of Lords. After her husband's death in April 2026, the viscountcy is held by their eldest surviving son Luke.

== Bridgeman Library ==
During her time as an editor and author, Bridgeman discovered the need for easier access to illustrations of works of art. There was no central and convenient way to obtain colour transparencies or black-and-white prints other than by going from museum to museum. The concept of the Bridgeman Art Library emerged in 1972 and developed to allow users to access thousands of images at the same time providing extra income for the museums, collections, artists and institutions which it represents. The library now has offices in Germany, France, Italy, England, and the United States, and Lady Bridgeman continues to travel internationally in order to support the development of collections and the access to arts generally.

In addition to running the Library, Bridgeman was a founder member of BAPLA British Association of Picture Libraries and Agencies and has chaired their executive committee with special responsibility for copyright. She compiled their first publication on the standardisation of terms in use in the picture industry. She also represents The Artists' Collecting Society CIC on the British Copyright Council (BCC), was a Trustee of the British Sporting Art Trust and the Imperial College Healthcare Charity, and is a member of the Intellectual Property Advisory Committee (IPAC) and a Director of the International Catalogue Raisonné Association] (ICRA). She also sits on the council of the Artists' General Benevolence Institution] and is a patron of Prisoners Abroad.

== Awards ==
CBE ribbon

In 1997, Bridgeman was awarded the European Women of Achievement Award in the Arts. The award was given in recognition of the Bridgeman Art Library's promotion of European culture and the European scope of its clients, collections and research. In 2005, she was voted the International Business Woman of the Year by the judges of the International Business Awards. She has been given funding for three research projects within the arts by the European Union. In 2006, she founded a Community Interest Company, the Artists' Collecting Society to collect Artists' Resale Right (Droit de Suite) on behalf of UK and EEA artists which includes, amongst its many members, Frank Auerbach and Flora Yukhnovich and the estates of Lucian Freud, Barbara Hepworth, and Paula Rego.

Lady Bridgeman was appointed Commander of the Order of the British Empire (CBE) in the 2014 New Year Honours for her "services to art".
