= Artists' Collecting Society =

Artists' Collecting Society (ACS)
- Established: 2006
- Location: London
- Type: Copyright collective
- Website: Artists' Collecting Society Website

Artists' Collecting Society (ACS) is a not-for-profit Community Interest Company dedicated to the collection and distribution of Droit de Suite or Artist's Resale Right (ARR) Royalties.

== About ACS ==
ACS manages copyright and administers the collection and distribution of ARR throughout the UK and EEA on behalf of its member artists.

The Artists' Collecting Society was established in June 2006 by Harriet Bridgeman, CEO and founder of the Bridgeman Art Library, at the request of the Society of London Art Dealers (SLAD) and the British Art Market Federation (BAMF).

By providing artists with a choice of collecting society, ACS ensures the rate of commission charged on the collection of ARR remains competitive.

Formed as a Community Interest Company, ACS operates solely for the benefit of their member artists. Any surplus income is used to benefit member artists and to support various art prizes and bursaries (for details of these please contact the office).

ACS represents over 1,500 artists and artists' estates including well-known artists such as Lucian Freud, Laura Knight, Frank Auerbach, Flora Yukhnovich, Cecily Brown, Paula Rego and Maggi Hambling.

== Background of ARR ==
Artist's Resale Right was introduced in the UK in February 2006 under Directive (European Union) 2001/84. It entitles artists and their beneficiaries to a royalty from the commercial resale of an original work of art when the sale price reaches or exceeds the sterling equivalent of €1,000. ARR lasts for the lifetime of the creator and for 70 years after the creator's death. The royalty is calculated on a sliding scale beginning at 4 per cent of the hammer price for the first €50,000.
