= Mary Bayliss =

English magistrate (1940-2019)

The Honourable Mary Bayliss
- Born: Mary Selina Bayliss; 14 January 1940; Bramham Park, West Yorkshire, England
- Died: 30 March 2019 (aged 79)
- Office: Lord Lieutenant of Berkshire, High Sheriff of Berkshire, Magistrate
- Father: Robert Bridgeman
- Awards: CVO

Mary Selina Bayliss CVO (14 January 1940 – 30 March 2019) was an English magistrate for 32 years, the High Sheriff of Berkshire from 2005 to 2006, and the Lord Lieutenant of Berkshire from 2008 to 2015.

Bayliss was the daughter of Robert Bridgeman, the second Viscount Bridgeman, and his wife, Mary Lane Fox. She was born on 14 January 1940 at Bramham Park in West Yorkshire, which was the home of her mother's family. She was brought up at her parents' home at Minsterley in the county of Shropshire. She married Jeremy Bayliss, a chartered surveyor, in 1962. The couple moved to Sheepbridge Court at Swallowfield in the county of Berkshire, and had three sons.

In 1978, she was appointed as a magistrate in Reading, the county town of Berkshire. She was appointed High Sheriff of Berkshire in 2005, Deputy Lord Lieutenant of Berkshire in 2007, and Lord Lieutenant in 2008, acting as the Queen's official representative in the county. She retired as Lord Lieutenant in 2015. Following her retirement, she was appointed a Commander of the Royal Victorian Order (CVO), and was admitted to the Order of St Frideswide.

She was involved in various charities in Reading and Berkshire, and was patron of the homeless charity Launchpad and the community support charity Connecting Communities in Berkshire.

Honorary titles
Preceded by Anthony West	High Sheriff of Berkshire; 2005–2006	Succeeded by John Hugh Miller
Preceded by Sir Philip Wroughton	Lord Lieutenant of Berkshire; 2008–2015	Succeeded by James Puxley
