= Caroline Bridgeman, Viscountess Bridgeman =

English political activist and churchwoman (1873–1961)

Caroline Beatrix Bridgeman, Viscountess Bridgeman, DBE, JP (née Parker; 30 June 1873 – 26 December 1961), was an English aristocrat, political activist, and churchwoman.

== Life ==
She was born to the Hon. Cecil Thomas Parker (son of the 6th Earl of Macclesfield) and Rosamond Esther Harriet Longley, daughter of Archbishop of Canterbury Charles Longley. She married the Rt Hon. William Bridgeman (grandson of the 2nd Earl of Bradford), on 30 April 1895 in Eccleston, Chester, England. He would later be created Viscount Bridgeman.

She was involved in politics, working with the Tariff Reform League Women's Association and becoming the first chairwoman of the National Union of Conservative and Unionist Organisations.

She was appointed a Dame Commander of the Order of the British Empire (DBE) in 1924, after which she was also known as Dame Caroline Bridgeman. When her husband was created Viscount Bridgeman on 18 June 1929, she was styled as Viscountess Bridgeman.

Bridgeman held the office Justice of Peace (JP) and was a governor of the BBC between 1935 and 1939. She was also vice-chairman of the House of Laity, Church Assembly.

She died on 26 December 1961, aged 88.

== Family ==
Her family includes the following;

=== Children ===
- Sir Robert Clive Bridgeman, 2nd Viscount Bridgeman (1 April 1896 – 17 November 1982)
- Brigadier Hon. Geoffrey John Orlando Bridgeman (3 July 1898 – 15 October 1974)
- Anne Bridgeman (23 July 1900 – 24 July 1900)
- Hon. Sir Maurice Richard Bridgeman (26 January 1904 – 18 June 1980)

=== Grandchildren ===
- Robin Bridgeman, 3rd Viscount Bridgeman (Member of the House of Lords in 2024)

=== Great-grandchildren ===
- Flora Montgomery (actress)

== Arms ==
Coat of arms of Caroline Bridgeman, Viscountess Bridgeman
Escutcheon William Bridgeman, 1st Viscount Bridgeman (Sable ten plates four three two and one on a chief Argent a lion passant Ermines) impaling Cecil Parker, second son of Thomas Parker, 6th Earl of Macclesfield (Gules, a chevron between three leopard's faces Or). Orders Order of the British Empire (not pictured)

== Citations ==
- G. E. Cokayne; with Vicary Gibbs, H. A. Doubleday, Geoffrey H. White, Duncan Warrand and Lord Howard de Walden, editors, The Complete Peerage of England, Scotland, Ireland, Great Britain and the United Kingdom, Extant, Extinct or Dormant, new ed., 13 volumes in 14 (1910–1959; reprint in 6 volumes, Gloucester, UK: Alan Sutton Publishing, 2000), volume XIII, page 460. Hereinafter cited as The Complete Peerage.
- Peter W. Hammond, editor, The Complete Peerage or a History of the House of Lords and All its Members From the Earliest Times, Volume XIV: Addenda & Corrigenda (Stroud, Gloucestershire: Sutton Publishing, 1998), page 705. Hereinafter cited as The Complete Peerage, Volume XIV.
- Charles Mosley, editor, Burke's Peerage, Baronetage & Knightage, 107th edition, 3 volumes (Wilmington, Delaware: Burke's Peerage (Genealogical Books) Ltd., 2003), volume 1, page 498. Hereinafter cited as Burke's Peerage and Baronetage, 107th edition.
- Cokayne, and others, The Complete Peerage, volume XIII, p. 461.
- Charles Mosley, Burke's Peerage and Baronetage, 107th edition, volume 1, page 499.
