= Bridgman =

Bridgman is a surname. Notable people with the surname include:

- Alfie Bridgman (born 2004), English footballer
- Elijah Coleman Bridgman (1801–1861, American missionary to China
- Eliza Jane Gillett Bridgman (1805–1871), American missionary in China
- Anthony Bridgman (1915–2006), Royal Air Force officer
- Frederick Arthur Bridgman (1847–1928), American painter
- George Bridgman (1865–1943), anatomist and artist
- George Soudon Bridgman (1839–1925), British architect and civil engineer
- Hugh Bridgman (1890–1953), Australian cricketer
- John Bridgman (died 1581), English Member of Parliament
- Jon Bridgman (1930–2015), American historian and academic
- Laura Bridgman (1829–1889), American deaf-blind woman
- Leonard Bridgman (1895–1980), British artist and book editor
- Lilian Bridgman (1866–1948), American architect
- Margaret Bridgman (1940–2009), Canadian politician
- Mel Bridgman (1955–2025), Canadian ice hockey player
- Olga Bridgman (1886–1974), American physician and academic
- Percy Williams Bridgman (1882–1961), American physicist
- Rae Bridgman, Canadian anthropologist, author and urban planner
- Richard W. Bridgman (c.1761–1820), English attorney and legal writer
- Tim Bridgman (born 1985), British racing driver
- Wally Bridgman (1931–1996), New Zealand cricketer

== See also ==
- Bridgman, Michigan
- Bridgman (crater)
- Bridgeman
