= Die Plage =

Photomontage by Harley Gaber

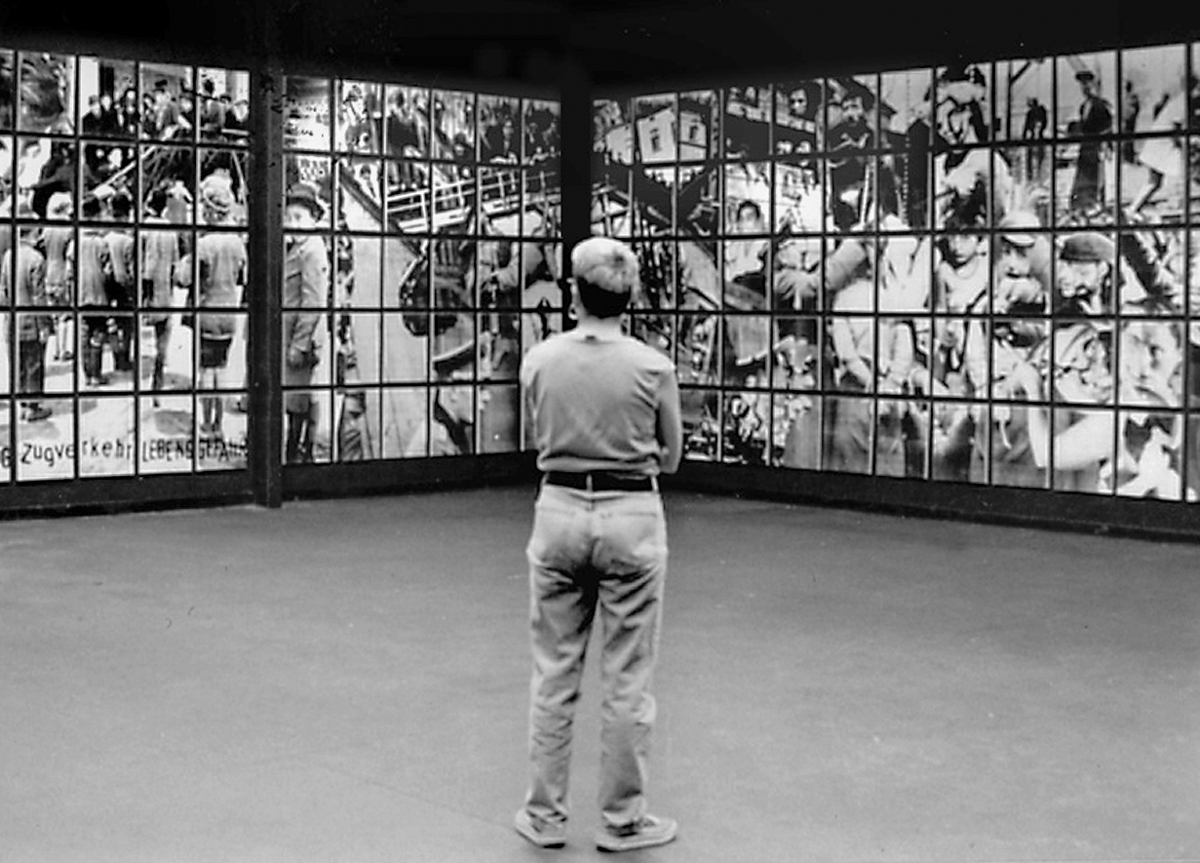
One section of the photomontage installation of "Die Plage" by Harley Gaber, exhibited in Newport Beach, Oregon, 2000. The full installation of the work will run about 1,680 feet in length.

Die Plage (English: The Plague) is a large-scale photomontage installation by artist and composer Harley Gaber (1943–2011) consisting of roughly 4,200 canvases that interpret German history from the Weimar Republic to the end of World War II. Portions of the work, exhibitions and reviews are viewable on the Die Plage website.

== History ==
Gaber worked on Die Plage between 1993 and 2002, incorporating paint, charcoal, and xerography into his photomontage technique, and exhibiting the work in several stages of completion. Die Plage has not yet been exhibited in its entirety, but if it were exhibited in full, it would run over 1,680 feet (510 m) long were it displayed as intended in a series of panels, five canvases high, about 12 feet (3.7 m).

Gaber distinguished Die Plage from other art historical Holocaust renderings in that this work "arises out of the collision between external circumstances and internal, personal circumstances," as it seeks to individualize perpetrators and victims of the Holocaust alike.

Eight years after Gaber's death in 2011, the Gaber estate gifted Die Plage to the Chicago-based Dan J. Epstein Family Foundation. The Foundation subsequently commissioned the digital scanning and cataloging of the work by Art Authority, and is seeking exhibition opportunities. In March 2025, the Foundation sponsored the creation of a comprehensive website which presents the art of Die Plage as well as background on the artist, prior exhibitions, reviews and more.

== Background ==
Gaber began work on Die Plage in November 1993, shortly after the death of his close friend and mentor, composer Kenneth Gaburo. Gaburo had been Gaber's music professor at the University of Illinois. Gaber was a highly trained musician and composer who had published several CD's of electronic music with acclaim, but never formally studied visual art. He worked exclusively on Die Plage until 2002. During those nine years, he moved four times, serving as primary care-giver for his father until he died in 1998. Gaber had a lifelong fascination with German culture: historical references recur throughout the entirety of his creative output, in visual arts and music alike, though nowhere more thoroughly than in Die Plage.

Gaber's Die Plage may refer to Albert Camus' 1947 work of the same name, La Peste, a novel about political morality and humanity during a plague in Algeria as an allegory of the French resistance to Nazi occupation in World War II.

== Technique and organization ==
To make the canvases in Die Plage, Gaber used a range of techniques including collage, photomontage, painting, xerographic manipulation, pastel, and charcoal. Razor blades and scissors were Gaber's primary tools. Although it was available, Gaber did not use photoshop in his alterations. Gaber gathered historic images and iconography from books, archives, and magazines; he then xeroxed, cut, spliced, and adhered images to the canvas with gesso or a heat gun. He gathered these materials from libraries and archives in the U.S., and from his many trips to Germany. The canvases, each measuring 16 by 20 inches, are framed with thin, light wood. Aside from the occasional application of blue paint, Gaber confined all of the other 4,200 canvases to a black-and-white palette.

Die Plage as a whole (running across the walls in five straight, continuous lines) mimics the form of sheet music, while the blank canvases act as notations for "pause and counterpoint," as rest notes would.

Gaber's approach to Die Plage draws inspiration from German photomontage pioneers Hannah Höch, John Heartfield, and George Grosz, whose influence is acknowledged in several canvases within the series. Höch, Heartfield, and Grosz, as artistic collaborators in the avant-garde Dadaist and New Objectivity movements, were credited with inventing the "anti-art" technique of pasting together pre-existing photographs, text, and clippings. Several of these works are themselves cut and pasted into Die Plage, including the notable example of Adolf Hitler's head in Heartfield's Adolf, the Superman: Swallows Gold and Spouts Tin (1932).

Gaber separated Die Plage into four discrete parts or movements, much like a symphony. The first section is dedicated to the Weimar Republic (1918–1933) and the first seven years of the Third Reich, including Hitler's rise in popularity, propaganda campaigns, the political defamation of modern art, the 1936 Olympics and the 1937 Entartete Kunst exhibition. Section II depicts persecution of the Jews. In this section, Gaber painted directly on the collages with abstract strokes of gray and blue. Section III reimagines the events in the prior two sections from more subjective points-of-view, and Section IV serves as an epilogue. The density of images within the canvases, and the rhythm of canvases within panels, change notably in each section.

Jonathan Saville of the San Diego Reader described the relationship between Die Plage's movements, writing, "images are introduced like musical themes, reappearing again and again, continually transformed." The sections and their sub-themes, according to Gaber, "flow" as they move between "broad historical premises and a private, intimate nightmare. Someone goes through this and finds his or her own way through it."

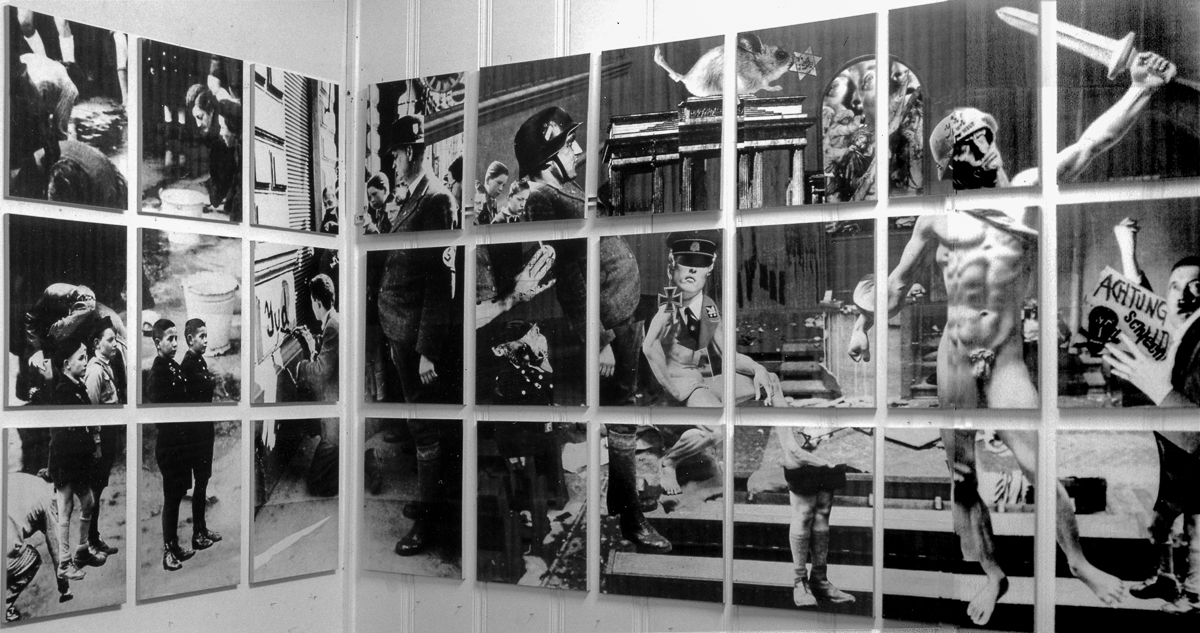
From the photomontage installation of "Die Plage" by Harley Gaber, exhibited at Half Moon Bay Coastal Repertory Theater, 1997

== Artistic intention ==
Gaber wrote in the program for his Half Moon Bay Coastal Repertory Theater exhibit:

In Die Plage, I make distinctions regarding how and why people behaved as they did where others see unanimity of intent. The malignant criminality that was increasingly perpetrated against so called Aryan and Non-Aryan people alike, in the name of the German people, is a fact. What is not a fact, is precisely what was going on in the minds of all the participants as they went through the events of that period. What they were thinking and feeling, what their motivations were for doing what they did or didn't do. My work, then, arises out of the collision between external circumstances and internal, personal circumstances.

Gaber believed photomontage had the effect of "reenergizing" historical photographic subjects, altering them and therefore humanizing the victims and perpetrators alike. In returning humanity to the people involved in carrying out the Holocaust, Gaber wanted to articulate a repudiation of the Holocaust as an "aberration," or "a part of history so terrible as to be disbelievable." Gaber explained, "People have removed the event from history... I'm acting in the spirit of trying to explain how it did happen. I'm asking, how do things happen, and how did this thing happen.'" [emphasis added].

== Exhibition history ==
- 1995, Southwestern College, San Diego, CA
- 1997, Anne Frank Installation, Coastal Repertory Theater to accompany a production of Diary of Anne Frank, Half Moon Bay, CA
- 2000, Anne Frank Installation, Newport, OR
- 2000, Installation, The Laboratory, Los Angeles, CA
- 2022 October 7 through 2023 January 29, Oregon Jewish Museum and Center for Holocaust Education, Portland, OR. This review by Friderike Heuer appeared in "Oregon Artswatch" on 2022 October 15. The author connects "Die Plage" to growing authoritarian, right-wing movements in Germany, Sweden, Italy, Hungary and the United States.
- 2025, Holocaust Museum LA, opened February 6, 2025 and closed on August 4, 2025, Los Angeles, CA

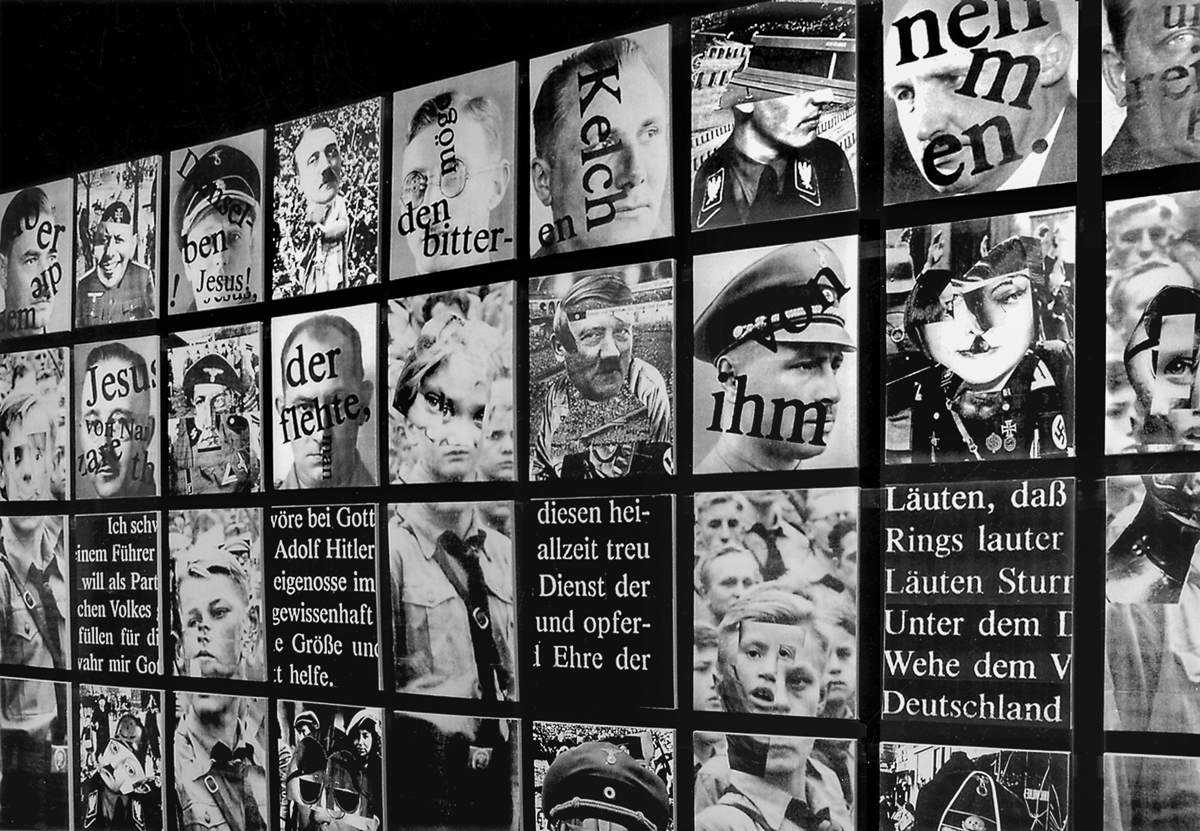
From the photomontage installation of "Die Plage" by Harley Gaber, exhibited at Half Moon Bay Coastal Repertory Theater during the run of "Diary of Anne Frank," 1997

== Reception ==
Die Plage has been broadly praised for its uncommon treatment of the Holocaust. In response to the 1995 Southwestern College exhibit of Die Plage's first 950 canvases, Jonathan Saville, writing for the San Diego Reader wrote:

In experiencing Die Plage, you first focus on the emotion-charged content of the pictures, the Nazi arrogance, the Jewish suffering. After a while, you become aware of the remarkable artistry displayed in each of the individual canvases, the powerful composition, the dramatic treatment of darks and lights, the fabulously expressive use of such aesthetic elements as repetition, contrast, density, patterning, and texture, where even the graininess of the enlarged photos is given an artistic purpose (Gaber's medium may be photo-montage, but his sensibilities and talents are those of a painter – and an exceptionally gifted one).

Saville labeled Die Plage "a major work of art of great splendor and profundity," adding that the work is among "the most searing and poignant treatments, in any genre, of the Nazis' extermination of the Jews," and "one of the supreme aesthetic statements of the 20th Century."

John Oxendine, writing in the San Mateo Times on October 1, 1994, understood Die Plage as the representation of individuals within a collective historical moment. According to Oxendine, Gaber "puts forth his argument for humanity as the images eviscerate and gush forth with a deep desire to bring the importance of the subject (not the event) before us, showing us the saddening plight of the victims, as he re-lives their despair when he brings them back to life." More broadly, "The Holocaust is the central event through which Gaber filters his vision of the consequences of our concerns for technology and power rather than humanity."

From September 23 to October 25, 2000, The Laboratory gallery in Los Angeles displayed about 700 of Die Plage's canvases. Los Angeles Times art critic Leah Ollman described the work this way:

Harley Gaber's vast, absorbing installation at the Laboratory steeps its viewers in the visual vocabulary of German politics and culture from the end of the first World War through the end of the second. Neither oppressively didactic nor consistently propagandistic, the work captures the tumult and terror of those years through a thoughtful, aggressive barrage of images. The heart of the show is made up of four continuous sections, whose subjects progress chronologically from the promising dynamism of the Weimar Republic through the depravities of the Nazi regime. In this terrifically engaging panorama, Gaber uses both the imagery and visual strategies of German art from those decades to invoke the character of the times.

== Criticism ==
Not all critics were ready to praise Gaber's work. Mark Shlim, after seeing the installation at The Laboratory in Los Angeles, critiqued Die Plage in an essay in Artists' News in April 2000, alleging that Gaber's art-historical collages amounted to an appropriation of the Shoah's place in the Jewish 20th century identity. Shlim posited that Gaber's decision to alter "images sacred to the Jews" lacked artistic justification.

== Gallery ==
Individual canvases, selected as representative of the range of subject matter, style and composition of the larger work. More single canvases can be viewed on the "Die Plage" website.

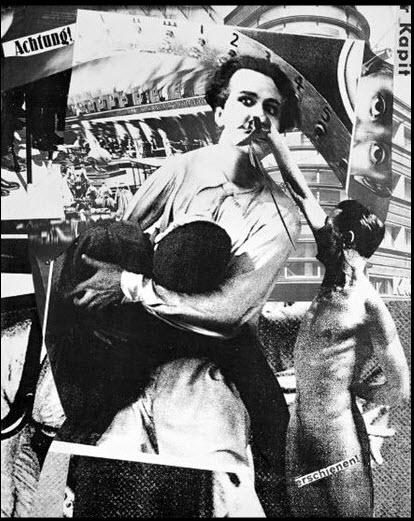

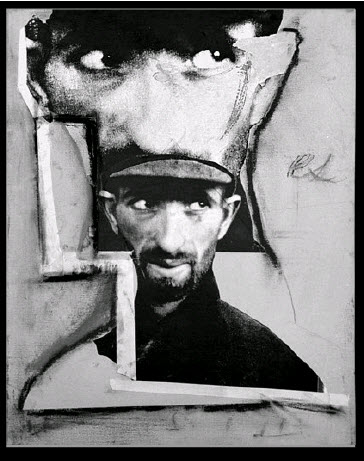

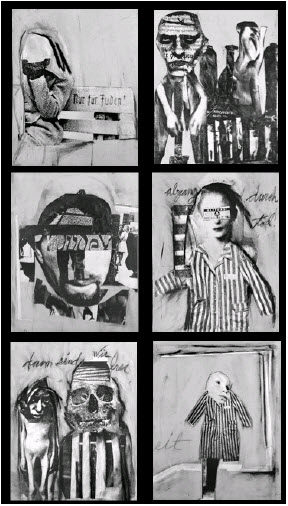

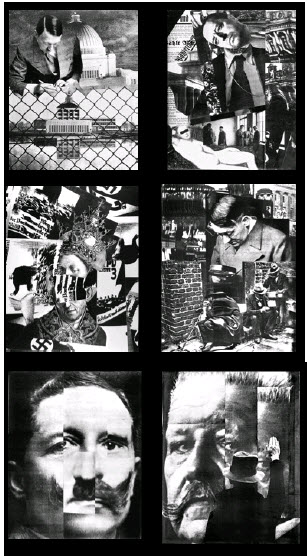

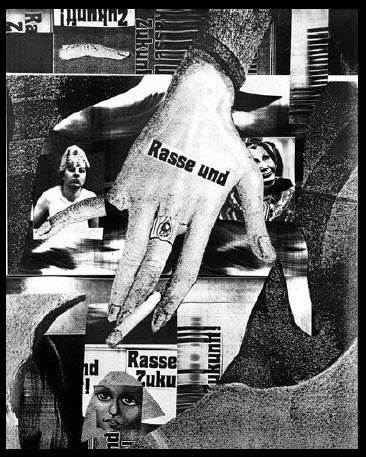
