= Suling Wang =

- Born: 1963 (age 62–63); Taichung, Taiwan

Suling Wang (王淑鈴) is an internationally recognized painter and contemporary artist, known predominantly for her large scale abstract works. In 2023, Wang was awarded the Medal of Arts by the United States Department of State. The medal was presented by Jill Biden at The White House in Washington D.C.

Wang's art is inspired by Taiwanese oral tradition from her childhood and her exploration of identity within Eastern and Western cultures. Her work is composed of meticulously created layers of painted calligraphy and cartoon-like forms overlaid atop other shapes that suggest trees, stems, and mountains.

== Early life and education ==
Wang grew up in rural Taiwan and in 1993 moved to London to study fine art at Central St. Martins College of Art and Design. She completed her master's degree in painting from the Royal College of Art in 1999.

== Exhibitions ==
Wang's work has been exhibited internationally in solo and group exhibitions. She held solo exhibitions at Eslite Gallery, Taipei(2011); Pékin Fine Arts, Beijing (2007); Soledad Lorenzo, Madrid (2006); Lehmann Maupin, New York (2005); and Victoria Miro Gallery, London (2005). She was included in group exhibitions such as Red Hot: Asian Art Today from the Chaney Collection at the Museum of Fine Arts Houston; Passion for Paint at The National Gallery in London, 2006 and The Guggenheim Collection: 1940s to Now at the National Gallery of Victoria, Melbourne, Australia, 2007.

== Museum collections ==
Her work is represented in the permanent collections of important museums, particularly in USA, where her paintings are the collections of Solomon R. Guggenheim Museum, New York; the Museum of Contemporary Art, Los Angeles; the Cincinnati Art Museum; The Utah Museum of Fine Arts; and the Rubell Museum, Miami; and the Pizzuti Collection (Columbus Museum of Art), Ohio.

Internationally her paintings can also be found in the collections of Museo Nacional Centro de Arte Reina Sofía, Madrid, Spain; White Rabbit Gallery, Australia; and the Taipei Fine Arts Museum, Taiwan.

== Awards and commissions ==
In 1995 Wang received the Swiss National Tourism/Tate Gallery Travel Award. In 1998, she was the recipient of the Studio Award from the Cité internationale des arts in Paris and the John Crane Travel Award.

In 2018, Wang was commissioned to make a 9 metre painting title The Singing River 2 for the new building of the American Institute in Taiwan in Taipei for the permanent collection of the United States Department of State.

In 2019, Wang was chosen to be an honouree by the Hirshhorn Museum, Washington DC for the museum's New York Gala.

In 2023, Wang was awarded the U.S. Medal of Arts in recognition of her artistic achievements and her promotion of cultural diplomacy.

== See also ==
- Taiwanese art
