= Victoria Miro Gallery =

Contemporary art gallery in London, England

Coordinates: 51°31′49.3″N 0°5′42″W

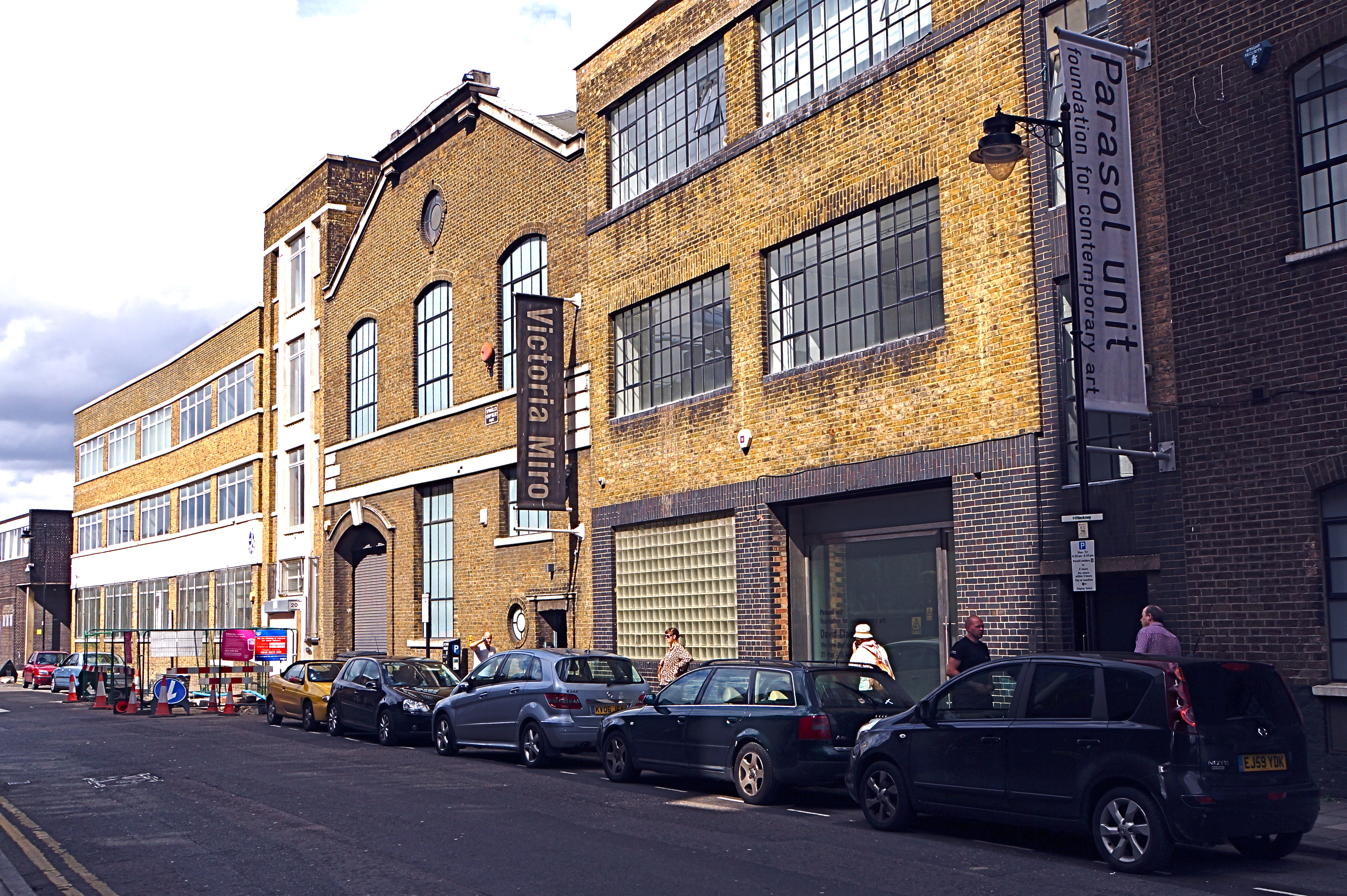
The gallery in 2012

The Victoria Miro Gallery is a British contemporary art gallery in London, run by Victoria Miro and (since 1997) her business partner Glenn Scott-Wright. Miro opened her first gallery in 1985 in Cork Street, before moving to larger premises in Islington in 2000 and later opening a second space in St George Street, Mayfair.

== Locations ==
=== Cork Street ===
Once her children started school, Victoria Miro opened her first gallery in Cork Street, Mayfair, in 1985, where she became one of the principal dealers, although the premises at 750 square feet (70 m^{2}) were little larger than a studio apartment. In the late 1980s, she opened a second gallery in Florence, Italy, but shut it in 1991 after the art market slump.

Long waiting lists of collectors and museums developed to buy work from the galleries, and Miro reported that even Charles Saatchi, when he bought a Cecily Brown painting from her, "seemed pleased to get one".

=== Wharf Road ===
In November 2000, the gallery moved to its present location in 16 Wharf Road, Islington, adjacent to the cutting-edge art area of Hoxton, where it is housed in a two-floor, 10,000-square-foot (930 m^{2}), converted Victorian furniture factory, ten times the size of the Cork Street gallery. Miro's co-director, Glenn Scott Wright, attributed the move to the "buzz" in the area, where Jay Jopling's White Cube gallery had also moved, and saw other galleries following suit, since rents in the West End of London were quadrupling. She was described by Christie's curator, Gerard Goodrow, as "a leading figure in making the East End the center of contemporary art in London."

A group show prior to the conversion of the building brought 4,000 visitors, which it would have taken the Cork Street gallery six months to attract. The conversion architect, Trevor Horne retained some of the original features of the building, such as the worn staircase and rough roof beams, while the waste ground at the rear next to Regent's Canal was left to artist Ian Hamilton Finlay to regenerate. The opening show by Thomas Demand was of paper and card reconstructions of photographs of interiors.

The gallery's yearly turnover is in the tens of millions of pounds.

The Upper Room by Chris Ofili was exhibited at the Wharf Road space in 2002: it consists of 13 paintings, each of a rhesus macaque monkey, installed in a purpose-built room designed by David Adjaye. Adrian Searle, art critic of The Guardian, wrote that it was a work the Tate had to buy. In July 2005, the Tate announced the purchase of the work as the centrepiece of a new hang at Tate Britain.

In 2022, art historian and author Katy Hessel celebrated the publication of her best-selling book The Story of Art Without Men with an exhibition that she curated at the Wharf Road space of 16 works by women artists, including Jadé Fadojutimi and Flora Yukhnovich.

=== St George Street ===
In 2013, Victoria Miro Gallery opened a second space in a converted bank office in St George Street, Mayfair, designed by Claudio Silvestrin and executed by project architect Michael Drain. Its lease ended in 2020.

=== San Marco ===
In 2017, Victoria Miro Gallery opened an exhibition space in the former Galleria il Capricorno in a 17th-century building in the San Marco neighbourhood of Venice.

== External shows ==
In September 2002, the gallery was one of the 18 cutting-edge art galleries with international reputations to be selected for The Galleries Show at the Royal Academy, an exhibition curated by Norman Rosenthal and Max Wigram to highlight the role played by galleries in an artist's creative progress, as well as putting work on sale and realigning the Academy with a greater involvement in current art.

The gallery was one of the 118 galleries worldwide to be selected for the first Frieze Art Fair in London in October 2003, alongside other leading British galleries, White Cube and Gagosian.

In March 2004, at New York's Armory Show, the gallery sold everything on the opening day; this included work by a new artist to the gallery and recent graduate, Raqib Shaw, whose first solo show in London of 18 drawings and five paintings, stemming from the work of Hieronymous Bosch and priced up to $20,000, had previously sold out.

In December 2004, at Art Basel Miami Beach, the gallery sold out a room of paintings by Suling Wang, who had not at that time had a solo show. The room was re-hung and sold out again.

== Artists ==
Victoria Miro represents numerous living artists, including:

- Doug Aitken
- Njideka Akunyili Crosby
- Jules de Balincourt
- Hernan Bas
- Varda Caivano
- Verne Dawson
- Peter Doig
- Stan Douglas
- Elmgreen and Dragset
- William Eggleston
- Inka Essenhigh
- Ian Hamilton Finlay
- Barnaby Furnas
- David Harrison
- Alex Hartley
- NS Harsha
- Christian Holstad
- Chantal Joffe
- Isaac Julien
- Idris Khan
- Udomsak Krisanamis
- John Korner
- Yayoi Kusama (since 2008)
- Tracey Moffatt
- Wangechi Mutu
- Chris Ofili
- Jacco Olivier
- Grayson Perry
- Tal R
- Conrad Shawcross
- Do Ho Suh
- Sarah Sze
- Adriana Varejão
- Suling Wang
- Stephen Willats
- Flora Yukhnovich

In addition, the gallery manages various artist estates, including:

- Milton Avery
- Alice Neel
- Paula Rego (since 2020)
- Francesca Woodman

== See also ==
- Parasol Unit Foundation for Contemporary Art, next door
