= Harley Gaber =

- Born: June 5, 1943; Chicago, Illinois, U.S.
- Died: June 16, 2011 (aged 68) Gallup, New Mexico, U.S.
- Genres: Minimalism; experimental; electronic; drone; Photomontage
- Occupations: Composer; Visual artist
- Years active: 1963–2011
- Labels: Innova Recordings; New World; Titanic; Edition RZ

Harley Gaber (June 5, 1943 – June 16, 2011) was a visual artist and composer known for his minimalist and spectral approaches to time and sound. With his emphasis on quiet sustained sonorities and textures, Gaber is counted among the early American minimalist composers, and considered to be a forerunner of drone and spectralism. His best known recorded composition, The Winds Rise in the North, has been called by musician Keith Fullerton Whitman "one of the holy grails of minimalism in music in the 20th century."

In 1978, he stopped composing, moved from New York City to San Diego, California, and began creating photo-collages, mixed media collages, paintings, and pen-and-ink works he called graphic music. However, in 1993 he started work on Die Plage (The Plague), an art-historical narrative of Germany from the Weimar Republic to the end of World War II, completing it in 2002. It grew to become a massive work of approximately 4,200 photomontaged canvases measuring 16 by 20 inches (41 by 51 cm).

In the final three years of his life Gaber composed two works: I Saw My Mother Ascending Mt Fuji and In Memoriam 2010. The album of his last work was released two weeks before Gaber committed suicide in June 2011.

== Artistic and musical influences ==
=== Artistic influences ===
German Expressionism and Dada are the artistic movements that most influenced him. The particular artists that critics cite as evident in Gaber's work are Otto Dix, George Grosz, and Ernst Ludwig Kirchner. The photomontage works of John Heartfield and Hannah Höch influenced him greatly, as did their use of photographs to subvert and criticize their subject matter.

=== Musical influences ===
Horace Reisburg, Gaber's music teacher at New Trier High School from 1958 to 1961 in Winnetka, Illinois, encouraged him to continue his studies at the Aspen Institute with Darius Milhaud in the summer of 1961. Gaber enrolled that fall in the University of Illinois, Champaign-Urbana, where he studied first with Lajaren Hiller. But the faculty member who influenced Gaber the most was Kenneth Gaburo. The two formed a life-long friendship in which they investigated and challenged each other's basic aesthetic assumptions. In 1963, he moved to Rome to pursue further studies in composition with Aldo Clementi, Franco Evangelisti, Boris Poorena and Giulio Rotoli. On concluding his studies in 1964, he returned to the U.S., settling in New York City. From 1964 to 1966, Gaber studied with William J. Sydeman, who was on the faculty of the Mannes College of Music. Gaber was influenced by the creative ferment among fellow composers in the minimalist music world of New York City, especially Morton Feldman.

== Works ==
=== Artistic works ===
Gaber's visual art work took many forms, including photography, pen and ink, collage, photomontage and drawings. His pen-and-ink drawings of graphic music were first exhibited in a group show in Bern, Switzerland, in 1974. By April 1976, his graphic music work was featured in a solo exhibition at Gallery 219 in Buffalo, New York. In September 1976, the Alternative Center for International Arts, now known as the Alternative Museum, mounted a solo show of his drawings and graphic music.

After moving to San Diego in 1982, Gaber turned to photography as his favored medium. By 1985, his experiments with photomontage led to acquisition of one of his works and its inclusion in an exhibit by the Museum of Photographic Arts in San Diego's Balboa Park, California. In the late 1980s, he experimented with mixed media collage and wood constructions. Both the wood and mixed media works led to exhibits in San Diego, California and Santa Fe, New Mexico in 1990 and 1991.

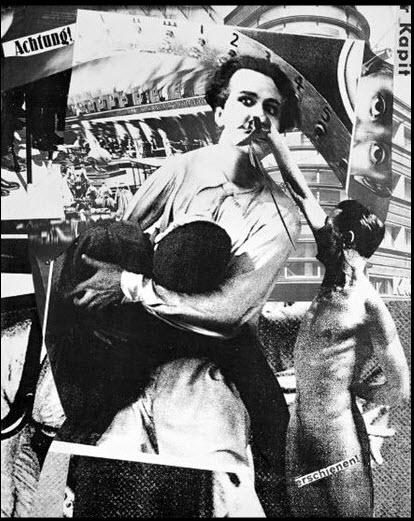
One of 4,200 panels from Die Plage (The Plague) by Harley Gaber. Canvases are photomontage and charcoal, black-and-white, 16 by 20 in (41 by 51 cm).

In 1993, Gaber started work on what would become his magnum opus, Die Plage (The Plague). This work soon became the center of Gaber's efforts, displacing his work in all other media. When he completed it in 2002, it was composed of about 4,200 canvases, each measuring 16 by 20 inches (41 by 51 cm). Gaber used xerography to modify photographs, and then combined them on canvas using photomontage and charcoal. The work is ordered in chronological sequence, starting with Weimar Republic and ending at the conclusion of World War II. When exhibited in its entirety, with canvases arranged in rows five high, the work runs nearly 1,680 feet (510 m) in length. Portions of the work, exhibitions and reviews are viewable on the Die Plage website.

In 1995, Southwestern College in Chula Vista, California, mounted an exhibit of the first 950 canvases—its first public showing. Art critic Jonathan Saville, writing for the San Diego Reader, wrote:

In experiencing Die Plage (The Plague), you first focus on the emotion-charged content of the pictures, the Nazi arrogance, the Jewish suffering. After awhile, you become aware of the remarkable artistry displayed in each of the canvases, the powerful composition, the dramatic treatment of darks and lights, the fabulously expressive use of such aesthetic elements as repetition, contrast, density, patterning and texture, where even the graininess of the enlarged photos is given an artistic purpose. (Gaber's medium may be photo-montage, but his sensibilities and talents are those of a painter-–and an exceptionally gifted one.)

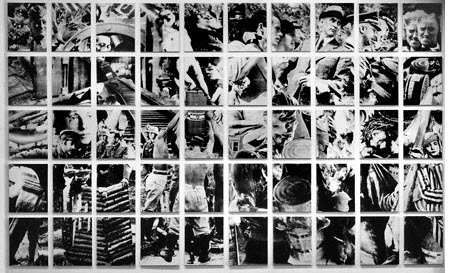
This exhibition at Southwestern College in San Diego, California, in 1995, was the first public showing of Die Plage (The Plague) This panel measured about 10 feet high and about 20 feet long.

From September 23 to October 21, 2000, The Lab in Los Angeles, California exhibited roughly 700 canvases from all sections of the work done to date. Leah Ollman, an art critic for the Los Angeles Times, wrote:

Harley Gaber's vast, absorbing installation at the Laboratory steeps its viewers in the visual vocabulary of German politics and culture from the end of the first World War through the end of the second. Neither oppressively didactic nor consistently propagandistic, the work captures the tumult and terror of those years through a thoughtful, aggressive barrage of images. The heart of the show is made up of four continuous sections, whose subjects progress chronologically from the promising dynamism of the Weimar Republic through the depravities of the Nazi regime. In this terrifically engaging panorama, Gaber uses both the imagery and visual strategies of German art from those decades to invoke the character of the times.

==== Selected exhibitions and awards ====
- Group Show, Music Notation and Graphic Music, Bern, Switzerland (1974).
- MacDowell (artists' residency and workshop) for Music Composition, 1974, 1975, 1977.
- Solo Exhibition, Graphics and Graphic Music, Gallery 219, Buffalo, NY (April 1976).
- Solo Exhibition, Graphics and Graphic Music, Alternative Center for International Arts, New York City, NY (September 1976).
- Sound Exhibition, MoMA PS1, Queens, New York (September-November 1979).
- Solo Exhibition, SX70 Polaroid, Athenaeum Music and Arts Library, San Diego, CA (1983).
- Group Show, 42 San Diego Artists, Photo-Collages, La Jolla Museum of Contemporary Art, San Diego, CA (1985).
- Solo Exhibition, Graphic Music, Graphics, Photo-Collages, SX70 Polaroid and 35MM Photography, Photography Gallery, San Diego, CA (1985).
- Group Show, Photo-Collages, Museum of Photographic Arts Permanent Collection Show, San Diego, CA (1985).
- Solo Exhibition, Paintings and Mixed-Media Collages, Gwydion Gallery, San Diego, CA (1989).
- Solo Exhibition, Paintings, Wood Construction Pieces and Mixed-Media Collages, R.B. Stevenson Gallery, San Diego, CA (1990).
- Group Show, Mixed-Media Collages and Paper Cutouts, Hartman & Company Gallery, San Diego, CA (1994).
- Die Plage (The Plague) Installation, Southwestern College, San Diego, CA (1995).
- Die Plage (The Plague) Anne Frank Installation, Coastal Repertory Theater, to accompany a production of Diary of Anne Frank, Half Moon Bay, CA (1997).
- Die Plage (The Plague) Anne Frank Installation, Newport, OR (2000, Grant: Collins Foundation).
- Die Plage (The Plague) Installation, The Laboratory, Los Angeles, CA (September 2000).
- Die Plage (The Plague) Exhibit at the Oregon Museum of Jewish History, Portland, OR (October 2022-January 2023).
- Die Plage (The Plague) Exhibit at the Holocaust Museum of Los Angeles, Los Angeles, CA (February 2025-July 2025).

=== Musical works ===
Gaber's first recorded composition, Ludus Primus: Two Flutes and Vibraphone, (1966) was followed by Chimyaku: Solo Alto Flute (1968), Kata: Solo Violin for (1969) and Michi: Solo Violin (1969). Composer Eric Richards described Gaber's minimalist music as an effort to "get inside the music."

He notated minute directions for the attack, dynamic changes, and other physical characteristics of each and every note, in ways that, while they might have superficially resembled some of the serial music of that time, were really his attempt to get beyond appearances, and slow down the sense of time in the music through a deeper investigation of the sound itself.

His compositions in the 1970s were mainly for strings, and in these works, he strived to suspend time. The Winds Rise in the North: String Quintet (1974), Sovereign of the Centre (1972) and Indra's Net (1974) are considered to be his most significant compositions. These minimalist works reflected Gaber's study of Buddhism."

Harley Gaber resumed composing in 2008, after receiving a commission from William Hellerman of the Downtown Ensemble, resulting in Webern's Gambit, a multi-media work for film and cello. It associated film imagery, including old German footage and recordings, with a cello part derived from pitches in a movement of Anton Webern's Piano Variations. In 2009, Harley Gaber composed I Saw My Mother Ascending Mt. Fuji using GarageBand to assemble and rework existing acoustic sound sources, in a manner similar to his visual photomontage works. It was produced by Philip Blackburn, and released on Innova Recordings. In 2011, Innova Recordings also published In Memoriam 2010, a work commissioned by the Dan J. Epstein Family Foundation in memory of his mother.

Gaber's contributions as a composer were described by Shane Mack, in the obituary which he wrote for the British music publication, The Wire:

he and his music shared the same complex personality, uncompromised by marketing concerns or wanting to fit into any scene.... it is the high level of perfectly-realised thoughts in sound, that could only have sprung from his fragile life of outsider-dom, that ensures his stature as one of America's most important artists.

Major performances of his work were produced on May 13, 1977, by the New York Philharmonic Chamber Ensemble, conducted by Pierre Boulez; the Berlin Festival; the Tanglewood Music Festival; the Once Festival at the University of Michigan; the Kitchen in New York City; Evenings for New Music in Buffalo and New York City.

==== Selected compositions and recordings ====
- Ludus Primus: Two Flutes and Vibraphone (1966), on Gaber/Hellerman/Zonn. New York: New World Records, NWCRL299. Reissue of 1972 LP on Composers Recordings Inc. Score published by Lingua Press.
- Chimyaku: Solo Alto Flute (1968) Score published by Lingua Press.
- Kata: Solo Violin (1969), On Gaber/Hellerman/Zonn. New York: New World Records, NWCRL299. Reissue of 1972 LP on Composers Recordings Inc. Score published by Lingua Press.
- Koku: Solo Flute (1970)
- Michi: Solo Violin (1972) Score published by Lingua Press.
- Sovereign of the Centre: Four Violins (1972), Berlin: Edition RZ, ed. RZ 4008–9. Reissue with additional notes, of 1976 LP on Titanic Records.
- The Winds Rise in the North: String Quintet (1974), Berlin: Edition RZ, ed. RZ 4008–9. Reissue with additional notes, of 1976 LP on Titanic Records. Reissue on CD in 2007 by Edition RZ.
- The Realm of Indra's Net (1974), Berlin: Edition RZ, ed. RZ 1022. 2010
- I Saw My Mother Ascending Mt. Fuji (2009), St. Paul, MN: Innova Recordings, 231. 2010.
- In Memoriam 2010 (2011), Minneapolis: St. Paul, MN: Innova Recordings, 243. 2011.

== Legacy ==
In recognition of his contributions, Gaber was the subject of a symposium at The Tectonics Festival, New York, on May 24, 2014. A panel on Gaber's life and works was moderated by composer Eric Richards, with discussants Paul Paccione, Ned Sublette and Bill Hellerman.
