= Robin Bridgeman, 3rd Viscount Bridgeman =

British politician and peer (1930–2026)

The Right Honourable The Viscount Bridgeman FCA
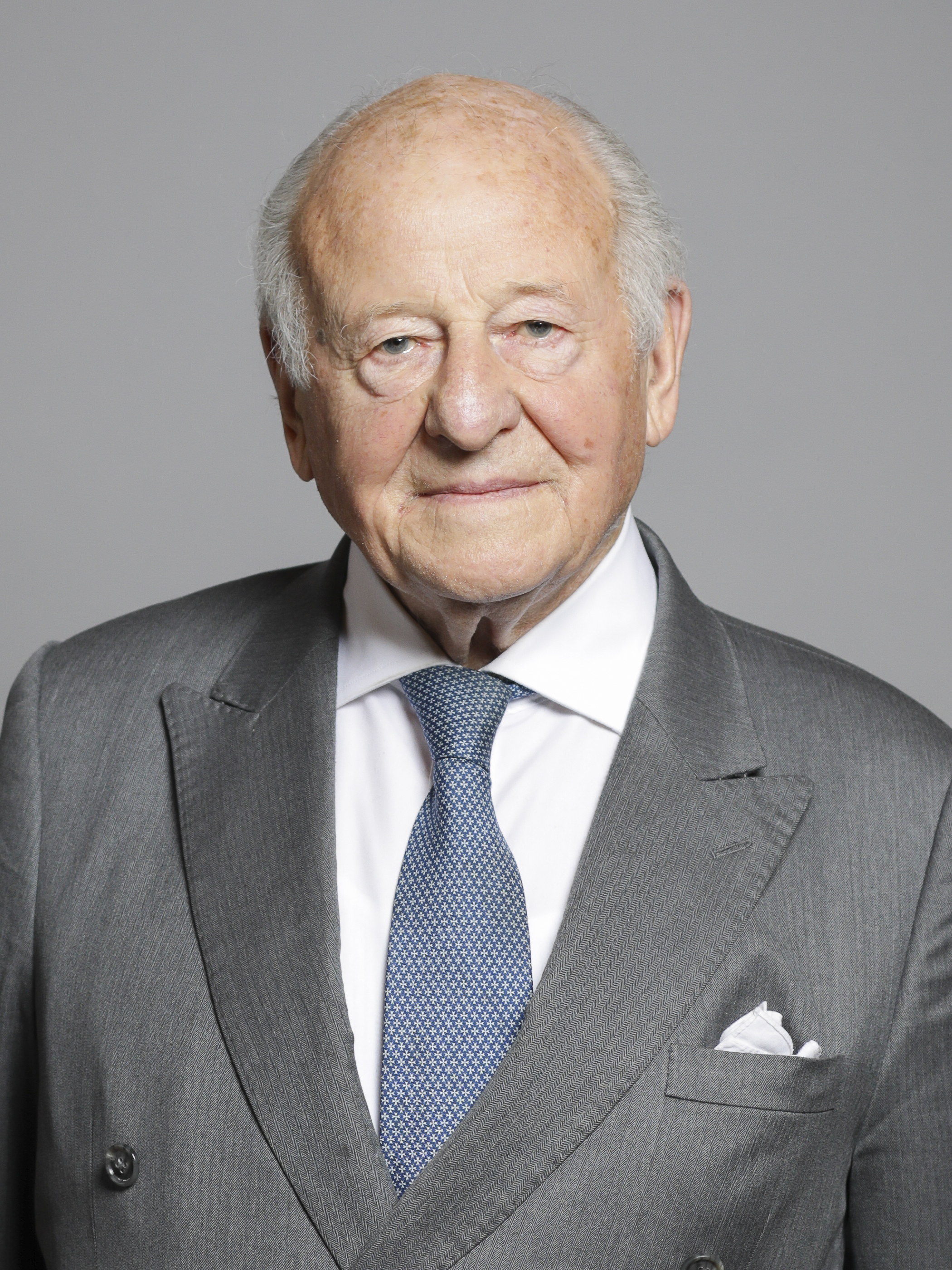

Member of the House of Lords
- Lord Temporal
- as a hereditary peer 20 January 1983 – 11 November 1999
- Preceded by: The 2nd Viscount Bridgeman
- Succeeded by: Seat abolished (Note: Pursuant to the House of Lords Act 1999.)
- as an elected hereditary peer 11 November 1999 – 9 April 2026
- Election: 1999
- Preceded by: Seat established
- Succeeded by: Seat abolished (Note: Pursuant to the House of Lords (Hereditary Peers) Act 2026.)

Personal details
- Born: Robin John Orlando Bridgeman; 5 December 1930
- Died: 9 April 2026 (aged 95)
- Party: Conservative
- Spouse: Harriet Turton (m. 1966)
- Parent: Geoffrey Bridgeman (father)
- Occupation: Chartered accountant; peer

Knight of Malta ribbon

Robin John Orlando Bridgeman, 3rd Viscount Bridgeman (5 December 1930 – 9 April 2026), was a British hereditary peer and politician. He was a member of the House of Lords, and sat as a Conservative.

== Background ==
Bridgeman was the son of Brigadier Geoffrey Bridgeman and Mary Meriel Gertrude Talbot, and the grandson of William Bridgeman, 1st Viscount Bridgeman. He was educated at Eton. He served in the Rifle Brigade in the years 1950 and 1951, commissioned as second lieutenant, and in the Royal Green Jackets reaching the rank of lieutenant.

== Career ==
In 1958, Lord Bridgeman became a chartered accountant. He was partner of Fenn and Crosthwaite in 1973, and of Henderson Crosthwaite from 1975 to 1986. From 1988 to 1990, he was director of Guinness Mahon, and from 1988 to 1994 director of Nestor-BNA. He has further been director of The Bridgeman Art Library since 1972.

Bridgeman was a past chairman of the Friends of Lambeth Palace Library and treasurer of the New England Company and the Florence Nightingale Aid in Sickness Trust. He was also a chairman of the Hospital of St John and St Elizabeth and trustee of Music at Winchester. Between 1992 and 2000, he was special trustee of the Hammersmith and Queen Charlotte's Hospital Authority.

He was a Knight of the Sovereign Military Order of Malta. He succeeded his uncle, the 2nd Viscount, to the titles on 17 November 1982 and was one of the ninety elected hereditary peers in the House of Lords, where he sat for the Conservative Party. He was a spokesman on Home Affairs and a Government Whip.

Bridgeman died in office twenty days before provisions in the House of Lords (Hereditary Peers) Act 2026 came into force that would have otherwise excluded him from the Lords.

== Family ==
Bridgeman married Victoria Harriet Lucy Turton, daughter of Ralph Meredyth Turton, on 10 December 1966. They had four sons:

- Hon. William Orlando Caspar Bridgeman (1968–2001)
- Luke Robinson Orlando Bridgeman, 4th Viscount Bridgeman (born 1971)
- Hon. Esmond Francis Ralph Orlando Bridgeman (born 1974)
- Hon. Orlando Henry Geoffrey Bridgeman (born 1983)

Bridgeman died on 9 April 2026, at the age of 95.

== Notes ==
Peerage of the United Kingdom
Preceded by Robert Bridgeman	Viscount Bridgeman; 1982–2026; Member of the House of Lords (1983–1999)	Succeeded by Luke Bridgeman
Parliament of the United Kingdom
New office created by the House of Lords Act 1999	Elected hereditary peer to the House of Lords under the House of Lords Act 1999; 1999–2026	Vacant
