= Alan B. Oppenheimer =

President and founder of Open Door Networks, Inc.

Alan B. Oppenheimer is the creator of the mobile app Art Authority Museum, president and founder of Art Authority LLC and Open Door Networks, Inc. From 1983 to 1994, he worked for Apple, Inc. where he helped design the AppleTalk network system for the original Macintosh computer. He also played a key role in the production of the LaserWriter printer, AppleTalk Remote Access, AppleShare file server and the Apple Internet Router. Alan is author of several books and runs the Alan and Priscilla Oppenheimer Foundation with his wife.

== Education ==
A graduate from the Massachusetts Institute of Technology in 1983, his graduate thesis was “A Local Area Disk Server for RT-11.” (RT-11 was one of the Digital Equipment Corporation's operating systems). Per the abstract, his thesis focused on “the potential of the fast-growing field of Local Area Networking… explored through the creation of an Ethernet-based disk server for the popular standalone RT-11 operating system.”

== Apple, Inc. ==
After graduating from MIT, Alan was hired to work for Apple Inc. in 1983. His team was responsible for creating a network for a low-cost computer project called the Macintosh led by Apple co-founder Steve Jobs. Oppenheimer was responsible for AppleTalk's protocols in the Macintosh and the LaserWriter printer. Initial sales of the Macintosh computer were strong but follow up sales were relatively weak. However, it is suggested that the LaserWriter printer (along with PageMaker, an early desktop publishing package) was responsible for the success of the Macintosh because it was the world's first reasonably priced PostScript laser printer.

During his tenure at Apple, Inc. from 1983 to 1995, Oppenheimer also worked on AppleShare, the Apple Internet Router and Apple Remote Access. Regarding the creative energy of the company at the time: "As a kid right out of school I didn’t realize [just] how exciting it was. It was like a rookie going to the World Series in his first season.”

== Art Authority ==
“Art Authority started out as media viewing software application for Apple's iOS and Macintosh, and Amazon's Kindle Fire." Best described as "a virtual museum," the app allows users to access a collection of classic western paintings and sculptures by hundreds of artists. At launch, it offered nearly 40,000 high-resolution images of classic works of art. Built specifically for the iPad, Art Authority was described as “an experience unlike any other” when it was released in 2010. The app was one of the first art-related apps made available on the App Store. Since its release, it has consistently been referenced as a Top-10 product

In 2014, Art Authority expanded its offerings by adding a feature that allowed users to purchase and access art prints, marking the beginning of a broader effort by Oppenheimer and Open Door Networks to bridge digital art with physical works. This transition led to the formation of Art Authority LLC and the acquisition of 1000Museums, an online platform that works in partnership with museums worldwide to offer high-quality reproductions of artwork for purchase, enabling users to engage with art in both digital and tangible forms. The Art Authority Museum was a natural extension of this work when Apple shipped its Vision Pro headset.

== Open Door Networks, Inc. ==
In 1995, Oppenheimer founded Open Door Networks. Three years later, the company released the first firewall for the Macintosh (Mac OS 8.1). Since then, they have been instrumental in providing security for Apple products with consistent releases between 1998 and 2006. In addition, Oppenheimer exclusively licensed the Open Door Networks firewall to Symantec which was included as the core firewall code for Norton Internet Security for Mac in 2000.

== We-Envision ==
Realizing early that the iPhone was going to be a big success for Apple, Oppenheimer changed Open Door's focus towards mobile app development. In a partnership with company Project A (formerly “We-Envision” when working together), Open Door shipped 100 “Envi” apps, accumulated over 200,000 downloads, and produced apps in five separate categories (Art and Architecture, Space, Travel, Fun and Other which included photography and holiday themed apps) within their first year. However, the height of Oppenheimer’s push into mobile app development came in 2010 with the release of Art Authority.

== Author ==
In addition to his tenure with Apple, Inc., Art Authority and Open Door, Oppenheimer has co-written several books. Published in 1990, Inside AppleTalk explores the protocol architecture of the AppleTalk network system. Co-authored with Charles Whitaker, Internet Security for Your Macintosh: A Guide for the Rest of Us is a beginners guide to personal Macintosh security for both Mac OS 9 and OS X. And, in 2012 Oppenheimer co-wrote an e-book companion to the Art Authority app called Exploring Art with Art Authority.
