= Victoria Miro =

British art dealer

Victoria Marion Miro OBE (born 1 July 1945) is a British art dealer, "one of the grandes dames of the Britart scene" and founder of the Victoria Miro Galleries in London and Venice.

== Biography ==
Miro was born into a Jewish working-class family in London. Her father ran a Covent Garden grocery stall. Her parents were keen on culture and saved, so the family could take holidays in Italy to see the art there. She went to school at Copthall grammar school in North London, then studied painting at the Slade School of Fine Art, which she says helped her understand art from the point of view of the artist. For a short period during the early 1970s, she worked as a secondary school art teacher. She married businessman Warren Miro and had a son (Oliver) and daughter (Alex) in the 1970s. She says she lost the creative urge during this period because she was "immersed in family".

In 1985, when her children were old enough, she started her first gallery in Cork Street, London, taking over the gallery space previously owned by dealer Robert Fraser (who was dying of AIDS). In the late 1980s, she opened a second gallery in Florence, Italy, but shut it in 1991 after the art market slump. In 2000, her London gallery moved to a much larger 8,000 square foot (743 square metres) premises in East London.

Two of her babysitters at that time were a couple who later became well-known artists, Jake Chapman, who showed at her gallery, and Sam Taylor-Wood (since married to Aaron Taylor-Johnson).

One of her sources for finding new artists was the Royal College of Art. Through tutor Peter Doig she learnt about Chris Ofili, Cecily Brown and Chantal Joffe. She discovered Thomas Demand at another London college, Goldsmiths.

She has a reputation for integrity amongst clients; one of them, Arthur Goldberg, said, "She's a real quality person. That goes somewhere in the art world, where not every dealer can be trusted." She is widely known within the art world but less so outside it, and has been described as "the quiet woman of British art". In 2001, despite her success, she rejected identification with the art establishment, saying "I like to think I still take risks in the gallery with younger artists. To me, 'establishment' just means dull."

In October 2013, Miro launched her second art gallery in London, known as Victoria Miro Mayfair. In May 2017 she opened a third gallery Victoria Miro Venice.
