= David Harrison (artist) =

- Born: 1954 (age 71–72); London, England
- Education: Saint Martin's School of Art
- Known for: Painting, Sculpture
- Website: www.victoria-miro.com/artists/35-david-harrison/

David Harrison (born 1954) is an English artist living and working in London. and is represented by Victoria Miro.

== Biography ==
Harrison received his BA from Saint Martin's School of Art in 1984. Malcolm McLaren invited him to front the music projects The Sex Pistols and Masters of the Backside, with Chrissie Hynde and David Vanian, around this time. His work was shown in the East End Gallery at the Whitechapel Gallery in 2004, and his first one-man exhibition was at the Victoria Miro Gallery in London in 2005. A solo show, Green and Pleasant Land, was held at the Daniel Reich Gallery in New York in 2009.

A book, David Harrison, was published in 2009 by Philip Wilson Publishers, with a foreword by Lucinda Lambton, an essay by Alistair Robinson, director of The Northern Gallery for Contemporary Art, and an interview with Peter Doig.

== Exhibitions ==
- Victoria Miro, London, 2005
- Green and Pleasant Land, Daniel Reich Gallery, New York (2008)
- David Harrison, Victoria_Miro_Gallery, London (2005)
- David Harrison: Existence, Victoria_Miro_Gallery, London (2009)
- Second Nature, VW (VeneKlasen/Werner), Berlin (2012)
- Flowers of Evil, Victoria Miro, London (2015)
- Nightshift, Sargent's Daughters, New York (2016)
- Photographs, TRAMPS, London (2017)
- Remake Remodel, Churchgate Gallery, Porlock (2017)
