= Society of London Art Dealers =

The Society of London Art Dealers (SLAD) is an organisation founded in 1932 for the promotion of dealers of fine art and antiquities in London.

It is a founding member of the British Art Market Federation and a member of the Confédération Internationale des Négociants en Oeuvres d'Art (CINOA). The organisation has 185 members across the United Kingdom which include art galleries, art advisory firms, and private dealerships.

The SLAD was a proponent for the creation of the Artists' Collecting Society.

In 2023, jointly with the British Antique Dealers’ Association (Bada) and the Association of Art and Antiques Dealers (Lapada), the Society of London Art Dealers launched a series of anti-money laundering training videos to help art dealers avoid illegal financial solutions.

== Governance ==
- 1974-1977: Godfrey Pilkington
- Since 2023: Nicholas Maclean
