= John Bridgeman (died 1523) =

English politician (by 1489 – 1523)

John Bridgeman (by 1489 – 1523) was an English politician.

== Personal life ==
He married Alison Bartlett, daughter of Richard Bartlett, widow of a man named Philip.

== Professional life ==
He was a member (MP) of the parliament of England for Exeter in 1523. He was described as 'a wise man ... of great experience.'
