= Jon Bridgman =

American historian and academic (1930–2015)

Jon M. Bridgman (July 10, 1930 – March 9, 2015) was an American historian and a professor emeritus of the University of Washington.

Bridgman, a graduate of Stanford University, and former USN gunnery officer on a destroyer, received his doctorate from Stanford University in 1961 and spent his entire teaching career at the University of Washington. His particular area of expertise was modern European history. He was the recipient of the university's Distinguished Teaching Award in 1973. His popularity as a speaker earned him a position lecturing to the annual meeting of the UW Alumni Association from 1987 to 2002, and the alumni have rewarded his retirement by donating funds to endow the Jon Bridgman Professorship in History at the University of Washington.

He taught classes on topics related to his own Past and Present Society, a club for students of history and Bridgman enthusiasts. As a historical writer, he published several works such as The Revolt of the Hereros (Perspectives on Southern Africa) and The End of the Holocaust: The Liberation of the Camps.

== Selected publications ==
- Bridgman, Jon. (1981). The Revolt of the Hereros. Berkeley: University of California Press.
- Bridgman, Jon; Hutton Jones, Richard. (1990) The End of the Holocaust: The Liberation of the Camps. Areopagitica Press.
