= Maurice Bridgeman =

British businessman and civil servant (1904–1980)

The Honourable Sir Maurice Bridgeman KBE KStJ
- Bridgeman in 1963
- Born: Maurice Richard Bridgeman; 26 January 1904; London, England
- Died: 18 May 1980 (aged 76); London, England
- Education: Eton College; Trinity College, Cambridge
- Spouse: Diana Mary Erica Wilson (m. 1933; died 1979)
- Parents: William Bridgeman (father); Caroline Parker (mother)
- Relatives: Geoffrey Bridgeman (brother); Robert Bridgeman (brother); Tessa Bridgeman (daughter)

4th Chairman of BP
- In office 1975–1981
- Preceded by: Sir Neville Gass
- Succeeded by: Sir Eric Drake

Sir Maurice Richard Bridgeman KBE KStJ (26 January 1904 – 18 June 1980) was an English oilman. Bridgeman was the fourth chairman of the board of BP, serving from 1960 to 1969.

== Biography ==
Bridgeman was the third son of the William Bridgeman, 1st Viscount Bridgeman, and Caroline, Viscountess Bridgeman, DBE (née Parker), and younger brother of the 2nd Viscount. He was educated at Eton College, Berkshire and at Trinity College, Cambridge.

In 1939, Bridgeman was petroleum advisor to the Ministry of Economic Warfare, and, from 1944–46, as Principal Assistant Secretary to the Ministry of Fuel & Power. From 1960-69, he was chairman of BP. Bridgeman was honoured as a Commander of the Order of the British Empire in 1946 and later as a Knight Commander (KBE) in 1964. He was also a Knight of the Most Venerable Order of the Hospital of St John of Jerusalem.

== Family ==
Bridgeman married Diana Mary Erica Wilson, daughter of metal broker Humphrey Minto Wilson, on 23 February 1933. They had four daughters (Erica Jane Bridgeman, b. 20 April 1934; Teresa Anne Bridgeman, 25 October 1937 - 25 May 2019; Elizabeth Caroline Bridgeman, b. 15 March 1944; Rachel Diana Bridgeman, b. 9 March 1947).

== Death ==
Bridgeman died on 18 June 1980, aged 76.
