= Tessa Bridgeman =

British charity executive (1937–2019)

- Born: 1937
- Died: 25 May 2019 (aged 81–82); Shepherd's Bush
- Awards: Commander of the Order of the British Empire (1998)

Tessa Bridgeman CBE (1937–2019) was a British charity executive. She was associated with St Michael's Fellowship and Barnardo's. She handled the re-targeting of the Baring Foundation after the collapse of Barings Bank where her husband chaired the board.

== Life ==
Bridgeman was born in 1937. Her parents were Diana Mary Erica (born Wilson) and Maurice Bridgeman who had married four years before. Her father worked for an oil company until the war started when he became a civil servant. She had an elder sister Erica Jane Bridgeman and in time she had two younger sisters Elizabeth Caroline Bridgeman and Rachel Diana Bridgeman who were born in 1944 and 1947.

She was sent to a small private school before she went to Cheltenham Ladies’ College. She did not go on to higher education and she left school when she was sixteen. She learned French and Italian and went to work abroad until she was a debutante. She worked in Britain until she married Peter Baring in 1960. He had graduated from Cambridge University and he had joined Baring Brothers & Co. the year before.

She continued her education and she took a sociology degree at the Polytechnic of Central London after she had gained three A levels by correspondence. She went on to work with charities including a long association with St Michael's Fellowship. She joined the board of Barnardo's and in 1987 she became the chair of their board until 1993.

In 1989 she was involved with the creation of the Association of Charitable Foundations which garnered a lot of interest but a major concern was whether it would be helpful.

In 1995 the bank where her husband worked collapsed. She was involved with the Baring Foundation and it funding came from the now bankrupt bank. She successfully took on the task of down-sizing the foundation to refocus its role. Her husband had been chair of the bank and he retired to an estate in Wiltshire.

She and her husband were living in their home in Shepherd's Bush when she died on 25 May 2019. Her husband and three sons survived her.
