= Art Authority =

Art education company

Art Authority is a company that produces and manages virtual art museum apps for Apple devices. The apps present art pieces within a virtual interface. The company originated from an art education app initially developed for macOS and iOS and is now available on the iPad, iPhone, Apple TV, Mac, and Apple Vision Pro. The apps were designed for university and K–12 education. Open Door Networks Inc. and Project A Inc. designed and managed the Art Authority apps between 2010 and 2016. Following 2016, the Art Authority apps became the company Art Authority LLC, independent of the two previous companies.

The apps include databases of 100,000 works of art, over 1,500 artists, and over 1000 museums and other art locations.

== Promotion and use ==
In 2010, Seton Hill University announced the use of Art Authority on iPads for art history classes. All full-time freshmen, as well as other students who wanted to opt in, could receive an iPad beginning in the fall 2010 semester. The intent was that the university's deal with Open Door Networks would provide exposure for the app’s developers and a supplemental tool for educating art students.

== Acquisitions and partnerships ==
A partnership with Bridgeman Images, which enabled users to order reproductions of works from the apps, was announced on May 30, 2012. It was implemented as Prints on Demand on September 25, 2012. In August 2016, Art Authority acquired the digital portfolio from 1000museums.com, a website that sells authentic reproduction art prints. In April 2023, the owners of Art Authority and 1000museums announced that they had acquired Museum Store Products (MSP). 1000museums serves as the Art Authority apps' gift shop.

== History ==
Open Door Networks. Inc. released the iEnvision iPhone app in 2008. Two years later, the company launched its iPad app, Art Authority, in 2010. In 2012, Exploring Art with Art Authority, an e-book companion to the app, was released. In 2016, the Art Authority LLC was formed. In 2024, the Art Authority Museum App for Apple Vision Pro was released.

== Founder ==
After helping design the AppleTalk network system for the original Macintosh computer and producing the Apple Internet Router, Alan Oppenheimer founded the Art Authority Museum and created the Art Authority apps.
