= Charles Bridgeman (cricketer) =

English barrister and cricketer (1852–1933)

Charles George Orlando Bridgeman
Personal information
- Born: 13 July 1852; Wells, Somerset
- Died: 19 December 1933 (aged 81); St John's Wood, London
- Source: Cricinfo, 10 April 2017

Charles George Orlando Bridgeman (13 July 1852 – 19 December 1933) was an English barrister and historian. He edited the Transactions of the Shropshire Archaeological and Historical Society.

The son of the Rev. George Thomas Orlando Bridgeman, he was educated at Harrow School and Trinity College, Cambridge. He was called to the bar in 1876. He played three first-class matches for Cambridge University Cricket Club between 1872 and 1874.

== Selected works ==
- Earnest R. O. Bridgeman; Bridgeman, Charles George Orlando (1902). "The sequestration papers of Sir Orlando Bridgeman". Transactions of the Shropshire Archaeological and Historical Society: 1–64. ISSN 0143-5175. Wikidata Q96182811.
- Bridgeman, Charles George Orlando (1913). "The Devolution of the Manor of Edgmond in the Fourteenth and following centuries" (PDF). Transactions of the Shropshire Archaeological and Historical Society. 36 (1): 57–108. ISSN 0143-5175. Wikidata Q96182058.
- Bridgeman, Charles George Orlando (1914). "The Devolution of the Sussex Manors formerly belonging to the Earls of Warenne and Surrey". Sussex Archaeological Collections. 56: 54. ISSN 0143-8204. Wikidata Q56359598.
- Bridgeman, Charles George Orlando (1915). "The Sussex Manors of the Earls of Warenne". Sussex Archaeological Collections. 57: 185. ISSN 0143-8204. Wikidata Q56359595.
- Bridgeman, Charles George Orlando (1923). "Cuckfield Park Enclosure". Sussex Archaeological Collections. 64: 197. ISSN 0143-8204. Wikidata Q56359591.

== See also ==
- List of Cambridge University Cricket Club players
