= Bridgeman Images =

International picture library

- Established: 1972
- Location: New York, London, Paris, Berlin
- Type: Picture library
- Website: www.BridgemanImages.com

Bridgeman Images, based in New York, London, Paris and Berlin, provides one of the largest archives for reproductions of works of art in the world. Bridgeman Art Library was founded in 1972 by Harriet Bridgeman and changed its name in 2014. The Bridgeman Art Library works with art galleries and museums to gather images and footage for licensing.

== History ==
Harriet Bridgeman was hired at 23 by Sir John Rothenstein to launch a UK version of the Italian journal I Maestri del Colore. She discovered that gathering pictures of artworks was complicated and launched Bridgeman Art Library in 1972.

In 1998, the company was involved in the case Bridgeman Art Library v. Corel Corp., in which the United States District Court for the Southern District of New York ruled that exact photographic copies of two-dimensional works in the public domain cannot be copyrighted, even if making the image takes considerable effort, because the resulting works lack originality. During the Royal Academy's 1998 exhibition Art Treasures of England: the Regional Collections, 98% of the pieces exhibited came from Bridgeman Art Library.

In 2007, Harriet Bridgeman restructured the company to pave the way for her succession. In 2012, Bridgeman Art Library started to represent the British Council Collection. In 2014, the company officially changed its name from Bridgeman Art Library to Bridgeman Images. In April 2015, Bridgeman Images acquired the French photo archives company Rue des Archives.

== Activities ==
Bridgeman Images is a company that represents museums, art collections and artists throughout the world by providing a central source of fine art and photography for image users (300,000 artworks and 750,000 historical photographs). The company provides a search engine to query its inventory.

Bridgeman also provides customers with reproduction licensing and offers advice on how to clear artist's copyright, if additional permission is needed. Copyright holders receive remuneration in the form of half the reproduction fee paid by the customer. As well as supplying images to consumers, Bridgeman works with copyright holders to create high quality reproductions of artists' works using the latest imaging technology. These reproductions can be ordered through various websites and apps such as Art Authority. Over 500 new images are added to the Bridgeman archive each week. Museums represented in the archive include the British Museum; the British Library; the National Galleries of Scotland, Sweden and South Africa; the Hamburg Kunsthalle; and the Barnes Foundation.

== See also ==
- List of online image archives
