= Robert Bridgeman, 2nd Viscount Bridgeman =

British Army officer and peer (1896–1982)

Major-General The Right Honourable The Viscount Bridgeman KBE CB DSO MC JP
- Viscount Bridgeman in 1937

Member of the House of Lords Lord Temporal
- In office 15 August 1935 – 17 November 1982; Hereditary peerage
- Preceded by: The 1st Viscount Bridgeman
- Succeeded by: The 3rd Viscount Bridgeman

Personal details
- Born: 1 April 1896 London, England
- Died: 17 November 1982 (aged 86)
- Parents: William Bridgeman (father); Caroline Parker (mother)
- Relatives: Geoffrey Bridgeman (brother); Maurice Bridgeman (brother)
- Education: Eton College

Military service
- Allegiance: United Kingdom
- Branch/service: British Army
- Years of service: 1914–1951
- Rank: Major-General
- Unit: Rifle Brigade (The Prince Consort's Own)
- Commands: 145th Infantry Brigade (1940)
- Battles/wars: First World War; Second World War
- Awards: Knight Commander of the Order of the British Empire; Companion of the Order of the Bath; Distinguished Service Order; Military Cross; Mentioned in despatches

Major-General Robert Clive Bridgeman, 2nd Viscount Bridgeman, KBE, CB, DSO, MC, JP (1 April 1896 – 17 November 1982), styled The Honourable Robert Bridgeman between 1929 and 1935, was a British Army officer and peer.

== Background ==
Born in London and baptised at St Paul's Cathedral, he was the son of William Bridgeman, 1st Viscount Bridgeman, and his wife Caroline Beatrix Parker, daughter of Honourable Cecil Thomas Parker. His youngest brother was Maurice Bridgeman. He was educated at Eton College and in 1935, he succeeded his father as viscount.

== Military career ==
=== First World War ===
Bridgeman became 2nd lieutenant in the Rifle Brigade (Prince Consort's Own) in 1914 and served during the First World War. He was promoted to lieutenant in 1916, and received the Military Cross in the next year.

For conspicuous gallantry and devotion to duty, in so skilfully training and-leading his company in an attack as to inflict heavy casualties upon the enemy with hardly any personal losses. He afterwards displayed great resource in keeping his headquarters informed of the situation, in spite of heavy hostile barrage, during which he was wounded, but remained at his post, showing a fine example to all ranks.

After the war, he was private secretary to his father in 1918 and became captain in 1921. He attended the Staff College, Camberley from 1927 to 1928. His fellow students included Oliver Leese, Philip Christison, Eric Hayes, Evelyn Barker, Eric Dorman-Smith, John Whiteley, Ronald Penney, Clement West, Wilfred Lloyd, Stanley Kirby and John Hawkesworth. He was then transferred as a brevet-major to the 7th Infantry Brigade in 1932. Bridgeman held this command until 1934 and became brevet lieutenant-colonel in the following year, having been simultaneously appointed to the War Office as a general staff officer.

=== Second World War ===
Bridgeman retired on half-pay in 1937, however was reactivated to the British Expeditionary Force (BEF) with the outbreak of the Second World War. He was decorated with the Distinguished Service Order (DSO) in July 1940 after the Dunkirk evacuation and commanded the 145th Infantry Brigade, part of the 48th (South Midland) Infantry Division, a Territorial Army (TA) formation, recently returned from Dunkirk. He became first deputy director, then director-general, of the Home Guard as well as the TA in the next year. In 1942, Bridgeman was promoted to colonel and temporary major-general. He was nominated deputy adjutant-general to the War Office in 1944, a post he held until the end of the war. In 1951, Bridgeman retired, having been granted the rank of honorary major-general.

=== Later years ===
Bridgeman was appointed a Companion of the Order of the Bath in the New Year's Honours 1944, and became honorary colonel of the 4th Battalion, King's Shropshire Light Infantry in 1949. Bridgeman served as treasurer of the Royal Salop Infirmary at Shrewsbury in 1946, and 1948 when the hospital was taken over by the National Health Service. Having been before already Deputy Lieutenant, he was appointed Lord Lieutenant of Shropshire in 1951. Representing the county also as Justice of the Peace, he held the Lord lieutenancy until 1970. He was appointed a Knight Commander of the Order of the British Empire in 1954, and a Knight of the Most Venerable Order of the Hospital of Saint John of Jerusalem one year later. Bridgeman was president of the West Midland Territorial Army and Volunteer Reserve Association in 1968 and the next year.

== Family ==
Arms of the Viscount Bridgeman

On 12 June 1930, he married Mary Kathleen Lane Fox, second daughter of George Lane-Fox, 1st Baron Bingley, and had by her three daughters.

He was succeeded in the viscountcy by his nephew Robin Bridgeman, the son of his younger brother Geoffrey. Lady Bridgeman died in 1981. He died on 17 November 1982 aged eighty-six, and was buried in the churchyard at Hope near Minsterley, Shropshire. His youngest daughter, Mary Selina Bayliss, went on to serve as both High Sheriff of Berkshire and Lord Lieutenant of Berkshire.

== Bibliography ==
- Mead, Richard (2007). Churchill's Lions: a biographical guide to the key British generals of World War II. Stroud (UK): Spellmount. ISBN 978-1-86227-431-0.
- Smart, Nick (2005). Biographical Dictionary of British Generals of the Second World War. Barnesley: Pen & Sword. ISBN 1844150496.

Honorary titles
Preceded by The Earl of Powis	Lord Lieutenant of Shropshire; 1951–1970	Succeeded by Arthur Heywood-Lonsdale
Peerage of the United Kingdom
Preceded by William Bridgeman	Viscount Bridgeman; 1935–1982	Succeeded by Robin Bridgeman
