= William Bridgeman, 1st Viscount Bridgeman =

British politician and peer (1864–1935)

The Right Honourable The Viscount Bridgeman PC JP DL
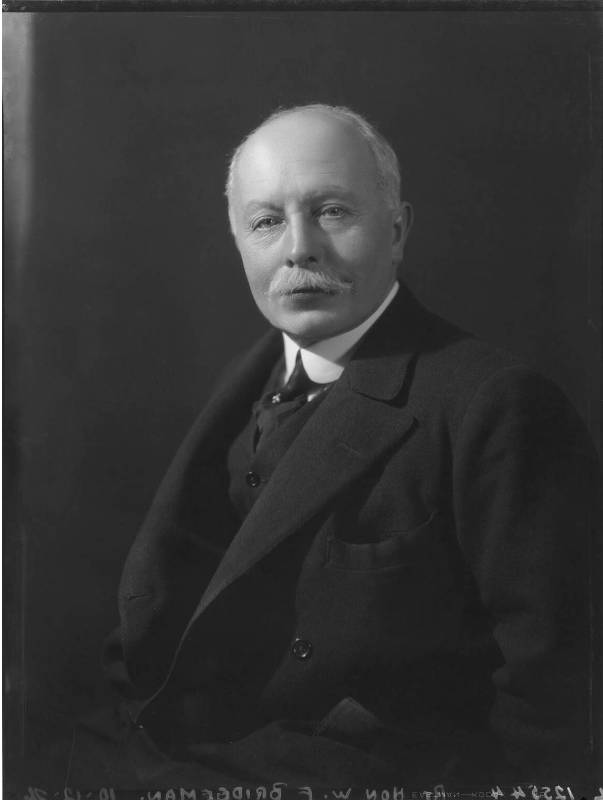
- Bridgeman in 1926

First Lord of the Admiralty
- In office 6 November 1924 – 4 June 1929
- Monarch: George V
- Prime Minister: Stanley Baldwin
- Preceded by: The Viscount Chelmsford
- Succeeded by: A. V. Alexander

Home Secretary
- In office 25 October 1922 – 22 January 1924
- Monarch: George V
- Prime Minister: Bonar Law; Stanley Baldwin
- Preceded by: Edward Shortt
- Succeeded by: Arthur Henderson

Secretary for Mines
- In office 22 August 1920 – 25 October 1922
- Monarch: George V
- Prime Minister: David Lloyd George
- Preceded by: Office established
- Succeeded by: George Lane-Fox

Parliamentary Secretary to the Board of Trade
- In office 10 January 1919 – 22 August 1920
- Monarch: George V
- Prime Minister: David Lloyd George
- Preceded by: George Wardle
- Succeeded by: Sir Philip Lloyd-Greame

Parliamentary Secretary to the Ministry of Labour
- In office 22 December 1916 – 10 January 1919
- Monarch: George V
- Prime Minister: David Lloyd George
- Preceded by: Office established
- Succeeded by: George Wardle

Lord Commissioner of the Treasury
- In office 30 May 1915 – 5 December 1916
- Monarch: George V
- Prime Minister: H. H. Asquith
- Preceded by: Cecil Beck
- Succeeded by: James Hope

Member of the House of Lords Lord Temporal
- In office 18 June 1929 – 14 August 1935; Hereditary peerage
- Preceded by: Peerage created
- Succeeded by: The 2nd Viscount Bridgeman

Member of Parliament for Oswestry
- In office 8 February 1906 – 10 May 1929
- Preceded by: Allan Heywood Bright
- Succeeded by: Bertie Leighton

Personal details
- Born: 31 December 1864 London
- Died: 14 August 1935 (aged 70) Leigh Manor, Shropshire
- Party: Conservative
- Spouse: Caroline Parker (d. 1961)
- Education: Trinity College, Cambridge

William Clive Bridgeman, 1st Viscount Bridgeman, PC, JP, DL (31 December 1864 – 14 August 1935) was a British Conservative politician and peer. He notably served as Home Secretary between 1922 and 1924. He was also an active cricketer.

== Background and education ==
Bridgeman was born in London, United Kingdom, the son of Reverend Hon. John Robert Orlando Bridgeman, third son of the 2nd Earl of Bradford, and Marianne Caroline Clive. He was educated at Eton and Trinity College, Cambridge. While there he was secretary of the Pitt Club.

== Cricketing ==
While at Cambridge, he played first-class cricket for the Cambridge University Cricket Club and was a Blue (against Oxford) in 1884. Below first-class he played at county level for Staffordshire and Shropshire, appearing for the latter 31 times between 1884 and 1903, achieving a century in one match with 159 runs, while playing at club level for Worthen in Shropshire and Blymhill in Staffordshire. He also played for the I Zingari and Marylebone Cricket Club (M.C.C.) teams, and 1931 he served as President of the M.C.C.

== Political career ==
After a stint as an assistant master at Eton, Bridgeman entered a career in politics early, becoming assistant private secretary to Lord Knutsford, the Colonial Secretary (1889–1892), and then to Sir Michael Hicks-Beach, the Chancellor of the Exchequer from 1895 to 1897. At two general elections he unsuccessfully contested the seats of North Worcestershire in 1892 and Mid Derbyshire in 1895. In 1897 he became a member of the London School Board, and in 1904 he was elected to the London County Council. In 1906 he was elected as a member of parliament (MP) for Oswestry (a seat he previously contested at a by-election in 1904), staying in this seat until his retirement in 1929. In 1909 he was appointed a member of a Royal Commission on the selection of Justices of the Peace.

In 1911, Bridgeman became an opposition whip, and became a government whip in the Asquith coalition government in 1915. From 1915 to 1916, he was Lord of the Treasury and Assistant Director of the War Trade Department. With the creation of Lloyd George's coalition in 1916, Bridgeman became Parliamentary Secretary to the Ministry of Labour until 1919, and then Parliamentary Secretary to the Board of Trade in 1919 and 1920, and then served as Secretary for Mines from 1920 to 1922. In these roles, Bridgeman became a devoted opponent of strikes and socialism, although he came to admire more moderate trade unionists. He was appointed to the Privy Council on 13 October 1920.

In October 1922, Bridgeman was one of the leaders of the Conservative revolt against the coalition's leadership, and he became Home Secretary in the new Conservative governments of Bonar Law and Stanley Baldwin from 1922 until January 1924. He became notorious for refusing clemency to death-condemned Edith Thompson in the Thompson-Bywaters murder case, and for deporting over 100 suspected I.R.A. members - a measure which was ruled 'criminal' by the Court of Appeal and forced Bridgeman to take out an Act of Indemnity to protect the government from further legal action.

His reputation for harshness and resolve continued in his time as First Lord of the Admiralty from November 1924 to June 1929. In the Admiralty, he ordered resumed construction of the Singapore Naval Base and threatened to resign to obtain the building of new warships in the July 1925 'cruiser crisis'. In 1927 he headed the British delegation to the 1927 Geneva Naval Conference, resisting demands for 'parity' in cruisers that would have reduced the Royal Navy fleet, although this stance caused the failure of the conference and a deterioration in Anglo-American relations. Throughout, he was one of Conservative leader Stanley Baldwin's closest allies.

While outside his Admiralty brief, Bridgeman introduced, on behalf of the Archbishop of Canterbury, Randall Davidson, a Bill for a revised version of the Church of England Prayer Book in the House of Commons in 1927, following its successful passing in the House of Lords. Bridgeman made a listless speech that did not impress MPs. Opposing, William Joynson-Hicks, the then Home Secretary, spoke vehemently, maintaining that the new Prayer-book opened the door to Romish practices. Davidson privately wrote of Bridgeman's speech, "He absolutely muffed it. It was a poor speech with no knowledge and no fire"; The Commons rejected the bill by 238 votes to 205.

Bridgeman retired from the Commons in 1929, and on 18 June that year was created Viscount Bridgeman, of Leigh in the County of Shropshire.

== Later life ==
In his later years, he served as chairman of various commissions and committees, as well as, briefly, Chairman of the BBC. He became Justice of Peace and Deputy Lieutenant of Shropshire, and received an Honorary Doctor of Law from the University of Cambridge in 1930. In 1929 he was made a Fellow of Eton College and also served as chairman of the governors of Shrewsbury School. In 1927, towards the end of his time as an M.P., he served as treasurer of the Royal Salop Infirmary in Shrewsbury.

== Family ==
Arms of Viscount Bridgeman

Lord Bridgeman married Caroline Beatrix Parker, daughter of Hon. Cecil Thomas Parker and Rosamond Esther Harriet Longley, daughter of the Most Rev. Charles Thomas Longley, Archbishop of Canterbury, in Eccleston, Chester, on 30 April 1895. They had four children:

- Robert Bridgeman, 2nd Viscount Bridgeman (1896–1982)
- Brigadier Hon. Geoffrey Bridgeman (1898–1974)
- Anne Bridgeman (1900–1900)
- Hon. Sir Maurice Bridgeman (1904–1980)

Lord Bridgeman died in Leigh Manor, Shropshire, on 14 August 1935, aged 70, and was buried in the churchyard at Hope near Minsterley three days later. The Viscountess Bridgeman died in December 1961.

== Sources ==
- Williamson, Philip. The modernisation of conservative politics: the diaries and letters of William Bridgeman 1904-1935 (Historians' Press, 1988).

Parliament of the United Kingdom
| Preceded by Allan Heywood Bright | Member of Parliament for Oswestry; 1906–1929 | Succeeded by Bertie Leighton |
Political offices
| Preceded by Edward Shortt | Home Secretary; 1922–1924 | Succeeded by Arthur Henderson |
| Preceded by The Viscount Chelmsford | First Lord of the Admiralty; 1924–1929 | Succeeded by A. V. Alexander |
Media offices
| Preceded by John Henry Whitley | Chairman of the BBC Board of Governors; 1935 | Succeeded by Ronald Collet Norman |
Peerage of the United Kingdom
| New creation | Viscount Bridgeman; 1929–1935 | Succeeded by Robert Clive Bridgeman |
