= Flora Yukhnovich =

British painter

Flora Yukhnovich (born 1990) is a British painter. Yukhnovich is known for her contemporary interpretation of the Rococo painting style. The artist discussed her interest in the concept of taste and how personal objects and patterns can reveal aspects of one's interior self in a 2020 interview with DATEAGLE ART. She also mentioned the idea that people may try to cultivate certain tastes in order to fit in or impress others, and that some tastes may be hidden due to shame. The artist finds the Rococo movement particularly interesting in this regard.

Born in Norwich, she did a Diploma and Post-Diploma in Portraiture at Heatherley School of Fine Art in 2010–13, and an MA Fine Art at the City & Guilds of London Art School in 2016–17.

== Career ==
In 2017, Yukhovnich held a solo show at Parafin Gallery, London. In 2019 she had a solo exhibition at Victoria Miro gallery, Venice. In addition to Victoria Miro, Hauser & Wirth has been representing Yukhovnich since 2023.

Yukhnovich's paintings have commanded high prices at auction. Her third painting to be put up for auction, Pretty Little Thing, sold for US$1.2 million in 2021. In October 2021 her painting I'll Have What She's Having sold for £2.3m at auction.

Her painting Imagination, Life is Your Creation is held by the United Kingdom Government Art Collection.

In early 2022, Rishi Sunak, before he was elected British prime minister, had one of Yukhnovich's paintings in his Downing Street home.

== Exhibitions (selection) ==
- Flora Yukhnovich's Four Seasons. The Frick Collection, September 3, 2025 to March 9, 2026.
- Flora Yukhnovich. Into the Woods, (18 September 2024 - 19 January 2025), Ordrupgaard, Charlottenlund Denmark.
- Flora Yukhnovich and François Boucher: The Language of the Rococo, (5 June - 3 November 2024),The Wallace Collection, London UK.
- Ashmolean NOW: Flora Yukhnovich x Daniel Crews-Chubb, (8 July 2023 – 14 January 2024), Ashmolean Museum, Oxford UK.
