= Geoffrey Bridgeman =

British soldier and ophthalmologist (1898–1974)

Brigadier The Honourable Geoffrey John Orlando Bridgeman MC (3 July 1898 – 15 October 1974), styled The Honourable from 1929, was a British soldier and ophthalmologist.

== Background and education ==
Born at Harley Street in London, Bridgeman was the second son of William Bridgeman, 1st Viscount Bridgeman. His mother Caroline was the daughter of Cecil Thomas Parker, younger son of Thomas Parker, 6th Earl of Macclesfield. Bridgeman's younger brother Maurice was a businessman and civil servant. He was educated at Eton College and went then to Trinity College, Cambridge. From 1917 he fought in the First World War, being commissioned into the Royal Field Artillery. In 1918 he was decorated with the Military Cross and after the end of the war retired as lieutenant. He resumed his studies in Cambridge and after winning a classical exhibition, Bridgeman read natural sciences and graduated with a Bachelor of Arts in 1920. Six years later at St George's Hospital he obtained a Bachelor of Medicine and in 1928 he received further a Bachelor of Medicine and a Bachelor of Surgery.

== Career ==
Bridgeman worked first as chief clinical assistant at Moorfields Eye Hospital and then as ophthalmic surgeon at East Ham Memorial Hospital. Subsequently, he returned to St George's and became employed at the Western Ophthalmic Hospital. During the Second World War, he served in the Royal Army Medical Corps and gained the rank of brigadier. Bridgeman was attached to the Middle East and came afterwards to India. He was an honorary consultant ophthalmologist at the India and Burma Office and was elected a fellow of the Royal College of Surgeons of England in 1933. Bridgeman held membership of the Ophthalmological Society of the United Kingdom and of the British Medical Association.

== Family ==
On 3 July 1929, Bridgeman married Mary Meriel Gertrude Talbot (18 January 1903 – 5 July 1974), daughter of the Rt. Hon. Sir George John Talbot and Gertrude Harriot Cator. The couple had three children, one son and two daughters:

- Robin John Orlando Bridgeman, 3rd Viscount Bridgeman (b. 5 December 1930).
- Helena Mary Bridgeman (b. 2 November 1932), married firstly on 18 July 1953 and divorced in 1963 The Hon. Paul Asquith (4 January 1927 – 1984), son of Cyril Asquith, Baron Asquith of Bishopstone, and Anne Stephanie Pollock, and married secondly James Francis Leslie Bayley, son of Thomas Eliot Bayley of Edinburgh, Midlothian, on 15 July 1963, living in 2003 at Wassall House, Rolvenden, Kent.
- Daphne Bridgeman (b. 9 April 1940), married on 4 December 1965 as his second wife William Howard Clive Montgomery of Rosemount House and of Greyabbey, son of Major Hugh Edward Montgomery of Greyabbey, County Down, Deputy Lieutenant (DL), living in 2003 at Greyabbey, Newtownards, County Down.

Mary died in 1961 and Bridgeman survived her until 1974. His son Robin succeeded his uncle Robert Bridgeman, 2nd Viscount Bridgeman, in his title in 1982. His granddaughter is actress Flora Montgomery.
