= Viscount Bridgeman =

Viscountcy in the Peerage of the United Kingdom

- Arms of Bridgeman: Sable, ten Plates, four, three, two and one, on a Chief Argent, a Lion passant Ermines. Crest: A Demi-Lion rampant Argent, holding between the paws a Wreath of Laurel proper. Supporters: On either side a Lion guardant Gules pellettée.
- Creation date: 18 June 1929
- Created by: George V
- Peerage: United Kingdom
- First holder: William Bridgeman, 1st Viscount Bridgeman
- Present holder: Luke Bridgeman, 4th Viscount Bridgeman
- Heir apparent: Valentine Henry Ralph Orlando Bridgeman
- Remainder to: the 1st Viscount's heirs male of the body lawfully begotten.
- Seat: Watley House
- Motto: NEC TEMERE NEC TIMIDE (Neither rashly nor timidly)

Viscount Bridgeman, of Leigh in the County of Shropshire, is a title in the Peerage of the United Kingdom. It was created in 1929 for the Conservative politician William Bridgeman, who had previously served as Home Secretary and First Lord of the Admiralty. He was the son of Reverend John Robert Orlando Bridgeman, third son of George Bridgeman, 2nd Earl of Bradford. His son, the second Viscount, served as Lord Lieutenant of Shropshire from 1951 to 1969. As of 2026 the title was held by the latter's great-nephew, the fourth Viscount, who successed his father in that year. The third Viscount was one of the ninety elected hereditary peers that remained in the House of Lords after the passing of the House of Lords Act 1999, and sat as a Conservative until his death.

As descendants of the 2nd Earl of Bradford, the Bridgeman viscounts are in the remainder for that earldom.

== Family seat ==
The family seat is Watley House, near Winchester, Hampshire.

== Coat of arms ==
The heraldic blazon for the coat of arms of the barony is: Sable, ten plates, four, three, two, and one, on a chief argent a lion passant ermines.

== Viscounts Bridgeman (1929) ==
- William Clive Bridgeman, 1st Viscount Bridgeman (1864–1935)
- Robert Clive Bridgeman, 2nd Viscount Bridgeman (1896–1982)
- Robin John Orlando Bridgeman, 3rd Viscount Bridgeman (1930–2026)
  - Hon. William Orlando Caspar Bridgeman (1968–2001)
- Luke Robinson Orlando Bridgeman, 4th Viscount Bridgeman (born 1971)

The heir apparent is the present holder's son, the Hon. Valentine Henry Ralph Orlando Bridgeman (born 1999).

== See also ==
- Earl of Bradford
- Bridgeman baronets
