= Norfolk County Council elections =

Local government elections in Norfolk, England

Norfolk County Council in England is elected every four years. Since the last boundary changes in 2005, 84 councillors have been elected from 84 wards.

== Council composition ==
Year	Con	Lab	LD (Note: Includes totals for the predecessors of the Liberal Democrats, the Liberal Party and SDP (both of which participated in the Alliance).)	Grn	UKIP	Ref	GYF	Independents & Others	Council control after election
Local government reorganisation; council established (83 seats)
1973	51	27	0	–	–	–	–	5 (Note: Including 1 Independent Conservative)	Conservative
1977	70	13	0	0	–	–	–	0	Conservative
1981	51	27	4	0	–	–	–	1	Conservative
New division boundaries; seats increased from 83 to 84
1985	44	25	15	0	–	–	–	0	Conservative
1989	47	28	9	0	–	–	–	0	Conservative
1993	34	32	16	0	–	–	–	2	No overall control
1997	36	34	13	0	0	–	–	1	No overall control
2001	48	26	10	0	0	–	–	0	Conservative
New division boundaries; seats remain at 84
2005	46	22	14	2	0	–	–	0	Conservative
2009	60	3	13	7	1	–	–	0	Conservative
2013	40	14	10	4	15	–	–	1	No overall control
2017	55	17	11	0	0	–	–	1	Conservative
2021	58	12	8	3	0	0	–	3	Conservative
New division boundaries; seats remain at 84
2026 (Note: Delayed from 2025.)	8	1	13	12	–	40	9	1	No overall control

== County result maps ==
2005 results map

2009 results map

2013 results map

2017 results map

2021 results map

2026 results map

== By-election results 1997 to present day ==
=== 1997–2001 ===
University by-election 20 November 1997
Party	Candidate	Votes	%	±%
Labour		808	43.0	+1.0
Liberal Democrats		796	42.4	+2.5
Conservative		275	14.6	−0.2
Majority		12	0.6	
Turnout		1,879	33.3	
Labour hold		Swing		

Lakenham by-election 6 May 1999
Party	Candidate	Votes	%	±%
Labour		803	53.5	+1.2
Liberal Democrats		402	26.8	−2.2
Conservative		296	19.7	+2.5
Majority		401	26.7	
Turnout		1,501		
Labour hold		Swing		

Holt by-election 28 October 1999
Party	Candidate	Votes	%	±%
Liberal Democrats		1,848	55.4	+14.5
Conservative		1,358	40.7	+0.7
Labour		130	3.9	−15.2
Majority		490	14.7	
Turnout		3,336	44.0	
Liberal Democrats hold		Swing		

Northgate by-election 15 June 2000
Party	Candidate	Votes	%	±%
Labour		575	48.4	−8.3
Conservative		558	47.0	+15.5
Liberal Democrats		55	4.6	−7.2
Majority		17	1.4	
Turnout		1,188	27.0	
Labour hold		Swing		

=== 2001–2005 ===
Wymondham by-election 2 August 2001
Party	Candidate	Votes	%	±%
Liberal Democrats		1,736	49.2	+13.0
Conservative		1,734	49.1	+9.1
Green		57	1.6	−0.7
Majority		2	0.1	
Turnout		3,527	35.7	
Liberal Democrats gain from Conservative		Swing		

Mousehold by-election 26 September 2002
Party	Candidate	Votes	%	±%
Labour		807	51.6	+7.4
Liberal Democrats	Paul Kendrick	461	29.5	−3.7
Conservative		132	8.4	−8.2
Independent		82	5.2	+5.2
Green		81	5.2	−0.7
Majority		346	22.1	
Turnout		1,563		
Labour hold		Swing		

Downham Market by-election 16 December 2004
Party	Candidate	Votes	%	±%
Conservative	Shelagh Hutson	1,301	68.3	+13.0
Labour		223	11.7	−20.4
UKIP	Michael Stone	191	10.1	+10.1
Liberal Democrats	John Nicholas-Letch	190	10.0	+0.2
Majority		1,078	56.6	
Turnout		1,905	21.3	
Conservative hold		Swing		

=== 2005–2009 ===
Town Close by-election 26 May 2005
Party	Candidate	Votes	%	±%
Green	Christopher Hull	1,151	36.1	+30.9
Liberal Democrats	Moira Toye	958	30.1	−11.7
Labour	David Fullman	606	19.0	−14.7
Conservative	John Wyatt	470	14.8	−4.5
Majority		193	6.0	
Turnout		3,185	41.0	
Green gain from Liberal Democrats		Swing		

Humbleyard by-election 4 May 2006
Party	Candidate	Votes	%	±%
Conservative	Judith Virgo	1,725	47.7	+1.6
Liberal Democrats	Jacqueline Sutton	1,474	40.7	+7.4
Green	Richard Bearman	239	6.6	+0.7
Labour	John Cowan	180	5.0	−9.7
Majority		251	7.0	
Turnout		3,618		
Conservative hold		Swing		

Clavering by-election 3 May 2007
Party	Candidate	Votes	%	±%
Conservative	Tony Tomkinson	1,743	46.0	+5.2
Liberal Democrats	Bronwen Jenkins	1,347	35.6	−8.1
Green	Paul Fitzgerald	378	9.8	+2.2
Labour	Jeanette Fowler	324	8.6	+8.6
Majority		396	10.4	
Turnout		3,787	45.1	
Conservative gain from Liberal Democrats		Swing		

Aylsham by-election 22 November 2007
Party	Candidate	Votes	%	±%
Liberal Democrats	David Harrison	1,696	60.6	+23.2
Conservative	Ian Graham	854	30.5	−6.4
Labour	Terry Glasspoole	177	6.3	−19.4
UKIP	Vandra Ahlstrom	71	2.5	+2.5
Majority		842	30.1	
Turnout		2,798	39.0	
Liberal Democrats hold		Swing		

=== 2009–2013 ===
Humbleyard by-election 13 January 2011
Party	Candidate	Votes	%	±%
Conservative	Judith Virgo	1,015	46.6	−5.4
Liberal Democrats	Jacqueline Sutton	438	20.1	−4.5
Labour	Marian Chapman	424	19.5	+11.4
Green	Janet Kitchener	170	7.8	−7.7
UKIP	Richard Coke	133	6.1	+6.1
Majority		577	26.5	−0.9
Turnout		2,185	26.1	−20.8
Conservative hold		Swing	−0.5	

Lothingland by-election 5 May 2011
Party	Candidate	Votes	%	±%
Conservative	Barry Stone	1,611	49.0	+3.6
Labour	Trevor Wainwright	1,076	32.7	+10.6
Independent	John Cooper	418	12.7	+12.7
Green	Michael Brackenbury	184	5.6	+5.6
Majority		535	16.3	+3.3
Turnout		3,289		
Conservative hold		Swing	−3.5	

Old Catton by-election 14 July 2011
Party	Candidate	Votes	%	±%
Conservative	Judy Leggett	664	40.6	−8.2
Liberal Democrats	Bob Fowkes	414	25.3	+11.8
Labour Co-op	Chrissie Rumsby	377	23.0	+12.2
UKIP	Glenn Tingle	107	6.5	−9.7
Green	Jennifer Parkhouse	75	4.6	−6.0
Majority		250	15.3	−617.3
Turnout		1,642	25.7	−12.5
Conservative hold		Swing	−10.0	

Lakenham by-election 24 November 2011
Party	Candidate	Votes	%	±%
Labour Co-op	Susan Whitaker	1,051	43.0	+16.1
Liberal Democrats	David Fairbairn	611	25.0	−6.7
Green	Paul Neale	492	20.1	+7.4
Conservative	Mathew Morris	160	6.5	−6.5
UKIP	Stephen Emmens	133	5.4	−10.3
Majority		440	18.0	+13.1
Turnout		2,455		
Labour Co-op gain from Liberal Democrats		Swing	+11.4	

Clenchwarton and Kings Lynn South by-election 27 September 2012
Party	Candidate	Votes	%	±%
Labour	Alexandra Kampouropoulos	824	45.8	+34.1
Conservative	Paul Foster	424	23.5	−15.7
Liberal Democrats	Kathleen Mayer	282	15.7	−13.1
UKIP	Michael Stone	271	15.0	+15.0
Majority		400	22.2	+11.7
Turnout		1,806	22.5	−12.4
Labour gain from Conservative		Swing	+24.9	

Percentage change is since June 2009.

=== 2013–2017 ===
West Thetford by-election 1 August 2013
Party	Candidate	Votes	%	±%
Labour Co-op	Terry Jermy	1,071	45.2	+9.8
UKIP	John Newton	900	38.0	+2.6
Conservative	Tristan Ashby	282	11.9	−3.5
Independent	Danny Jeffrey	78	3.3	N/A
Green	Sandra Walmsley	40	1.7	−1.1
Majority		171	7.2	
Turnout		2,371	24.6	+0.9
Labour gain from UKIP		Swing	6.2	

Percentage change is since May 2013. The by-election was triggered by the resignation of UKIP Councillor Peter Georgiou, after he admitted to shoplifting and tobacco duty evasion.

North Walsham East by-election 24 October 2013
Party	Candidate	Votes	%	±%
Liberal Democrats	Eric Seward	1,044	40.9	+5.8
UKIP	Lynette Comber	565	22.1	−1.0
Labour	Stephen Burke	442	17.3	−3.9
Conservative	David Oliver	359	14.1	−2.4
Green	Paul Oakes	80	3.1	−0.9
Independent	Graham Jones	61	2.4	N/A
Majority		479	18.8	
Turnout		2,562	29.5	−5.6
Liberal Democrats hold		Swing		

Gorleston St Andrews by-election 16 July 2015
Party	Candidate	Votes	%	±%
Conservative	Graham Plant	876	42.7	+15.3
Labour	Tony Wright	773	37.7	+1.8
UKIP	Adrian Myers	285	13.9	−22.8
Liberal Democrats	Tony Harris	66	3.2	N/A
Green	Harry Webb	51	2.5	N/A
Majority		103	5.0	
Turnout		2,053	27.9	
Conservative gain from UKIP		Swing		

The by-election was triggered by the resignation of Councillor Matthew Smith, who was elected as a member of the UK Independence Party, following his guilty plea to charges of electoral fraud.

Mile Cross by-election 16 July 2015
Party	Candidate	Votes	%	±%
Labour Co-op	Chrissie Rumsby	749	51.8	+7.2
Conservative	Chelsea Bales	279	19.3	+8.7
Green	Richard Edwards	209	14.4	−6.8
UKIP	Michelle Ho	148	10.2	−9.2
Liberal Democrats	Tom Dymoke	62	4.3	+0.1
Majority		470	32.5	+9.2
Turnout		1,452	18.5	−7.6
Labour hold		Swing	−0.8	

Loddon by-election 24 September 2015
Party	Candidate	Votes	%	±%
Conservative	Barry Stone	1,094	57.0	−6.7
Labour Co-op	David Bissonnet	357	18.6	+6.4
Liberal Democrats	Christopher Brown	235	12.3	+7.1
UKIP	Alan Baugh	233	12.1	−6.8
Majority		737	38.4	−6.4
Turnout		1,926	23.2	−21.6
Conservative hold		Swing	−6.6	

South Smallburgh by-election 19 November 2015
Party	Candidate	Votes	%	±%
Liberal Democrats	Alison Bradnock	1,383	56.4	+25.8
Conservative	Paul Rice	697	28.4	+1.0
UKIP	Barry Whitehouse	219	8.9	−17.8
Labour Co-op	David Spencer	103	4.2	−5.3
Green	Anne Filgate	52	2.1	−1.6
Majority		686	28.0	
Turnout		2,456	34.7	−5.4
Liberal Democrats hold		Swing		

Watton by-election 19 November 2015
Party	Candidate	Votes	%	±%
Conservative	Claire Bowes	822	45.6	+18.2
Independent	Keith Gilbert	793	44.0	+20.4
Labour	Joseph Sisto	105	5.8	−5.4
Green	Timothy Birt	81	4.5	+0.3
Majority		29	1.6	
Turnout		1,806	21	
Conservative gain from UKIP		Swing	N/A	

The by-election was triggered by the resignation of Councillor Stan Hebborn, who was elected for the UK Independence Party.

=== 2017–2021 ===
Yare & All Saints by-election 12 July 2018
Party	Candidate	Votes	%	±%
Conservative	Edward Connolly	955	64.8	−8.0
Labour	Harry Clarke	337	22.9	+10.6
Liberal Democrats	Andrew Thorpe	182	12.4	−2.6
Majority		618	41.2	−16.6
Turnout		1,478	19.1	−16.6
Conservative hold		Swing	−9.3	

Wroxham by-election 4 April 2019
Party	Candidate	Votes	%	±%
Conservative	Fran Whymark	922	55.7	−3.2
Liberal Democrats	Stephen Heard	395	23.9	+4.0
Green	Jan Davis	174	10.5	+5.0
Labour	Juila Wheeler	163	9.9	−0.8
Majority		527	31.9	−7.2
Turnout		1,673	20.7	−16.0
Conservative hold		Swing	−3.6	

=== 2021–2026 ===
Gaywood South by-election 29 July 2021
Party	Candidate	Votes	%	±%
Liberal Democrats	Rob Colwell	648	39.3	+28.1
Labour	Micaela Bartrum	561	34.0	−1.6
Conservative	Phil Trask	378	22.9	−25.4
Independent	Robin Talbot	35	2.1	+2.1
UKIP	Michael Stone	28	1.7	−3.2
Majority		87	5.3	
Turnout		1,650		
Liberal Democrats gain from Conservative		Swing		

Gaywood North and Central by-election 1 December 2022
Party	Candidate	Votes	%	±%
Liberal Democrats	David Sayers	364	35.6	+28.5
Labour	Richard Johnson	356	34.8	+1.3
Conservative	Sheila Young	256	25.0	−31.1
Green	Vicky Fairweather	46	4.5	+4.5
Majority		8	0.8	
Turnout		1,022		
Liberal Democrats gain from Conservative		Swing		

Swaffham by-election 4 May 2023
Party	Candidate	Votes	%	±%
Conservative	William Nunn	1,288	50.8	−17.8
Labour	Terry Land	649	25.6	+9.0
Liberal Democrats	Josie Ratcliff	596	23.5	+17.8
Majority		639	25.2	
Turnout		2,533		
Conservative hold		Swing		

West Depwade by-election 13 July 2023
Party	Candidate	Votes	%	±%
Green	Catherine Rowett	663	29.0	+19.6
Conservative	Tony Holden	582	25.4	−18.2
Liberal Democrats	Ian Spratt	409	17.9	+7.4
Independent	Beverley Spratt	405	17.7	−6.0
Labour	Pam Reekie	228	10.0	−2.8
Majority		81	3.5	
Turnout		2,287	24.8	−16.0
Green gain from Conservative		Swing	+18.9	

Freebridge Lynn by-election 3 August 2023
Party	Candidate	Votes	%	±%
Liberal Democrats	John Crofts	669	38.4	+38.4
Conservative	Olivia Morris	539	31.0	−33.7
Green	Andrew de Whalley	418	24.0	+4.3
Labour	Lesley Marriage	115	6.6	−9.0
Majority		130	7.5	
Turnout		1,741		
Liberal Democrats gain from Conservative		Swing		

Freebridge Lynn by-election 12 September 2024
Party	Candidate	Votes	%	±%
Independent	Simon Ring	723	53.8	+53.8
Conservative	Jason Law	454	33.8	+2.8
Labour	Wilf Lambert	167	12.4	+5.8
Majority		269	20.0	
Turnout		1,344		
Independent gain from Liberal Democrats		Swing		

Mancroft by-election 1 May 2025
Party	Candidate	Votes	%	±%
Green	Serene Shibli	1,255	50.3	−1.6
Reform	Karl Catchpole	510	20.4	+20.4
Labour	Josh Horsfall	432	17.3	−15.9
Conservative	Edith Jones	147	5.9	−9.0
Liberal Democrats	Gordon Dean	124	5.0	+5.0
Homeland	Lorna Garner	26	1.0	+1.0
Majority		745	29.9	
Turnout		2,494		
Green hold		Swing		

Marshland North by-election 1 May 2025
Party	Candidate	Votes	%	±%
Reform	Julian Kirk	1,286	54.9	+54.9
Liberal Democrats	Alan Holmes	404	17.3	+17.3
Conservative	Richard Blunt	389	16.6	−41.6
Labour	Matt Hannay	120	5.1	−9.4
Green	Rob Archer	75	3.2	+3.2
Independent	Michael Squire	67	2.9	+2.9
Majority		882	37.7	
Turnout		2,341		
Reform gain from Conservative		Swing		

Thetford West by-election 1 May 2025
Party	Candidate	Votes	%	±%
Reform	David Bick	917	47.9	+47.9
Labour	Terry Land	644	33.6	−23.3
Conservative	Peter Wilkinson	240	12.5	−21.5
Liberal Democrats	Ian Minto	115	6.0	+1.2
Majority		273	14.2	
Turnout		1,916		
Reform gain from Labour		Swing		

=== 2026–2030 ===
Old Catton by-election 16 July 2026
Party	Candidate	Votes	%	±%
Conservative	Antony Little	973	34.6	+8.5
Green	Phoebe Connell	921	32.7	+13.9
Reform	Sue Lawn	561	19.9	−10.1
Labour Co-op	Jake Norman	147	5.2	−10.7
Liberal Democrats	Martin Callam	100	3.6	−5.6
Restore	Hamish Williams	98	3.5	N/A
Monster Raving Loony	His Excellency Freeman	13	0.5	N/A
Majority		52	1.8	−2.1
Turnout		2,813	39.8	−7.9
Registered electors		7,047		
Conservative gain from Reform		Swing		
