= 2005 Norfolk County Council election =

2005 UK local government election

← 2001	5 May 2005	2009 →

All 84 council division seats 43 seats needed for a majority
- Registered: 636,896 (▲2.5%)
- Turnout: 63.7% (▲0.4%)

	First party	Second party	Third party
Party	Conservative	Labour	Liberal Democrats
Last election	48 seats, 40.2%	26 seats, 31.9%	10 seats, 23.0%
Seats before	48	26	10
Seats won	46	22	14
Seat change	▼2	▼4	▲4
Popular vote	158,942	108,043	113,048
Percentage	39.2%	26.6%	27.9%
Swing	▼1.1%	▼5.3%	▲4.9%
	Fourth party
Party	Green
Last election	0 seats, 4.2%
Seats before	0
Seats won	2
Seat change	▲2
Popular vote	18,786
Percentage	4.6%
Swing	▲0.4%
- Map showing the results of the 2005 Norfolk County Council elections.
Party before election
Conservative
Elected Party
Conservative

The 2005 Norfolk County Council election took place on 5 May 2005, coinciding with local elections for all county councils in England and the 2005 general election. It was the first election to be held under new boundaries.

The Conservatives were re-elected with a slightly smaller majority of 8 seats and the Liberal Democrats surpassed Labour in vote share (though not in seats). The Green Party won their first seats on the County Council, both in Norwich.

Other parties and independent candidates stood without winning seats and making little impact.

== Results ==
2005 Norfolk County Council election
Party	Candidates	Seats	Gains	Losses	Net gain/loss	Seats %	Votes %	Votes	+/−
Conservative	84	46	2	4	▼2	54.8	39.2	158,942	–1.0
Labour	78	22	2	1	▼4	26.2	26.6	108,043	–5.3
Liberal Democrats	83	14	6	5	▲4	16.7	27.9	113,148	+4.9
Green	47	2	2	0	▲2	2.4	4.6	18,786	+0.4
UKIP	11	0	0	0	Steady	0.0	0.8	3,072	N/A
Independent	4	0	0	0	Steady	0.0	0.7	2,799	+0.1
Norwich Over The Water	1	0	0	0	Steady	0.0	0.1	423	N/A
English Democrat	2	0	0	0	Steady	0.0	0.1	397	N/A
Legalise Cannabis	2	0	0	0	Steady	0.0	0.1	233	N/A

=== Election of Group Leaders ===
Alison King (Humbleyard) was re-elected leader of the Conservative Group, Irene Macdonald (King's Lynn North and Central) became leader of the Labour Group and Barbara Hacker (Thorpe Hamlet) was elected leader of the Liberal Democratic Group.

Barbara Hacker would retire as leader in May 2007 to be replaced by deputy Paul Morse (North Walsham East).

Macdonald would be replaced by Susan Whitaker (Lakenham) before the next election.

=== Election of Leader of the Council ===
Alison King (Humbleyard) the leader of the Conservative group was duly re-elected leader of the council and formed a Conservative administration.

King would stand down in March 2006 and was replaced by Shaun Murphy (Wroxham), who would retire after only a year in the job.

Daniel Cox (Wymondham) would replace him.

== Results by District ==
=== Breckland ===
Breckland District Summary
Party	Seats	+/-	Votes	%	+/-
Conservative	9	▲1	25,856	43.9	–2.4
Labour	3	Steady	17,663	30.0	–4.2
Liberal Democrats	0	Steady	12,682	21.5	+7.2
Green	0	Steady	1,804	3.1	–2.3
UKIP	0	Steady	545	0.9	N/A
Independent	0	Steady	407	0.7	N/A
Total	12	▲1	58,957	62.8	+0.2
Registered electors			93,816	+5,081	+10.3

Division results

Attleborough
Party	Candidate	Votes	%	±%
Conservative	Alexander Byrne*	2,332	45.3	–5.6
Labour	Robert Smith	1,557	30.2	–2.0
Liberal Democrats	Susan Yetton	1,262	24.5	+11.4
Majority		775	15.0	–3.6
Turnout		5,151	61.4	+0.5
Registered electors		8,395		
Conservative hold		Swing	▼1.8	

Dereham North
Party	Candidate	Votes	%
Conservative	John Gretton*	1,744	39.2
Labour	Judith Crutch	1,425	32.0
Liberal Democrats	Jean Markwell	749	16.8
Green	Ann Bowyer	281	6.3
UKIP	David Wilson	249	5.6
Majority		319	7.2
Turnout		4,448	60.9
Registered electors		7,299	
Conservative win (new seat)			

Dereham South
Party	Candidate	Votes	%
Labour	Robin Goreham	1,964	40.9
Conservative	Phillip Duigan	1,777	37.0
Liberal Democrats	Michael Blake	806	16.8
Green	Timothy Birt	252	5.3
Majority		187	3.9
Turnout		4,799	60.4
Registered electors		7,951	
Labour win (new seat)			

Elmham & Mattishall
Party	Candidate	Votes	%	±%
Conservative	Ingrid Blackman*	2,855	48.6	–3.1
Labour	Janice Smith	1,524	25.9	–5.2
Liberal Democrats	Susan Matthew	1,078	18.3	+5.7
Green	David Bowyer	420	7.1	+2.5
Majority		1,331	22.6	+2.1
Turnout		5,877	67.1	+3.2
Registered electors		8,755		
Conservative hold		Swing	▲1.1	

Guiltcross
Party	Candidate	Votes	%	±%
Conservative	John Baskerville*	2,677	49.1	–0.7
Liberal Democrats	Stephen Gordon	1,590	29.1	+13.8
Labour	Jean Hay	1,189	21.8	–4.9
Majority		1,087	19.9	–3.3
Turnout		5,456	69.0	+1.3
Registered electors		7,911		
Conservative hold		Swing	▼7.3	

Necton & Launditch
Party	Candidate	Votes	%	±%
Conservative	Christopher Owen*	2,440	42.1	–5.8
Labour	Christopher Holland	1,684	29.1	–7.3
Liberal Democrats	Helen Blake	1,057	18.2	+7.6
Green	Alison Keidan-Cooper	316	5.5	+0.4
UKIP	Simon Fletcher	296	5.1	N/A
Majority		756	13.1	+1.6
Turnout		5,793	70.9	+0.9
Registered electors		8,169		
Conservative hold		Swing	▲0.8	

Swaffham
Party	Candidate	Votes	%	±%
Conservative	Shirley Matthews	2,018	44.1	–2.9
Liberal Democrats	David Cannon	1,284	28.0	+7.5
Labour	Sylvia Armes	1,072	23.4	–5.9
Green	Nigel Walker	204	4.5	+1.4
Majority		734	16.0	–1.7
Turnout		4,578	63.1	–0.9
Registered electors		7,254		
Conservative hold		Swing	▼5.2	

The Brecks
Party	Candidate	Votes	%
Conservative	Ian Monson*	2,997	53.2
Labour	Dennis Sully	1,401	24.9
Liberal Democrats	Kenneth Rooke	1,238	22.0
Majority		1,596	28.3
Turnout		5,636	65.9
Registered electors		8,552	
Conservative win (new seat)			

Thetford East
Party	Candidate	Votes	%	±%
Labour	Colin Armes*	1,408	36.5	–17.6
Conservative	Marion Chapman-Allen	1,382	35.8	–3.5
Liberal Democrats	Daniel Jeffrey	663	17.2	N/A
Independent	John Harding	407	10.5	N/A
Majority		26	0.7	–14.2
Turnout		3,860	57.8	+0.7
Registered electors		6,679		
Labour hold		Swing	▼7.1	

Thetford West
Party	Candidate	Votes	%	±%
Labour	Thelma Paines*	2,101	47.8	–3.9
Conservative	Sharon O'Mahony	1,268	28.8	–1.1
Liberal Democrats	Colin Penning	1,027	23.4	+8.7
Majority		833	18.9	–2.9
Turnout		4,396	51.1	–1.3
Registered electors		8,597		
Labour hold		Swing	▼1.4	

Watton
Party	Candidate	Votes	%	±%
Conservative	John Rogers*	1,975	48.6	+1.8
Labour	Christopher Walls	1,127	27.7	+8.9
Liberal Democrats	David Thomas	964	23.7	–6.2
Majority		848	20.9	+4.0
Turnout		4,066	57.1	–6.4
Registered electors		7,125		
Conservative hold		Swing	▼3.6	

Yare & All Saints
Party	Candidate	Votes	%
Conservative	Clifton Jordan*	2,391	48.8
Labour	Michael Fanthorpe	1,211	24.7
Liberal Democrats	Jane Key	964	19.7
Green	Jasmine Rising	331	6.8
Majority		1,180	24.1
Turnout		4,897	68.7
Registered electors		7,129	
Conservative win (new seat)			

=== Broadland ===
Broadland District Summary
Party	Seats	+/-	Votes	%	+/-
Conservative	10	Steady	25,698	39.6	–2.1
Liberal Democrats	2	▲1	17,273	26.6	+5.6
Labour	1	Steady	18,454	28.4	–4.9
Green	0	Steady	2,005	3.1	±0.0
Independent	0	Steady	1,226	1.9	+1.0
UKIP	0	Steady	221	0.3	N/A
Total	13	▲1	64,877	67.0	+1.9
Registered electors			96,777	–	+2.2

Division results

Acle
Party	Candidate	Votes	%	±%
Conservative	Brian Iles*	1,894	41.9	+4.5
Labour	Elsie Grimson	1,442	31.9	–1.5
Liberal Democrats	Joyce Groves	1,183	26.2	+10.9
Majority		452	10.0	+5.9
Turnout		4,519	67.8	–0.7
Registered electors		6,668		
Conservative hold		Swing	▲3.0	

Aylsham
Party	Candidate	Votes	%	±%
Liberal Democrats	Graham Rix	1,862	37.4	+20.5
Conservative	Derek Turnbull*	1,833	36.9	–6.0
Labour	Deborah Kemp	1,279	25.7	–10.4
Majority		29	0.6	N/A
Turnout		4,974	70.1	+3.3
Registered electors		7,094		
Liberal Democrats gain from Conservative		Swing	▲13.3	

Blofield & Brundall
Party	Candidate	Votes	%	±%
Conservative	Christian Mowle*	2,328	46.1	–2.2
Liberal Democrats	Philip Matthew	1,367	27.1	+9.7
Labour	Christine Hemmingway	1,354	26.8	–3.8
Majority		961	19.0	+1.2
Turnout		5,049	69.7	+0.2
Registered electors		7,249		
Conservative hold		Swing	▼6.0	

Drayton & Horsford
Party	Candidate	Votes	%
Conservative	Anthony Adams*	1,958	40.0
Labour	Daniel Roper	1,354	27.7
Liberal Democrats	Veronica Beadle	1,314	26.9
Green	Rachel Heeds	263	5.4
Majority		604	12.4
Turnout		4,889	63.2
Registered electors		7,739	
Conservative win (new seat)			

Hellesdon
Party	Candidate	Votes	%	±%
Conservative	Shelagh Gurney*	2,158	36.4	–3.7
Liberal Democrats	Peter Balcombe	1,711	28.9	+2.2
Labour	Wendy Thorogood	1,659	28.0	–2.5
UKIP	John Youles	221	3.7	N/A
Green	Jennifer Parkhouse	172	2.9	+0.3
Majority		447	7.5	–2.0
Turnout		5,921	65.3	+1.6
Registered electors		9,071		
Conservative hold		Swing	▼3.0	

Hevingham & Spixworth
Party	Candidate	Votes	%
Conservative	Anthony Williams	2,094	44.1
Labour	Jeffrey Read	1,458	30.7
Liberal Democrats	Balvinder Singh-Kular	1,199	25.2
Majority		636	13.4
Turnout		4,751	67.4
Registered electors		7,052	
Conservative win (new seat)			

Old Catton
Party	Candidate	Votes	%	±%
Conservative	Stuart Dunn	1,790	39.9	–1.9
Labour	Clifford Cutting	1,456	32.5	–4.4
Liberal Democrats	Martin Callam	1,019	22.7	+4.0
Green	David Rogers	217	4.8	+2.1
Majority		334	7.5	+2.6
Turnout		4,482	67.6	+1.5
Registered electors		6,629		
Conservative hold		Swing	▲1.3	

Reepham
Party	Candidate	Votes	%	±%
Liberal Democrats	James Joyce	1,840	43.1	+16.0
Conservative	Brenda Ravencroft *	1,576	36.9	–5.5
Labour	Terry Glasspole	857	20.1	–5.2
Majority		264	6.2	N/A
Turnout		4,273	68.2	±0.0
Registered electors		6,266		
Liberal Democrats gain from Conservative		Swing	▲10.8	

Sprowston
Party	Candidate	Votes	%	±%
Labour	Barbara Lashley	2,149	34.2	+2.2
Liberal Democrats	Dalmaine Dewgarde*	2,100	33.4	–3.5
Conservative	Tony Landamore	1,782	28.4	–0.6
Green	Sean Creaser	249	4.0	+1.8
Majority		49	0.8	N/A
Turnout		6,280	66.3	+2.1
Registered electors		9,473		
Labour gain from Liberal Democrats		Swing	▲2.9	

Taverham
Party	Candidate	Votes	%	±%
Conservative	Evelyn Collishaw*	2,247	43.7	–1.9
Labour	Jason Bill	1,462	28.4	–7.2
Liberal Democrats	Dawn Lister	1,105	21.5	+4.5
Green	Julie Jameron	326	6.3	+4.5
Majority		785	15.3	+5.3
Turnout		5,140	65.5	+6.0
Registered electors		7,849		
Conservative hold		Swing	▲2.7	

Thorpe St Andrew
Party	Candidate	Votes	%	±%
Conservative	Ian Mackie*	2,181	45.5	+1.9
Labour	Susan Eltringham	1,309	27.3	–8.9
Liberal Democrats	Ann Wright	1,005	21.0	+4.3
Green	John Tierney	298	6.2	+2.6
Majority		872	18.2	+10.8
Turnout		4,793	65.7	+3.1
Registered electors		7,296		
Conservative hold		Swing	▲5.4	

Woodside
Party	Candidate	Votes	%	±%
Conservative	Nigel Shaw	1,761	39.6	+0.4
Labour	Pamela Harwood *	1,727	38.8	–1.7
Liberal Democrats	Shamsher Singh-Sidar	705	15.8	–2.5
Green	Fiona Dowson	256	5.8	+3.8
Majority		34	0.8	N/A
Turnout		4,449	66.7	±0.0
Registered electors		6,666		
Conservative gain from Labour		Swing	▲1.1	

Wroxham
Party	Candidate	Votes	%	±%
Conservative	Shaun Murphy	2,096	39.1	–9.1
Independent	David Teager	1,226	22.9	N/A
Labour	Malcolm Kemp	948	17.7	–11.8
Liberal Democrats	Alan Williams	863	16.1	–1.2
Green	Peter Reeve	224	4.2	–0.9
Majority		870	16.2	–2.5
Turnout		5,357	69.3	+1.5
Registered electors		7,725		
Conservative hold				

=== Great Yarmouth ===
Great Yarmouth District Summary
Party	Seats	+/-	Votes	%	+/-
Labour	6	▼1	18,079	43.7	–5.4
Conservative	3	Steady	15,543	37.6	–2.9
Liberal Democrats	0	Steady	5,282	12.8	+6.3
UKIP	0	Steady	1,968	4.8	N/A
Green	0	Steady	248	0.6	–3.3
Legalise Cannabis	0	Steady	204	0.5	N/A
Total	9	▼1	41,324	59.6	+2.0
Registered electors			69,366	+3	+0.0

Division results

Breydon
Party	Candidate	Votes	%
Labour	Trevor Wainwright	2,445	48.3
Conservative	Robert Christmas	1,711	33.8
Liberal Democrats	Jennifer Pitchford	617	12.2
UKIP	Alan Baugh	290	5.7
Majority		734	14.5
Turnout		5,063	61.1
Registered electors		8,287	
Labour win (new seat)			

Caister-on-Sea
Party	Candidate	Votes	%
Labour	Patrick Hacon*	2,111	45.9
Conservative	Barry Cunniffe	1,849	40.2
Liberal Democrats	Nicholas Dyer	642	14.0
Majority		262	5.7
Turnout		4,602	63.6
Registered electors		7,237	
Labour win (new seat)			

East Flegg
Party	Candidate	Votes	%	±%
Conservative	James Shrimplin *	2,455	51.5	+2.8
Labour	Derrick Sweeting	1,367	28.7	–9.4
Liberal Democrats	Pamela Mayhew	693	14.5	+3.8
Green	Mark Maguire	248	5.2	+2.7
Majority		1,088	22.8	+12.2
Turnout		4,763	66.1	+4.2
Registered electors		7,204		
Conservative hold		Swing	▲6.1	

Gorleston St Andrews
Party	Candidate	Votes	%	±%
Conservative	Bertie Collins *	1,798	40.7	–4.8
Labour	Anthony Blyth *	1,654	37.5	–2.7
Liberal Democrats	Ivan Lees	736	16.7	+5.1
UKIP	Terence Wake	225	5.1	N/A
Majority		144	3.3	–2.0
Turnout		4,413	61.5	+1.1
Registered electors		7,179		
Conservative hold		Swing	▼1.1	

Lothingland
Party	Candidate	Votes	%
Labour	Brian Walker	2,109	40.4
Conservative	Patrick Cook	2,067	39.6
Liberal Democrats	Judith Tryggvason	658	12.6
UKIP	Colin Aldred	383	7.3
Majority		42	0.8
Turnout		5,217	61.6
Registered electors		8,467	
Labour win (new seat)			

Magdalen
Party	Candidate	Votes	%
Labour	Colleen Walker*	2,538	55.9
Conservative	Patricia Page	1,197	26.4
Liberal Democrats	Allan Bedford	495	10.9
UKIP	Michael Dix	307	6.8
Majority		1,341	29.6
Turnout		4,537	55.2
Registered electors		8,218	
Labour win (new seat)			

West Flegg
Party	Candidate	Votes	%	±%
Conservative	Michael Carttiss*	1,743	46.5	–1.3
Labour	Barry Anderson	1,158	30.9	–5.5
Liberal Democrats	Rodney Cole	849	22.6	+10.2
Majority		583	15.6	+4.1
Turnout		3,750	65.4	+1.5
Registered electors		5,736		
Conservative hold		Swing	▲1.6	

Yarmouth Nelson & Southtown
Party	Candidate	Votes	%
Labour	John Holmes	2,239	56.1
Conservative	Elizabeth Giles	1,103	27.6
UKIP	Jason Delf	445	11.2
Legalise Cannabis	Michael Skipper	204	5.1
Majority		1,136	28.5
Turnout		3,991	48.2
Registered electors		8,284	
Labour win (new seat)			

Yarmouth North & Central
Party	Candidate	Votes	%
Labour	Michael Taylor *	2,458	49.3
Conservative	Peter Meah	1,620	32.5
Liberal Democrats	Antohny Harris	592	11.9
UKIP	Colin Warnes	318	6.4
Majority		838	16.8
Turnout		4,988	57.0
Registered electors		8,754	
Labour win (new seat)			

=== King's Lynn and West Norfolk ===
King's Lynn & West Norfolk District Summary
Party	Seats	+/-	Votes	%	+/-
Conservative	10	Steady	33,059	48.4	+1.1
Labour	3	▼1	16,614	24.3	–6.0
Liberal Democrats	1	▲1	16,313	23.9	+8.1
Independent	0	Steady	1,166	1.7	–1.3
Green	0	Steady	1,091	1.6	–2.0
Total	14	Steady	68,243	61.2	–3.0
Registered electors			111,471	+6,834	+6.1

Division results

Clenchwarton & King's Lynn South
Party	Candidate	Votes	%
Liberal Democrats	Judith Brown	1,483	34.6
Conservative	Michael Chenery	1,470	34.3
Labour	Margaret Wilkinson	1,333	31.1
Majority		13	0.3
Turnout		4,286	60.8
Registered electors		7,044	
Liberal Democrats win (new seat)			

Dersingham
Party	Candidate	Votes	%	±%
Conservative	Janice Eells *	2,651	43.9	+4.5
Liberal Democrats	Kathleen Sayer	2,231	36.9	+2.7
Labour	Ruth Barber	1,156	19.1	–5.2
Majority		420	7.0	+1.8
Turnout		6,038	69.6	–1.7
Registered electors		8,674		
Conservative hold		Swing	▲0.9	

Docking
Party	Candidate	Votes	%	±%
Conservative	Rosalie Monbiot*	2,620	48.2	–8.5
Labour	David Collis	1,752	32.3	+4.4
Liberal Democrats	Colin Sayer	1,059	19.5	+8.5
Majority		868	16.0	–12.9
Turnout		5,431	65.6	+0.6
Registered electors		8,281		
Conservative hold		Swing	▼6.5	

Downham Market
Party	Candidate	Votes	%	±%
Conservative	Shelagh Hutson	2,494	59.6	+4.5
Liberal Democrats	Caroline Russell	1,689	40.4	+30.6
Majority		805	19.2	–3.8
Turnout		4,183	62.5	–4.9
Registered electors		6,689		
Conservative hold		Swing	▼13.1	

Feltwell
Party	Candidate	Votes	%	±%
Conservative	Anthony White	2,847	53.0	+0.3
Liberal Democrats	Martin Farrelly	1,775	33.1	–7.4
Green	Andrew Smith	748	13.9	+7.1
Majority		1,072	20.0	+7.7
Turnout		5,370	60.4	–1.6
Registered electors		8,891		
Conservative hold		Swing	▲3.9	

Fincham
Party	Candidate	Votes	%	±%
Conservative	Richard Rockcliffe *	2,909	55.9	+2.2
Labour	Steve Everett	1,467	28.2	–3.4
Liberal Democrats	Roy Baldwin	829	15.9	+4.4
Majority		1,442	27.7	+5.6
Turnout		5,205	64.7	–2.4
Registered electors		8,046		
Conservative hold		Swing	▲2.8	

Freebridge Lynn
Party	Candidate	Votes	%	±%
Conservative	David Rye*	2,670	52.8	+2.2
Labour	David Berry	1,345	26.6	–3.3
Liberal Democrats	Matthew Farthing	1,041	20.6	+3.7
Majority		1,325	26.2	+5.4
Turnout		5,056	70.4	–1.4
Registered electors		7,180		
Conservative hold		Swing	▲2.8	

Gayton & Nar Valley
Party	Candidate	Votes	%
Conservative	Heather Bolt*	2,718	53.3
Labour	Lawrence Wilkinson	1,363	26.8
Liberal Democrats	Scott Livesey	671	13.2
Green	Catherine Hill	343	6.7
Majority		1,355	26.6
Turnout		5,095	63.8
Registered electors		7,991	
Conservative win (new seat)			

Gaywood North & Central
Party	Candidate	Votes	%	±%
Labour	John Collop	1,906	42.8	–3.2
Conservative	Paul Foster	1,771	39.8	+0.2
Liberal Democrats	Hazel Fredericks	772	17.4	+5.7
Majority		135	3.0	–3.4
Turnout		4,449	60.6	–3.1
Registered electors		7,336		
Labour hold		Swing	▼1.7	

Gaywood South
Party	Candidate	Votes	%	±%
Labour	Charles Joyce*	2,130	44.2	–14.4
Conservative	Michael Langwade	1,765	36.6	+7.3
Liberal Democrats	Teresa Brandon	926	19.2	+9.1
Majority		365	7.6	–21.7
Turnout		4,821	53.4	–0.8
Registered electors		9,025		
Labour hold		Swing	▼10.9	

King's Lynn North & Central
Party	Candidate	Votes	%	±%
Labour	Irene Macdonald	1,738	50.3	–8.0
Conservative	Mark Shorting	1,053	30.5	+0.8
Liberal Democrats	Mark Seaman	662	19.2	+10.7
Majority		685	19.8	–8.8
Turnout		3,453	46.9	–10.0
Registered electors		7,358		
Labour hold		Swing	▼4.4	

Marshland North
Party	Candidate	Votes	%	±%
Conservative	Anthony Wright*	2,269	49.9	+2.1
Labour	James Moriarty	1,240	27.3	–5.1
Liberal Democrats	Florence James	1,038	22.8	+5.1
Majority		1,029	22.6	+7.2
Turnout		4,547	61.6	–2.9
Registered electors		7,378		
Conservative hold		Swing	▲3.6	

Marshland South
Party	Candidate	Votes	%	±%
Conservative	Harry Humphrey*	2,914	55.7	+1.1
Liberal Democrats	Michael Brindle	1,150	22.0	N/A
Independent	Roger Parnell	812	15.5	N/A
Independent	David Markinson	354	6.8	N/A
Majority		1,764	22.6	+3.7
Turnout		5,230	61.6	+4.2
Registered electors		9,160		
Conservative hold		Swing		

North Coast
Party	Candidate	Votes	%
Conservative	Stephen Bett *	2,908	57.3
Labour	Peter Wilkinson	1,184	23.3
Liberal Democrats	Paul Burall	987	19.4
Majority		1,724	33.9
Turnout		5,079	60.3
Registered electors		8,418	
Conservative win (new seat)			

=== North Norfolk ===
North Norfolk District Summary
Party	Seats	+/-	Votes	%	+/-
Liberal Democrats	6	▲5	23,615	40.9	+7.9
Conservative	5	▼3	22,336	38.7	–2.0
Labour	0	▼1	9,724	16.8	–5.9
Green	0	Steady	1,828	3.2	–0.4
English Democrats	0	Steady	220	0.4	N/A
Total	11	▲1	57,723	72.1	+3.2
Registered electors			80,087	–	–0.2

Division results

Cromer
Party	Candidate	Votes	%	±%
Liberal Democrats	Barry Connell	2,161	38.7	+3.4
Conservative	Thomas Manners	2,065	37.0	–5.3
Labour	David Spencer	981	17.6	–1.5
Green	Peter Crouch	374	6.7	+3.4
Majority		96	1.7	N/A
Turnout		5,581	68.7	+2.5
Registered electors		7,072		
Liberal Democrats gain from Conservative		Swing	▲4.4	

Fakenham
Party	Candidate	Votes	%	±%
Liberal Democrats	David Callaby	2,181	42.1	+17.6
Conservative	Roy Banham*	1,722	33.2	–7.7
Labour	Brenda Coldrick	1,038	20.0	–12.2
Green	Timothy Doncaster	238	4.6	+2.2
Majority		459	8.9	N/A
Turnout		5,179	66.2	+0.3
Registered electors		7,827		
Liberal Democrats gain from Conservative		Swing	▲12.7	

Holt
Party	Candidate	Votes	%	±%
Conservative	John Perry-Warnes*	2,717	49.1	+0.2
Liberal Democrats	John Sweeney	2,023	36.5	–2.3
Labour	Desmond Hewitt	510	9.2	–0.5
Green	Alan Marett	285	5.1	+2.5
Majority		694	12.5	+2.4
Turnout		5,535	74.2	+0.8
Registered electors		7,460		
Conservative hold		Swing	▲1.3	

Hoveton & Stalham
Party	Candidate	Votes	%
Conservative	Michael Wright	1,842	38.1
Liberal Democrats	Catherine Wilkins	1,519	31.4
Labour	Sheila Cullingham	1,275	26.4
Green	Deborah Mereditch	200	4.1
Majority		323	6.7
Turnout		4,836	70.2
Registered electors		6,886	
Conservative win (new seat)			

Melton Constable
Party	Candidate	Votes	%
Liberal Democrats	Jacqueline Howe	1,978	37.5
Conservative	Russell Wright	1,977	37.5
Labour	Aubrey Poberefsky	1,318	25.0
Majority		1	0.0
Turnout		5,273	72.3
Registered electors		7,298	
Liberal Democrats win (new seat)			

Mundesley
Party	Candidate	Votes	%	±%
Conservative	Wyndham Northam*	2,292	43.5	+0.9
Liberal Democrats	Patrick Wilkins	2,107	39.9	+2.1
Labour	Michael Cox	657	12.5	–2.8
Green	Rupert Rosser	219	4.2	–0.1
Majority		185	3.5	–1.3
Turnout		5,275	74.7	+5.7
Registered electors		7,065		
Conservative hold		Swing	▼0.6	

North Walsham East
Party	Candidate	Votes	%
Liberal Democrats	Paul Morse	2,915	49.0
Conservative	Arthur Vincent*	1,883	31.6
Labour	David Russell	933	15.7
English Democrat	Christine Constable	220	3.7
Majority		1,032	17.3
Turnout		5,951	70.2
Registered electors		8,481	
Liberal Democrats win (new seat)			

North Walsham West & Erpingham
Party	Candidate	Votes	%
Liberal Democrats	Peter Moore	2,240	46.6
Conservative	Peter Wilcox	1,740	36.2
Labour	Patricia Hardy	824	17.2
Majority		500	10.4
Turnout		4,804	72.3
Registered electors		6,647	
Liberal Democrats win (new seat)			

Sheringham
Party	Candidate	Votes	%	±%
Liberal Democrats	Brian Hannah*	2,592	53.2	+5.2
Conservative	Peter Fitch	1,630	33.5	–5.2
Labour	David Thompson	451	9.3	–1.0
Green	Peter Morrison	198	4.1	+1.1
Majority		962	19.7	+10.4
Turnout		4,871	70.6	±0.0
Registered electors		6,896		
Liberal Democrats hold		Swing	▲5.2	

South Smallburgh
Party	Candidate	Votes	%	±%
Conservative	Christopher How	2,414	46.7	–0.8
Liberal Democrats	Shirley Partridge	2,019	39.0	+8.4
Labour	Michael Ward	738	14.3	–3.1
Majority		395	7.6	–9.2
Turnout		5,171	72.0	+2.0
Registered electors		7,178		
Conservative hold		Swing	▼4.6	

Wells
Party	Candidate	Votes	%	±%
Conservative	Derek Baxter*	2,054	39.1	–2.8
Liberal Democrats	Anthony Groom	1,880	35.8	+3.2
Labour	Michael Gates	999	19.0	–2.3
Green	Alicia Hull	314	6.0	+1.8
Majority		174	3.3	–6.0
Turnout		5,247	72.1	+1.3
Registered electors		7,277		
Conservative hold		Swing	▼3.0	

=== Norwich ===
Norwich District Summary
Party	Seats	+/-	Votes	%	+/-
Labour	9	▼2	18,870	36.4	–5.3
Liberal Democrats	2	▼3	15,091	29.1	–2.3
Green	2	▲2	8,436	16.3	+9.6
Conservative	0	Steady	8,970	17.3	–2.9
Norwich Over the Water	0	Steady	423	0.8	N/A
UKIP	0	Steady	52	0.1	N/A
Legalise Cannabis	0	Steady	29	0.1	N/A
Total	13	▼3	51,871	55.4	–1.1
Registered electors			93,680	–	–1.7

Division results

Bowthorpe
Party	Candidate	Votes	%	±%
Labour	Gail Loveday *	1,836	47.7	–2.9
Liberal Democrats	Simon Richardson	871	22.6	+0.3
Conservative	Victor Hopes	816	21.2	0.7
Green	Niholas Bishop	325	8.4	+3.1
Majority		965	25.1	–3.3
Turnout		3,848	50.5	+1.5
Registered electors		7,617		
Labour hold		Swing	▼1.6	

Catton Grove
Party	Candidate	Votes	%	±%
Labour	Brian Morrey*	1,687	45.8	–2.5
Conservative	Leslie Mogford	906	24.6	–3.1
Liberal Democrats	Esther Harris	753	20.4	+1.2
Green	Richard Bearman	338	9.2	+4.4
Majority		781	21.2	+0.6
Turnout		3,684	50.6	+0.3
Registered electors		7,287		
Labour hold		Swing	▲0.3	

Crome
Party	Candidate	Votes	%	±%
Labour	George Nobbs	2,110	51.3	–2.2
Liberal Democrats	Irene Bowling	896	21.8	+6.9
Conservative	John Fisher	866	21.1	–8.5
Green	Christopher Webb	242	5.9	+3.9
Majority		1,214	29.5	+5.5
Turnout		4,114	58.2	–1.3
Registered electors		7,072		
Labour hold		Swing	▼4.6	

Eaton
Party	Candidate	Votes	%	±%
Liberal Democrats	Mervyn Scutter *	2,578	48.1	+0.3
Conservative	Nathan Bennett	1,402	26.2	–7.4
Labour	Nicholas Waters	939	17.5	+1.6
Green	Neville Bartlett	408	7.6	+5.0
Legalise Cannabis	Farooque Ahmed	29	0.5	N/A
Majority		1,176	22.0	+7.8
Turnout		5,356	73.9	–1.3
Registered electors		7,251		
Liberal Democrats hold		Swing	▲3.9	

Lakenham
Party	Candidate	Votes	%	±%
Labour	Susan Whitaker*	1,977	48.0	+1.1
Liberal Democrats	Nersi Shahidi	1,137	27.6	–4.5
Conservative	Eileen Wyatt	652	15.8	–0.3
Green	Peter Anderson	356	8.6	+3.7
Majority		840	20.4	+5.7
Turnout		4,122	59.1	+2.3
Registered electors		6,978		
Labour hold		Swing	▲2.8	

Mancroft
Party	Candidate	Votes	%	±%
Labour	Mary McKay *	1,321	36.7	–2.8
Liberal Democrats	Paul Boulton	1,126	31.3	+0.5
Green	Susan Curran	648	18.0	+9.4
Conservative	Giovanna Maurizio	501	13.9	–7.2
Majority		195	5.4	–3.2
Turnout		3,596	51.5	–1.7
Registered electors		6,977		
Labour hold		Swing	▼1.7	

Mile Cross
Party	Candidate	Votes	%	±%
Labour	Peter Harwood *	1,787	51.9	–12.6
Liberal Democrats	Peter Beard	799	23.2	+8.6
Conservative	David Mackie	537	15.6	–2.2
Green	Karen Groom	322	9.3	+6.2
Majority		988	28.7	–18.0
Turnout		3,445	48.5	+0.8
Registered electors		7,104		
Labour hold		Swing	▼10.6	

Nelson
Party	Candidate	Votes	%	±%
Green	Andrew Boswell	2,135	44.9	+34.8
Liberal Democrats	Andrew Higson	1,270	26.7	–13.2
Labour	Peter Bartram	879	18.5	–19.8
Conservative	Lisa Ivory	467	9.8	–2.0
Majority		865	18.2	N/A
Turnout		4,751	68.6	+5.8
Registered electors		6,922		
Green gain from Liberal Democrats		Swing	▲24.0	

Sewell
Party	Candidate	Votes	%
Labour	Catherine Ward *	1,632	41.0
Liberal Democrats	Simon Nobbs	797	20.0
Conservative	Edwin Williams	643	16.1
Green	Richard Edwards	487	12.2
Norwich Over the Water	David Bethell	423	10.6
Majority		835	21.0
Turnout		3,982	54.3
Registered electors		7,333	
Labour win (new seat)			

Thorpe Hamlet
Party	Candidate	Votes	%	±%
Liberal Democrats	Barbara Hacker*	1,587	40.6	–4.3
Labour	Robin Taylor	1,116	28.5	–6.0
Conservative	Trevor Ivory	723	18.5	+3.5
Green	Stephen Little	486	12.4	+6.8
Majority		471	12.0	+1.6
Turnout		3,912	53.9	+1.2
Registered electors		7,260		
Liberal Democrats hold		Swing	▲0.9	

Town Close
Party	Candidate	Votes	%	±%
Green	Christopher Hull	1,151	36.1	+30.9
Liberal Democrats	Moira Toye	958	30.1	–11.7
Labour	David Fullman	606	19.0	–14.7
Conservative	John Wyatt	470	14.8	–4.5
Majority		193	6.1	N/A
Turnout		3,185	40.9	–18.6
Registered electors		7,781		
Green gain from Liberal Democrats		Swing	▲21.3	

University
Party	Candidate	Votes	%	±%
Labour	Roy Blower	1,531	40.9	+6.4
Liberal Democrats	Jane Rooza*	1,225	32.7	–12.2
Green	Katherine Willett	493	13.2	+6.4
Conservative	Thomas Holland	440	11.8	–0.5
UKIP	Vandra Ahlstrom	52	1.4	N/A
Majority		306	8.2	N/A
Turnout		3,689	54.5	–1.2
Registered electors		6,859		
Labour gain from Liberal Democrats		Swing	▲9.3	

Wensum
Party	Candidate	Votes	%
Labour	Harriet Panting*	1,449	35.9
Green	Tom Llewellyn	1,045	25.9
Liberal Democrats	Phillip Bazley	994	24.6
Conservative	Christopher Taylor	547	13.6
Majority		404	10.0
Turnout		4,035	55.7
Registered electors		7,239	
Labour win (new seat)			

=== South Norfolk ===
South Norfolk District Summary
Party	Seats	+/-	Votes	%	+/-
Conservative	9	▲1	27,480	43.7	+1.1
Liberal Democrats	3	Steady	22,892	36.4	+0.7
Labour	0	Steady	8,639	13.7	–4.7
Green	0	Steady	3,374	5.4	+2.1
UKIP	0	Steady	286	0.5	N/A
English Democrats	0	Steady	177	0.3	N/A
Total	12	▲1	62,848	68.5	+1.3
Registered electors			91,699	–	+3.8

Division results

Clavering
Party	Candidate	Votes	%	±%
Liberal Democrats	Alan Burrell	2,549	43.7	+6.5
Conservative	Anthony Tomkinson*	2,381	40.8	+3.1
Green	Derek West	444	7.6	+3.3
UKIP	David Gifford	286	4.9	N/A
English Democrat	Alan Squirrell	177	3.0	N/A
Majority		168	2.9	N/A
Turnout		5,837	68.8	–0.1
Registered electors		8,479		
Liberal Democrats gain from Conservative		Swing	▲1.7	

Costessey
Party	Candidate	Votes	%	±%
Liberal Democrats	Tim East*	2,557	50.9	–1.7
Conservative	Ronald Smith	1,193	23.7	–6.9
Labour	Cyril Gibbs	1,041	20.7	+6.4
Green	John Oxley	233	4.6	+2.1
Majority		1,364	27.1	+5.1
Turnout		5,024	63.1	+1.4
Registered electors		7,956		
Liberal Democrats hold		Swing	▲2.6	

Diss & Roydon
Party	Candidate	Votes	%
Conservative	Jennifer Chamberlin	1,846	40.1
Liberal Democrats	Jane Trippett-Jones	1,701	37.0
Labour	Albert Paines	801	17.4
Green	Graham Sessions	253	5.5
Majority		145	3.2
Turnout		4,601	62.4
Registered electors		7,368	
Conservative win (new seat)			

East Depwade
Party	Candidate	Votes	%	±%
Liberal Democrats	John Pitt-Pladdy	2,116	44.9	+10.7
Conservative	Jeremy Savage	2,099	44.5	+0.7
Green	Mercy Harmer	498	10.6	+7.2
Majority		17	0.4	N/A
Turnout		4,713	66.7	+0.9
Registered electors		7,063		
Liberal Democrats gain from Conservative		Swing	▲5.0	

Forehoe
Party	Candidate	Votes	%
Conservative	Andrew Pond	1,980	39.0
Liberal Democrats	Joanna Newman	1,798	35.4
Labour	Mark Wells	1,000	19.7
Green	Roy Walmsley	294	5.8
Majority		182	3.6
Turnout		5,072	69.5
Registered electors		7,301	
Conservative win (new seat)			

Henstead
Party	Candidate	Votes	%	±%
Conservative	Graham Hemming	2,006	39.6	–2.0
Liberal Democrats	Christopher Walker	1,846	36.5	+4.4
Labour	Nicola Fowler	903	17.8	–4.5
Green	Areti Brockbank	309	6.1	+2.1
Majority		160	3.2	–6.3
Turnout		5,064	72.6	+2.3
Registered electors		6,972		
Conservative hold		Swing	▼3.2	

Hingham
Party	Candidate	Votes	%	±%
Conservative	Steven Dorrington*	2,000	45.3	+4.4
Liberal Democrats	John Devenney	1,336	30.3	–6.4
Labour	John Cowan	770	17.4	+0.2
Green	Andrew Brockbank	310	7.0	+1.8
Majority		664	15.0	+10.9
Turnout		4,416	71.1	+2.2
Registered electors		6,214		
Conservative hold		Swing	▲5.4	

Humbleyard
Party	Candidate	Votes	%	±%
Conservative	Alison King*	2,533	46.1	–2.6
Liberal Democrats	Jaqueline Sutton	1,828	33.3	+0.9
Labour	Alan Waddington	810	14.7	–1.6
Green	Frances Mortimer	324	5.9	+3.3
Majority		705	12.8	–3.5
Turnout		5,495	71.1	+0.1
Registered electors		7,731		
Conservative hold		Swing	▼1.8	

Loddon
Party	Candidate	Votes	%	±%
Conservative	Adrian Gunson*	3,834	65.1	–3.7
Liberal Democrats	Justin Barnard	939	15.9	+1.7
Labour	Timothy Sanders	802	13.6	–0.6
Green	Ingo Wagenknecht	318	5.4	+2.5
Majority		2,895	49.1	–5.5
Turnout		5,893	72.7	+1.9
Registered electors		8,105		
Conservative hold		Swing	▼2.7	

Long Stratton
Party	Candidate	Votes	%	±%
Conservative	Stella Rice	2,120	41.7	+6.6
Liberal Democrats	Evelyn Domeyer	2,019	39.7	–3.9
Labour	Sally Blaikie	951	18.7	+0.3
Majority		101	2.0	N/A
Turnout		5,090	68.0	+3.4
Registered electors		7,486		
Conservative gain from Liberal Democrats		Swing	▲5.3	

West Depwade
Party	Candidate	Votes	%	±%
Conservative	Beverley Spratt	3,072	53.0	+8.2
Liberal Democrats	Bodo Rissmann	2,722	47.0	+14.7
Majority		350	6.0	–6.5
Turnout		5,794	69.4	–1.2
Registered electors		8,354		
Conservative hold		Swing	▼3.3	

Wymondham
Party	Candidate	Votes	%	±%
Conservative	Daniel Cox	2,416	41.3	+1.3
Labour	Ann Roberts	1,561	26.7	+5.3
Liberal Democrats	Susannah Beare	1,481	25.3	–11.0
Green	Andrew Mitchell	391	6.7	+4.4
Majority		855	14.6	+10.9
Turnout		5,849	67.5	–0.1
Registered electors		8,670		
Conservative hold		Swing	▼2.0	
