= 2018 Great Yarmouth Borough Council election =

2018 UK local government election

2018 local election results in Great Yarmouth

The 2018 Great Yarmouth Borough Council election took place on 4 May 2018 to elect members of Great Yarmouth Borough Council in England. This was on the same day as other local elections in England. The Conservatives gained control of the council with UKIP which had previously won 10 seats being wiped out. Part of the Conservative success was attributed to former UKIP councillors defecting to them.

== Overall result ==
Great Yarmouth Borough Council election, 2018
Party	Seats	Gains	Losses	Net gain/loss	Seats %	Votes %	Votes	+/−
Conservative	8	6	0	+6	57.1	49.4	8,914	+22.4
Labour	6	4	0	+4	42.9	39.8	7,188	+10.7
UKIP	0	0	10	-10	0.0	5.5	991	-35.4
Tribune Party	0	0	0	0	0.0	5.3	956	+5.3
Total	14						18,059	

Changes in vote share are relative to the last time these seats were contested in 2014.

== Council composition ==
Prior to the election the composition of the council was:

↓
17	11	11
Conservatives	Labour	Ukip

After the election the composition of the council was:

↓
23	15	1
Conservatives	Labour	Ukip

== Ward results ==
=== Bradwell North ===
Bradwell North
Party	Candidate	Votes	%	±%
Conservative	Graham Plant	1,076	62.1	+23.3
Labour	Jo Thurtle	656	37.9	+12.3
Majority		420	24.2	+21.1
Turnout		1732	33.7	
Conservative hold		Swing		

=== Bradwell South and Hopton ===
Bradwell South and Hopton
Party	Candidate	Votes	%	±%
Conservative	Carl Annison	1,238	68.9	+40.8
Labour	James Borg	559	31.1	+8.3
Majority		679	37.8	
Turnout		1,797	32.2	
Conservative gain from UKIP		Swing		

=== Caister North ===
Caister North
Party	Candidate	Votes	%	±%
Conservative	Graham Carpenter	716	59.6	+26.1
Labour	Sandra Griffiths	316	26.3	+2.8
UKIP	John Cutting	169	14.1	−23.9
Majority		400	33.3	
Turnout		1,201	32.9	
Conservative gain from UKIP		Swing		

=== Caister South ===
Caister South
Party	Candidate	Votes	%	±%
Conservative	Malcolm Bird	645	51.5	+25.2
Labour	Andrew Booth	401	32.0	+6.1
UKIP	Tom Andrews	146	11.7	−28.5
Tribune Party	Lynne Connell	61	4.9	+4.9
Majority		244	19.5	
Turnout		1,253	34.0	
Conservative gain from UKIP		Swing		

=== Central and Northgate ===
Central and Northgate
Party	Candidate	Votes	%	±%
Labour	Michael Smith-Clare	651	26.2	
Labour	Jade Martin	599	24.1	
Conservative	Richard Jeffs	392	15.8	
Conservative	Tom Allen	363	14.6	
UKIP	Derek Poole	246	9.9	
UKIP	Phillip Trindall	175	7.0	
Tribune Party	Paul Buttifant	61	2.5	
Majority		52	8.3	
Turnout		2,487	25.6	
Labour gain from UKIP		Swing		
Labour hold		Swing		

=== Claydon ===
Claydon
Party	Candidate	Votes	%	±%
Labour	Cara Walker	677	50.7	+12.1
Conservative	Rachael Moore	488	36.5	+18.1
Tribune Party	Michael Monk	171	12.8	+12.8
Majority		189	14.2	
Turnout		1,336	24.6	
Labour gain from UKIP		Swing		

=== East Flegg ===
East Flegg
Party	Candidate	Votes	%	±%
Conservative	Noel Galer	864	70.7	+28.9
Labour	Edd Bush	359	29.3	+16.2
Majority		505	41.4	
Turnout		1,223	31.1	
Conservative hold		Swing		

=== Gorleston ===
Gorleston
Party	Candidate	Votes	%	±%
Conservative	Kay Grey	894	64.9	+30.8
Labour	Katy Guyton	405	29.4	+4.0
Tribune Party	Victoria Webb	78	5.7	+5.7
Majority		489	35.5	
Turnout		1,377	33.9	
Conservative gain from UKIP		Swing		

=== Lothingland ===
Lothingland
Party	Candidate	Votes	%	±%
Conservative	David Drewitt	706	57.8	+19.4
Tribune Party	Adrian Myers	266	21.8	+21.8
Labour	Christina Stewart	240	19.6	+0
Majority		440	36.0	
Turnout		1,222	28.1	
Conservative gain from UKIP		Swing		

=== Magdalen ===
Magdalen
Party	Candidate	Votes	%	±%
Labour	Trevor Wainwright	749	56.1	+10.9
Conservative	George Rogers	433	32.4	+13.4
Tribune Party	Angela Buttifant	153	11.5	+11.5
Majority		316	23.7	+9.6
Turnout		1,335	26.3	
Labour hold		Swing		

=== Nelson ===
Nelson
Party	Candidate	Votes	%	±%
Labour	Tony Wright	705	57.9	+20.3
Conservative	Aurelio Goncalves Spinola	392	32.2	+19.9
Tribune Party	Matthew Swann	121	9.9	+9.9
Majority		316	25.7	
Turnout		1218	23.4	
Labour gain from UKIP		Swing		

=== Southtown and Cobholm ===
Southtown and Cobholm
Party	Candidate	Votes	%	±%
Labour	Cathy Cordiner-Achenbach	414	56.4	+14.4
Conservative	Margaret Farrow	173	23.6	+12.1
UKIP	Graham Knight	102	13.9	−32.6
Tribune Party	Hayden Turner	45	6.1	+6.1
Majority		241	32.8	
Turnout		734	20.7	
Labour gain from UKIP		Swing		

=== Yarmouth North ===
Yarmouth North
Party	Candidate	Votes	%	±%
Conservative	Kathy Stenhouse	534	46.7	+17.9
Labour	John Simmons	457	40.0	+12.3
UKIP	Philip Grimmer	153	13.4	−26.2
Majority		77	6.7	
Turnout		1,144	33.2	
Conservative gain from UKIP		Swing		
