= Tony Wright (Great Yarmouth MP) =

British politician, born 1954

Councillor Tony Wright
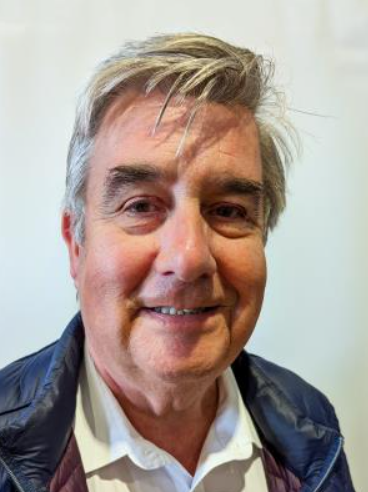

Member of Great Yarmouth Borough Council for Nelson Ward
- Incumbent
- Assumed office 4 May 2018

Member of Parliament for Great Yarmouth
- In office 2 May 1997 – 12 April 2010
- Preceded by: Michael Carttiss
- Succeeded by: Brandon Lewis

Personal details
- Born: 12 August 1954 (age 72) Great Yarmouth, Norfolk, England, United Kingdom
- Party: Labour
- Spouse: Barbara Wright (née Marley)

Anthony David Wright (born 12 August 1954) is a British Labour Party politician who was the Member of Parliament (MP) for Great Yarmouth from 1997 until losing his seat at the 2010 election. Currently Wright has been a Member of Great Yarmouth Borough Council for Nelson Ward.

== Early life ==
Wright attended to St George's Infant School, Priory Junior School, and Hospital Secondary Modern School.

From 1970 to 1974, he was an engineering apprentice, then a mechanical engineer from 1974 to 1983. He worked originally with ErieElectronics, and then was subsequently employed at Brown and Root and Probe Oil Tools.

It was through his work as an engineer that he became involved in a trade union and entered politics.

== Political career ==
In his political career, Tony Wright first stood for a Council seat in 1979 and missed out losing by 86 votes. He was subsequently voted in 1980 until 1982 when he lost by 15 votes. Tony Wright was then re-elected in 1986 and remained a Councillor until 1998.

In total he served fourteen years for Great Yarmouth Borough Council and was chairman of various committees, Deputy Leader for four years and Leader of the council for over two years from 1995 until 1997.

In addition, in 1983 Tony Wright was employed by Great Yarmouth Labour Party as full-time organiser up until the 1997 general election when he was elected as Member of Parliament for Great Yarmouth and retained his seat at both the 2001 and 2005 elections.

He is a member of Amicus and the GMB Union.

During his time in Parliament, Tony Wright sat on several committees including the Public Administration Committee and Trade and Industry Select Committee. He was active within many All Party Parliamentary Group (APPG's), including chairing the APPG for Sea Cadets and acting as treasurer for the United Kingdom Parliamentary Football Club, which is itself attributed to a great deal of charity work.

Tony Wright lists among his main accomplishments during his parliamentary career as including the securing of Objective 2 status for Great Yarmouth, securing Assisted Area status helping to attract new investment to the area, the increase in funding to Great Yarmouth's schools, police force and hospital and the introduction of SureStart services.

At the 2010 general election, Wright lost his parliamentary seat to Conservative candidate Brandon Lewis with a swing over 9% against him.

After his defeat he has since stood for Norfolk County Council in the Gorleston-on-Sea St Andrews wards in both 2013, 2017, as well as at a 2015 by election finishing second each time.

In 2018 he was reelected to Great Yarmouth Borough Council in Nelson ward and was subsequently re-elected in 2019 and 2023.

== Controversy ==
Wright found himself landed in controversy in June 2009 during the British MPs' expenses scandal when it emerged that he had accepted a £10,000 sweetener from the new owners of a rented accommodation in Dolphin Square, London SW1 on the understanding he accepted a £1,000 a month rent increase at the tax payers expense. He justified keeping the money by claiming "he took a financial hit from having to work in London when he was first elected in 1997" and highlighting how the money actually saved the tax payer £10,000 as it was not from the public purse.

Shortly after on 1 June, Wright issued a statement on this issue on his personal website:

When I was first elected I decided not to purchase a property in London but to rent instead as it was not my priority to get into the 'housing market' in order to make a potential 'profit'. It was necessary however to have somewhere to stay in London whilst I was carrying out my parliamentary duties and for this reason, I rented. In the first few years the rent and other costs exceeded the allowance at that time but I met these extra costs personally. The lease ownership of this rented flat changed and as a result of this I received a payment from the new owners.

Wright was not asked to repay anything in the results of the Legg Report but later had to repay a duplicated claim of £3,050.

== Personal life ==
Wright married Barbara “Babs” Marley on 13 August 1988 in Great Yarmouth. They have a son and daughter, and a step daughter. He supports Norwich City F.C.

Parliament of the United Kingdom
Preceded by Michael Carttiss	Member of Parliament for Great Yarmouth; 1997–2010	Succeeded by Brandon Lewis
