= 2009 Norfolk County Council election =

2009 UK local government election

← 2005	4 June 2009	2013 →

All 84 council division seats 43 seats needed for a majority

	First party	Second party	Third party
Party	Conservative	Liberal Democrats	Green
Last election	46 seats, 39.2%	14 seats, 27.9%	2 seats, 4.6%
Seats before	46	12	3
Seats won	60	13	7
Seat change	▲14	▲1	▲4
Popular vote	115,396	56,998	27,395
Percentage	45.9%	22.7%	10.9%
Swing	▲6.7%	▼5.2%	▲6.3%
	Fourth party	Fifth party
Party	Labour	UKIP
Last election	22 seats, 26.6%	0 seats, 0.8%
Seats before	22	0
Seats won	3	1
Seat change	▼19	▲1
Popular vote	34,616	11,561
Percentage	13.5%	4.6%
Swing	▼13.1%	▲3.8%
- Map showing the results of the 2009 Norfolk County Council elections.
Party before election
Conservative
Elected Party
Conservative

The 2009 Norfolk County Council election took place on 4 June 2009, coinciding with local elections for all county councils in England.

The Conservative administration was re-elected with an increased majority and, as in Suffolk and Kent, the Liberal Democrats replaced Labour as the main opposition party.

The Conservatives increased their majority on the council from 10 to a comfortable 36 seats with a net gain of 14 seats. They held virtually all of their seats across the county, but made a net loss of 1 seat to the Liberal democrats in North Norfolk.

The Liberal Democrats performed well in the North Norfolk area through making a net gain of 1 against the Conservatives, and gaining Thetford West from Labour in Breckland, but lost seats to the conservatives in King's Lynn & West Norfolk and South Norfolk as the latter swept the board. Despite the party's flat-lining, they became the official opposition to the governing conservative administration.

Labour, just as had been the case across the rest of the country, suffered heavy losses to all parties and especially to the conservatives being left with just 3 seats across the county, being pushed in to 4th place behind the Green Party for the first time.

The Green Party made gains, particularly in Norwich where they won a majority of seats, which built upon their successes in city elections over the preceding years. They won more seats than labour across the county, but did not beat them in share of vote.

The United Kingdom Independence Party stood candidates in some seats, winning one in Great Yarmouth from Labour.

Other parties and independent candidates stood without winning seats and making little impact.

== Previous composition ==
=== 2005 election ===
Party	Seats
Conservative	46
Labour	22
Liberal Democrats	14
Green	2
Vacant	1
Total	84

=== Composition of council seats before election ===
Party	Seats
Conservative	46
Labour	22
Liberal Democrats	13
Green	3
Independent	1
Total	84

=== Changes between elections ===
In between the 2005 election and the 2009 election, the following council seats changed hands:

Division	Date	Previous Party	New Party	Cause	Resulting Council Composition				
Division	Date	Previous Party	New Party	Cause	Con	Lab	LDem	Grn	Ind
Town Close	26 May 2005	Vacant	Green	Election postponed due to the death of a candidate.	46	22	14	3	0
Clavering	3 May 2007	Liberal Democrats	Conservative	Liberal Democrats incumbent resigned. Conservatives won by-election.	47	22	13	3	0
Dersingham	2008/2009	Conservative	Independent	Councillor quit party to sit as an independent member.	46	22	13	3	1

== Results ==
Norfolk County Council election results 2009
Party	Seats	Gains	Losses	Net gain/loss	Seats %	Votes %	Votes	+/−
Conservative	60	17	3	+14	71.4	45.9	115,363	+6.7
Liberal Democrats	13	5	6	−1	15.5	22.7	57,053	−5.2
Labour	3	0	19	−19	3.6	13.5	33,930	−13.1
Green	7	5	0	+5	8.3	10.9	27,395	+6.3
UKIP	1	1	0	+1	1.2	4.6	11,561	+3.8
Independent	0	0	0	±0	0.0	1.4	3,518	
BNP	0	0	0	±0	0.0	0.9	2,262	
Total	84						251,082	

=== Election of Group Leaders ===
Daniel Cox (Humbleyard) was re-elected leader of the Conservative Group, Paul Morse (North Walsham East) was elected leader of the Liberal Democratic Group, Richard Bearman (Mancroft) was elected leader of the Green Party group and George Nobbs (Crome) became leader of the Labour Group now down to just 3 members.

=== Election of Leader of the Council ===
Daniel Cox the leader of the conservative group was duly re-elected leader of the council and formed a conservative administration.

He would unexpectedly resign in October 2010 and was replaced by his deputy Derrick Murphy (Freebridge Lynn)

Murphy himself would be forced to resign after a controversy emerged over an email which was sent by a political assistant to the Conservative group at County Hall, to BBC Radio Norfolk in April 2012, which suggested that the leader of West Norfolk Council, Nick Daubney and facing 'a serious leadership challenge' over King's Lynn incinerator, which had been a source of tension between the two Councils.

His deputy Bill Borrett (Elmham & Mattishall) replaced him.

== Results by district ==
Gains and losses are in comparison to the preceding full election in 2005, unless otherwise stated. Intervening by-elections are noted.

=== Breckland ===
Division results

Attleborough
Party	Candidate	Votes	%	±%
Conservative	Alec Byrne *	1,659	58.2	+12.9
Green	Tony Park	834	29.2	+29.2
Labour	Janet King	359	12.6	−17.6
Majority		825	28.9	+13.9
Turnout		2,852	33.7	−27.6
Conservative hold		Swing	−8.2	

Dereham North
Party	Candidate	Votes	%	±%
Conservative	Diana Irving	1,422	53.9	+14.7
Green	Ann Bowyer	774	29.3	+23.0
Labour	Tom Goreham	443	16.8	−15.3
Majority		648	24.6	+17.4
Turnout		2,639	35.1	−25.9
Conservative hold		Swing	−4.2	

Dereham South
Party	Candidate	Votes	%	±%
Conservative	Phillip Duigan	1,208	45.3	+8.3
Labour	Robin Goreham *	705	26.5	−14.5
Green	Timothy Birt	427	16.0	+10.8
Liberal Democrats	Pat Dore	325	12.2	−4.6
Majority		503	18.9	+15.0
Turnout		2,665	31.9	−28.5
Conservative gain from Labour		Swing	+11.4	

Elmham & Mattishall division
Party	Candidate	Votes	%	±%
Conservative	Bill Borrett	1,689	45.0	−3.5
Independent	Roger Atterwill	1,184	31.6	+31.6
Green	Steve Blake	558	14.9	+7.7
Labour	Linda Goreham	319	8.5	−17.4
Majority		505	13.5	−9.2
Turnout		3,750	43.9	−23.2
Conservative hold		Swing	−17.6	

Guiltcross
Party	Candidate	Votes	%	±%
Conservative	William Nunn	1,775	51.9	+2.8
Liberal Democrats	Stephen Gordon	599	17.5	−11.6
Green	Donna Park	433	12.7	+12.7
Independent	Colin Phillips	381	11.1	+11.1
Labour	Mark Allison	232	6.8	−15.0
Majority		1,176	34.4	+14.5
Turnout		3,420	42.9	−26.1
Conservative hold		Swing	+7.2	

Necton & Launditch
Party	Candidate	Votes	%	±%
Conservative	Mark Kiddle-Morris	2,261	61.7	+19.6
Liberal Democrats	Ann Gunner	875	23.9	+5.6
Labour	Michael Fanthorpe	530	14.5	−14.6
Majority		1,386	37.8	+24.8
Turnout		3,666	44.4	−26.5
Conservative hold		Swing	+7.0	

Swaffham
Party	Candidate	Votes	%	±%
Conservative	Ann Steward	1,440	53.1	+9.0
Liberal Democrats	Charles Gunner	507	18.7	−9.4
Green	Nigel Walker	438	16.1	+11.7
Labour	Sandra Kerridge	329	12.1	−11.3
Majority		933	34.4	+18.3
Turnout		2,714	37.4	−25.7
Conservative hold		Swing	+9.2	

The Brecks
Party	Candidate	Votes	%	±%
Conservative	Ian Monson *	2,612	79.7	+26.5
Labour	Dennis Sully	667	20.3	−4.5
Majority		1,945	59.3	+31.0
Turnout		3,279	38.5	−27.4
Conservative hold		Swing	+15.5	

Thetford East
Party	Candidate	Votes	%	±%
Conservative	Marion Chapman-Allen	1,036	49.6	+13.8
Liberal Democrats	Margaret Rutter	665	31.9	+14.7
Labour	Brenda Canham	387	18.5	−17.9
Majority		371	17.8	+17.1
Turnout		2,088	29.8	−28.0
Conservative gain from Labour		Swing	+15.9	

Thetford West
Party	Candidate	Votes	%	±%
Liberal Democrats	Mike Brindle	934	37.0	+13.7
Conservative	Robert Kybird	882	35.0	+6.1
Labour Co-op	Terry Jermy	706	23.0	−19.8
Majority		52	2.1	−16.9
Turnout		2,522	27.5	−23.6
Liberal Democrats gain from Labour		Swing	+16.7	

Watton
Party	Candidate	Votes	%	±%
Conservative	John Rogers *	1,843	76.6	+28.1
Labour	Chris Walls	562	23.4	−4.4
Majority		1,281	53.3	+32.4
Turnout		2,405	31.2	−25.9
Conservative hold		Swing	+16.2	

Yare & All Saints
Party	Candidate	Votes	%	±%
Conservative	Cliff Jordan *	2,186	79.2	+30.4
Labour	Julian Crutch	575	20.8	−3.9
Majority		1,611	58.4	+34.3
Turnout		2,761	38.3	−30.4
Conservative hold		Swing	+17.1	

=== Broadland ===
Division results

Acle
Party	Candidate	Votes	%	±%
Conservative	Brian Iles *	1,486	58.7	+16.8
Liberal Democrats	Jane Key	626	24.7	−1.5
Labour	Anthony Hemmingway	421	16.6	−15.3
Majority		859	34.0	+23.9
Turnout		2,532	38.4	−29.7
Conservative hold		Swing	+9.1	

Aylsham
Party	Candidate	Votes	%	±%
Liberal Democrats	David Harrison *	1,662	53.8	+16.4
Conservative	Ian Graham	1,218	39.4	+2.6
Labour	Deborah Kemp	210	6.8	−18.9
Majority		444	14.0	+13.8
Turnout		3,090	42.6	−27.5
Liberal Democrats hold		Swing	+6.9	

Blofield and Brundall
Party	Candidate	Votes	%	±%
Conservative	Andrew Proctor	1,947	63.6	+17.5
Liberal Democrats	Joyce Groves	768	25.1	−2.0
Labour	Christine Hemmingway	345	11.3	−15.5
Majority		1,179	38.5	+19.5
Turnout		3,060	42.8	−26.9
Conservative hold		Swing	+9.8	

Drayton and Horsford
Party	Candidate	Votes	%	±%
Conservative	Tony Adams *	1,302	49.5	+9.4
Liberal Democrats	Peter Sergeant	711	27.0	+0.1
Green	Rachel Heeds	408	15.5	+10.1
Labour	Michael Cox	212	8.1	−19.6
Majority		591	22.0	+10.1
Turnout		2,633	34.7	−28.9
Conservative hold		Swing	+4.6	

Hellesdon
Party	Candidate	Votes	%	±%
Conservative	Shelagh Gurney *	1,408	45.3	+8.8
UKIP	John Youles	592	19.0	+15.3
Liberal Democrats	Peter Fish	520	16.7	−12.2
Labour	Wendy Thorogood	364	11.7	−16.3
Green	Jennifer Parkhouse	225	7.2	+4.3
Majority		816	26.3	+18.7
Turnout		3,109	35.4	−30.3
Conservative hold		Swing	−3.2	

Hevingham and Spixworth
Party	Candidate	Votes	%	±%
Conservative	Tony Williams *	1,198	43.1	−1.0
Liberal Democrats	Daniel Roper	1,075	38.6	+13.4
Green	Susan Curran	332	11.9	+11.9
Labour	Richard Powell	178	6.4	−24.3
Majority		123	4.4	−9.0
Turnout		2,783	39.8	−27.6
Conservative hold		Swing	−7.2	

Old Catton
Party	Candidate	Votes	%	±%
Conservative	Stuart Dunn *	1,206	48.8	+8.9
UKIP	Susan Sadler	402	16.3	+16.3
Liberal Democrats	Nigel Steane	334	13.5	−9.2
Labour	Kenneth Lashley	267	10.8	−21.7
Green	Thomas Wedge-Roberts	262	10.6	+5.8
Majority		804	32.5	+25.1
Turnout		2,471	38.3	−29.8
Conservative hold		Swing	−3.7	

At a by-election held on 14 July 2011, Old Catton was retained by the Conservatives.

Reepham
Party	Candidate	Votes	%	±%
Liberal Democrats	James Joyce *	1,426	52.5	+9.4
Conservative	Simon Woodbridge	1,120	41.2	+4.3
Labour	Christopher Jones	173	6.4	−13.7
Majority		306	11.3	+5.1
Turnout		2,719	43.3	−24.9
Liberal Democrats hold		Swing	+2.5	

Sprowston
Party	Candidate	Votes	%	±%
Conservative	John Ward	1,123	32.4	+4.0
UKIP	Glenn Tingle	663	19.1	+19.1
Labour	Barbara Lashley *	593	17.1	−17.1
Liberal Democrats	Corrine Russen	564	16.3	−17.2
Green	James Dexter	298	8.6	+4.6
BNP	Julia Howman	228	6.7	+6.7
Majority		460	13.3	+12.5
Turnout		3,469	37.2	−29.1
Conservative gain from Labour		Swing	+10.6	

Taverham
Party	Candidate	Votes	%	±%
Conservative	Stuart Clancy	1,554	57.3	+13.6
Liberal Democrats	Julia Holland	562	20.7	−0.8
Green	Ben Duffy	334	12.3	+6.0
Labour	Jason Bill	261	9.6	−18.8
Majority		992	35.6	+21.3
Turnout		2,711	36.0	−30.2
Conservative hold		Swing	+7.2	

Thorpe St Andrew
Party	Candidate	Votes	%	±%
Conservative	Ian Mackie *	1,627	57.8	+12.3
Liberal Democrats	Phyllida Scrivens	502	17.8	−3.1
Green	Nicholas Caistor	383	13.6	+7.4
Labour	Lesley Barrett	304	10.8	−16.5
Majority		1,125	40.0	+21.8
Turnout		2,816	37.8	−28.4
Conservative hold		Swing	+7.7	

Woodside
Party	Candidate	Votes	%	±%
Conservative	Nigel Shaw *	1,202	48.6	+9.0
Liberal Democrats	Sylvia Cannon	456	18.4	+2.6
Labour	Pam Harwood	447	18.1	−20.8
Green	Christopher Webb	369	14.9	+9.2
Majority		746	30.2	+29.4
Turnout		2474	38.8	−28.4
Conservative hold		Swing	+3.2	

Wroxham
Party	Candidate	Votes	%	±%
Conservative	James Carswell	1,788	56.5	+17.3
Green	Nick Ball	603	19.0	+14.9
Liberal Democrats	Veronica Beadle	485	15.3	−0.8
Labour	Malcolm Kemp	291	9.2	−8.5
Majority		1,185	37.4	+16.0
Turnout		3,167	40.7	−28.9
Conservative hold		Swing	+1.2	

=== Great Yarmouth ===
Division results

Breydon division
Party	Candidate	Votes	%
Conservative	Graham Robert Plant	960	35.22
Labour	Trevor John Wainwright *	891	32.69
UKIP	Wayne Paul Beckett	675	24.76
Green	Karen Marie Groom	200	7.34
Majority		69	2.53
Turnout		2,726	32.11
Conservative gain from Labour			

Caister-on-Sea division
Party	Candidate	Votes	%
Conservative	Ronald Charles Hanton	1,480	54.03
Labour	Patrick Thaine Hacon *	786	28.70
Liberal Democrats	Richard Payne Harbord	473	17.27
Majority		694	25.34
Turnout		2,739	38.38
Conservative gain from Labour			

East Flegg division
Party	Candidate	Votes	%
Conservative	James Robert Shrimplin *	1,772	59.89
Green	Andrew Mark Taylor	431	14.57
Liberal Democrats	Rodney Alec Cole	419	14.16
Labour	Nicholas Dack	337	11.39
Majority		1,341	45.32
Turnout		2,959	40.57
Conservative hold			

Gorleston St Andrews division
Party	Candidate	Votes	%
Conservative	Bertie James Edmund Collins *	1,223	48.47
UKIP	Alan James Baugh	728	28.85
Labour	Christine Williamson	572	22.67
Majority		495	19.62
Turnout		2,523	33.55
Conservative hold			

Lothingland division
Party	Candidate	Votes	%
Conservative	Patrick Gerald Cook	1,326	45.43
UKIP	Colin Aldred	948	32.48
Labour	Brian Walker *	645	22.10
Majority		378	12.95
Turnout		2,919	34.22
Conservative gain from Labour			

At a by-election on 5 May 2011, Lothingland was retained by the Conservatives.

Magdalen division
Party	Candidate	Votes	%
Labour	Colleen Walker *	917	36.10
Conservative	Patricia Elizabeth Page	861	33.90
UKIP	Karl Julian Ruane	762	30.0
Majority		56	2.20
Turnout		2,540	30.93
Labour hold			

West Flegg division
Party	Candidate	Votes	%
Conservative	Michael Carttiss *	1,331	58.84
Liberal Democrats	Pamela Mayhew	651	28.78
Labour	Katie James	280	12.38
Majority		680	30.06
Turnout		2,262	38.33
Conservative hold			

Yarmouth Nelson and Southtown division
Party	Candidate	Votes	%
UKIP	Rex Edgar Parkinson-Hare	779	38.34
Labour	John Alfred Holmes *	702	34.55
Conservative	Matthew James Smith	551	27.12
Majority		77	3.79
Turnout		2,032	21.98
UKIP gain from Labour			

Yarmouth North and Central division
Party	Candidate	Votes	%
Conservative	Thomas Steven Charles Garrod	1,001	34.14
Labour	Michael Taylor *	856	29.20
UKIP	Paul Andrew Baugh	549	18.72
Liberal Democrats	Anthony John Harris	278	9.48
BNP	David George Rand	248	8.46
Majority		145	4.95
Turnout		2,932	32.16
Conservative gain from Labour			

=== King's Lynn and West Norfolk ===
Division results

Clenchwarton & King's Lynn South division
Party	Candidate	Votes	%
Conservative	David Harwood	1,015	39.25
Liberal Democrats	Judith Brown *	743	28.73
BNP	Matthew Gant	313	12.10
Labour	Margaret Rose Wilkinson	301	11.64
Green	John Andrew Edmund Belfield	214	8.28
Majority		272	10.52
Turnout		2,586	34.89
Conservative gain from Liberal Democrats			

At a by-election on 27 September 2012, Clenchwarton and King's Lynn South was won by the Labour Party.

Dersingham division
Party	Candidate	Votes	%
Conservative	John Dobson	1,648	43.18
Independent	Janice Eells *	800	20.96
Liberal Democrats	Kate Sayer	614	16.09
Labour	Richard William Pennington	438	11.47
Green	David John Rogers	317	8.30
Majority		848	22.22
Turnout		3,817	44.02
Conservative hold			

Docking division
Party	Candidate	Votes	%
Conservative	Michael John Baylis Chenery of Horsbrugh	1,833	55.55
Liberal Democrats	Colin Sayer	537	16.27
Green	Benedict Patrick Butler	492	14.91
Labour	Ian Gourlay	438	13.27
Majority		1,296	39.27
Turnout		3,300	40.13
Conservative hold			

Downham Market division
Party	Candidate	Votes	%
Conservative	Shelagh Elizabeth Lucy Hutson *	1,660	60.54
Labour	Johnathan Toye	432	15.75
Liberal Democrats	Teresa Dawn Brandon	365	13.31
Green	Frank Federick Abel	285	10.39
Majority		1,228	44.78
Turnout		2,742	36.63
Conservative hold			

Feltwell division
Party	Candidate	Votes	%
Conservative	Tony White *	1,835	54.76
Liberal Democrats	Carol Ann Nicholas-Letch	732	21.84
Green	Andrew John Smith	547	16.32
Labour	Albert Paines	237	7.07
Majority		1,103	32.92
Turnout		3,351	36.68
Conservative hold			

Fincham division
Party	Candidate	Votes	%
Conservative	Richard Rockcliffe *	2,132	66.71
Liberal Democrats	John Nicholas-Letch	705	22.06
Labour	Steve Richard Everett	359	11.23
Majority		1,427	44.65
Turnout		3,196	38.52
Conservative hold			

Freebridge Lynn division
Party	Candidate	Votes	%
Conservative	Derrick Murphy	1,690	54.50
Liberal Democrats	Mark Seaman	431	13.90
Green	Michael De Whalley	385	12.42
Labour	Christopher John Bunting	347	11.19
BNP	Ronald Barnes	248	8.00
Majority		1,259	40.60
Turnout		3,101	41.90
Conservative hold			

Gayton & Nar Valley division
Party	Candidate	Votes	%
Conservative	Janet Ann Murphy	1,856	60.75
Green	Lori Allen	739	24.19
Labour	Gwyneth Eve Thorneywork	460	15.06
Majority		1,117	36.56
Turnout		3,055	38.38
Conservative hold			

Gaywood North & Central division
Party	Candidate	Votes	%
Conservative	Jean Mickleburgh	1,090	42.38
Labour	Alexandra Elvina Kemp	445	17.30
Liberal Democrats	Ian Swinton	369	14.35
BNP	Edith Crowther	346	13.45
Green	David Lefever	322	12.52
Majority		645	25.08
Turnout		2,572	34.43
Conservative gain from Labour			

Gaywood South division
Party	Candidate	Votes	%
Conservative	Michael Collins Langwade	865	32.08
Labour	Charles Edward Joyce *	551	20.44
Liberal Democrats	John Loveless	435	16.14
UKIP	Michael Stone	376	13.95
BNP	Christine Ann Kelly	273	10.13
Green	Vivienne Jane Manning	196	7.27
Majority		314	11.65
Turnout		2,696	28.57
Conservative gain from Labour			

King's Lynn North & Central division
Party	Candidate	Votes	%
Conservative	Brian Winston Charles Long	677	32.66
Labour	John Leonard Collop	616	29.72
BNP	David Alexander Fleming	431	20.79
Green	Johnathan Priestley Burr	349	16.84
Majority		61	2.94
Turnout		2,073	26.63
Conservative gain from Labour			

Marshland North division
Party	Candidate	Votes	%
Conservative	Tony Wright *	1,881	79.74
Labour	Mark Lachlan Daspa Anderson	478	20.26
Majority		1,403	59.47
Turnout		2,359	31.40
Conservative hold			

Marshland South division
Party	Candidate	Votes	%
Conservative	Harry Humphrey *	1,628	51.0
Independent	David Peter Barnard	599	18.77
Green	Ian Massingham	383	12.0
Independent	David Dennis Markinson	241	7.55
Labour	Helen Scott	229	7.17
Independent	James Van Der Velde	112	3.51
Majority		1,029	32.24
Turnout		3,192	33.51
Conservative hold			

North Coast division
Party	Candidate	Votes	%
Conservative	Stephen Bett *	2,152	62.83
Liberal Democrats	Paul Richard Burall	444	12.96
Green	Adam Watson	436	12.73
Labour	John Raymond Barnett Crisford	393	11.47
Majority		1,708	49.87
Turnout		3,425	41.74
Conservative hold			

=== North Norfolk ===
Division results

Cromer division
Party	Candidate	Votes	%
Conservative	Hilary Thompson	1,463	41.97
Liberal Democrats	Penny Bevan Jones	1,127	32.33
UKIP	Bob Russell	666	19.10
Labour	Colin John Vanlint	230	6.60
Majority		336	9.64
Turnout		3,486	43.24
Conservative gain from Liberal Democrats			

Fakenham division
Party	Candidate	Votes	%
Liberal Democrats	David Robert Callaby *	1,452	51.56
Conservative	John Victor Rest	1,085	38.53
Labour	Brenda Mary Coldrick	279	9.91
Majority		367	13.03
Turnout		2,816	35.51
Liberal Democrats hold			

Holt division
Party	Candidate	Votes	%
Conservative	John Hase Perry-Warnes *	1,558	38.79
UKIP	Michael John Morton Baker	1,073	26.72
Liberal Democrats	Jacqueline Ann Howe	1,058	26.34
Green	Paula Mary D'Attoma	222	5.53
Labour	John Rowley	105	2.61
Majority		485	12.08
Turnout		4,016	54.43
Conservative hold			

Hoveton & Stalham division
Party	Candidate	Votes	%
Conservative	Nigel David Dixon	1,381	49.84
Liberal Democrats	Candy Paula Sheridan	1,171	42.26
Labour Co-op	David Russell	219	7.90
Majority		210	7.58
Turnout		2,771	41.49
Conservative hold			

Melton Constable division
Party	Candidate	Votes	%
Conservative	Russell John Wright	1,415	40.88
Liberal Democrats	Barbara Helen Rix	1,015	29.33
UKIP	Terry Cox	532	15.37
Green	Sharon Harvey	317	9.16
Labour	Timothy John Bartlett	182	5.26
Majority		400	11.56
Turnout		3,461	46.88
Conservative gain from Liberal Democrats			

Mundesley division
Party	Candidate	Votes	%
Liberal Democrats	Graham Robert Jones	1,919	54.64
Conservative	Alistair James MacKay	1,416	40.32
Labour Co-op	David Gregory Spencer	177	5.04
Majority		503	14.32
Turnout		3,512	48.60
Liberal Democrats gain from Conservative			

North Walsham East division
Party	Candidate	Votes	%
Liberal Democrats	Paul Donald Morse *	1,909	52.40
Conservative	Carole Irene Bullinger	880	24.16
UKIP	Charles Edward Cole	464	12.74
Green	Joanne Todd	201	5.52
Labour	Nicola Kate Mortin	189	5.19
Majority		1,029	28.25
Turnout		3,643	41.53
Liberal Democrats hold			

North Walsham West & Erpingham division
Party	Candidate	Votes	%
Liberal Democrats	Diana Clarke	1,675	53.91
Conservative	Peter Joseph Willcox	1,214	39.07
Labour Co-op	Phil Harris	218	7.02
Majority		461	14.84
Turnout		3,107	44.08
Liberal Democrats hold			

Sheringham division
Party	Candidate	Votes	%
Liberal Democrats	Brian John Hannah *	1,835	59.12
Conservative	Madeleine Barbara Ashcroft	1,140	36.73
Labour Co-op	Don Batts	129	4.16
Majority		695	22.39
Turnout		3,104	45.31
Liberal Democrats hold			

South Smallburgh division
Party	Candidate	Votes	%
Liberal Democrats	Paul Kenneth Rice	1,283	38.67
Conservative	Lorraine Marie West	1,144	34.48
UKIP	Jeff Parkes	693	20.89
Labour	Sheila Ann Cullingham	198	5.97
Majority		139	4.19
Turnout		3,318	46.31
Liberal Democrats gain from Conservative			

Wells division
Party	Candidate	Votes	%
Liberal Democrats	Marie Strong	1,650	50.32
Conservative	Garry James Sandell	1,348	41.11
Labour	Mike Gates	281	8.57
Majority		302	9.21
Turnout		3,279	47.17
Liberal Democrats gain from Conservative			

=== Norwich ===
Division results

Bowthorpe division
Party	Candidate	Votes	%
Conservative	Paul Anthony George Wells	926	35.60
Labour	Jo Storie	670	25.76
Liberal Democrats	Dave Thomas	626	24.07
Green	Christine Patricia Way	379	14.57
Majority		256	9.84
Turnout		2,601	31.60
Conservative gain from Labour			

Catton Grove division
Party	Candidate	Votes	%
Conservative	Charlotte Louise Casimir	724	29.53
Labour	Brian Morrey *	606	24.71
UKIP	Ann Doris Williams	449	18.31
Green	Penny Edwards	416	16.97
Liberal Democrats	Adrian Christopher Thomas	257	10.48
Majority		118	4.81
Turnout		2,452	31.95
Conservative gain from Labour			

Crome division
Party	Candidate	Votes	%
Labour	George Nobbs *	811	33.48
Conservative	Jonathan James Emsell	712	29.40
Green	Penelope Mary Killingbeck	518	21.39
Liberal Democrats	Dal Dewgarde	381	15.73
Majority		99	4.09
Turnout		2,422	34.55
Labour hold			

Eaton division
Party	Candidate	Votes	%
Liberal Democrats	Mervyn John Scutter *	1,688	41.50
Conservative	Niall Baxter	1,501	36.91
Green	Jean Kathleen Bishop	527	12.96
Labour	Christopher Harold Knapp	351	8.63
Majority		187	4.60
Turnout		4,067	57.19
Liberal Democrats hold			

Lakenham division
Party	Candidate	Votes	%
Liberal Democrats	Fiona Clare Williamson	877	31.65
Labour	Susan Jane Whitaker *	743	26.81
UKIP	Steve Emmens	437	15.77
Conservative	Christopher David Benjamin	361	13.03
Green	Lee Claire Cozens	353	12.74
Majority		134	4.84
Turnout		2,771	39.47
Liberal Democrats gain from Labour			

At a by-election on 24 November 2011, Lakenham was regained by the Labour Party.

Mancroft division
Party	Candidate	Votes	%
Green	Richard Andrew Bearman	1,123	41.86
Liberal Democrats	Simon Richard Nobbs	535	19.94
Conservative	Suzanne Amy Pulford	515	19.19
Labour	David Fullman	510	19.01
Majority		588	21.92
Turnout		2683	35.98
Green gain from Labour			

Mile Cross division
Party	Candidate	Votes	%
Green	Richard Alan Edwards	620	29.54
Labour	Peter John Harwood *	614	29.25
Conservative	Clive Smith	547	26.06
Liberal Democrats	Peter Balcombe	318	15.15
Majority		6	0.29
Turnout		2099	28.43
Green gain from Labour			

Nelson division
Party	Candidate	Votes	%
Green	Andrew Philip Boswell *	2,103	63.75
Labour	Gemma Rose Ricketts	421	12.76
Liberal Democrats	Gordon Dean	420	12.73
Conservative	Stefan Richard Rose	355	10.76
Majority		1,682	50.99
Turnout		3,299	45.48
Green hold			

Sewell division
Party	Candidate	Votes	%
Green	Jennifer Susan Toms	826	32.62
Labour	Cath Ward *	676	26.70
Conservative	David John Mackie	553	21.84
Liberal Democrats	Ian Williams	477	18.84
Majority		150	5.92
Turnout		2,532	34.08
Green gain from Labour			

Thorpe Hamlet division
Party	Candidate	Votes	%
Green	Philip Allan Hardy	1,371	46.16
Liberal Democrats	David John Munday	620	20.88
Conservative	Matthew Simon Davison	573	19.29
Labour	Cym Cant	406	13.67
Majority		751	25.29
Turnout		2,970	37.18
Green gain from Liberal Democrats			

Town Close division
Party	Candidate	Votes	%
Green	Stephen Ralph Little	1,528	42.69
Liberal Democrats	Victor Keith Scrivens	859	24.0
Conservative	Tak-Man Li	716	20.01
Labour	Andreas Kevin Paterson	476	13.30
Majority		669	18.69
Turnout		3,579	44.45
Green hold			

University division
Party	Candidate	Votes	%
Labour	Bert Bremner	1,047	40.68
Green	Steven Martin Altman	914	35.51
Conservative	Mark Nigel Edward Patrick	342	13.29
Liberal Democrats	Andrew Norris Wright	271	10.53
Majority		133	5.17
Turnout		2574	34.01
Labour hold			

Wensum division
Party	Candidate	Votes	%
Green	Marcus Hemsley	1,260	49.39
Labour	Vaughan Thomas	561	21.99
Conservative	Mike Gillespie	445	17.44
Liberal Democrats	Haydn Perrett	285	11.17
Majority		699	27.40
Turnout		2,551	31.90
Green gain from Labour			

=== South Norfolk ===
Division results

Clavering division
Party	Candidate	Votes	%
Conservative	Tony Tomkinson *	1,492	39.59
Liberal Democrats	Amanda Anne Smith	989	26.24
UKIP	David Gifford	653	17.33
Green	Derek William West	405	10.75
Labour	John Shanahan	230	6.10
Majority		503	13.35
Turnout		3,769	44.90
Conservative gain from Liberal Democrats			

Costessey division
Party	Candidate	Votes	%
Liberal Democrats	Tim East *	1,768	54.80
Conservative	Simon Richard Squire	797	24.71
Green	Martin Alan Peek	439	13.61
Labour	Cid Gibbs	222	6.88
Majority		971	30.10
Turnout		3,226	37.61
Liberal Democrats hold			

Diss & Roydon division
Party	Candidate	Votes	%
Conservative	Jenny Chamberlin *	1,563	57.02
Liberal Democrats	Trevor Leonard Wenman	978	35.68
Labour	Andy Barrett	200	7.30
Majority		585	21.34
Turnout		2,741	36.53
Conservative hold			

East Depwade division
Party	Candidate	Votes	%
Conservative	Martin James Wilby	1,565	51.99
Liberal Democrats	John Francis Pitt-Pladdy *	1,263	41.96
Labour	Thomas Clennell	182	6.05
Majority		302	10.03
Turnout		3,010	41.67
Conservative gain from Liberal Democrats			

Forehoe division
Party	Candidate	Votes	%
Conservative	Jon Herbert	1,769	50.27
Liberal Democrats	Bob McClenning	1,156	32.85
Green	Roy Arthur Walmsley	403	11.45
Labour	Tracey Jane Lucy Richardson	191	5.43
Majority		613	17.42
Turnout		3,519	44.90
Conservative hold			

Henstead division
Party	Candidate	Votes	%
Conservative	Roger Ackworth Smith	1,646	49.22
Liberal Democrats	Alistair Barber Miller	1,032	30.86
Green	Sandra Browne	422	12.62
Labour	Nicola Jeannette Fowler	244	7.30
Majority		614	18.36
Turnout		3,344	47.56
Conservative hold			

Hingham division
Party	Candidate	Votes	%
Conservative	Steve Dorrington *	1,620	56.70
Liberal Democrats	Jeremy Dore	998	34.93
Labour	Kevin Patrick O'Grady	239	8.37
Majority		622	21.77
Turnout		2,857	44.62
Conservative hold			

Humbleyard division
Party	Candidate	Votes	%
Conservative	Daniel Richard Cox *	1,925	51.94
Liberal Democrats	Jacky Sutton	911	24.58
Green	Jan Kitchener	573	15.46
Labour	Marian Chapman	297	8.01
Majority		1,014	27.36
Turnout		3,706	46.91
Conservative hold			

At a by-election on 13 January 2011, the Conservatives retained Humbleyard.

Loddon division
Party	Candidate	Votes	%
Conservative	Adrian John Gunson *	3,087	77.62
Liberal Democrats	Jane Helen Walker	481	12.09
Labour	Timothy Michael Sanders	233	5.86
Independent	Ingo Wagenknecht	176	4.43
Majority		2,606	65.53
Turnout		3,977	48.80
Conservative hold			

Long Stratton division
Party	Candidate	Votes	%
Conservative	Alison Mary Thomas	1,839	57.63
Liberal Democrats	Marian Jean Miller	1,116	34.97
Labour	Sally Blaikie	236	7.40
Majority		723	22.66
Turnout		3,191	42.49
Conservative hold			

West Depwade division
Party	Candidate	Votes	%
Conservative	Beverley Herbert Allison Spratt *	2,618	64.50
Liberal Democrats	Bodo Rissman	1,136	27.99
Labour	Cecila Da Fonseca	305	7.51
Majority		1,482	36.51
Turnout		4,059	46.87
Conservative hold			

Wymondham division
Party	Candidate	Votes	%
Conservative	Joe Mooney	2,503	63.42
Liberal Democrats	Tim Sutton-Day	670	16.97
Green	Andrew John Mitchell	426	10.79
Labour	John Lessels Cowan	348	8.82
Majority		1,833	46.44
Turnout		3,947	44.33
Conservative hold			
