= 2001 Norfolk County Council election =

2001 UK local government election

← 1997	7 June 2001	2005 →

All 84 council division seats 43 seats needed for a majority
- Registered: 621,430 (▲2.3%)
- Turnout: 63.3% (▼10.2%)

	First party	Second party	Third party
Party	Conservative	Labour	Liberal Democrats
Last election	36 seats, 35.1%	34 seats, 37.1%	13 seats, 24.4%
Seats won	48	26	10
Seat change	▲12	▼8	▼3
Popular vote	158,361	125,620	90,544
Percentage	40.2%	31.9%	23.0%
Swing	▲5.2%	▼5.2%	▼1.4%
Party before election
No Overall Control
Elected Party
Conservative

The 2001 Norfolk County Council election took place on 7 June 2001, coinciding with local elections for county councils in England and the 2001 general election.

== Summary ==
The Conservatives returned to office with a majority of 12 seats, with Labour losing 8 seats and the Lib Dems losing 3, and went on to rule for three consecutive terms until narrowly losing power in 2013.

The Greens contested every seat for the first time and there were no independents elected for the first time since 1989.

=== Election results ===
2001 Norfolk County Council election
Party	Candidates	Seats	Gains	Losses	Net gain/loss	Seats %	Votes %	Votes	+/−
Conservative	84	48	12	0	▲12	57.1	40.2	158,414	+5.1
Labour	82	26	0	8	▼8	31.0	31.9	125,620	–5.2
Liberal Democrats	79	10	2	5	▼3	11.9	23.0	90,544	–1.4
Green	84	0	0	0	Steady	0.0	4.2	16,457	+2.9
Independent	3	0	0	1	▼1	0.0	0.6	2,549	–1.5

=== Election of Group Leaders ===
Alison King (Humbleyard) was re-elected leader of the Conservative Group, Celia Cameron (St. Stephen) remained leader of the Labour Group and Barbara Hacker (Thorpe Hamlet) was elected leader of the Liberal Democratic Group.

=== Election of Leader of the Council ===
Alison King (Humbleyard) the leader of the Conservative group was duly elected leader of the council and formed a Conservative administration.

== Division results by local authority ==
=== Breckland ===
Breckland District Summary
Party	Seats	+/-	Votes	%	+/-
Conservative	9	▲1	25,965	46.2	+6.5
Labour	2	▼1	19,171	34.1	–2.7
Liberal Democrats	0	Steady	8,041	14.3	–3.4
Green	0	Steady	3,013	5.4	+3.2
Total	11	Steady	56,190	63.3	–9.0
Registered electors			88,735	–	+3.1

Division results

Attleborough
Party	Candidate	Votes	%	±%
Conservative	Alexander Byrne *	3,195	50.9	+3.1
Labour	Robert Smith	2,025	32.2	–1.2
Liberal Democrats	C. Saville	825	13.1	–5.7
Green	Tony Park	238	3.8	N/A
Majority		1,170	18.6	+4.2
Turnout		6,283	60.9	–11.1
Registered electors		10,315		
Conservative hold		Swing	▲2.2	

Dereham East
Party	Candidate	Votes	%	±%
Conservative	Clifton Jordan	2,198	44.6	+6.9
Labour	Michael Fanthorpe	1,863	37.8	–1.8
Liberal Democrats	P. Kane	653	13.3	–4.4
Green	Jasmine Park	209	4.2	–0.8
Majority		335	6.8	N/A
Turnout		4,923	61.6	–10.5
Registered electors		7,998		
Conservative gain from Labour		Swing	▲4.4	

Dereham West
Party	Candidate	Votes	%	±%
Conservative	John Gretton	2,449	41.5	+2.1
Labour	Robin Goreham	2,273	38.5	+3.9
Liberal Democrats	Bertram Shelley	866	14.7	–3.3
Green	Ann Bowyer	310	5.3	–2.7
Majority		176	3.0	–1.8
Turnout		5,898	63.9	–6.3
Registered electors		9,228		
Conservative hold		Swing	▼0.9	

Elmham & Mattishall
Party	Candidate	Votes	%	±%
Conservative	Ingrid Floering-Blackman *	2,873	51.7	+1.3
Labour	John Mallen	1,731	31.1	+0.7
Liberal Democrats	Edward Blane	701	12.6	–1.6
Green	Timothy Birt	255	4.6	–0.3
Majority		1,142	20.5	+0.6
Turnout		5,560	67.7	–7.8
Registered electors		8,214		
Conservative hold		Swing	▲0.3	

Guiltcross
Party	Candidate	Votes	%	±%
Conservative	John Baskerville *	2,468	49.8	+3.8
Labour	D. Griffith	1,321	26.7	–8.6
Liberal Democrats	Stephen Gordon	758	15.3	–3.3
Green	D. Cousins	406	8.2	N/A
Majority		1,147	23.2	+12.5
Turnout		4,953	67.8	–7.1
Registered electors		7,307		
Conservative hold		Swing	▲6.2	

Necton & Launditch
Party	Candidate	Votes	%	±%
Conservative	Christopher Lloyd-Owen	2,701	47.9	–0.1
Labour	Christopher Holland	2,050	36.4	–0.4
Liberal Democrats	P. Atkins	600	10.6	–0.2
Green	Alison Keidan-Cooper	288	5.1	+0.7
Majority		651	11.5	+0.8
Turnout		5,639	70.0	–4.9
Registered electors		8,053		
Conservative hold		Swing	▲0.2	

Swaffham
Party	Candidate	Votes	%	±%
Conservative	Shirley Matthews	2,252	47.0	+2.0
Labour	R. Baldwin	1,405	29.3	–11.6
Liberal Democrats	H. Neale	984	20.5	+6.4
Green	N. Walker	149	3.1	N/A
Majority		847	17.7	+13.7
Turnout		4,790	64.0	–8.6
Registered electors		7,483		
Conservative hold		Swing	▲6.8	

Thetford East
Party	Candidate	Votes	%	±%
Labour	Colin Armes *	2,647	54.1	+8.0
Conservative	John Nunn	1,919	39.3	N/A
Green	L. Milsom	323	6.6	N/A
Majority		728	14.9	+9.3
Turnout		4,889	57.1	–12.7
Registered electors		8,562		
Labour hold		Swing		

Thetford West
Party	Candidate	Votes	%	±%
Labour	Thelma Paines *	1,555	51.7	–2.8
Conservative	D. Williams	900	29.9	+7.1
Liberal Democrats	Daniel Jeffrey	442	14.7	–8.0
Green	D. Chapman	109	3.6	N/A
Majority		655	21.8	–9.9
Turnout		3,006	52.4	–11.9
Registered electors		5,738		
Labour hold		Swing	▼5.0	

Watton
Party	Candidate	Votes	%	±%
Conservative	John Rogers *	2,475	46.8	+2.3
Liberal Democrats	Keith Gilbert	1,581	29.9	+2.9
Labour	Gary Greenwood	992	18.8	–9.7
Green	Andrew Mitchell	238	4.5	N/A
Majority		894	16.9	+0.9
Turnout		5,286	63.5	–7.1
Registered electors		8,291		
Conservative hold		Swing	▼0.3	

Wissey
Party	Candidate	Votes	%	±%
Conservative	Ian Monson	2,535	51.1	+4.7
Labour	Dennis Sully	1,309	26.4	–5.8
Liberal Democrats	R. Green	631	12.7	–8.7
Green	Christine Dack	488	9.8	N/A
Majority		1,226	24.7	+10.5
Turnout		4,963	65.8	–7.7
Registered electors		7,546		
Conservative hold		Swing	▲5.3	

=== Broadland ===
Broadland District Summary
Party	Seats	+/-	Votes	%	+/-
Conservative	10	▲1	25,776	41.7	+1.0
Labour	1	▼1	20,511	33.3	1.4
Liberal Democrats	1	Steady	12,956	21.0	–1.6
Green	0	Steady	1,936	3.1	+1.9
Independent	0	Steady	529	0.9	+0.3
Total	12	Steady	61,658	65.1	–11.8
Registered electors			94,708	–	+4.7

Division results

Acle
Party	Candidate	Votes	%	±%
Conservative	Brian Iles	1,765	37.4	–2.5
Labour	Elsie Grimson	1,573	33.4	–7.5
Liberal Democrats	Michael Blake	720	15.3	–1.8
Independent	David Teager	529	11.2	N/A
Green	Janette Sammonds	126	2.7	+0.6
Majority		192	4.1	N/A
Turnout		4,713	68.5	–8.2
Registered electors		6,884		
Conservative gain from Labour		Swing	▼2.5	

Aylsham
Party	Candidate	Votes	%	±%
Conservative	Derek Turnbull *	2,311	42.9	+3.8
Labour	Deborah Kemp	1,945	36.1	–2.0
Liberal Democrats	Joyce Groves	908	16.9	–3.2
Green	Jennifer Morgan	217	4.0	+1.3
Majority		366	6.8	+5.8
Turnout		5,381	66.8	–9.5
Registered electors		8,055		
Conservative hold		Swing	▲2.9	

Blofield & Brundall
Party	Candidate	Votes	%	±%
Conservative	Christian Mowle *	2,833	48.3	+4.2
Labour	Anthony Hemmingway	1,792	30.6	+0.6
Liberal Democrats	Philip Matthew	1,017	17.4	–6.4
Green	Janet Thompson	219	3.7	+1.6
Majority		1,041	17.8	+3.7
Turnout		5,861	69.5	–9.2
Registered electors		8,439		
Conservative hold		Swing	▲1.8	

Hellesdon
Party	Candidate	Votes	%	±%
Conservative	Shelagh Gurney	1,619	40.1	–1.2
Labour	Wendy Thorogood	1,234	30.5	–5.9
Liberal Democrats	Peter Balcombe	1,080	26.7	+4.4
Green	F. Abel	107	2.6	N/A
Majority		385	9.5	+4.6
Turnout		4,040	63.7	–14.5
Registered electors		6,347		
Conservative hold		Swing	▲2.4	

Horsford
Party	Candidate	Votes	%	±%
Conservative	Anthony Adams *	1,713	38.4	+3.0
Labour	N. Ireland	1,361	30.5	–2.1
Liberal Democrats	David McRoberts	1,288	28.9	–1.2
Green	M. Cara	96	2.2	+0.4
Majority		352	7.9	+5.0
Turnout		4,458	61.7	–13.5
Registered electors		7,228		
Conservative hold		Swing	▲2.5	

Old Catton
Party	Candidate	Votes	%	±%
Conservative	Leslie Austin *	2,121	41.8	–1.5
Labour	Trevor Burrows	1,873	36.9	+0.3
Liberal Democrats	J. Dickerson	947	18.7	–1.3
Green	J. Cox	136	2.7	N/A
Majority		248	4.9	–1.8
Turnout		5,077	66.1	–11.2
Registered electors		7,684		
Conservative hold		Swing	▼0.9	

Reepham
Party	Candidate	Votes	%	±%
Conservative	Brenda Ravencroft *	1,973	42.4	–0.3
Liberal Democrats	Stuart Beadle	1,261	27.1	+5.6
Labour	Terry Glasspole	1,177	25.3	–6.5
Green	Martyn Street	247	5.3	+1.2
Majority		712	15.3	+4.4
Turnout		4,658	68.2	–9.1
Registered electors		6,827		
Conservative hold		Swing	▼3.0	

Sprowston
Party	Candidate	Votes	%	±%
Liberal Democrats	Dalmaine Dewgarde *	1,879	36.9	+0.4
Labour	Clifford Cutting	1,630	32.0	–1.7
Conservative	Roger Foulger	1,476	29.0	–0.9
Green	Roderick Kerr	112	2.2	N/A
Majority		249	4.9	+2.1
Turnout		5,097	64.2	–14.0
Registered electors		7,939		
Liberal Democrats hold		Swing	▲1.1	

Taverham
Party	Candidate	Votes	%	±%
Conservative	Evelyn Collishaw *	3,215	45.6	+2.9
Labour	Vernon Pennells	2,512	35.6	+5.5
Liberal Democrats	Dawn Lister	1,203	17.0	–4.6
Green	S. Roennene	128	1.8	N/A
Majority		703	10.0	–2.6
Turnout		7,058	59.5	–16.6
Registered electors		11,861		
Conservative hold		Swing	▼1.3	

Thorpe St Andrew
Party	Candidate	Votes	%	±%
Conservative	Rodney Clayton *	2,633	43.6	±0.0
Labour	Susan Eltringham	2,185	36.2	–1.9
Liberal Democrats	Martin Callam	1,006	16.7	–1.5
Green	H. Smith	216	3.6	N/A
Majority		448	7.4	+1.9
Turnout		6,040	62.6	–13.9
Registered electors		9,656		
Conservative hold		Swing	▲1.0	

Woodside
Party	Candidate	Votes	%	±%
Labour	Peter Harwood *	1,813	40.5	+0.9
Conservative	Malcolm Raymer	1,752	39.2	+0.7
Liberal Democrats	Ann Wright	818	18.3	–3.6
Green	O. White	89	2.0	N/A
Majority		61	1.4	+0.3
Turnout		4,472	66.7	–10.0
Registered electors		6,706		
Labour hold		Swing	▲0.1	

Wroxham
Party	Candidate	Votes	%	±%
Conservative	Shaun Murphy *	2,314	48.2	+1.0
Labour	Malcolm Kemp	1,416	29.5	–1.7
Liberal Democrats	Susan Matthew	829	17.3	–1.3
Green	Peter Reeve	243	5.1	+2.0
Majority		898	18.7	+2.7
Turnout		4,802	67.8	–7.3
Registered electors		7,082		
Conservative hold		Swing	▲1.4	

=== Great Yarmouth ===
Great Yarmouth District Summary
Party	Seats	+/-	Votes	%	+/-
Labour	7	▼1	19,641	49.2	–2.0
Conservative	3	▲1	16,167	40.5	+5.4
Liberal Democrats	0	Steady	2,578	6.5	–7.3
Green	0	Steady	1,555	3.9	N/A
Total	10	Steady	39,941	57.6	–11.7
Registered electors			69,363	–39	–0.1

Division results

Caister & Great Yarmouth North
Party	Candidate	Votes	%	±%
Labour	Patrick Hacon *	1,871	47.6	–3.2
Conservative	Susan Lawley	1,666	42.4	+5.5
Liberal Democrats	Nicholas Dyer	303	7.7	–4.6
Green	J. Todd	93	2.4	N/A
Majority		205	5.2	–8.8
Turnout		3,933	61.8	–8.8
Registered electors		6,367		
Labour hold		Swing	▼4.4	

East Flegg
Party	Candidate	Votes	%	±%
Conservative	Michael Carttiss	2,666	48.7	+5.3
Labour	Sandy Griffiths	2,085	38.1	–2.7
Liberal Democrats	Pamela Mayhew	587	10.7	–5.1
Green	A. Lee	135	2.5	N/A
Majority		581	10.6	+7.9
Turnout		5,473	61.9	–11.0
Registered electors		8,840		
Conservative hold		Swing	▲4.0	

Gorleston St Andrews
Party	Candidate	Votes	%	±%
Conservative	Bertie Collins*	1,522	45.5	+3.8
Labour	Sharon Thrasher	1,344	40.2	–3.5
Liberal Democrats	Ivan Lees	389	11.6	–3.0
Green	B. Horton	90	2.7	N/A
Majority		178	5.3	N/A
Turnout		3,345	60.4	–10.9
Registered electors		5,535		
Conservative gain from Labour		Swing	▲3.7	

Great Yarmouth Nelson
Party	Candidate	Votes	%	±%
Labour	John Holmes *	1,666	57.3	–2.2
Conservative	Gerald Jarvis	945	32.5	+3.6
Liberal Democrats	Michael Tall	232	8.0	–3.6
Green	A. Boud	62	2.1	N/A
Majority		721	24.8	–5.8
Turnout		2,905	45.1	–15.3
Registered electors		6,437		
Labour hold		Swing	▼2.9	

Lothingland East & Magdalen West
Party	Candidate	Votes	%	±%
Labour	Colleen Walker *	2,777	57.9	+0.9
Conservative	Graham Plant	1,748	36.5	+7.4
Green	C. Appia-Ayme	268	5.6	N/A
Majority		1,029	21.5	–6.5
Turnout		4,793	57.8	–12.8
Registered electors		8,292		
Labour hold		Swing	▼3.3	

Lothingland West
Party	Candidate	Votes	%	±%
Labour	Trevor Wainwright	2,795	49.5	–0.6
Conservative	A. Marter	2,482	44.0	+7.5
Green	J. Wiles	365	6.5	N/A
Majority		313	5.5	–8.1
Turnout		5,642	60.2	–10.7
Registered electors		9,366		
Labour hold		Swing	▼4.1	

Magdalen East & Claydon
Party	Candidate	Votes	%	±%
Labour	Anthony Blyth *	1,763	59.3	–3.6
Conservative	Patricia Page	876	29.5	+3.3
Liberal Democrats	Jocelyn Goodey	264	8.9	–2.0
Green	G. Fairhurst	68	2.3	N/A
Majority		887	29.9	–6.9
Turnout		2,971	54.9	–14.2
Registered electors		5,412		
Labour hold		Swing	▼3.5	

Northgate
Party	Candidate	Votes	%	±%
Labour	Michael Taylor *	1,342	57.4	+0.7
Conservative	Alan Baugh	776	33.2	+1.7
Liberal Democrats	Anthony Harris	173	7.4	–4.4
Green	V. Risebrow	49	2.1	N/A
Majority		566	24.2	–1.1
Turnout		2,340	52.9	–12.8
Registered electors		4,427		
Labour hold		Swing	▼0.5	

Southtown & Cobholm
Party	Candidate	Votes	%	±%
Labour	Michael Castle *	2,154	62.1	+4.1
Conservative	Jason Delf	1,060	30.6	+3.3
Green	M. Bunting	253	7.3	N/A
Majority		1,094	31.6	+1.0
Turnout		3,467	51.7	–14.3
Registered electors		6,748		
Labour hold		Swing	▲0.4	

West Flegg
Party	Candidate	Votes	%	±%
Conservative	James Shrimplin *	2,426	47.8	+4.8
Labour	R. Huxtable	1,844	36.4	–5.0
Liberal Democrats	Rodney Cole	630	12.4	–3.2
Green	W. Hazell	172	3.4	N/A
Majority		582	11.5	+9.8
Turnout		5,072	63.9	–8.0
Registered electors		7,939		
Conservative hold		Swing	▲4.9	

=== King's Lynn and West Norfolk ===
King's Lynn & West Norfolk District Summary
Party	Seats	+/-	Votes	%	+/-
Conservative	11	Steady	31,805	47.3	+6.0
Labour	4	Steady	20,366	30.3	–10.8
Liberal Democrats	0	Steady	10,608	15.8	–1.8
Green	0	Steady	2,406	3.6	N/A
Independent	0	Steady	2,020	3.0	N/A
Total	14	Steady	67,205	64.2	–8.3
Registered electors			104,637	+600	+0.6

Division results

Dersingham
Party	Candidate	Votes	%	±%
Conservative	Janice Eells *	2,351	39.4	+3.6
Liberal Democrats	Paul Burall	2,040	34.2	+1.7
Labour	M. Williams	1,452	24.3	–7.4
Green	E. Parker	122	2.0	N/A
Majority		311	5.2	+1.9
Turnout		5,965	71.3	–6.9
Registered electors		8,365		
Conservative hold		Swing	▲1.0	

Docking
Party	Candidate	Votes	%	±%
Conservative	Stephen Bett *	2,750	56.7	+7.8
Labour	James Mitchell	1,350	27.9	–6.6
Liberal Democrats	Colin Sayer	531	11.0	–5.6
Green	J. Fairbrass	216	4.5	N/A
Majority		1,400	28.9	+14.4
Turnout		4,847	65.0	–4.3
Registered electors		7,453		
Conservative hold		Swing	▲7.2	

Downham Market
Party	Candidate	Votes	%	±%
Conservative	David Forgan *	2,857	55.1	+7.1
Labour	Irene MacDonald	1,666	32.1	–6.4
Liberal Democrats	Kenneth Rooke	508	9.8	–3.7
Green	L. Wood	152	2.9	N/A
Majority		1,191	23.0	+13.5
Turnout		5,183	67.4	–6.8
Registered electors		7,689		
Conservative hold		Swing	▲6.8	

Feltwell
Party	Candidate	Votes	%	±%
Conservative	James Norris *	2,280	52.7	+13.3
Liberal Democrats	I. Mack	1,750	40.5	+8.3
Green	S. Bauguitte	294	6.8	N/A
Majority		530	12.3	+5.1
Turnout		4,324	62.0	–10.6
Registered electors		6,970		
Conservative hold		Swing	▲2.5	

Fincham
Party	Candidate	Votes	%	±%
Conservative	Richard Rockcliffe *	2,607	53.7	+5.7
Labour	Andrew Tyler	1,534	31.6	–6.1
Liberal Democrats	J. Rogers	559	11.5	–2.7
Green	P. Sinclair	155	3.2	N/A
Majority		1,073	22.1	+11.8
Turnout		4,855	67.1	–7.3
Registered electors		7,241		
Conservative hold		Swing	▲5.9	

Freebridge Lynn
Party	Candidate	Votes	%	±%
Conservative	David Rye *	3,225	50.6	+4.4
Labour	David Berry	1,901	29.9	–2.5
Liberal Democrats	David Parish	1,077	16.9	–4.5
Green	B. Luxton	165	2.6	N/A
Majority		1,324	20.8	+7.0
Turnout		6,368	71.8	–5.1
Registered electors		8,868		
Conservative hold		Swing	▲3.5	

Gaywood North & Central
Party	Candidate	Votes	%	±%
Labour	Antony Luckett*	2,602	46.0	–1.1
Conservative	Paul Foster	2,243	39.6	+4.9
Liberal Democrats	M. Walker	661	11.7	–6.5
Green	K. Amos	151	2.7	N/A
Majority		359	6.3	–6.1
Turnout		5,657	63.7	–8.4
Registered electors		8,882		
Labour hold		Swing	▼3.0	

Gaywood South
Party	Candidate	Votes	%	±%
Labour	Charles Joyce	1,537	58.6	–7.8
Conservative	Anthony White	768	29.3	+7.8
Liberal Democrats	John Loveless	265	10.1	–1.9
Green	E. Manning	54	2.1	N/A
Majority		769	29.3	–15.6
Turnout		2,624	54.2	–11.9
Registered electors		4,839		
Labour hold		Swing	▼7.8	

Hunstanton
Party	Candidate	Votes	%	±%
Conservative	Rosalie Monbiot	2,842	51.2	+2.9
Labour	C. Cook	1,741	31.3	–9.1
Liberal Democrats	Richard Mills	515	9.3	–1.9
Independent	N. Mitchison	321	5.8	N/A
Green	J. Godfrey	135	2.4	N/A
Majority		1,101	19.8	+11.9
Turnout		5,554	65.9	–6.0
Registered electors		8,425		
Conservative hold		Swing	▲6.0	

King's Lynn North & Central
Party	Candidate	Votes	%	±%
Labour	John Donaldson*	1,953	58.3	–9.1
Conservative	Lesley Bambridge	994	29.7	+6.7
Liberal Democrats	Nicole Farthing	286	8.5	–1.2
Green	M. Gibbs	116	3.5	N/A
Majority		959	28.6	–1.8
Turnout		3,349	56.9	–8.8
Registered electors		5,890		
Labour hold		Swing	▼7.9	

King's Lynn South
Party	Candidate	Votes	%	±%
Labour	William Davison *	1,652	51.2	–5.3
Conservative	H. Hazell	1,079	33.4	+6.5
Liberal Democrats	A. Rogers	359	11.1	–5.5
Green	A. Barker	138	4.3	N/A
Majority		573	17.8	–11.8
Turnout		3,228	60.9	–8.6
Registered electors		5,302		
Labour hold		Swing	▼5.9	

Marshland North
Party	Candidate	Votes	%	±%
Conservative	Anthony Wright *	2,652	47.8	+9.2
Labour	John Collop	1,796	32.4	–1.7
Liberal Democrats	Florence James	984	17.7	–9.6
Green	A. Snaith	119	2.1	N/A
Majority		856	15.4	+10.9
Turnout		5,551	64.5	–8.1
Registered electors		8,609		
Conservative hold		Swing	▲5.5	

Marshland South
Party	Candidate	Votes	%	±%
Conservative	Harry Humphrey*	2,598	54.6	+1.1
Independent	David Barnard	1,699	35.7	N/A
Green	P. Orpen	461	9.7	N/A
Majority		899	18.9	+12.0
Turnout		4,758	57.4	–12.4
Registered electors		8,291		
Conservative hold				

Winch
Party	Candidate	Votes	%	±%
Conservative	Heather Bolt *	2,559	51.8	+2.3
Labour	Lawrence Wilkinson	1,182	23.9	–12.0
Liberal Democrats	Judith Brown	1,073	21.7	+7.1
Green	A. Corble	128	2.6	N/A
Majority		1,377	27.9	+14.3
Turnout		4,942	63.3	–10.8
Registered electors		7,813		
Conservative hold		Swing	▲7.2	

=== North Norfolk ===
North Norfolk District Summary
Party	Seats	+/-	Votes	%	+/-
Conservative	8	▲6	22,525	40.7	+11.4
Liberal Democrats	1	▼2	18,271	33.0	+4.6
Labour	1	▼3	12,566	22.7	–5.1
Green	0	Steady	1,970	3.6	+0.5
Total	10	Steady	55,332	68.9	–5.0
Registered electors			80,278	–	+2.9

Division results

Cromer
Party	Candidate	Votes	%	±%
Conservative	Laurence Randall*	2,263	42.3	–0.7
Liberal Democrats	Richard Harbord	1,886	35.3	+2.3
Labour	Leslie Hawkes	1,023	19.1	–1.4
Green	CaroleLomax	177	3.3	–0.2
Majority		377	7.0	–3.0
Turnout		5,349	66.2	–5.8
Rejected ballots		46		
Registered electors		8,084		
Conservative hold		Swing	▼1.5	

Erpingham & Melton Constable
Party	Candidate	Votes	%	±%
Conservative	Russell Wright	1,880	37.5	+4.0
Labour	Aubrey Poberefsky*	1,748	34.9	–6.4
Liberal Democrats	Julian Gould	1,156	23.1	+0.3
Green	Peter Crouch	231	4.6	+2.2
Majority		132	2.6	N/A
Turnout		5,015	71.3	–4.5
Rejected ballots		52		
Registered electors		7,036		
Conservative gain from Labour		Swing	▲5.2	

Fakenham
Party	Candidate	Votes	%	±%
Conservative	Roy Banham	2,293	40.9	+16.2
Labour	David Callaby *	1,803	32.2	–4.6
Liberal Democrats	Edward Maxfield	1,371	24.5	N/A
Green	Eric Sabberton	137	2.4	–1.1
Majority		490	8.7	N/A
Turnout		5,604	65.9	–5.0
Rejected ballots		39		
Registered electors		8,498		
Conservative gain from Labour		Swing	▲10.4	

Holt
Party	Candidate	Votes	%	±%
Conservative	John Perry-Warnes	2,687	48.9	+10.2
Liberal Democrats	Antony Groom *	2,132	38.8	–1.0
Labour	Peter Kahn	534	9.7	–8.9
Green	Eileen Sabberton	141	2.6	–0.3
Majority		555	10.1	N/A
Turnout		5,494	73.4	–1.5
Rejected ballots		41		
Registered electors		7,488		
Conservative gain from Liberal Democrats		Swing	▲5.6	

Mundesley
Party	Candidate	Votes	%	±%
Conservative	Wyndham Northam	2,443	42.6	+8.8
Liberal Democrats	June Andersen	2,168	37.8	–1.9
Labour	David Spencer	880	15.3	–6.3
Green	Nancy Smith	245	4.3	–0.6
Majority		275	4.8	N/A
Turnout		5,736	69.0	–5.7
Rejected ballots		53		
Registered electors		8,319		
Conservative gain from Liberal Democrats		Swing	▲5.4	

North Smallburgh
Party	Candidate	Votes	%	±%
Labour	Sheila Cullingham *	1,891	34.5	–5.1
Conservative	George Barran	1,878	34.2	N/A
Liberal Democrats	Catherine Wilkins	1,483	27.0	–2.6
Green	Dean Hardingham	232	4.2	–0.1
Majority		13	0.2	–9.9
Turnout		5,484	67.2	–3.6
Rejected ballots		25		
Registered electors		8,162		
Labour hold		Swing		

North Walsham
Party	Candidate	Votes	%	±%
Conservative	Arthur Vincent	2,262	34.2	–1.5
Labour	Martin Booth *	2,140	32.4	–4.7
Liberal Democrats	Patrick Wilkins	2,018	30.5	+6.7
Green	Elsa Wyatt	192	2.9	–0.5
Majority		122	1.8	N/A
Turnout		6,612	66.6	–6.6
Rejected ballots		67		
Registered electors		9,934		
Conservative gain from Labour		Swing	▲1.6	

Sheringham
Party	Candidate	Votes	%	±%
Liberal Democrats	Brian Hannah	2,907	48.0	+3.1
Conservative	Lionel McGinn	2,345	38.7	+2.9
Labour	Philip Crump	622	10.3	–5.9
Green	Allen O'Keefe	182	3.0	±0.0
Majority		562	9.3	+0.2
Turnout		6,056	70.6	–4.6
Rejected ballots		73		
Registered electors		8,575		
Liberal Democrats hold		Swing	▲0.1	

South Smallburgh
Party	Candidate	Votes	%	±%
Conservative	Leslie Mogford *	2,486	47.5	+4.1
Liberal Democrats	Simon Partridge	1,605	30.6	+11.9
Labour	David Russell	912	17.4	–5.0
Green	Sarah Crouch	234	4.5	+2.1
Majority		881	16.8	–4.3
Turnout		5,237	70.0	–6.0
Rejected ballots		59		
Registered electors		7,484		
Conservative hold		Swing	▼3.9	

Wells
Party	Candidate	Votes	%	±%
Conservative	Derek Baxter	1,988	41.9	N/A
Liberal Democrats	Susan Pointer	1,545	32.6	+4.2
Labour	Kevin Craske	1,013	21.3	–2.1
Green	Emma Appleton	199	4.2	N/A
Majority		443	9.3	N/A
Turnout		4,745	70.8	–5.7
Rejected ballots		45		
Registered electors		6,698		
Conservative gain from Independent		Swing		

=== Norwich ===
Norwich District Summary
Party	Seats	+/-	Votes	%	+/-
Labour	11	▼2	22,464	41.7	–8.2
Liberal Democrats	5	▲2	16,881	31.4	+3.8
Conservative	0	Steady	10,875	20.2	–0.6
Green	0	Steady	3,591	6.7	+5.0
Total	16	Steady	53,811	56.5	–15.6
Registered electors			95,323	–	+1.5

Division results

Bowthorpe
Party	Candidate	Votes	%	±%
Labour	Gail Loveday	2,126	50.6	–5.7
Liberal Democrats	E. Wilson	935	22.3	+1.4
Conservative	P. Scaife	918	21.9	+2.1
Green	Beth Brockett	221	5.3	+2.3
Majority		1,191	28.4	–7.0
Turnout		4,200	49.0	–15.9
Registered electors		8,573		
Labour hold		Swing	▼3.6	

Catton Grove
Party	Candidate	Votes	%	±%
Labour	Brian Morrey *	1,329	48.3	–8.5
Conservative	Peter Kearney	762	27.7	+2.9
Liberal Democrats	I. Kendrick	530	19.2	+0.7
Green	L. Clements	133	4.8	N/A
Majority		567	20.6	–11.4
Turnout		2,754	50.3	–16.9
Registered electors		5,476		
Labour hold		Swing	▼5.7	

Coslany
Party	Candidate	Votes	%	±%
Labour	Catherine Ward *	1,597	47.8	–7.2
Conservative	Ernest Horth	781	23.4	–0.5
Liberal Democrats	Alisdair Gordon	699	20.9	–0.2
Green	Adrian Holmes	265	7.9	N/A
Majority		816	24.4	–6.6
Turnout		3,342	56.2	–16.2
Registered electors		5,942		
Labour hold		Swing	▼3.9	

Crome
Party	Candidate	Votes	%	±%
Labour	Joan Fowler *	1,699	53.5	–11.3
Conservative	Colin Barker	938	29.6	+8.6
Liberal Democrats	Martin Verran	474	14.9	+0.8
Green	L. Ledoux	62	2.0	N/A
Majority		761	24.0	–19.8
Turnout		3,173	59.5	–35.3
Registered electors		5,332		
Labour hold		Swing	▼10.0	

Eaton
Party	Candidate	Votes	%	±%
Liberal Democrats	Mervyn Scutter	2,303	47.8	+6.6
Conservative	Bernard Wells	1,621	33.6	–2.5
Labour	Carol Morrey	767	15.9	–6.7
Green	L. Mathieu	127	2.6	N/A
Majority		682	14.2	+9.1
Turnout		4,818	75.2	–6.0
Registered electors		6,409		
Liberal Democrats hold		Swing	▲4.6	

Heigham
Party	Candidate	Votes	%	±%
Labour	John Sheppard *	1,449	44.4	–10.8
Liberal Democrats	Phillip Bazley	1,174	36.0	+8.4
Conservative	R. Allison	466	14.3	–2.9
Green	I. Harris	175	5.4	N/A
Majority		275	8.4	–19.2
Turnout		3,264	58.1	–10.7
Registered electors		5,618		
Labour hold		Swing	▼9.6	

Henderson
Party	Candidate	Votes	%	±%
Labour	Harriet Panting *	1,367	44.1	–12.0
Green	Steven Land	727	23.5	+18.1
Liberal Democrats	Anne Stairs	586	18.9	–2.7
Conservative	Richard Wells	418	13.5	–3.4
Majority		640	20.7	–13.8
Turnout		3,098	55.0	–11.8
Registered electors		5,632		
Labour hold		Swing	▼15.1	

Lakenham
Party	Candidate	Votes	%	±%
Labour	Susan Whitaker	1,486	46.9	–5.4
Liberal Democrats	Colin Harper *	1,019	32.1	+3.6
Conservative	S. Daryanani	511	16.1	–3.1
Green	A. Wakeman	154	4.9	N/A
Majority		467	14.7	–9.0
Turnout		3,170	56.8	–12.8
Registered electors		5,583		
Labour hold		Swing	▼4.5	

Mancroft
Party	Candidate	Votes	%	±%
Labour	Mary McKay	1,455	39.5	–8.7
Liberal Democrats	N. Ali	1,137	30.8	+8.7
Conservative	Ian Mackie	777	21.1	–2.6
Green	Richard House	317	8.6	+2.7
Majority		318	8.6	–15.9
Turnout		3,686	53.2	–11.9
Registered electors		6,931		
Labour hold		Swing	▼4.4	

Mile Cross
Party	Candidate	Votes	%	±%
Labour	Andrew Panes *	1,667	64.5	–3.5
Conservative	R. Nash	460	17.8	+2.4
Liberal Democrats	Ian Williams	378	14.6	–2.0
Green	C. Saunders	80	3.1	N/A
Majority		1,207	46.7	–4.7
Turnout		2,585	47.7	–20.5
Registered electors		5,423		
Labour hold		Swing	▼3.0	

Mousehold
Party	Candidate	Votes	%	±%
Labour	Peter Buttle *	1,405	44.2	–13.1
Liberal Democrats	Paul Kendrick	1,057	33.2	+15.3
Conservative	John Fisher	529	16.6	–4.0
Green	Rupert Read	188	5.9	+1.8
Majority		348	11.0	–25.7
Turnout		3,179	52.2	–18.7
Registered electors		6,086		
Labour hold		Swing	▼14.2	

Nelson
Party	Candidate	Votes	%	±%
Liberal Democrats	P. Jimenez	1,405	39.9	+5.1
Labour	John Garrett *	1,349	38.3	–7.1
Conservative	Victor Hopes	415	11.8	–2.3
Green	D. Williams	355	10.1	+4.4
Majority		56	1.6	N/A
Turnout		3,524	62.8	–13.3
Registered electors		5,615		
Liberal Democrats gain from Labour		Swing	▲6.1	

St Stephen
Party	Candidate	Votes	%	±%
Labour	Celia Cameron *	1,478	42.7	–4.3
Liberal Democrats	Esther Harris	977	28.2	+3.7
Conservative	Trevor Ivory	784	22.7	–5.9
Green	Neville Bartlett	221	6.4	N/A
Majority		501	14.5	–3.9
Turnout		3,460	61.6	–12.3
Registered electors		5,618		
Labour hold		Swing	▼4.0	

Thorpe Hamlet
Party	Candidate	Votes	%	±%
Liberal Democrats	Barbara Hacker *	1,458	44.9	+1.5
Labour	Philip Harris	1,120	34.5	–7.1
Conservative	Michael Utting	488	15.0	–0.1
Green	Ingo Wagenknecht	182	5.6	N/A
Majority		338	10.4	+8.6
Turnout		3,248	52.7	–16.8
Registered electors		6,124		
Liberal Democrats hold		Swing	▲4.3	

Town Close
Party	Candidate	Votes	%	±%
Liberal Democrats	T. Stickle	1,355	41.8	–6.8
Labour	Kenneth Brown	1,092	33.7	–1.5
Conservative	Anthony Little	626	19.3	+3.1
Green	Margaret Charnley	168	5.2	N/A
Majority		263	8.1	–5.2
Turnout		3,241	59.5	–15.2
Registered electors		5,446		
Liberal Democrats hold		Swing	▼2.7	

University
Party	Candidate	Votes	%	±%
Liberal Democrats	Jane Rooza	1,394	45.4	+5.5
Labour	Roy Blower *	1,078	35.1	–6.9
Conservative	G. Nicholson	381	12.4	–2.4
Green	R. Tinch	216	7.0	+3.7
Majority		316	10.3	N/A
Turnout		3,069	55.7	–16.5
Registered electors		5,515		
Liberal Democrats gain from Labour		Swing	▲6.2	

=== South Norfolk ===
South Norfolk District Summary
Party	Seats	+/-	Votes	%	+/-
Conservative	8	▲3	25,299	42.6	+5.1
Liberal Democrats	3	▼3	21,209	35.7	–5.9
Labour	0	Steady	10,901	18.4	–1.8
Green	0	Steady	1,986	3.3	+2.5
Total	11	Steady	59,395	67.2	–9.7
Registered electors			88,386	–	+3.0

Division results

Clavering
Party	Candidate	Votes	%	±%
Conservative	Anthony Tomkinson	1,941	37.7	+7.6
Liberal Democrats	P. Mitchell	1,914	37.2	–10.3
Labour	Stephen Pank	1,067	20.7	–1.6
Green	S. Croft	221	4.3	N/A
Majority		27	0.5	N/A
Turnout		5,143	68.9	–8.9
Registered electors		7,464		
Conservative gain from Liberal Democrats		Swing	▲9.0	

Costessey
Party	Candidate	Votes	%	±%
Liberal Democrats	Tim East *	2,474	52.6	+4.3
Conservative	J. Brown	1,438	30.6	+1.1
Labour	J. Westmacott-Verran	670	14.3	–7.9
Green	Jennifer Parkhouse	119	2.5	N/A
Majority		1,036	22.0	+3.2
Turnout		4,701	61.7	–11.2
Registered electors		7,947		
Liberal Democrats hold		Swing	▲1.6	

Diss
Party	Candidate	Votes	%	±%
Liberal Democrats	Jill Caldwell *	2,471	43.5	–9.0
Conservative	Beverley Spratt	1,998	35.2	+4.9
Labour	Robin Vrynw-Pierce	1,037	18.2	+1.0
Green	Graham Sessions	177	3.1	N/A
Majority		473	8.3	–13.9
Turnout		5,683	62.9	–8.9
Registered electors		9,034		
Liberal Democrats hold		Swing	▼7.0	

East Depwade
Party	Candidate	Votes	%	±%
Conservative	Ronald Johnson *	2,448	43.8	+4.3
Liberal Democrats	P. Allen	1,909	34.2	–3.6
Labour	J. Sauverin	1,037	18.6	–4.1
Green	C. Mace	190	3.4	N/A
Majority		539	9.7	+8.0
Turnout		5,584	65.8	–10.2
Registered electors		8,482		
Conservative hold		Swing	▲4.0	

Henstead
Party	Candidate	Votes	%	±%
Conservative	Graham Hemming *	2,104	41.6	+2.8
Liberal Democrats	Alistair Miller	1,622	32.1	–3.6
Labour	Janet King	1,127	22.3	+0.8
Green	S. Cornell	204	4.0	±0.0
Majority		482	9.5	+6.4
Turnout		5,057	70.3	–8.9
Registered electors		7,194		
Conservative hold		Swing	▲3.2	

Hingham
Party	Candidate	Votes	%	±%
Conservative	Steven Dorrington	1,953	40.9	+5.3
Liberal Democrats	Jeremy Dore *	1,755	36.7	–8.7
Labour	B. Lambert	824	17.2	–1.8
Green	P. Eldridge	248	5.2	N/A
Majority		198	4.1	N/A
Turnout		4,780	68.9	–9.2
Registered electors		6,942		
Conservative gain from Liberal Democrats		Swing	▲7.0	

Humbleyard
Party	Candidate	Votes	%	±%
Conservative	Alison King *	2,578	48.7	+4.7
Liberal Democrats	Jaqueline Sutton	1,715	32.4	–7.8
Labour	M. Graham	864	16.3	+2.2
Green	Roy Walmsley	136	2.6	+0.9
Majority		863	16.3	+12.6
Turnout		5,293	71.0	–8.4
Registered electors		7,460		
Conservative hold		Swing	▲6.3	

Loddon
Party	Candidate	Votes	%	±%
Conservative	Adrian Gunson *	3,705	68.8	+6.8
Liberal Democrats	U. Bentley	765	14.2	–2.5
Labour	Jonathan Skilleter	763	14.2	–4.2
Green	E. Szewczuk	156	2.9	±0.0
Majority		2,940	54.6	+11.0
Turnout		5,389	70.8	–8.4
Registered electors		7,607		
Conservative hold		Swing	▲4.7	

Long Stratton
Party	Candidate	Votes	%	±%
Liberal Democrats	Edward Littler *	2,245	43.6	–8.7
Conservative	James Tumbridge	1,806	35.1	+5.7
Labour	Sally Blaikie	947	18.4	+0.1
Green	T. Wakeman	153	3.0	N/A
Majority		439	8.5	–14.4
Turnout		5,151	64.6	–13.5
Registered electors		7,974		
Liberal Democrats hold		Swing	▼7.2	

West Depwade
Party	Candidate	Votes	%	±%
Conservative	Neville Chapman *	2,657	44.8	+2.0
Liberal Democrats	Bodo Rissmann	1,917	32.3	–7.8
Labour	M. Vyrnmy-Pierce	1,134	19.1	+2.0
Green	Mercy Harmer	225	3.8	N/A
Majority		740	12.5	+9.8
Turnout		5,933	70.6	–7.7
Registered electors		8,400		
Conservative hold		Swing	▲4.9	

Wymondham
Party	Candidate	Votes	%	±%
Conservative	Martin Wynne	2,671	40.0	+9.1
Liberal Democrats	Diana Hockaday *	2,422	36.3	–4.7
Labour	S. Jones	1,431	21.4	–6.7
Green	Robert Cook	157	2.3	N/A
Majority		249	3.7	N/A
Turnout		6,681	67.6	–8.1
Registered electors		9,882		
Conservative gain from Liberal Democrats		Swing	▲6.9	
