= Michael Carttiss =

British politician

Member of Parliament for Great Yarmouth
- In office 9 June 1983 – 1 May 1997
- Preceded by: Anthony Fell
- Succeeded by: Tony Wright

Norfolk County Councillor for West Flegg
- In office 7 June 2001 – 4 May 2017
- Preceded by: James Shrimplin
- Succeeded by: Haydn Thirtle
- In office May 1966 – 2 May 1985
- Succeeded by: R Tingey

Personal details
- Born: 11 March 1938 (age 88)
- Party: Conservative
- Education: Goldsmiths College, London University, & London School of Economics
- Occupation: Teacher

Michael Reginald Harry Carttiss (born 11 March 1938) is a former British Conservative Party politician. He was Member of Parliament (MP) for Great Yarmouth from 1983 to 1997.

== Early life ==
Carttiss was born on 11 March 1938. He received his formal education at Filby Primary School near Great Yarmouth and Great Yarmouth Technical High School, followed by Goldsmiths College, London University, and the London School of Economics.

From 1961 to 1969 he was employed as a school teacher, beginning at the Ramsden School for Boys in Orpington, Kent.

== Political and civic career ==
Carttiss joined the Conservative Party in the early 1960s, and was elected to Norfolk County Council as a Conservative councillor for the West Flegg division in 1966, at the age of 28. He served as a county councillor from 1966 to 1985. In 1972 he held the post of Vice-Chair of the County Council's Education Committee, and was that committee's Chair from 1980 to 1985.

Between 1969 and 1982 Carttiss was employed as a professional election agent for the Conservative Party in the Yarmouth area.

From 1981 to 1985 he was the Chair of the Norfolk Museum Service, and served on the East Anglia Regional Health Authority; and from 1981 to 1985 he served on the Great Yarmouth Port & Haven Commission.

From 1973 to 1982 he was also a councillor on Great Yarmouth Borough Council, and served as the political leader of that council from 1980 to 1982.

In 1982 the sitting Conservative Member of Parliament, Anthony Fell, retired and Carttiss was selected by the Great Yarmouth Conservative Association at the age of 44 to contest the seat in the 1983 general election, where he won with a 5,309 vote majority, receiving 50.5% of the overall votes cast.

In the House of Commons Carttiss aligned himself with the radical right of the Conservative Party, and was a backbench supporter of Margaret Thatcher through the 1980s at a time of upheaval in British politics.

In the 1987 general election he was returned as Great Yarmouth's Member of Parliament with a 10,083 vote majority (51.7% of the votes cast), making the constituency an apparently "safe" Conservative Party seat in the Commons.

During a debate in the House of Commons' Chamber on 22 November 1990, a few hours after Margaret Thatcher had announced her resignation as Prime Minister in acrimonious circumstances, Carttiss' loud shout of encouragement to her as she verbally attacked the opposition Labour Party, with "Cancel the resignation, cancel the resignation, you can wipe the floor with these people!", was clearly audible, and was recorded in Hansard. Immediately after the remark, Margaret Thatcher acknowledged his support by looking back at him and bowing.

In the 1992 general election Carttiss was returned as the sitting MP in Great Yarmouth with a 5,309 majority (47.9% of the overall votes cast).

=== Maastricht Treaty rebel ===
With the replacement of Margaret Thatcher as Prime Minister with John Major, a moderate Tory, Carttiss found himself in conflict with the parliamentary leadership of his party. He was a convinced Eurosceptic and opposed the passage into law through the House of Commons of the Maastricht Treaty, which transformed the European Economic Community into the European Union, and voted against it and his own party's government repeatedly in the Commons' division lobby in early 1993. When he voted against the 'European Communities (Finance) Bill', a part of the Treaty being rendered into United Kingdom statute in November 1994, Carttiss was one of eight Conservative MPs, dubbed the Maastricht Rebels, to have the Conservative Parliamentary whip withdrawn. On the calling of a confidence motion in John Major's Government in the same month, with the European Communities (Finance) Bill attached to it, rather than bring the Conservative Government down, Carttiss voted to support the Government and the passage of the E.C. (Finance) Bill, with all but one of the other Maastricht Rebels doing the same, signaling the end of their stand and acquiescence to the Government's will in the matter. The Conservative Party offered the whip to Carttiss again in April 1995, which he accepted.

In the 1997 general election Carttiss was defeated in Great Yarmouth by the Labour Party candidate Tony Wright, with a collapse in the Conservative Party's vote nationally being reflected in a 12% fall in Great Yarmouth, giving the Labour Party more than an 8,000 majority, in what had been in 1987 considered as a safe Conservative parliamentary seat.

== Post-parliamentary political career ==
Following his defeat Carttiss went back on to Norfolk County Council, being re-elected to represent its 'West Flegg Division' in 2001, and was made Vice-Chairman of the Council in 2006 and its Chairman the following year. He represented the 'West Flegg Division' until 2017, when he stepped down in his 80th year after 50 years in electoral politics, not contesting that year's County Council Election.

Parliament of the United Kingdom
Preceded by Sir Anthony Fell	Member of Parliament for Great Yarmouth; 1983 – 1997	Succeeded by Anthony Wright
