= 2026 Norfolk County Council election =

2026 English local government election

- 7 May 2026

All 84 seats to Norfolk County Council 43 seats needed for a majority
- Registered: 715,914
- Turnout: 325,335; 45.4%
	First party	Second party	Third party
Leader	Julian Kirk	Brian Watkins	Catherine Rowett
Party	Reform	Liberal Democrats	Green
Leader's seat	Marshland North	Eaton	West Depwade (Retiring)
Last election	0 seats, 0.1%	8 seats, 14.9%	3 seats, 10.2%
Seats before	2	10	4
Seats won	40	13	12
Seat change	▲38	▲3	▲8
Popular vote	101,536	47,694	53,918
Percentage	31.2%	14.7%	16.6%
Swing	▲31.1%	▼0.2%	▲6.4%
	Fourth party	Fifth party	Sixth party
Leader	Jonathan Wedon	Kay Mason Billig	Steve Morphew
Party	Great Yarmouth First	Conservative	Labour
Leader's seat	Lothingland	Loddon	Catton Grove (Retiring)
Last election	Did not exist	58 seats, 48.4%	12 seats, 22.1%
Seats before	0	52 (Note: Includes the vacant seats in Diss & Roydon and Yare & All Saints last held by the Conservatives.)	11 (Note: Includes the vacant seats in Town Close and Wensum last held by Labour.)
Seats won	9	8	1
Seat change	▲9	▼44	▼10
Popular vote	15,610	64,270	33,426
Percentage	4.8%	19.8%	10.3%
Swing	N/A	▼28.6%	▼11.8%
	Seventh party
Leader	(Note: Maxine Webb was the leader of the Independent Progressive group and Simon Ring was the leader of the Independent group.)
Party	Independent
Last election	3 seats, 4.1%
Seats before	5 (Note: Includes the vacant seat in Freebridge Lynn last held by an independent.) (Note: Of the 5 Independent councillors before the election, 3 sat in the Independent group and 2 sat in the Independent Progressive group.)
Seats won	1
Seat change	▼4
Popular vote	8,654
Percentage	2.7%
Swing	▼1.4%
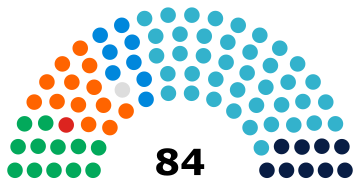
- Results by division Map of seats
Leader before election
Kay Mason Billig
Conservative
Leader after election
David Bick
Reform
No overall control (Note: Reform minority.)

The 2026 Norfolk County Council election took place on 7 May 2026 to elect members to Norfolk County Council in Norfolk, England. All 84 seats were elected. This was on the same day as other 2026 local elections.

Prior to the election, the council was under Conservative majority control. At the election, the council went under no overall control. Reform UK were the largest party after the election with 40 seats, leaving them three seats short of a majority. Reform then chose David Bick to be their new group leader; he was formally appointed as leader of the council at the subsequent annual council meeting on 28 May 2026, leading a minority administration.

== Background ==
At the 2021 election, the Conservatives won a majority of seats. The 2026 election was held under new electoral division boundaries. Having delayed the elections from 2025 to 2026, the government announced plans to further delay them until 2027, but abandoned this following a legal challenge by Reform UK.

According to a BBC report in March 2026 citing Conservative sources, the party's own internal polling was showing it facing the loss of most of its seats.

== Summary ==
The Conservatives lost 44 of the 52 seats they were defending, 38 of them to the Reform (UK) Party.

Reform won the most seats at 40, doing particullarly well in South Norfolk, a former Tory stronghold. This left them just three seats shy of a majority in the county council, partly due to the success of Great Yarmouth First (connected with Restore Britain) and the Liberal Democrats. In North Norfolk there were ten council seats up for election, with the Liberal Democrats winning seven of them, while Great Yarmouth First won all nine seats in the Borough of Great Yarmouth.

The Green Party won 10 of the 13 seats in Norwich. They also won one seat in each of Broadland and South Norfolk districts.

Labour won just one seat, in the Hethersett division of South Norfolk.

== Results ==
2026 Norfolk County Council election
Party	Candidates	Seats	Gains	Losses	Net gain/loss	Seats %	Votes %	Votes	+/−
Reform	84	40	N/A	N/A	▲38	47.6	31.2	101,536	+31.1
Liberal Democrats	80	13	N/A	N/A	▲3	15.5	14.7	47,694	–0.2
Green	79	12	N/A	N/A	▲8	14.3	16.6	53,918	+6.4
Great Yarmouth First	9	9	N/A	N/A	▲9	10.7	4.8	15,610	N/A
Conservative	84	8	N/A	N/A	▼44	9.5	19.8	64,270	–28.6
Labour	84	1	N/A	N/A	▼10	1.2	10.3	33,426	–11.8
Independent	15	1	N/A	N/A	▼4	1.2	2.7	8,654	–1.4
Monster Raving Loony	1	0	N/A	N/A	Steady	0.0	<0.1	79	±0.0
Heritage	1	0	N/A	N/A	Steady	0.0	<0.1	77	N/A
Communist	2	0	N/A	N/A	Steady	0.0	<0.1	76	N/A

== Candidates by local authority ==
=== Breckland ===
==== District summary ====
Breckland district summary
Party	Seats	+/-	Votes	%	+/-
Reform	11	▲10	19,363	42.0	N/A
Conservative	1	▼10	12,328	26.8	–34.8
Green	0	Steady	5,589	12.1	+5.5
Labour	0	Steady	4,818	10.5	–12.5
Liberal Democrats	0	Steady	3,779	8.2	±0.0
Independent	0	Steady	186	0.4	+0.1
Total	12	Steady	46,239	41.5	+12.3
Registered electors			111,433	–	+3.2

==== Division results ====
Attleborough
Party	Candidate	Votes	%	±%
Reform	Daniel Burcham	1,433	49.0	N/A
Green	Jayne Booth	547	18.7	N/A
Conservative	Taila Taylor	542	18.5	−42.5
Labour	Marcia Solloway-Brown	404	13.8	−7.6
Majority		886	30.3	N/A
Turnout		2,956	37.9	+11.5
Registered electors		7,807		
Reform gain from Conservative				

Dereham North & Scarning
Party	Candidate	Votes	%
Conservative	Alison Webb	1,205	37.2
Reform	Andrew Keats	1,106	34.2
Green	Aidan Webster	384	11.9
Labour	Linda Goreham	323	10.0
Liberal Democrats	Charlotte Foley	219	6.8
Majority		99	3.0
Turnout		3,245	40.1
Registered electors		8,090	
Conservative win (new seat)			

Dereham South
Party	Candidate	Votes	%	±%
Reform	Robin Hunter-Clarke	1,393	42.1	N/A
Conservative	Phillip Duigan*	707	21.4	−29.6
Labour Co-op	Harry Clarke	514	15.6	−26.8
Green	Benjamin Gibbons	505	15.3	N/A
Liberal Democrats	Karn Purvis	186	5.6	−1.0
Majority		686	20.7	N/A
Turnout		3,312	35.9	+10.3
Registered electors		9,236		
Reform gain from Conservative				

Elmham & Mattishall
Party	Candidate	Votes	%	±%
Reform	Paul Carr	1,418	35.1	N/A
Conservative	William Borrett*	1,365	33.8	−30.4
Liberal Democrats	Mark Foley	516	12.8	+2.3
Green	Matthew Carding-Woods	479	11.8	−1.1
Labour	Kendra Cogman	265	6.6	−5.8
Majority		53	1.3	N/A
Turnout		4,057	47.3	+13.4
Registered electors		8,581		
Reform gain from Conservative				

Guiltcross
Party	Candidate	Votes	%	±%
Reform	Jacob Allen	1,797	35.9	N/A
Conservative	John Nunn	1,439	28.7	−37.8
Green	Rachael Carding-Woods	734	14.6	N/A
Liberal Democrats	Nathan Flatman	552	11.0	−2.4
Labour	Terry Land	489	9.8	−10.3
Majority		358	7.2	N/A
Turnout		5,029	45.2	+11.5
Registered electors		11,131		
Reform gain from Conservative				

Launditch
Party	Candidate	Votes	%
Reform	Tom Dickerson	1,798	39.6
Conservative	Mark Kiddle-Morris*	1,158	25.5
Liberal Democrats	Matthew Weatherill	782	17.2
Green	Alison Keidan-Cooper	500	11.0
Labour	Howard Hawkes	297	6.5
Majority		640	14.1
Turnout		4,556	50.0
Registered electors		9,108	
Reform win (new seat)			

Swaffham
Party	Candidate	Votes	%	±%
Reform	Jaden Lister	1,869	46.0	N/A
Conservative	Wendy Bensley	1,020	25.1	−43.5
Green	Sally Jones	509	12.5	+3.4
Labour	Douglas Jefferson	361	8.9	−7.7
Liberal Democrats	Victor Scrivens	304	7.5	+1.8
Majority		849	20.9	N/A
Turnout		4,080	41.4	+11.9
Registered electors		9,855		
Reform gain from Conservative				

The Brecks
Party	Candidate	Votes	%	±%
Reform	Scott Hussey	2,183	44.6	N/A
Conservative	Fabian Eagle*	1,577	32.2	−37.2
Green	Timothy Soar	499	10.2	+0.9
Labour	David Blackbourn	371	7.6	−8.2
Liberal Democrats	Richard McKenny	263	5.4	±0.0
Majority		606	12.4	N/A
Turnout		4,903	48.3	+15.5
Registered electors		10,160		
Reform gain from Conservative				

Thetford East
Party	Candidate	Votes	%	±%
Reform	Denise Hilton	1,385	42.8	N/A
Conservative	Jane James*	766	23.7	−28.0
Labour	Elizabeth Bernard	594	18.4	−18.2
Green	Matthew Bray	346	10.7	N/A
Liberal Democrats	Carol Renard	142	4.4	−1.7
Majority		619	19.1	N/A
Turnout		3,244	35.0	+10.8
Registered electors		9,283		
Reform gain from Conservative				

Thetford West
Party	Candidate	Votes	%	±%
Reform	David Bick*	1,110	47.9	N/A
Labour	Victor Peters	480	20.7	−36.2
Green	Jamie Walker	236	10.2	N/A
Conservative	Paula Wood	235	10.1	−23.9
Independent	Carla Barreto	186	8.0	N/A
Liberal Democrats	Julie Dew	70	3.0	−1.8
Majority		630	27.2	N/A
Turnout		2,324	27.4	+5.2
Registered electors		8,487		
Reform hold				

Watton
Party	Candidate	Votes	%	±%
Reform	Jack White	1,766	46.8	N/A
Conservative	Claire Bowes*	1,090	28.9	−37.3
Green	Ann Bowyer	470	12.5	−2.4
Labour	Robin Goreham	232	6.2	−6.6
Liberal Democrats	Sheila Hodgkinson	213	5.6	−0.4
Majority		676	17.9	N/A
Turnout		3,788	38.0	+12.0
Registered electors		9,975		
Reform gain from Conservative				

Yare & Necton
Party	Candidate	Votes	%	±%
Reform	Kabeer Kher	2,105	44.5	N/A
Conservative	Marshall Bunting	1,224	25.9	−41.6
Green	Marie Brennan	584	12.4	+0.3
Labour	Jose Sisto	488	10.3	−4.2
Liberal Democrats	Ulrike Behrendt	328	6.9	+1.0
Majority		881	18.6	N/A
Turnout		4,745	48.8	+17.1
Registered electors		9,720		
Reform gain from Conservative				

=== Broadland ===
==== District summary ====
Broadland district summary
Party	Seats	+/-	Votes	%	+/-
Reform	7	▲7	16,993	32.7	N/A
Liberal Democrats	3	▲1	9,179	17.4	–2.3
Conservative	2	▼9	12,776	24.2	–28.4
Green	1	▲1	9,014	17.1	+7.7
Labour	0	Steady	4,677	8.9	–9.2
Independent	0	Steady	169	0.3	+0.1
Total	13	Steady	52,808	48.7	
Registered electors			108,442	–	

==== Division results ====
Acle
Party	Candidate	Votes	%	±%
Reform	Justine Thomas	1,625	38.9	N/A
Green	Jess Royal	1,193	28.6	+16.4
Conservative	Lana Hempsall	668	16.0	−38.7
Labour	John Chapman	307	7.3	−13.7
Liberal Democrats	Victor Morgan	215	5.1	−7.0
Independent	Grant Nurden	169	4.0	N/A
Majority		432	10.3	N/A
Turnout		4,204	50.3	+15.3
Registered electors		8,373		
Reform gain from Conservative				

Aylsham
Party	Candidate	Votes	%	±%
Liberal Democrats	Sue Catchpole	1,935	45.0	+2.3
Reform	Paul Freeman	1,213	28.2	N/A
Conservative	Peter Darling	628	14.6	−27.5
Green	Thomas Williamson	338	7.9	+1.0
Labour	Kay Montandon	186	4.3	−1.7
Majority		722	16.8	+16.2
Turnout		4,300	50.3	
Registered electors		8,566		
Liberal Democrats hold				

Blofield & Brundall
Party	Candidate	Votes	%	±%
Green	Jan Davis	1,780	36.1	+20.3
Reform	Peter Freeman	1,449	29.4	N/A
Conservative	David Disney	1,097	22.3	−36.5
Liberal Democrats	Eleanor Mason	304	6.2	−0.8
Labour	Emma Covington	297	6.0	−12.4
Majority		331	6.7	N/A
Turnout		4,927	53.2	
Registered electors		9,310		
Green gain from Conservative				

Coltishall & Spixworth
Party	Candidate	Votes	%
Liberal Democrats	Dan Roper*	1,805	44.4
Reform	Jason Squire	1,288	31.7
Conservative	Martin Murrell	561	13.8
Green	Phoebe Connell	288	7.1
Labour	Jack Chapman	121	3.0
Majority		517	12.7
Turnout		4,063	49.9
Registered electors		8,178	
Liberal Democrats win (new seat)			

Drayton & Horsford
Party	Candidate	Votes	%	±%
Reform	Jason Butler	1,512	36.5	N/A
Liberal Democrats	Lisa Starling	1,076	26.0	−14.5
Conservative	Simon Woodbridge	801	19.3	−29.0
Green	Richard Wink	475	11.5	N/A
Labour	Hlenn Springett-Lees	276	6.7	−4.6
Majority		436	10.5	N/A
Turnout		4,140	45.5	
Registered electors		9,110		
Reform gain from Conservative				

Hellesdon
Party	Candidate	Votes	%	±%
Reform	Nick Taylor	1,442	34.8	N/A
Conservative	Shelagh Gurney*	1,360	32.8	−26.5
Green	Lee Marsden	564	13.6	+8.2
Labour	Andrew Lock	426	10.3	−11.4
Liberal Democrats	David Britcher	356	8.6	−5.0
Majority		82	2.0	N/A
Turnout		4,148	45.3	
Registered electors		9,181		
Reform gain from Conservative				

Old Catton
Party	Candidate	Votes	%	±%
Reform	Mark Tucker	1,006	30.0	N/A
Conservative	Antony Little	875	26.1	−33.6
Green	Ian Chapman	628	18.8	+9.3
Labour	Bill Couzens	531	15.9	−8.5
Liberal Democrats	Martin Callam	308	9.2	+2.8
Majority		131	3.9	N/A
Turnout		3,348	47.7	
Registered electors		7,047		
Reform gain from Conservative				

Reepham
Party	Candidate	Votes	%	±%
Liberal Democrats	David Thomas	1,344	32.4	+0.7
Reform	Geraldine Gray	1,317	31.7	N/A
Conservative	Peter Bulman	900	21.7	−27.6
Green	Sarah Morgan	402	9.7	−1.3
Labour	Jo Emmerson	191	4.6	−3.3
Majority		27	0.7	N/A
Turnout		4,154	49.8	
Registered electors		8,364		
Liberal Democrats gain from Conservative				

Sprowston
Party	Candidate	Votes	%	±%
Reform	Stephen Bailey	1,623	37.6	N/A
Conservative	John Ward*	917	21.2	−32.7
Labour	Bibin Baby	755	17.5	−17.8
Green	Ailsa Marcham	746	17.3	+10.8
Liberal Democrats	Derek Wood	280	6.5	+2.2
Majority		706	16.4	N/A
Turnout		4,321	48.0	
Registered electors		9,013		
Reform gain from Conservative				

Taverham
Party	Candidate	Votes	%	±%
Conservative	Stuart Clancy*	1,617	40.4	−18.7
Reform	Alice Kemp	1,109	27.7	N/A
Liberal Democrats	Caroline Karimi-Ghovanlou	746	18.7	−2.8
Green	Hannah Moody	339	8.5	+2.4
Labour Co-op	Jake Norman	187	4.7	−8.5
Majority		508	12.7	−24.9
Turnout		3,998	51.8	
Registered electors		7,735		
Conservative hold				

Thorpe St Andrew
Party	Candidate	Votes	%	±%
Conservative	Ian Mackie*	1,434	34.0	−19.7
Reform	Susan Lawn	1,047	24.9	N/A
Green	Eleanor Laming	921	21.9	−0.1
Labour	Sandra O'Neill	531	12.6	−5.5
Liberal Democrats	Phyllida Scrivens	279	6.6	+0.5
Majority		387	9.1	–22.6
Turnout		4,212	52.1	
Registered electors		8,125		
Conservative hold				

Woodside
Party	Candidate	Votes	%	±%
Reform	Wendy Atkinson	1,007	32.9	N/A
Green	Peter Harwood	665	21.7	+9.6
Conservative	Edith Jones	621	20.3	−30.3
Labour	Martin Booth	563	18.4	−15.0
Liberal Democrats	Brian Howe	208	6.8	+2.9
Majority		342	11.2	N/A
Turnout		3,064	43.0	
Registered electors		7,148		
Reform gain from Conservative				

Wroxham
Party	Candidate	Votes	%	±%
Reform	Ed Matthews	1,328	33.8	N/A
Conservative	Fran Whymark*	1,297	33.0	−29.7
Green	Andy Dawcron	675	17.2	+5.2
Liberal Democrats	Ian Leach	323	8.2	−1.8
Labour	Irene MacDoanld	306	7.8	−7.5
Majority		31	0.8	N/A
Turnout		3,929	47.5	
Registered electors		8,292		
Reform gain from Conservative				

=== Great Yarmouth ===
Division	Incumbent councillor	Party	Re-standing
Breydon	Carl Smith	Conservative	
Caister-on-Sea	Penny Carpenter	Conservative	
East Flegg	James Bensly	Conservative	
Gorleston St Andrew's	Graham Plant	Conservative	
Lothingland	Carl Annison	Conservative	
Magdalen	Colleen Walker	Labour	
West Flegg	Andy Grant	Conservative	
Yarmouth Nelson & Southtown	Mike Smith-Clare	Labour	
Yarmouth North & Central	Graham Carpenter	Conservative	

==== District summary ====
Great Yarmouth district summary
Party	Seats	+/-	Votes	%	+/-
Great Yarmouth First	9	▲6	15,627	46.0	N/A
Reform	0	Steady	6,637	19.5	+19.1
Conservative	0	▼7	4,150	12.2	–46.6
Green	0	Steady	3,641	10.7	+3.0
Labour	0	▼2	3,063	9.0	–18.5
Liberal Democrats	0	Steady	850	2.5	+0.1
Total	9	Steady	33,951	44.9	
Registered electors			75,668	–	

==== Division results ====
Breydon
Party	Candidate	Votes	%	±%
Great Yarmouth First	Michael French	1,824	46.0	N/A
Reform	Simon Cole	824	20.8	N/A
Conservative	Carl Smith	584	14.7	−48.8
Labour	Michael Jeal	318	8.0	−18.6
Green	Jess Coleman	308	7.8	+1.1
Liberal Democrats	Gerald Rouse	103	2.6	−0.7
Majority		1,000	25.2	N/A
Turnout		3,961	49.0	
Registered electors		~9,903		
Great Yarmouth First gain from Conservative				

Gorleston
Party	Candidate	Votes	%
Great Yarmouth First	Barry Gravenell	1,581	41.4
Reform	Faye Morse	618	16.2
Green	John Gethin	582	15.2
Conservative	Graham Plant	572	15.0
Labour	Jeanette McMullen	469	12.3
Majority		963	25.2
Turnout		3,822	47.2
Registered electors		~8,101	
Great Yarmouth First win (new seat)			

Lothingland
Party	Candidate	Votes	%	±%
Great Yarmouth First	Jon Wedon	1,708	43.1	N/A
Reform	Adrian Myers	816	20.6	N/A
Conservative	Carl Annison	670	16.9	−45.7
Green	Trevor Rawson	368	9.3	+4.1
Labour	Bernard Williamson	305	7.7	−11.5
Liberal Democrats	Gordon Smith	95	2.4	N/A
Majority		892	22.5	N/A
Turnout		3,962	48.3	
Registered electors		~8,203		
Great Yarmouth First gain from Conservative				

Magdalen
Party	Candidate	Votes	%	±%
Great Yarmouth First	Kevin Huggins	1,788	49.6	N/A
Reform	Nigel Light	677	18.8	N/A
Green	Damian Elliott	451	12.5	+4.3
Labour	Trevor Wainwright	429	11.9	−36.3
Conservative	Linda Phillips	261	7.2	−36.4
Majority		1,111	30.8	N/A
Turnout		3,606	41.7	
Registered electors		~8,654		
Great Yarmouth First gain from Labour				

North Caister & Ormesby
Party	Candidate	Votes	%
Great Yarmouth First	Glenn Hurren	2,072	47.9
Reform	Melanie Milligan	913	21.1
Conservative	Gary Boyd	491	11.4
Liberal Democrats	Tom Garrod	322	7.4
Green	Anne Killett	285	6.6
Labour	Brian Pilkington	241	5.6
Majority		1,159	26.8
Turnout		4,324	53.3
Registered electors		~8,119	
Great Yarmouth First win (new seat)			

South Caister & Bure
Party	Candidate	Votes	%
Great Yarmouth First	Daniel McGrath	1,852	47.0
Reform	Nicholas Dack	912	23.2
Green	Jen Denison	402	10.2
Conservative	Ivan Murray-Smith	398	10.1
Labour	Jenny Newcombe	373	9.5
Majority		940	23.8
Turnout		3,937	50.3
Registered electors		~7,833	
Great Yarmouth First win (new seat)			

The Fleggs
Party	Candidate	Votes	%
Great Yarmouth First	Jason Hughes	1,895	41.8
Reform	Adrian Rodford	901	19.9
Conservative	James Bensly	866	19.1
Green	Rebecca Durant	429	9.5
Labour	Claire Wardley	291	6.4
Liberal Democrats	Ivan Lees	150	3.3
Majority		994	21.9
Turnout		4,532	53.4
Registered electors		~8,495	
Great Yarmouth First win (new seat)			

Yarmouth Nelson & Southtown
Party	Candidate	Votes	%	±%
Great Yarmouth First	Callum Ward-Kendall	1,357	48.3	N/A
Green	Jack Allen	467	16.6	+10.2
Reform	Alexander Brown	465	16.5	+12.2
Labour	Kerry Robinson-Payne	303	10.8	−33.8
Conservative	Laura Candon	141	5.0	−35.0
Liberal Democrats	Nicholas Dyer	77	2.7	−1.9
Majority		890	31.7	N/A
Turnout		2,810	35.5	
Registered electors		~7,915		
Great Yarmouth First gain from Labour				

Yarmouth North & Central
Party	Candidate	Votes	%	±%
Great Yarmouth First	Steve Grimmer	1,533	51.2	N/A
Reform	Ricky Jeffs	511	17.1	N/A
Green	Lewis Hall	349	11.6	+7.6
Labour	Paula Waters-Bunn	334	11.1	−19.8
Conservative	Tamsin Lodge	167	5.6	−40.8
Liberal Democrats	Tony Harris	103	3.4	−0.5
Majority		1,022	34.1	N/A
Turnout		2,997	35.5	
Registered electors		~8,445		
Great Yarmouth First gain from Conservative				

=== King's Lynn & West Norfolk ===
Division	Incumbent councillor	Party	Re-standing
Clenchwarton & King's; Lynn South	Alexandra Kemp	Independent	
Dersingham	Stuart Dark	Conservative	
Docking	Michael Chenery of Horsbrugh	Conservative	
Downham Market	Anthony White	Conservative	
Feltwell	Martin Storey	Conservative	
Fincham	Brian Long	Conservative	
Freebridge Lynn	Vacant	Independent (Note: Vacant seat last held by an independent.)	
Gayton & Nar Valley	Jim Moriarty	Independent	
Gaywood North & Central	David Sayers (Note: Elected at the 2021 Gaywood South by-election.)	Liberal Democrats	
Gaywood South	Robert Colwell (Note: Elected at the 2022 Gaywood North & Central by-election.)	Liberal Democrats	
King's Lynn North & Central	Lesley Bambridge	Conservative	
Marshland North	Julian Kirk (Note: Originally elected as a Conservative, but later defected to Reform.)	Reform	
Marshland South	Chris Dawson	Conservative	
North Coast	Andrew Jamieson	Conservative	

==== District summary ====
King's Lynn & West Norfolk district summary
Party	Seats	+/-	Votes	%	+/-
Reform	12	▲11	18,918	39.8	+39.6
Liberal Democrats	1	▼1	6,556	13.8	+8.0
Independent	1	▼2	5,362	11.3	-6.1
Conservative	0	▼8	10,303	21.7	–34.8
Labour	0	Steady	3.632	7.6	–8.0
Green	0	Steady	2,532	5.3	+1.2
Monster Raving Loony	0	Steady	79	0.2	N/A
Heritage	0	Steady	77	0.2	N/A
Communist	0	Steady	39	0.1	N/A
Total	14	Steady	47,498		

==== Division results ====
Clenchwarton & Kings Lynn South
Party	Candidate	Votes	%	±%
Independent	Alexandra Kemp*	1,076	39.1	−18.8
Reform	Gary Archdale	1,064	38.7	N/A
Conservative	Sheila Young	240	8.7	−24.9
Green	Steve Rumbelow	177	6.4	N/A
Labour	Ben Jones	113	4.1	−4.4
Liberal Democrats	Ian Swinton	82	3.0	N/A
Majority		12	0.4	–23.9
Turnout		2,752		
Independent hold				

Dersingham
Party	Candidate	Votes	%	±%
Reform	Lee Jarvis	1,451	36.0	N/A
Conservative	Angie Dickinson	944	23.4	−49.7
Independent	Alistair Beales	584	14.5	N/A
Green	Naomi Howard	438	10.9	−3.7
Liberal Democrats	Keith Ives	349	8.7	+3.9
Labour	Christopher Heneghan	267	6.6	−1.0
Majority		507	12.6	N/A
Turnout		4,033		
Reform gain from Conservative				

Docking
Party	Candidate	Votes	%	±%
Reform	Julie Costley	1,508	37.7	N/A
Independent	Terry Parish	985	24.6	N/A
Conservative	Michael Chenery of Horsbrugh*	811	20.3	−36.2
Liberal Democrats	Rachael Windsor	439	11.0	N/A
Labour	Michelle Carter	255	6.4	−10.5
Majority		523	13.1	N/A
Turnout		3,998		
Reform gain from Conservative				

Downham Market
Party	Candidate	Votes	%	±%
Reform	Pat Gould	1,418	39.4	N/A
Conservative	Tony White*	686	19.1	−32.8
Liberal Democrats	Doug Dew	594	16.5	−7.3
Labour	Joshua Osborne	570	15.8	+2.0
Independent	Pallavi Devulapalli	330	9.2	N/A
Majority		732	20.3	N/A
Turnout		3,598		
Reform gain from Conservative				

Feltwell
Party	Candidate	Votes	%	±%
Reform	Sue Prigg	1,669	46.0	N/A
Conservative	Martin Storey*	975	26.8	−38.4
Liberal Democrats	Alan Holmes	612	16.9	N/A
Labour	Eamonn McCusker	299	8.2	−5.5
Heritage	Gary Conway	77	2.1	N/A
Majority		694	19.2	N/A
Turnout		3,632		
Reform gain from Conservative				

Freebridge Lynn
Party	Candidate	Votes	%	±%
Reform	Jacqueline Fry	1,285	32.6	N/A
Independent	Simon Ring	1,069	27.1	N/A
Conservative	Remi Clark	793	20.1	−44.6
Liberal Democrats	David Irving	296	7.5	N/A
Green	Fran Rumbelow	256	6.5	−13.2
Labour	Joshua Lowe	243	6.2	−9.4
Majority		216	5.5	N/A
Turnout		3,942		
Reform gain from Independent				

Gaywood North & Central
Party	Candidate	Votes	%	±%
Liberal Democrats	Rob Colwell*	1,597	45.7	+38.6
Reform	Paul Powers	1,056	30.2	N/A
Conservative	Lea McGurk	406	11.6	−44.5
Labour	Wilf Lambert	237	6.8	−26.7
Green	Ian Milburn	195	5.6	N/A
Majority		541	15.5	N/A
Turnout		3,491		
Liberal Democrats hold				

Gaywood South
Party	Candidate	Votes	%	±%
Reform	Rob Williams	791	35.6	N/A
Liberal Democrats	Stefan Dicianu	410	18.4	+7.2
Conservative	Ade Adeyemo	322	14.5	−33.8
Independent	Jo Rust	272	12.2	N/A
Green	Theresa Sarjeant	250	11.2	N/A
Labour	Tim Daniel	178	8.0	−27.6
Majority		381	17.2	N/A
Turnout		2,223		
Reform gain from Liberal Democrats				

Kings Lynn North & Central
Party	Candidate	Votes	%	±%
Reform	Ben Griffin	740	37.6	+33.5
Labour	Deborah Heneghan	319	16.2	−18.7
Green	Joel Blackmur	308	15.6	−3.0
Conservative	Lesley Bambridge*	284	14.4	−23.3
Liberal Democrats	David Mills	143	7.3	+2.5
Independent	Michael de Whalley	136	6.9	N/A
Communist	Lorraine Douglas	39	2.0	N/A
Majority		421	21.4	
Turnout		1,969		
Reform gain from Conservative		Swing	▲26.1	

Marshland North
Party	Candidate	Votes	%	±%
Reform	Julian Kirk*	1,792	56.6	N/A
Conservative	Paul McGurk	688	21.7	−36.5
Green	Rob Archer	292	9.2	N/A
Liberal Democrats	Jason Unsworth	238	7.5	N/A
Labour	Matthew Bowles	155	4.9	−9.6
Majority		1,104	34.9	N/A
Turnout		3,165		
Reform hold				

Marshland South
Party	Candidate	Votes	%	±%
Reform	Tina Kiddell	1,463	44.1	N/A
Conservative	Chris Dawson*	1,240	37.3	−25.5
Liberal Democrats	Josie Ratcliffe	347	10.4	N/A
Labour	Heather Fouracre	192	5.8	−3.7
Monster Raving Loony	Earl of Outwell	79	2.4	N/A
Majority		223	6.8	N/A
Turnout		3,321		
Reform gain from Conservative				

Nar & Wissey Valleys
Party	Candidate	Votes	%
Reform	Mike Westman	1,595	42.7
Conservative	Johnny Martin-Smith	708	19.0
Independent	Sue Lintern	640	17.2
Green	Liam Convery	356	9.5
Labour	Matthew Stirrup	222	6.0
Liberal Democrats	Graham Dent	210	5.6
Majority		887	23.7
Turnout		3,731	
Reform win (new seat)			

North Coast
Party	Candidate	Votes	%	±%
Reform	Peter Lawrence	1,283	33.2	N/A
Conservative	Peter Wilkinson	1,226	31.7	−32.4
Liberal Democrats	Tammy Edmunds	899	23.3	−3.8
Green	Alison Large	259	6.7	N/A
Labour	Kenneth Hubbard	199	5.1	−3.6
Majority		57	1.5	N/A
Turnout		3,866		
Reform gain from Conservative				

Watlington & The Fens
Party	Candidate	Votes	%
Reform	Olivia Morris	1,803	47.7
Conservative	Brian Long	980	25.9
Labour	Phillip Davies	383	10.1
Liberal Democrats	Maurice Leeke	340	9.0
Independent	Mike Knights	271	7.2
Majority		823	21.8
Turnout		3,777	
Reform win (new seat)			

=== North Norfolk ===
Division	Incumbent councillor	Party	Re-standing
Cromer	Tim Adams	Liberal Democrats	
Fakenham	Tom FitzPatrick	Conservative	
Holt	Eric Vardy	Conservative	
Hoveton & Stalham	Nigel Dixon	Conservative	
Melton Constable	Steffan Aquarone	Liberal Democrats	
Erpingham	Edward Maxfield	Independent	
North Walsham East	Lucy Shires	Liberal Democrats	
North Walsham West & Mundersley	Saul Penfold	Liberal Democrats	
Sheringham	Judy Oliver	Conservative	
South Smallburgh	Richard Price	Conservative	
Wells	Michael Dalby	Conservative	

==== District summary ====
North Norfolk district summary
Party	Seats	+/-	Votes	%	+/-
Liberal Democrats	7	▲3	17,008	40.6	+4.9
Conservative	2	▼4	8,353	19.9	–24.5
Reform	1	▲1	13,363	31.9	N/A
Green	0	Steady	2,810	6.7	–0.2
Labour	0	Steady	1,099	2.6	–4.6
Independent	0	▼1	41	0.1	–5.6
Total	10	▼1	42,022	49.6	
Registered electors			84,659	–	

==== Division results ====
Cromer
Party	Candidate	Votes	%	±%
Liberal Democrats	Tim Adams*	2,506	58.8	+4.4
Reform	Benjamin Miles	1,138	26.7	N/A
Conservative	Angela Fitch-Tillett	365	8.6	−24.8
Green	Rupert Eris	172	4.0	−1.8
Labour	David Batley	80	1.9	−4.6
Majority		1,368	32.1	+11.1
Turnout		4,271	51.5	
Registered electors		8,297		
Liberal Democrats hold				

Erpingham
Party	Candidate	Votes	%
Liberal Democrats	Callum Ringer	2,048	47.9
Reform	DeeDee Lomax	1,265	29.6
Conservative	Nicholas Coppack	602	14.1
Green	Stephen Green	295	6.9
Labour	Sarah Freestone	67	1.6
Majority		783	18.3
Turnout		4,292	53.6
Registered electors		8,010	
Liberal Democrats win (new seat)			

Fakenham & The Raynhams
Party	Candidate	Votes	%
Reform	Robert Jamieson	1,317	37.7
Conservative	Tom Fitzpatrick*	1,049	30.0
Green	Joe Leverett	490	14.0
Liberal Democrats	Mollie Stephens	378	10.8
Labour	Abbie Elton	221	6.3
Independent	Eric Masters	41	1.2
Majority		268	7.7
Turnout		3,504	40.7
Registered electors		8,600	
Reform win (new seat)			

Holt
Party	Candidate	Votes	%	±%
Liberal Democrats	Andrew Brown	1,783	41.6	+3.8
Reform	Steven Ribbons	1,336	31.2	N/A
Conservative	Clive Hallam	817	19.1	−28.5
Green	Mike Bossingham	258	6.0	−2.6
Labour	Martyn Sloman	92	2.1	−4.0
Majority		447	10.4	N/A
Turnout		4,304	50.7	
Registered electors		8,494		
Liberal Democrats gain from Conservative				

Hoveton
Party	Candidate	Votes	%
Liberal Democrats	Adam Varley	1,833	39.6
Reform	Jason Patchett	1,686	36.5
Conservative	Kevin Bayes	778	16.8
Green	Diane Wiles	234	5.1
Labour	Frances Kemp	93	2.0
Majority		147	3.1
Turnout		4,636	54.1
Registered electors		8,578	
Liberal Democrats win (new seat)			

North Walsham East
Party	Candidate	Votes	%	±%
Liberal Democrats	Lucy Shires*	1,844	49.8	+5.9
Reform	Robert Reid	1,287	34.8	N/A
Conservative	Pauline Porter	352	9.5	−32.8
Green	Mike Ward	163	4.4	−2.0
Labour	Rachel Rising	55	1.5	−5.8
Majority		557	15.0	+13.4
Turnout		3,707	46.4	
Registered electors		7,995		
Liberal Democrats hold				

North Walsham West & Mundesley
Party	Candidate	Votes	%
Liberal Democrats	Mal Gray	1,531	41.0
Reform	Oliver Ward	1,426	38.2
Conservative	Rob Scammell	461	12.3
Green	Ray Mooney	237	6.3
Labour	Jasper Haywood	82	2.2
Majority		105	2.8
Turnout		3,752	46.5
Registered electors		8,073	
Liberal Democrats win (new seat)			

Sheringham
Party	Candidate	Votes	%	±%
Liberal Democrats	Liz Withington	2,110	46.0	+8.8
Reform	Gary Hughes	1,253	27.3	N/A
Conservative	Greg Battha-Pajor	800	17.5	−33.6
Green	Edmund Wright	339	7.4	+2.6
Labour	Matthew Reilly	82	1.8	−3.7
Majority		857	18.7	N/A
Turnout		4,599	52.1	
Registered electors		8,829		
Liberal Democrats gain from Conservative				

Stalham
Party	Candidate	Votes	%
Conservative	Matthew Taylor	1,701	37.6
Reform	Kevin Corrigan	1,488	32.9
Liberal Democrats	Tyler Wragg	924	20.4
Green	Elizabeth Dixon	295	6.5
Labour	Richard Stowe	115	2.5
Majority		213	4.7
Turnout		4,534	51.2
Registered electors		8,851	
Conservative win (new seat)			

Wells
Party	Candidate	Votes	%	±%
Conservative	Victoria Holliday	1,428	32.4	−17.4
Liberal Democrats	Roy MacDonald	1,274	28.9	−5.8
Reform	Julia Reid	1,167	26.5	N/A
Green	James Whitehead	327	7.4	−0.3
Labour	William Gee	212	4.8	−3.0
Majority		154	3.5	–11.6
Turnout		4,423	49.5	
Registered electors		8,932		
Conservative hold		Swing	▼5.8	

=== Norwich ===
Division	Incumbent councillor	Party	Re-standing
Bowthorpe	Mike Sands	Labour	Yes
Catton Grove	Steve Morphew	Labour	No
Crome	Alison Birmingham	Labour	No
Eaton	Brian Watkins	Liberal Democrats	Yes
Lakenham	Brenda Jones	Labour	No
Mancroft	Serene Shibli (Note: Elected at the 2025 Mancroft by-election.)	Green	Yes
Mile Cross	Chrissie Rumsby	Labour	Yes
Nelson	Paul Neale	Green	Yes
Sewell	Julie Brociek-Coulton	Labour	No
Thorpe Hamlet	Ben Price	Green	No
Town Close	Vacant	Labour (Note: Vacant seat last held by Labour.)	
University	Matthew Reilly	Labour	No
Wensum	Vacant	Labour	

==== District summary ====
Norwich city summary
Party	Seats	+/-	Votes	%	+/-
Green	10	▲7	19,849	42.7	+18.6
Reform	2	▲2	9,651	20.8	N/A
Liberal Democrats	1	Steady	4,199	9.0	+1.4
Labour	0	▼9	9,899	21.3	–23.6
Conservative	0	Steady	3,135	6.7	–16.0
Communist	0	Steady	37	0.1	N/A
Total	13	Steady	46,771	44.8	
Registered electors			104,373	–	

==== Division results ====
Bowthorpe
Party	Candidate	Votes	%	±%
Green	Amber Smith	980	34.6	N/A
Reform	Nick Taylor	898	31.7	N/A
Labour	Mike Sands*	673	23.8	−30.5
Conservative	Rebeka Jones	170	6.0	−23.0
Liberal Democrats	Neil Hardman	110	3.9	−1.6
Majority		82	2.9	N/A
Turnout		3,132	38.6	
Registered electors		8,206		
Green gain from Labour				

Catton Grove
Party	Candidate	Votes	%	±%
Reform	Mike Conroy	988	30.6	N/A
Green	Tony Park	919	28.5	+17.2
Labour Co-op	George Heaney	857	26.6	−23.3
Conservative	Samuel Walker	286	8.9	−25.9
Liberal Democrats	Nigel Lubbock	174	5.4	+1.4
Majority		69	2.1	N/A
Turnout		3,224	40.3	
Registered electors		8,023		
Reform gain from Labour Co-op				

Crome
Party	Candidate	Votes	%	±%
Reform	Tim Day	1,175	35.0	N/A
Labour	Paul Guille	933	27.8	−17.4
Green	Richard Edwards	763	22.7	+12.5
Conservative	Tod James	310	9.2	−31.6
Liberal Democrats	Philip Jimemez	175	5.2	+1.4
Majority		242	7.2	N/A
Turnout		3,356	40.4	
Registered electors		8,327		
Reform gain from Labour				

Eaton
Party	Candidate	Votes	%	±%
Liberal Democrats	Brian Watkins*	1,967	41.9	+2.6
Green	Jane Saunders	932	19.8	+10.3
Reform	Thomas Waterhouse	729	15.5	N/A
Labour	Bert Bremner	619	13.2	−14.9
Conservative	Iain Gwynn	453	9.6	−13.6
Majority		1,035	22.1	+10.9
Turnout		4,700	59.3	
Registered electors		7,995		
Liberal Democrats hold		Swing	▼3.9	

Lakenham
Party	Candidate	Votes	%	±%
Green	Tom Ludson	1,272	38.2	N/A
Labour	Rosemary Duff	848	25.5	−30.4
Reform	Richard Eminson	831	25.0	N/A
Conservative	Robert Hammond	222	6.7	−24.8
Liberal Democrats	Carol Chilton	157	4.7	−8.0
Majority		424	12.7	N/A
Turnout		3,330	42.5	
Registered electors		7,871		
Green gain from Labour				

Mancroft
Party	Candidate	Votes	%	±%
Green	Serene Shibli*	1,718	56.1	+4.2
Reform	Paul Buckland	584	19.1	N/A
Labour	Cavan Stewart	418	13.7	−19.5
Conservative	Sing Lee	186	6.1	−8.8
Liberal Democrats	Clara Lynch	155	5.1	N/A
Majority		1,134	37.0	+18.3
Turnout		3,061	40.4	
Registered electors		7,602		
Green hold				

Mile Cross
Party	Candidate	Votes	%	±%
Green	Helena Wysocki	1,446	48.2	+31.1
Reform	Craig Barker	880	29.3	N/A
Labour Co-op	Chrissie Rumsby*	415	13.8	−36.0
Conservative	Georgi Dimitrov	155	5.2	−22.9
Liberal Democrats	Sean Bennett	105	3.5	−1.4
Majority		566	18.9	N/A
Turnout		3,001	37.8	
Registered electors		7,978		
Green gain from Labour Co-op				

Nelson
Party	Candidate	Votes	%	±%
Green	Paul Neale*	2,890	60.7	+12.6
Labour	Michael Howard	1,045	22.0	−21.7
Reform	Richard Edmunds	364	7.6	N/A
Liberal Democrats	Marlowe North	227	4.8	N/A
Conservative	John Ward	197	4.1	−4.1
Communist	James Nutman	37	0.8	N/A
Majority		1,845	38.7	+34.3
Turnout		4,760	58.6	
Registered electors		8,188		
Green hold		Swing	▲17.2	

Sewell
Party	Candidate	Votes	%	±%
Green	Jenny Knight	2,346	61.3	+21.1
Labour	Michelle Gergory	604	15.8	−29.5
Reform	Alexander Stevens	563	14.7	N/A
Conservative	Christine Mackie	159	4.2	−8.6
Liberal Democrats	Helen Arundell	155	4.1	+2.5
Majority		1,742	45.5	N/A
Turnout		3,827	49.2	
Registered electors		7,849		
Green gain from Labour		Swing	▲25.3	

Thorpe Hamlet
Party	Candidate	Votes	%	±%
Green	Jo Smith	1,635	43.4	+0.8
Labour	Jane Overhill	1,054	28.0	−8.8
Reform	Alan Mallett	587	15.6	N/A
Conservative	Simon Jones	317	8.4	−12.2
Liberal Democrats	Jeremy Hooke	174	4.6	N/A
Majority		581	15.4	+9.6
Turnout		3,767	46.1	
Registered electors		8,223		
Green hold		Swing	▲4.8	

Town Close
Party	Candidate	Votes	%	±%
Green	Maxine Webb	1,907	44.3	+26.6
Labour Co-op	Lisa Alston	1,315	30.5	−23.4
Reform	Mark Broome	534	12.4	N/A
Conservative	Mary Chacksfield	356	8.3	−13.3
Liberal Democrats	David Fairbairn	197	4.6	−2.2
Majority		592	13.8	N/a
Turnout		4,309	52.9	
Registered electors		8,176		
Green gain from Labour Co-op		Swing	▲25.0	

University
Party	Candidate	Votes	%	±%
Green	Niall Adams	1,192	42.4	+20.3
Labour Co-op	Laura McCartney-Gray	538	19.2	−32.5
Reform	Jenny Ashburn	530	18.9	N/A
Liberal Democrats	James Hawketts	433	15.4	+9.2
Conservative	Tommy Best	116	4.1	−15.8
Majority		654	23.2	N/A
Turnout		2,809	41.3	
Registered electors		6,831		
Green gain from Labour Co-op		Swing	▲26.4	

Wensum
Party	Candidate	Votes	%	±%
Green	Ben Price	1,740	49.8	+28.9
Reform	Kevin Spilling	883	25.3	N/A
Labour Co-op	Maggie Wheeler	542	15.5	−36.6
Conservative	John Fisher	184	5.3	−17.7
Liberal Democrats	Gordon Dean	146	4.2	+0.2
Majority		857	24.5	N/A
Turnout		3,495	38.5	
Registered electors		9,104		
Green gain from Labour Co-op				

=== South Norfolk ===
Division	Incumbent councillor	Party	Re-standing
Clavering	Barry Stone	Conservative	
Costessey	Sharon Blundell	Liberal Democrats	No
Diss & Roydon	Vacant	Conservative (Note: Vacant seat last held by the Conservatives.)	
East Depwade	Martin Wilby	Conservative	No
Forehoe	Daniel Elmer	Conservative	Yes
Henstead	Vic Thomson	Conservative	Yes
Hingham	Margaret Dewsbury	Conservative	Yes
Humbleyard	David Bills	Conservative	
Loddon	Kay Billig	Conservative	Yes
Long Stratton	Alison Thomas	Conservative	No
West Depwade	Catherine Rowett (Note: Elected at the 2025 West Depwade by-election.)	Green	No
Wymondham	Robert Savage	Conservative	Yes

==== District summary ====
South Norfolk district summary
Party	Seats	+/-	Votes	%	+/-
Reform	7	▲7	16,611	29.5	+29.3
Conservative	3	▼8	13,224	23.5	–26.7
Green	1	▲1	10,280	18.2	+8.6
Liberal Democrats	1	Steady	7,108	12.6	-7.3
Labour	1	Steady	6,238	11.1	–6.8
Independent	0	Steady	2,886	5.1	+2.9
Total	13		56,357		

==== Division results ====
Costessey
Party	Candidate	Votes	%	±%
Reform	David Henson	1,384	32.6	N/A
Independent	Gary Blundell	987	23.2	N/A
Liberal Democrats	Terry Laidlaw	628	14.8	−23.1
Green	James Edwards-Scott	473	11.1	+3.4
Conservative	Joshua Woolliscroft	408	9.6	−24.8
Labour	Jenny McCloskey	366	8.6	−11.3
Majority		397	9.4	N/A
Turnout		4,246	44.2	
Registered electors		9,626		
Reform gain from Liberal Democrats				

Diss & Roydon
Party	Candidate	Votes	%	±%
Green	Will Porteous	1,244	34.3	+25.1
Reform	Colin Sutton	1,166	32.2	N/A
Conservative	Graham Minshull	935	25.8	−27.8
Labour	Pam Reekie	142	3.9	−12.2
Liberal Democrats	Trevor Wenman	137	3.8	−17.3
Majority		78	2.1	N/A
Turnout		3,624	43.1	
Registered electors		8,441		
Green gain from Conservative				

East Depwade
Party	Candidate	Votes	%	±%
Reform	Joseph Kerrison	1,300	28.9	N/A
Green	Ed Gillespie	1,178	26.1	+14.0
Independent	Clayton Hudson	925	20.5	N/A
Conservative	Trevor Graham	762	16.9	−45.6
Labour	James Eddy	222	4.9	−12.1
Liberal Democrats	Murray Gray	118	2.6	−5.7
Majority		122	2.8	N/A
Turnout		4,505	48.7	
Registered electors		9,275		
Reform gain from Conservative				

Forehoe
Party	Candidate	Votes	%	±%
Conservative	Daniel Elmer*	1,184	28.3	−17.3
Reform	Deborah Barker	919	22.0	+20.2
Labour	Deborah Sacks	769	18.4	+3.5
Green	Carol Sharp	682	16.3	+6.1
Liberal Democrats	Ian Spratt	629	15.0	−12.5
Majority		265	6.3	–11.8
Turnout		4,183	49.6	
Registered electors		8,467		
Conservative hold		Swing	▼18.8	

Henstead
Party	Candidate	Votes	%	±%
Liberal Democrats	Jim Webber	1,352	29.6	+1.5
Reform	John Wilkinson	1,282	28.1	N/A
Conservative	Vic Thomson*	904	19.8	−27.1
Green	Martin Beckett	621	13.6	+2.6
Labour	Joshua Horsfall	401	8.8	−5.3
Majority		70	1.5	N/A
Turnout		4,560	52.4	
Registered electors		8,745		
Liberal Democrats gain from Conservative				

Hethersett
Party	Candidate	Votes	%
Labour	Ben Weston	1,158	26.35
Reform	Peter Barker	1,155	26.28
Conservative	Kathryn Cross	1,133	25.8
Green	Rachel Barrett	551	12.5
Liberal Democrats	Steve Witt	398	9.1
Majority		3	0.07
Turnout		4,395	50.4
Registered electors		8,756	
Labour win (new seat)			

Hingham
Party	Candidate	Votes	%	±%
Reform	Gary Douglas-Beet	1,182	30.4	N/A
Liberal Democrats	Suzanne Nuri-Nixon	1,008	25.9	+16.2
Conservative	Margaret Dewsbury*	851	21.9	−38.9
Green	Victoria Walters	525	13.5	−2.8
Labour	Debbie Rowden	319	8.2	−5.0
Majority		174	4.5	N/A
Turnout		3,885	47.2	
Registered electors		8,247		
Reform gain from Conservative				

Loddon
Party	Candidate	Votes	%	±%
Conservative	Kay Mason Billig*	1,483	28.9	−25.0
Reform	Alexander Ashman	1,381	26.9	N/A
Labour	Jeremy Rowe	1,194	23.3	−13.6
Green	Ed Wareham	680	13.3	N/A
Liberal Democrats	Neil Humphries	392	7.6	−1.6
Majority		102	2.0	–15.0
Turnout		5,130	52.7	
Registered electors		9,759		
Conservative hold				

Long Stratton
Party	Candidate	Votes	%	±%
Reform	Karl Catchpole	1,517	34.6	N/A
Independent	John Cook	974	22.2	N/A
Conservative	John Hemmant	669	15.3	−47.4
Green	Claire Sparkes	582	13.3	+3.5
Liberal Democrats	Bob McClenning	339	7.7	−1.5
Labour	Ann Reeder	299	6.8	−11.5
Majority		543	12.4	N/A
Turnout		4,380	48.8	
Registered electors		9,004		
Reform gain from Conservative				

Waveney Valley
Party	Candidate	Votes	%
Reform	George Boyd	1,562	34.6
Conservative	Barry Stone	1,007	22.3
Green	Vinod Mahtani	891	19.7
Liberal Democrats	Peter Harrison	796	17.6
Labour	David Reekie	263	5.8
Majority		555	12.3
Turnout		4,519	51.6
Registered electors		8,788	
Reform win (new seat)			

West Depwade
Party	Candidate	Votes	%	±%
Reform	Margaret Thomas	1,611	34.3	N/A
Conservative	Kim Carsok	1,374	29.3	−14.3
Green	Christina Kenna	1,265	26.9	+17.6
Liberal Democrats	Jacqueline Ives	284	6.0	−4.5
Labour	Alyson Read	163	3.5	−9.3
Majority		237	5.0	N/A
Turnout		4,697	55.8	
Registered electors		8,447		
Reform gain from Green				

Wymondham
Party	Candidate	Votes	%	±%
Conservative	Robert Savage*	1,433	35.2	−11.1
Reform	Gokce Schuler	1,004	24.6	N/A
Green	Paul Barrett	715	17.5	+10.9
Liberal Democrats	Dave Roberts	521	12.8	−20.1
Labour	Lowell Doheny	402	9.9	−4.2
Majority		429	10.6	−2.8
Turnout		4,075	49.1	
Registered electors		8,329		
Conservative hold				

Yare Valley
Party	Candidate	Votes	%
Reform	Malcolm Latarche	1,148	27.7
Conservative	Richard Elliott	1,081	26.1
Green	Dave Evans	873	21.0
Labour	Justin Cork	540	13.0
Liberal Democrats	Des Fulcher	506	12.2
Majority		67	1.6
Turnout		4,148	41.9
Registered electors		9,916	
Reform win (new seat)			

== Post-election changes ==
=== By-elections ===
==== Old Catton ====
The by-election was triggered by the resignation of Reform UK councillor Mark Tucker, who stood down 25 days after winning the seat in May 2026, citing ill health.

Old Catton by-election: 16 July 2026
Party	Candidate	Votes	%	±%
Conservative	Antony Little	973	34.6	+8.5
Green	Phoebe Connell	921	32.7	+13.9
Reform	Sue Lawn	561	19.9	−10.1
Labour Co-op	Jake Norman	147	5.2	−10.7
Liberal Democrats	Martin Callam	100	3.6	−5.6
Restore	Hamish Williams	98	3.5	New
Monster Raving Loony	His Excellency Freeman	13	0.5	New
Majority		52	1.8	N/A
Rejected ballots		6	0.2	
Turnout		2,819	39.9	−7.8
Registered electors		7,070		
Conservative gain from Reform		Swing	▲9.3	
