= 2023 Great Yarmouth Borough Council election =

2023 UK local government election

- 4 May 2023

All 39 seats to Great Yarmouth Borough Council 20 seats needed for a majority

	First party	Second party	Third party
Leader	Carl Smith	Trevor Wainwright
Party	Conservative	Labour	Independent
Last election	20 seats, 52.2%	15 seats, 36.6%	3 seats, 7.6%
Seats before	21	14	4
Seats after	19	18	2
- The winner of each seat in the 2023 Great Yarmouth Borough Council Election
Leader before election
Carl Smith
Conservative
Leader after election
Carl Smith
Conservative
No overall control

The 2023 Great Yarmouth Borough Council election took place on 4 May 2023 to elect members of Great Yarmouth Borough Council in Norfolk, England. This was on the same day as other local elections in England.

Prior to the election the council was under Conservative majority control. The Conservatives remained the largest party after the election, but lost their majority leaving the council under no overall control. A minority Conservative administration formed after the election with the support of the two independent councillors.

== Summary ==
=== Election result ===
2023 Great Yarmouth Borough Council election
Party	Candidates	Seats	Gains	Losses	Net gain/loss	Seats %	Votes %	Votes	+/−
Conservative	39	19	1	2	▼1	48.7	43.6	19,247	–8.6
Labour	39	18	3	0	▲3	46.2	45.7	20,174	+7.2
Independent	7	2	0	1	▼1	5.1	6.8	3,018	–0.8
Green	5	0	0	0	Steady	0.0	2.0	889	N/A
Liberal Democrats	7	0	0	0	Steady	0.0	1.5	660	N/A
Reform	2	0	0	0	Steady	0.0	0.4	192	N/A
UKIP	0	0	0	1	▼1	0.0	N/A	N/A	–2.7

== Ward results ==
The Statement of Persons Nominated, which details the candidates standing in each ward, was released by Great Yarmouth Borough Council following the close of nominations on 4 April 2023. The results for each ward were as follows, with an asterisk (*) indicating an incumbent councillor standing for re-election.

=== Bradwell North ===
Bradwell North (3 seats)
Party	Candidate	Votes	%	±%
Conservative	Carl Smith*	888	52.6	−1.3
Conservative	Daniel Candon*	839	49.7	+3.4
Conservative	Graham Plant*	815	48.3	−11.3
Labour	Yvonne Craig	765	45.3	+1.1
Labour	Scott Wesson	756	44.8	N/A
Labour	James Borg	728	43.1	N/A
Turnout		1,705	33.2	
Rejected ballots		17	1.0	
Registered electors		5,130		
Conservative hold				
Conservative hold				
Conservative hold				

=== Bradwell South & Hopton ===
Bradwell South & Hopton (3 seats)
Party	Candidate	Votes	%	±%
Conservative	Carl Annison*	995	54.0	−12.3
Conservative	Katy Stenhouse*	740	40.2	−10.9
Labour	Anthony Capewell	738	40.1	N/A
Conservative	Robert Price	690	37.5	−17.1
Labour	Lesley Rodin	680	36.9	N/A
Labour	David Greggs	660	35.8	+0.3
Independent	Sue Hacon*	207	11.2	−43.4
Liberal Democrats	Mark Godfrey	119	6.5	N/A
Liberal Democrats	John Shreeve	89	4.8	N/A
Turnout		1,851	28.6	
Rejected ballots		9	0.5	
Registered electors		6,462		
Conservative hold				
Conservative hold				
Labour gain from Conservative				

=== Caister North ===
Caister North (2 seats)
Party	Candidate	Votes	%	±%
Conservative	Penny Carpenter*	606	54.8	−7.8
Conservative	Gary Boyd	582	52.7	−9.8
Labour	Michael Winterburn	402	36.4	+1.4
Labour	Rae Williamson-Aldous	320	29.0	N/A
Green	Anne Killett	174	15.7	N/A
Turnout		1,114	30.4	
Rejected ballots		9	0.8	
Registered electors		3,670		
Conservative hold				
Conservative hold				

=== Caister South ===
Caister South (2 seats)
Party	Candidate	Votes	%	±%
Conservative	Brian Lawn*	604	56.2	−7.5
Conservative	Malcolm Bird*	570	53.0	−7.8
Labour	Sandra Griffiths	468	43.5	+6.6
Labour	Michael Moore	374	34.8	+4.3
Turnout		1,089	30.3	
Rejected ballots		14	1.3	
Registered electors		3,598		
Conservative hold				
Conservative hold				

=== Central & Northgate ===
Central & Northgate (3 seats)
Party	Candidate	Votes	%	±%
Labour	Michael Smith-Clare	596	52.9	+11.4
Labour	Jade Martin	578	51.3	+13.1
Labour	Cathy Cordiner-Achenbach	574	50.9	+16.4
Conservative	Tamsin Lodge	318	28.2	+5.6
Conservative	Oscar Houseago	295	26.2	+5.0
Conservative	Aurelio Spinola	258	22.9	+6.6
Independent	Carrie Talbot*	228	20.2	−15.4
Liberal Democrats	Christopher Ashton-Barnes	153	13.6	N/A
Turnout		1,133	19.6	
Rejected ballots		6	0.5	
Registered electors		5,768		
Labour hold				
Labour hold				
Labour gain from UKIP				

=== Claydon ===
Claydon
Party	Candidate	Votes	%	±%
Labour	Carol Borg*	810	64.6	+3.0
Labour	Jeanette McMullen	775	61.9	+6.4
Labour	Bernard Williamson*	767	61.2	+8.0
Conservative	Linda Phillips	403	32.2	−2.9
Conservative	John Hirst	363	29.0	−4.1
Conservative	Louise Bensly	362	28.9	−0.9
Turnout		1,269	22.5	
Rejected ballots		16	1.3	
Registered electors		5,641		
Labour hold				
Labour hold				
Labour hold				

=== East Flegg ===
East Flegg (2 seats)
Party	Candidate	Votes	%	±%
Conservative	James Bensly*	755	61.3	−12.9
Conservative	Noel Galer*	573	46.5	−13.4
Green	Emma Punchard	297	24.1	N/A
Labour	Paul Hendry	245	19.9	−8.0
Labour	Colleen Walker	230	18.7	N/A
Green	Kenneth Petersen	206	16.7	N/A
Turnout		1,244	31.0	
Rejected ballots		12	1.0	
Registered electors		4,008		
Conservative hold				
Conservative hold				

=== Fleggburgh ===
Fleggburgh
Party	Candidate	Votes	%	±%
Independent	Adrian Thompson*	1,110	94.6	+10.5
Conservative	Thomas Garrod	37	3.2	−8.9
Labour	Claire Wardley	26	2.2	−1.6
Majority		1,073	91.4	+19.4
Turnout		1,174	53.4	
Rejected ballots		1	0.1	
Registered electors		2,200		
Independent hold		Swing	▲9.7	

=== Gorleston ===
Gorleston (2 seats)
Party	Candidate	Votes	%	±%
Conservative	Emma Flaxman-Taylor*	685	48.9	−10.2
Conservative	Paul Wells*	674	48.1	−10.0
Labour	Stephen Taylor	508	36.3	−2.2
Labour	Andrew Wemyss	457	32.6	N/A
Green	Rebecca Durant	111	7.9	N/A
Green	Nicola Albon	101	7.2	N/A
Liberal Democrats	Gerald Rouse	69	4.9	N/A
Liberal Democrats	Gordon Smith	65	4.6	N/A
Turnout		1,404	34.0	
Rejected ballots		4	0.3	
Registered electors		4,132		
Conservative hold				
Conservative hold				

=== Lothingland ===
Lothingland (2 seats)
Party	Candidate	Votes	%	±%
Conservative	Graham Carpenter	518	41.9	−4.8
Conservative	Ivan Murray-Smith	508	41.1	+4.8
Independent	Adrian Myers*	469	37.9	−13.0
Labour	Christine Williamson	388	31.4	+6.0
Labour	Euan Duffield	304	24.6	N/A
Turnout		1,239	29.0	
Rejected ballots		3	0.2	
Registered electors		4,274		
Conservative gain from Independent				
Conservative hold				

=== Magdalen ===
Magdalen (3 seats)
Party	Candidate	Votes	%	±%
Labour	Trevor Wainwright*	786	59.7	−1.6
Labour	Alison Green	691	52.5	−6.6
Labour	Brian Pilkington	642	48.8	−8.4
Independent	Matthew Smith	386	29.3	N/A
Conservative	Robert Whitaker	349	26.5	−9.2
Conservative	Susan O'Dell	323	24.5	−7.6
Conservative	Tracy Cameron	277	21.0	−7.1
Turnout		1,318	25.1	
Rejected ballots		2	0.2	
Registered electors		5,252		
Labour hold				
Labour hold				
Labour hold				

=== Nelson ===
Nelson (3 seats)
Party	Candidate	Votes	%	±%
Labour	Michael Jeal*	552	61.6	+9.2
Labour	Tony Wright*	515	57.5	+6.6
Labour	Kerry Robinson-Payne*	513	57.3	+10.0
Conservative	Oliver Bensly	248	27.7	+8.8
Conservative	Ann Lawn	221	24.7	+9.3
Conservative	Richard Stafferton	200	22.3	+7.5
Reform	Michael Riley	118	13.2	−12.9
Turnout		905	17.0	
Rejected ballots		9	1.0	
Registered electors		5,339		
Labour hold				
Labour hold				
Labour hold				

=== Ormesby ===
Ormesby
Party	Candidate	Votes	%	±%
Independent	Justin Rundle	548	44.8	−13.1
Conservative	Geoffrey Freeman*	514	42.1	−6.9
Conservative	Ron Hanton	511	41.8	+3.8
Labour	Malcolm Boocock	366	30.0	+14.4
Labour	Brian Walker	201	16.4	N/A
Turnout		1,224	31.9	
Rejected ballots		2	0.2	
Registered electors		3,832		
Independent hold				
Conservative hold				

=== Southtown & Cobholm ===
Southtown & Cobholm (2 seats)
Party	Candidate	Votes	%	±%
Labour	Paula Waters-Bunn*	405	57.9	−0.4
Labour	Jennifer Newcombe	402	57.5	−5.4
Conservative	Laura Candon	220	31.5	−2.9
Conservative	Alvin Murray	191	27.3	−1.8
Liberal Democrats	Nicholas Dyer	77	11.0	N/A
Turnout		705	19.4	
Rejected ballots		6	0.9	
Registered electors		3,633		
Labour hold				
Labour hold				

=== St Andrews ===
St Andrews
Party	Candidate	Votes	%	±%
Labour	Barbara Wright*	575	63.3	+3.3
Labour	Ronald Upton	555	61.1	−0.1
Conservative	Alan Popham	310	34.1	−2.1
Conservative	Lionel O'Dell	276	30.4	−5.3
Turnout		917	25.9	
Rejected ballots		9	1.0	
Registered electors		3,542		
Labour hold				
Labour hold				

=== West Flegg ===
West Flegg (2 seats)
Party	Candidate	Votes	%	±%
Conservative	Andy Grant*	809	60.5	−0.2
Conservative	Leslie Mogford*	798	59.6	+2.2
Labour	Matthew Borg	467	34.9	−2.1
Labour	David Jeal	458	34.2	N/A
Turnout		1,361	31.4	
Rejected ballots		23	1.7	
Registered electors		4,336		
Conservative hold				
Conservative hold				

=== Yarmouth North ===
Yarmouth North (2 seats)
Party	Candidate	Votes	%	±%
Conservative	Donna Hammond*	470	43.5	+5.7
Labour	Amy Sharp	453	41.9	+6.2
Conservative	Paul Hammond*	452	41.8	+5.9
Labour	James McCluskey	444	41.1	+9.6
Liberal Democrats	Anthony Harris	88	8.1	N/A
Reform	Angela Andrews	74	6.8	N/A
Independent	Paul Toplass	70	6.5	N/A
Turnout		1,083	31.7	
Rejected ballots		2	0.2	
Registered electors		3,418		
Conservative hold				
Labour gain from Conservative				

== Changes 2023–2027 ==
=== By-elections ===
==== Central & Northgate ====
A by-election was held on 29 February 2024 to fill the vacancy left by Labour councillor Mike Smith-Clare. Labour held the seat.

Central & Northgate by-election: 29 February 2024
Party	Candidate	Votes	%	±%
Labour	James Dwyer-McCluskey	482	52.6	+6.6
Conservative	Paul Hammond	296	32.3	+7.7
Liberal Democrats	Tony Harris	139	15.2	+3.4
Majority		186	20.3	N/A
Turnout		925	15.6	–4.0
Rejected ballots		8	0.9	
Registered electors		5,945		
Labour hold		Swing	▼0.6	

==== Caister South ====
A by-election was held on 7 May 2026 after the death of Conservative councillor Malcolm Bird. Great Yarmouth First gained the seat from the Conservatives.

Caister South by-election: 7 May 2026
Party	Candidate	Votes	%	±%
Great Yarmouth First	Jon Wedon	866	48.7	N/A
Reform	Sandra Sherman-Ceesay	405	22.8	N/A
Conservative	Ann Lawn	214	12.0	−44.3
Green	Ollie Hodds	139	7.8	N/A
Labour	Chris Williamson	116	6.5	−37.2
Liberal Democrats	Nick Dyer	39	2.2	N/A
Majority		461	25.9	N/A
Turnout		1,787	49.5	+19.2
Rejected ballots		8	0.4	
Registered electors		3,607		
Great Yarmouth First gain from Conservative		Swing		

The result was taken from the council's published by-election results.
