= Charlie Downes =

English political activist (born 2001)

Spokesman For Restore Britain
- Incumbent
- Assumed office 2025
- Leader: Rupert Lowe
- Preceded by: Position established

Campaigns Director For Restore Britain
- Incumbent
- Assumed office 2025
- Preceded by: Position established

Personal details
- Born: Charlie Fraser Downes; June 2001 (age 25) Kent, England
- Party: Restore Britain (since 2025)
- Other political affiliations: Reform UK (2024–2025)
- Education: Royal Holloway, University of London (BA)
- Known for: Political commentary
- Website: cfdownes.uk

Charlie Fraser Downes (born June 2001) is an English far right political activist, writer and broadcaster. He has served as the Campaigns Director and Spokesman for Restore Britain since the party was established as a pressure group in 2025. He is also a contributor to The European Conservative and the Daily Mail.

== Early life and education ==
Downes was brought up in Kent, England. He holds a degree in Politics and International Relations from Royal Holloway, University of London.

== Career ==
=== Writing and broadcasting ===
After graduating, Downes worked as a freelance writer and political commentator, contributing to outlets including TalkTV, GB News, the Daily Mail, and The European Conservative. He has also appeared on LBC. He co-hosts Radio Britannia on GB News alongside Alice Grant.

Downes maintains a personal website and a Substack publication, where he writes on British politics, culture, and national identity.

=== 2024 London mayoral election ===
In September 2023, Downes joined the campaign team of Andreas Michli, an independent candidate who stood in the 2024 London mayoral election. He served as Michli's campaign manager, and the campaign gathered over 26,000 first-preference votes.

=== Reform UK ===
In September 2024, Downes attended Reform UK's national party conference, where he appeared in official party promotional content alongside party leader Nigel Farage. At a fringe event during the same conference, he called for Reform UK to adopt a policy of "remigration".

=== Restore Britain ===
Downes has served as the Campaigns Director of Restore Britain and Spokesperson for the organisation since its inception. The organisation launched as a pressure group on 30 June 2025 before registering as a political party on 13 February 2026. The organisation describes itself as advocating for net-negative immigration, a smaller state, and the promotion of British national identity.

In November 2026 Restore Britain announced he would be the prospective parliamentary candidate for the Sittingbourne and Sheppey constituency for the next general election.

== Controversies ==
=== Ofcom complaints (2025) ===
In February 2025, Ofcom received 73 complaints following remarks Downes made during a debate broadcast on GB News, which complainants characterised as transphobic. The conversation was based on a study which found children are 50 times more likely to suffer from “gender distress” than a decade before.

=== Hope not Hate report (2025) ===
In February 2025, the UK special interest group Hope not Hate published a report labelling Downes as a "far-right activist" and noting that he had praised Enoch Powell and spoken at anti-migrant demonstrations. The report drew attention to his attendance at an event held in the House of Lords, sponsored by Conservative peer Lord Moylan. The report documented that he had written that "remigration is a political and demographic necessity".

=== Anti-Semitism ===
Reform UK accused Downes of being anti-Semitic in August 2026 after Downes had appeared to imply that their leader, Nigel Farage, was influenced by Jewish supporters.

== Political views ==
Downes has described himself as a 'traditionalist' and has written on British national identity, sovereignty, and immigration policy. He has argued that immigration levels should be reduced to "net negative" and has advocated for the reassertion of what he describes as a historically rooted British identity.

Restore Britain, the organisation he co-founded, has been characterised as occupying a far-right political position.
