= Rupert Lowe =

British politician (born 1957)

Rupert Lowe MP
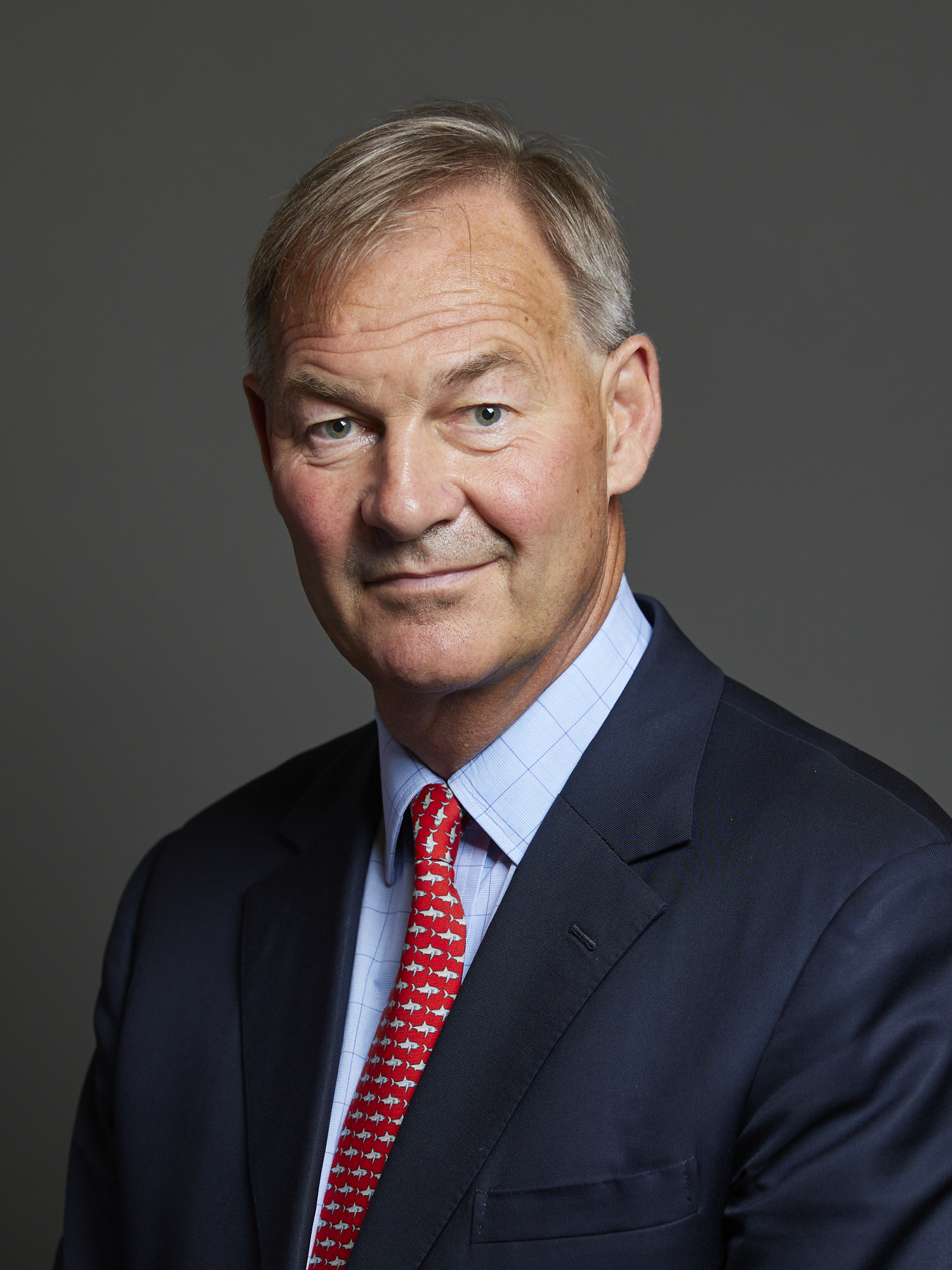
- Official portrait, 2024

Leader of Restore Britain
- Incumbent
- Assumed office 30 June 2025
- Preceded by: Office established

Chairman of Great Yarmouth First
- Incumbent
- Assumed office 1 December 2025
- Leader: Barry Gravenell; Jonathan Wedon (2026)
- Preceded by: Office established

Member of Parliament for Great Yarmouth
- Incumbent
- Assumed office 4 July 2024
- Preceded by: Brandon Lewis
- Majority: 1,426 (3.5%)

Member of the European Parliament for West Midlands
- In office 2 July 2019 – 31 January 2020
- Preceded by: Daniel Dalton
- Succeeded by: Constituency abolished

Personal details
- Born: Rupert James Graham Lowe; 31 October 1957 (age 69) Oxford, Oxfordshire, England
- Party: Restore Britain (since 2026)
- Other political affiliations: Conservative (until 1993); Referendum (1997); Reform UK (2019–2021, 2023–2025); Great Yarmouth First (since 2025)
- Spouse: Nicola Chapman (m. 1986)
- Children: 4
- Education: University of Reading (BSc)
- Website: rupertlowe.co.uk

Rupert James Graham Lowe (born 31 October 1957) is a British politician who is the leader of the ethno-nationalist and far-right party Restore Britain and has been the member of Parliament (MP) for Great Yarmouth since 2024. Elected for Reform UK, he sat as an independent from March 2025 to March 2026 following the suspension of the party whip. Lowe founded the political organisation Restore Britain on 30 June 2025, and registered it as an official political party on 20 March 2026, becoming the party's sole MP on the same day. He was a member of the European Parliament (MEP) for the West Midlands from 2019 to 2020. Lowe has faced political and media scrutiny due to his views on ethnicity and migration, and due to controversies surrounding the membership admissions policies of Restore Britain under his leadership.

Before entering politics, Lowe worked in banking and business and was the chairman of Southampton F.C. from 1996 to 2006 and then from 2008 to 2009, when it entered administration. At the 2019 European Parliament election, Lowe was elected as an MEP for the West Midlands, representing the Brexit Party, which later became Reform UK. He held this role until the UK's withdrawal from the European Union in 2020. Lowe entered the House of Commons at the 2024 general election as MP for Great Yarmouth and was appointed Reform UK's Business and Agriculture Spokesman. In March 2025, he had the whip suspended due to legal accusations, days after criticising Reform UK leader Nigel Farage.

== Early life and education ==
Rupert James Graham Lowe was born on 31 October 1957 in Oxford. He was privately educated at the Dragon School and Radley College, and studied estate management at the University of Reading.

== Career ==
After graduating, Lowe started his career in the City of London for Morgan Grenfell, Deutsche Bank and Barings Bank. He was also a board member of the London International Financial Futures and Options Exchange. He founded Secure Retirements, a quoted care home provider, with Andrew Cowen, later the Southampton F.C. vice-chairman.

=== Southampton F.C. chairmanship ===
In the mid-1990s, the board of Southampton F.C. were looking to float the club on the London Stock Exchange, a long and costly procedure. Therefore, they attempted a reverse takeover as a way to reduce costs. They needed to find a company that had already floated and take it over while effectively being taken over themselves. Lowe's Secure Retirements, which ran nursing homes, was identified as a candidate. The resultant group was renamed Southampton Leisure Holdings. After the deal was completed, Lowe became chairman of the club.

In the summer of 1997, Southampton's manager, Graeme Souness, left after just one season in charge, as did the director of football and former manager Lawrie McMenemy. This came as a shock to the local press, who regarded McMenemy as 'Mr Southampton'; he had previously managed the club from 1973 to 1985, guiding it to FA Cup success in 1976 and finishing second in the league in 1984. Lowe guided the club from their old stadium into the 32,000-seater St Mary's Stadium, which opened in 2001, and the club continued to follow a long-standing policy of selling players for high prices. The players Dean Richards and Kevin Davies were sold to Tottenham Hotspur for £8 million and Blackburn Rovers for £7 million, respectively.

During his ownership of the club, the Saints maintained their Premier League status into the 21st century, despite having been in regular relegation battles since the early 1990s. There were eight managers during his tenure. Dave Jones was put on "gardening leave" in January 2000 amid a criminal investigation, though he was later cleared of all charges. Jones was succeeded by Glenn Hoddle, who left just over a year later to join Tottenham Hotspur. Lowe then appointed Stuart Gray, but Gray was swiftly replaced by Gordon Strachan after a poor start to the 2001–02 season. Strachan guided the Saints to a secure 11th-place finish.

In 2003, Southampton reached the FA Cup Final, and qualified for the UEFA Cup for the first time in nearly 20 years, and also finishing eighth in the league; it was their highest finish for well over a decade. Strachan resigned in February 2004, and Lowe and the board took the decision to replace him with Paul Sturrock before the end of the season. Sturrock himself left the club by mutual consent within six months, despite achieving good results during his time in charge. It was alleged that Lowe attempted to interfere in team selection after consulting the former head coach of the England national rugby union team Clive Woodward, who was being approached about a possible role at the club at the time.

Lowe appointed Harry Redknapp manager of Southampton in December 2004. Redknapp had quit as manager of Southampton's south-coast rivals Portsmouth two weeks earlier. Southampton were relegated in 2005 and Lowe appointed Woodward as Director of Football of Southampton in July 2005. Redknapp resigned as manager in December 2005 and subsequently rejoined Portsmouth. Lowe won a libel case against The Times in 2005, relating to a column by the sportswriter Martin Samuel, who alleged that Lowe had treated Jones "shabbily" following the latter's suspension after he was accused of child abuse charges on which he was ultimately acquitted. Lowe was awarded £250,000, which he pledged to donate to charity.

On 30 June 2006, Lowe resigned under huge pressure from club supporters, including the newly formed Saints Trust, following the club's failure to win promotion back to the Premier League. Michael Wilde, a new investor in Southampton Leisure Holdings, led a new team of directors in taking over the club. The Saints were beaten in the 2006–07 Championship playoffs and narrowly avoided relegation on the final day of the 2007–08 season. In July 2008, Lowe returned as the chairman of Southampton Leisure Holdings. At an annual general meeting (AGM) on 23 December 2008, he received several calls to resign from former chairman Leon Crouch and from fans and shareholders at the meeting. On 2 April 2009, Southampton Leisure Holdings was placed into administration, resulting in Lowe's resignation from the board.

=== Garforth Town ===
In December 2012, Lowe purchased Garforth Town of the Northern Premier League, along with the franchise operation of Socatots & Brazilian Soccer Schools linking up again with Simon Clifford, who had been employed as a Southampton coach in 2005. Lowe left the club in January 2015.

=== Football Association ===
Lowe has served as a member of the executive board of The Football Association as a Premier League representative and as an FA Councillor and on the FA Cup committee.

=== Career before parliament ===
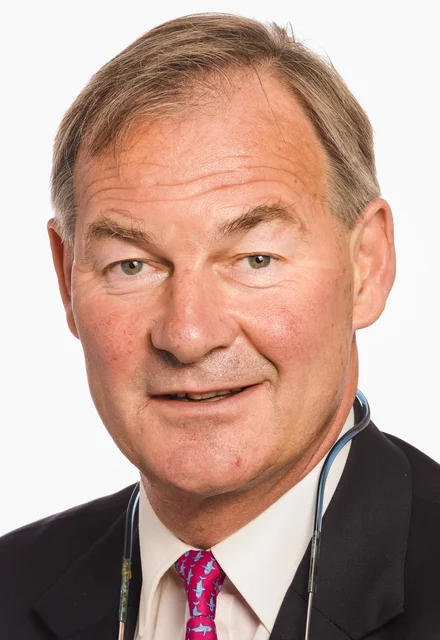
Lowe's official portrait as a Member of the European Parliament, 2019

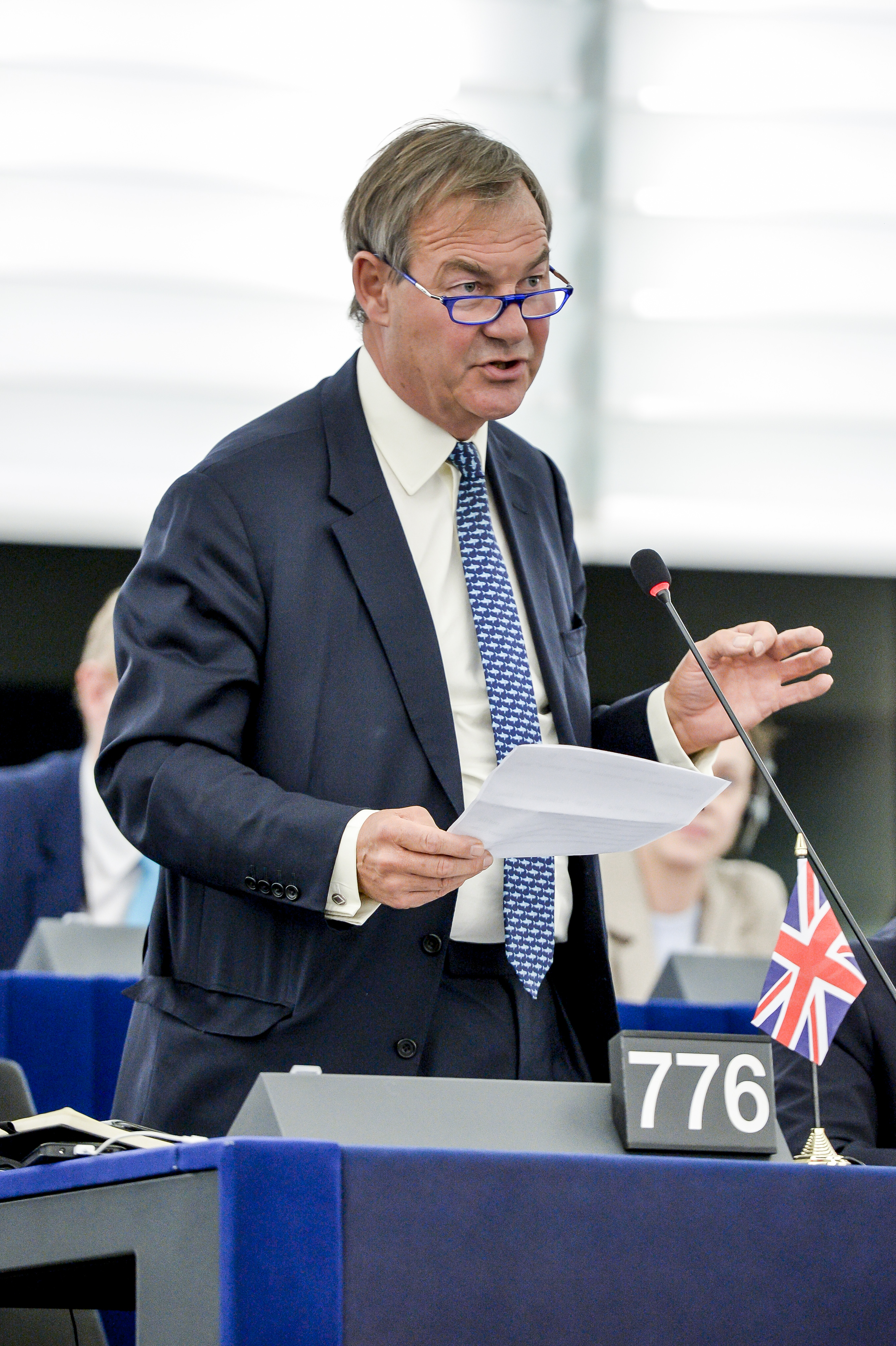
Lowe speaking at a plenary session of the European Parliament in 2019

Lowe was a member of the Conservative Party until 1993, when he left the party after questioning the Maastricht Treaty. He stood for election as the Referendum Party candidate for The Cotswolds at the 1997 general election and came fourth. He won a seat for the Brexit Party in the West Midlands constituency at the 2019 European Parliament election in the United Kingdom. Lowe had planned to be the Brexit Party Prospective Parliamentary Candidate for the Dudley North constituency of the UK Parliament, but he ultimately withdrew. In a January 2020 speech in the European Parliament, he questioned the cause of Australian bushfires: "It's disappointing that climate change has been blamed as the primary cause of these devastating bushfires by both our Parliament and other so-called climate experts. The cult of climate change marches on with no definitive evidence to support or deny the factual accuracy of their assertions."

In March 2023, Lowe returned to politics as Reform UK's Business and Agriculture Spokesman. He contested the 2024 Kingswood by-election, finishing in third place, surpassing 10% and achieving Reform's best-ever by-election result. This was bettered later the same day by Ben Habib's 13% of the vote in the Wellingborough by-election.

=== Member of Parliament ===
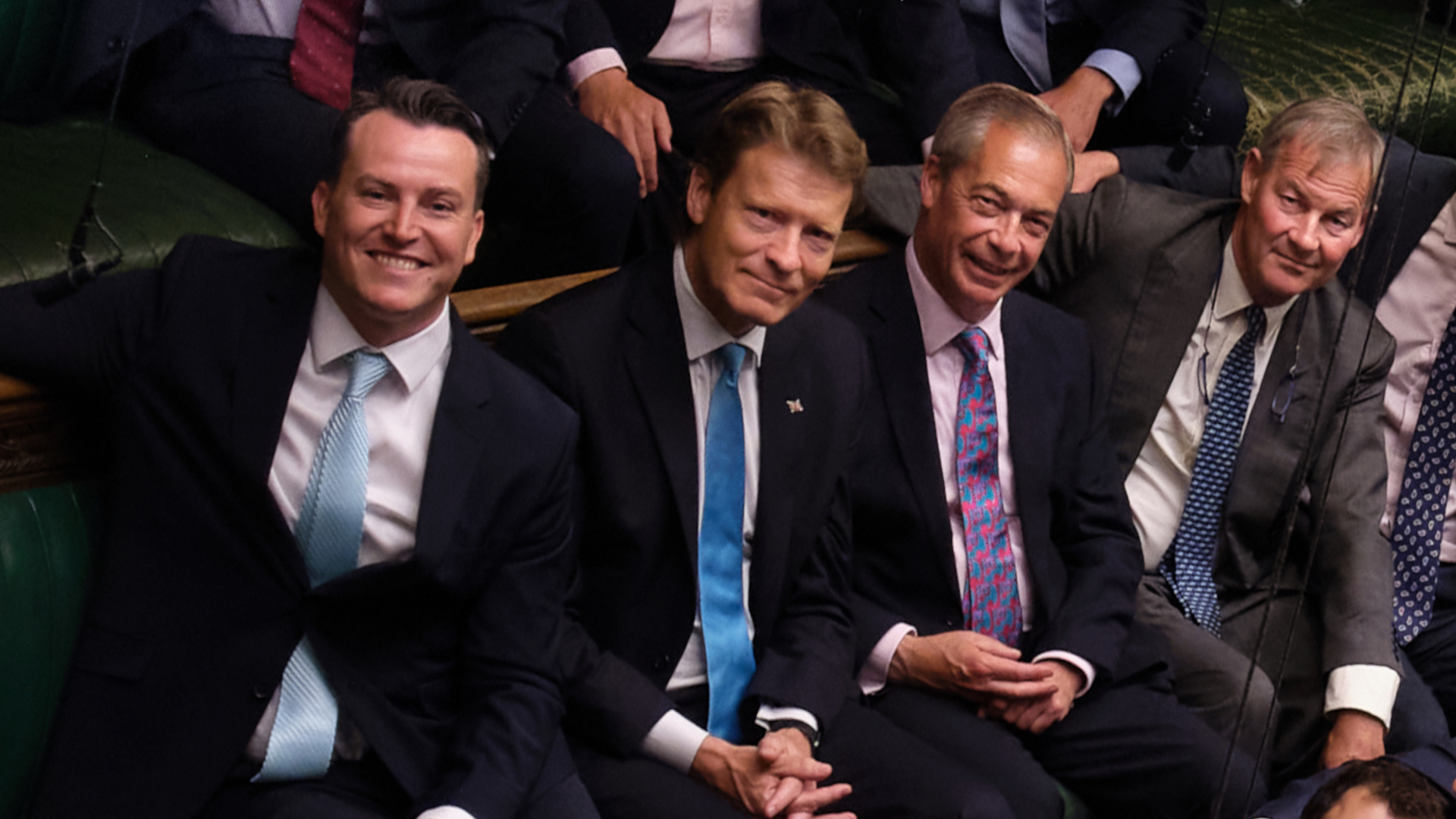
Lowe (right) seated with fellow Reform UK MPs (left to right) James McMurdock, Richard Tice and Nigel Farage in 2024

In the 2024 general election on 4 July, Lowe stood for the Great Yarmouth constituency, and won, gaining 35.3 percent of the vote. After his election, he compiled a list of schools in his constituency where he said that teachers were biased against Reform during the election campaign, saying he would be meeting with headteachers to discuss the allegations. He has also pledged to donate his MP salary to a different local charity or worthy cause each month.

In January 2025, the American businessman Elon Musk, who had endorsed Reform UK, called on Nigel Farage to resign as leader, and then praised Lowe. Lowe thanked Musk, but reiterated his support for Farage. The dispute between Musk and Farage stemmed from Musk's endorsement of political activist Tommy Robinson, whom Farage has rejected; Lowe said Robinson should be acknowledged for "exposing these [child rape] gangs" but called him "not right for Reform".

On 8 January 2025, Lowe brought in a Ten Minute Rule Bill to ban quantitative easing, praising Argentinian president Javier Milei and looking forward to Musk working with American president Donald Trump, before saying "The cost of government should be covered by taxes alone, limiting the growth of excessive statism" which he said was linked to "a general moral decline in society". Also in January 2025, Lowe voted along with other Reform UK MPs to block the Children's Wellbeing and Schools Bill with a motion that called for a new national inquiry into the grooming gangs scandal. The amendment was defeated at 364 votes to 111, a majority of 253 against the amendment.

On 6 March 2025, in an interview with the Daily Mail, Lowe criticised the governance of Reform UK as "a protest party led by the Messiah", suggesting he might leave the party if things did not change, and saying it was too early to tell whether Farage would make a good prime minister. Farage disputed Lowe's criticism of himself and Reform UK, describing his personal following as a good thing, and went on to suggest Lowe's remarks were driven by a desire to be prime minister himself. In the same Daily Mail interview, Lowe stated he thought that MPs' pay should be increased to about £250,000 a year with the size of the House of Commons halved, and described the BBC as a "cancer at the heart of Britain".

In June 2026 he published The Rape Gang Inquiry Report, an unofficial crowd-funded report that alleged that at least 250,000 white girls were subjected to "repeated rape, gang rape, trafficking, torture, pregnancy, forced Islamic conversion and lifelong trauma", while acknowledging imprecision over the figure, stating this is because the numbers were not recorded. It also alleged that the police, social services, schools, the National Health Service, licensing authorities, and governments allowed the gangs to operate "with impunity", and that these crimes have been happening since the 1950s. The report does not support the 250,000 figure with original data, but draws on extant material, including advocacy material (such as that of the evangelical group Christian Concern), and has been criticised as inaccurate and misleading. The Police Service of Northern Ireland stated that "they can find no evidence that suggest any of the findings are true."

=== Bullying allegations and suspension from Reform UK ===
On 7 March 2025, it was announced that Lowe had been reported to the police by Reform UK after its chairman, the businessman Zia Yusuf, alleged Lowe made verbal threats against him three months and a month previously, in December 2024 and in February 2025 respectively, and that he was also under investigation by Reform UK for claims of bullying within his parliamentary office. Reform UK said that Lowe had also refused to cooperate with the investigation, while Lowe himself said that Reform UK's statement was published before an investigation had even begun. Lowe subsequently had the whip suspended by party whip Lee Anderson who said "to remove the whip was a deeply painful thing to do".

Lowe denied all allegations against him and called them vexatious. He also alleged that there were malicious briefings against him by "senior Reform figures" to journalists to claim he had dementia and that both his removal from Reform UK and the investigation into his alleged conduct were in response to his criticisms of Farage as leader of the party. In a statement to the media, Lowe said he had been continually "frozen out of meetings, policy discussions, press conferences and more" for pushing for internal party reform, and accused Farage of putting "a knife in [Lowe's] back over false allegations".

Lowe said that he had disagreed with Farage over the former's endorsement of mass deportations and support for forcibly removing over a million people from the UK if required. Staff members for Lowe have dismissed the bullying allegations as "nonsense". Lowe's entire parliamentary team wrote a public letter in support of him, denying the allegations and stating they have never been contacted as part of any parliamentary investigation. The former deputy leader of Reform UK Ben Habib called Lowe's suspension "an injustice". Habib accused Farage and Yusuf of "trumping up complaints against" Lowe to oust him after Elon Musk suggested Lowe should become Leader of Reform UK instead of Farage. Reform's official X account stopped retweeting Lowe's posts after Musk's comments. Habib called for both men's resignations.

Musk considered backing Lowe if he formed a new party after the row, while multiple senior Conservative figures expressed an interest in Lowe defecting to the Conservative Party instead. On 20 March 2025, BBC News reported on a series of leaked WhatsApp messages between Farage and an unnamed source in which Farage spoke of Lowe as "contemptible" and his anger with Lowe's Daily Mail interview. In the messages, Farage stated that the inquiry into Lowe's alleged behaviour was the right thing to do because the "reputation of the party must be protected", and that he had not allowed a lawyer to complete the investigation before suspending Lowe because he had been "damaging the party just before elections". In response, Lowe told the BBC that the leaked messages proved that the motivation behind his removal was his criticism of Reform UK's party structure, policy and communication and criticism of Farage himself. Lowe concluded by saying Farage "must never be Prime Minister". Farage himself did not comment on the leaks. After a thorough review of the evidence, including multiple witness statements, the Crown Prosecution Service (CPS) announced on 14 May 2025 that there was insufficient evidence to provide a realistic prospect of conviction related to Yusuf's allegations. Prior to the dismissal Lowe's farm was raided during the night by armed police who seized his legal firearms.

In February 2026, Lowe unsuccessfully took action in the High Court to block an investigation into his conduct by the Independent Complaints and Grievance Scheme. The nature of the investigation is not publicly known.

=== Leader of Restore Britain and Great Yarmouth First ===
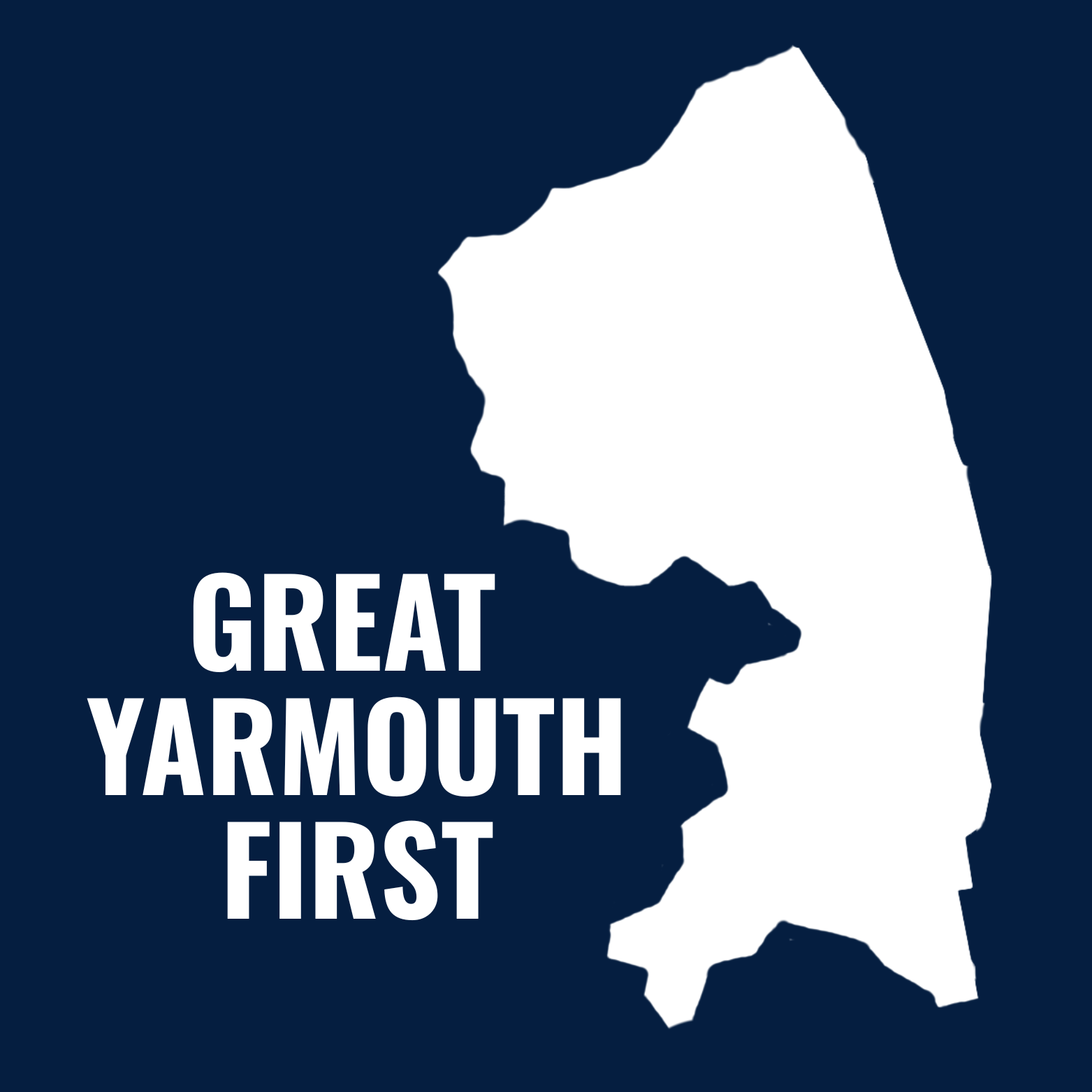
Logo of Great Yarmouth First, Lowe's affiliate of Restore Britain in Great Yarmouth.

On 30 June 2025, Lowe launched the political organisation Restore Britain to advocate the deportation of all illegal immigrants in the United Kingdom, protecting British culture and restoring what it describes as "Christian principles". Susan Hall, the leader of the Conservative Party in the London Assembly, joined the advisory board.

Lowe expressed the view in 2025 that Nigel Farage was "watering down" Reform's policy on the deportation of illegal migrants. Other principles of the Restore Britain organisation revolve around ending diversity programmes and "the cancer of wokery", as well as stating that Parliament is broken and ignores the people. The stated principles of the organisation also include holding local institutions accountable, reducing unemployment by slashing benefits, and cutting taxes.

On 8 August, Lowe posted a picture on X of a small boat off the Norfolk coast, stating: "Dinghies coming into Great Yarmouth, RIGHT NOW. Authorities alerted, and I am urgently chasing. If these are illegal migrants, I will be using every tool at my disposal to ensure these individuals are deported." Great Yarmouth is some 110 miles (175 km) north of Dover, where migrants in small boats usually land, and the same distance from the coast of the Netherlands. It transpired that the boat was a party of volunteers rowing from Land's End to John o' Groats, to raise money for a motor neuron disease charity. While stating that he would "make no apologies over being vigilant", Lowe later stated he would donate £1,000 to the charity. On 21 October, he became a member of the House of Commons Public Accounts Committee.

In December 2025, Lowe launched a new local political party within his constituency, known as Great Yarmouth First. At that time, it was yet to register with the Electoral Commission (EC). On 3 December 2025, Lowe stated 500 people had already joined the party whose year's membership fees have been funded by Lowe. On 13 February 2026, Lowe announced that Restore Britain would officially become a political party.

It was reported on 28 February that Great Yarmouth First had its application to be registered as a political party denied the previous month by the EC because it was "incomplete", forcing the party to apply a second time. The same day Lowe announced five candidates who would contest for seats on Norfolk County Council in the 2026 local elections. On March 4, Great Yarmouth First successfully registered as a political party. Great Yarmouth First contested ten seats in the 2026 local elections, nine seats for Norfolk County Council and one for Great Yarmouth Borough Council. Their candidates won all ten seats.

Mainstream academics and commentators have described Restore Britain as 'ethno-nationalist', 'white nationalist' and 'far-right'. Lowe has been criticised by media outlets and research groups from different political outlooks for allegedly allowing former neo-Nazis to join Restore Britain, and for associating online and in-person with individuals associated with extreme-right political factions. Lowe has said in an interview posted on YouTube that he 'detest[s] far-right ethno nationalist or Neo-Nazism, I've never been driven by that'.

=== Rape Gang Inquiry Report ===
In June 2026, Lowe was involved in the publication of the independently funded Rape Gang Inquiry Report, which examined organised child sexual exploitation in the United Kingdom. The report stated that the gangs it examined predominantly comprised Muslim men of Pakistani heritage and criticised institutional failures in responding to the abuse. The report attracted political and media attention, while its methodology and some of its conclusions, including its estimate of 250,000 victims, were subsequently disputed by Full Fact.

== Views ==
In 2024, Lowe was described in The Guardian as "comfortably in the camp of libertarian conservatives". With the launch of Restore in 2026, The Guardian reported Lowe to be "launching a far-right revolution". In the academic journal Ethnic and Racial Studies and within the context of far-right racism in Europe, Lowe was considered to be one of many competitors "devoted to generating divisive, inflammatory, polarising messages". Sebastian Payne, writing for his column in The Times, described Lowe's views as becoming increasingly radicalised while wanting to "implement the harshest possible circumstances for illegal migrants by abolishing the asylum system". Georgios Samaras, an assistant professor at King's College London, said that Lowe and his party were "the expressions of neo-Nazism in this country", without "being openly, symbolically, and stylistically Nazi".

Lowe has been described by Adam Barnett of DeSmog as spreading climate change denial. He has advocated for the use of solar panels on farms but has commented that "fracking and nuclear are key, and the failure to properly explore those options is a humiliation for the British establishment".

Lowe is an opponent of non-stun slaughter and has campaigned to ban halal and kosher slaughter.

Lowe said in May 2025 that his collection of firearms had been seized by Gloucestershire Police, following a dispute with Reform UK leader Nigel Farage. They were returned to Lowe in August 2025. During a podcast interview with Joe Rogan in July 2026, Lowe, when criticising the ban on handguns in the UK, said that the ban came after "there was a murder in Dunblane". Lowe was referring to the Dunblane massacre in 1996. Rogan asked whether the ban was due to "one murder", and Lowe repeated that was the case. After politicians from other parties called on Lowe to apologise, a Restore Britain spokesperson said Lowe "was clearly referring to one incident". Following the massacre, tighter restrictions on handguns were instituted, which Lowe has criticised as it meant his father had to surrender a number of pistols.

In August 2026, during an interview with Nick Robinson on BBC Radio 4's Today programme, Lowe was challenged on the claim that to be a 'white Briton' both a person's parents must be born in Britain. Robinson asked whether that meant Charles III, whose father was born on Corfu, Greece, was not white British. Lowe responded by saying "many people have different interpretations of that". Lowe was quoting a report written by Reform UK spokesman and ex-academic Matt Goodwin, which states white British people will be a minority in the UK by 2063 and defined being 'British' as having two British parents.

== Personal life ==
Lowe married Nicola Chapman in 1986 and they have four children. Lowe is a multimillionaire. He owns Ravenswell Farm in Withington, Gloucestershire. The operations of the racehorse trainer Fergal O'Brien are based at the farm. In February 2018, Lowe was one of several people who received undisclosed damages payouts from Mirror Group Newspapers as part of the News International phone hacking scandal.

Parliament of the United Kingdom
Preceded by Brandon Lewis	Member of Parliament for Great Yarmouth; 2024–present	Incumbent
