= Shirehall, Norwich =

County building in Norwich, Norfolk, England

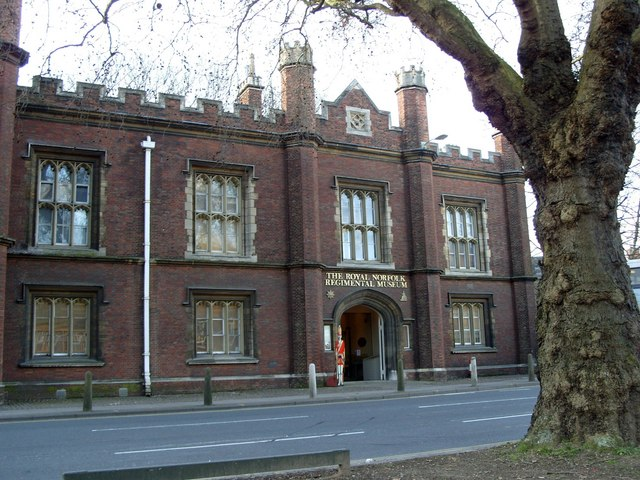
- The Shirehall in 2008

- Location within Norfolk
- 52.6286°N 1.2974°E
- Location: Norwich, Norfolk

History
- Built: 1823

Site notes
- Architect: William Wilkins
- Architectural style: Tudor Revival style

Listed Building – Grade II
- Designated: 5 June 1972
- Reference no.: 1372844

The Shirehall is a municipal facility in Market Avenue, Norwich, Norfolk. It is a Grade II listed building.

== History ==
An early Shirehall was built atop the Norwich Castle mound in around 1270 and rebuilt during the Elizabethan era. The current Shirehall, which was designed by William Wilkins in the Tudor Revival style, was completed in 1823. The design involved a symmetrical castellated main frontage with nine bays facing onto the Market Avenue; the central section, which projected slightly forward, featured an arched doorway, a triple window on the first floor and a shield above the window; there were polygon-shaped turrets at roof level.

Important cases at the Shirehall included the trial and conviction of James Bloomfield Rush for the murders of Isaac Jermy and his son, Isaac Jermy Jermy, at Stanfield Hall in April 1849.

The building continued to be used as a facility for dispensing justice but, following the implementation of the Local Government Act 1888, which established county councils in every county, it also became the meeting place of Norfolk County Council. An extension to the Shirehall, to the south of the main building and known as Shirehall Chambers, was built using Bath stone and opened in 1909. The education department, and some other departments, moved to new premises at Thorpe Road in Norwich in 1929. After the county council moved to County Hall in 1968, the building continued to be used as a Crown Court until the new Courts Complex in Bishopgate was completed in 1988.

The building became the Regimental Museum of the Royal Norfolk Regiment in 1990. Although archives and the reserve collections continued to be held in the Shirehall, the principal museum display there closed in September 2011, and relocated to the main Norwich Castle Museum, reopening fully in 2013. Meanwhile, the courtroom in the Shirehall was refurbished and re-opened to the public in September 2013.

The Norwich Castle Study Centre, which now occupies the Shirehall, contains a number of important collections, including an extensive collection of more than 20,000 costume and textile items, built up over a period of some 130 years, and previously kept in other Norwich museums. Although not a publicly open museum in the usual sense, items in the collections are accessible to the general public, students, researchers and others by prior appointment.
