= County Hall, Norwich =

County building in Norwich, Norfolk, England

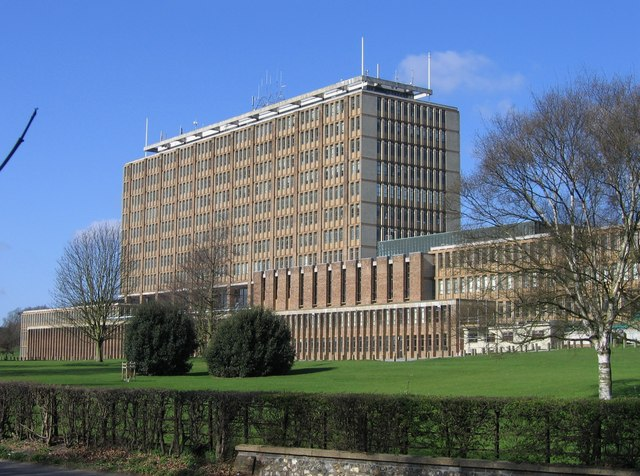
- County Hall

- Location within Norfolk

General information
- Architectural style: Modern style
- Location: Martineau Lane, Norwich, Norfolk, United Kingdom
- Coordinates: 52.6150°N 1.3073°E
- Completed: 1968

Design and construction
- Architect: Reginald Uren

County Hall is a municipal facility at Martineau Lane in Norwich, Norfolk. It is the headquarters of Norfolk County Council.

== History ==
For much of the 20th century meetings of Norfolk County Council had taken place in the Shirehall in Market Avenue. The education department, and some other departments, had moved to new premises at Thorpe Road in Norwich in 1929.

After deciding that the existing premises were inadequate for their needs, county leaders decided to procure a new building: the site they selected had been occupied by Bracondale Lodge, a country house which had been commissioned by Dr Philip Meadows Martineau, a clinician at Norfolk and Norwich Hospital, in 1793. Bracondale Lodge had been acquired by Jeremiah Colman MP in 1877 and had remained in the ownership of the Colman family until it was demolished to make way for County Hall in 1966.

The new building was designed by Reginald Uren in the Modern style, built at a cost of £2.5 million and was officially opened by Queen Elizabeth II on 24 May 1968. The design involved for the 10-storey tower (it had a two-storey podium and eight storeys above) involved continuous bands of glazing with Hathernware faience tiles above and below. There were also low-rise blocks to the south west and north east of the tower access to which was from a roundabout on Martineau Lane. In the 1980s an emergency control centre was established in the basement in case of a nuclear attack. Internally, the principal rooms were the council chamber and committee rooms. The Norfolk Police headquarters was accommodated within the building.

When RAF Coltishall closed in November 2006 a SEPECAT Jaguar, which had acted as a gate guardian at the RAF station, was moved to County Hall and installed to the west of the main building.

In August 2013, following an application from the county council, English Heritage decided not to list County Hall as the building did not meet the criteria for listing post-1945 buildings. A major refurbishment of the building was carried out at a cost of circa £60 million between 2013 and 2019.
