= Restore Britain =

Far-right political party in the United Kingdom

- Leader: Rupert Lowe
- Spokesperson: Charlie Downes
- Founder: Rupert Lowe
- Founded: 30 June 2025; 16 months ago (as pressure group); 13 February 2026; 9 months ago (as political party)
- Split from: Reform UK
- Headquarters: Millennium House; Gapton Hall Road, Great Yarmouth; NR31 0NL
- Membership (June 2026): 130,000
- Ideology: Ethnic nationalism Anti-immigration
- Political position: Far-right
- Local affiliations: Great Yarmouth First
- Colours: Navy blue
- House of Commons: 1 / 650
- House of Lords: 0 / 796
- Scottish Parliament: 0 / 129
- Senedd: 0 / 96
- Councillors (Note: In Norfolk, councillors sit as members of the party's local affiliate, Great Yarmouth First.): 38 / 18,645

Website
- www.restorebritain.org.uk

Restore Britain is an ethno-nationalist and far-right political party in the United Kingdom led by Rupert Lowe, the member of Parliament for Great Yarmouth. The organisation was officially launched as a pressure group on 30 June 2025 and became a political party on 13 February 2026. It presents itself as an umbrella organisation for local grassroots groups and has been labelled as further to the right than Reform UK on the political spectrum.

Lowe was elected to Parliament for Reform UK but formally left the party after public disputes with its leadership and criticism of Nigel Farage. Reform UK subsequently alleged threatening behaviour from Lowe as a reason for his suspension, which Lowe and his staff denied. In 2025, he established Restore Britain as a pressure group, with an initial advisory board that included Conservative politicians such as Susan Hall and Gavin Williamson. The party also raised funds via crowdfunding for an inquiry into the grooming gangs scandal.

The party advocates for the large-scale deportation of people in the United Kingdom without legal status, including having net-negative immigration. The party wants to hold a referendum on reinstating the death penalty, to withdraw public funding for the BBC, to ban the burqa and niqab, to legalise the possession of pepper spray, and to expand the legal scope of "reasonable force" in defence of the home. It has also referred to stopping "wokery" and banning kosher and halal slaughter.

In April 2026, The Times reported that neo-fascist leaders had backed the party. According to Hope Not Hate, the party has gained support from British neo-Nazis, including the leadership of Patriotic Alternative, as well as former officials of the British Democratic Party, the British National Party, and For Britain. Sky News reported self-identified white nationalists and ethno-nationalists had become official party organisers. Lowe has expressed indifference to Restore Britain being described as far-right or racist and disputed that the party is racist or bigoted.

== Background ==
Rupert Lowe was elected as one of Reform's five members of Parliament at the 2024 general election, representing the constituency of Great Yarmouth. On 7 March 2025, Reform suspended him and removed the party whip following allegations that he had made threats of violence towards party chairman Zia Yusuf, as well as other alleged incidents of bullying and threatening behaviour between December 2024 and February 2025.

The party also cited complaints from staff about derogatory and discriminatory remarks about women and reported the matter to the police, after which the Metropolitan Police passed a file to prosecutors. Lowe and his seven parliamentary staff denied the allegations in an open letter, calling them false and vexatious, and noted that his suspension and police referral came the day after he had publicly raised concerns and criticised party leader Nigel Farage in a media interview. On 9 March 2025, Lowe said he believed Farage was "watering down" Reform's policy on the deportation of illegal migrants.

On 25 March 2025, leaked WhatsApp messages showed Farage calling Lowe's behaviour "disgusting" and "contemptible"; Lowe responded by calling the process a "malicious witch hunt" against him and alleging that it was motivated by his decision to ask questions and challenge the party leadership.

== History ==
=== Launch ===
On 30 June 2025, Lowe launched Restore as a political organisation "for those who believe that we need to fundamentally change the way Britain is governed." The launch coincided with that of Advance UK, a far-right party founded by another former Reform UK representative Ben Habib. Susan Hall, then leader of the Conservative Party group on the London Assembly, joined Restore's advisory board. Lowe raised approximately £600,000 through crowdfunding for an independent inquiry into child sexual exploitation by grooming gangs to be sponsored by Restore Britain. This initiative attracted the involvement of Conservative MPs Nick Timothy, Esther McVey, and Gavin Williamson.

On 13 February 2026, Lowe announced that Restore would become a registered political party, presenting it as an umbrella organisation for local grassroots groups. Following the announcement, Hall and Williamson left the organisation.

On 20 March 2026, Lowe said that the party had been registered with the Electoral Commission to run candidates in Great Britain. Lowe officially joined Restore as a member of the House of Commons on 23 March 2026.

=== Emergence ===
On 15 February 2026, Restore announced its first local councillor, Maria Bowtell, who had previously served as a Reform, then independent, councillor on the East Riding of Yorkshire Council. Habib stated that he would consider a possible merger between Advance UK and Restore. On 17 February, Restore announced that eight additional councillors had joined the party, including seven from Kent County Council, on which Restore became the third-largest party. Lowe said that further defections were expected.

On 19 February, Lowe announced that three more councillors had defected from Reform: one from Leicestershire County Council and two from Warwickshire County Council. The following day, two councillors in North Northamptonshire Council also defected to Restore, though one (Darren Rance) subsequently said he was rejoining Reform. The defectors initially sat as independents since Restore was not yet recognised by the Electoral Commission.

Hope not Hate later credited the party for the timing of the launch, due to the "growing appetite for ethnonationalism on the right and the mainstreaming of remigration narratives", describing the party as having "instantly filled the gap to the right of Reform that UKIP, Britain First and a dozen microparties have been clawing to occupy for years".

The Financial Times reported that the social media website X has been "instrumental in helping the party gain reach", with Lowe and the party having a combined reach of over one million followers as of May 2026. X owner Elon Musk has also endorsed the party and amplified its rhetoric.

=== Supporters ===
According to Hope not Hate, by mid-February 2026, ethnonationalists had joined the party, with support from British neo-Nazis including the leadership of Patriotic Alternative. The support base was described as straddling the divide on the far-right between civic nationalists on one side, and ethnic nationalists on the other. In April, the advocacy group further reported that a "tidal wave of fascists, neo-Nazis and other extremists" had declared their support, including former officials of the British Democratic Party, the British National Party, and For Britain.

Britain First agreed to defer to Restore in order to avoid fielding candidates in the same areas. The Week described a decentralised network, "effectively serving as an umbrella for local far-right political partners"; former leader of the English Defence League, Tommy Robinson, has backed Restore, along with former Reform deputy leader Ben Habib.

In April, The Times reported that "prominent neo-fascist leaders" had backed the party in an attempt to prevent electoral victory for Farage. Simon Birkett, leader of The Woodlander Initiative and former official of the fascist British National Party, described Restore as the last hope for the far-right to achieve political power, stating that there was a "a world of difference" between the party and Reform UK.

Steve Laws, an influential ethnonationalist and self-proclaimed "proud" racist, urged his supporters to become candidates and organisers for Restore Britain, in order to "create a stronghold in that party". According to Laws, he is in regular contact with the team, who can be trusted due to being "well to the right" of other far-right parties including Britain First, the British Democratic Party, and the Homeland Party. In response, Lowe and the party described the report as a "pathetic smear campaign". Laws echoed the sentiment of a smear campaign. Far-right supporters of Restore have also criticised Reform for "not for being too far to the right, but for not being rightwing enough", according to the Financial Times.

In November, Sky News, in analysing the rise of party, documented several self-identified white nationalists and ethno-nationalists that have been involved in building the party, as well as becoming official party organisers. Lowe stated that he "reject[s] the proposition that Britshness is exclusively racial".

== Platform and ideology ==
Restore is openly ethno-nationalist and classified as far-right. It is considered to be to the right of Reform UK, as part of the radical right. Lowe has stated indifference to Restore being described as far-right or racist, has disputed the criticism of the party being "racist or bigoted", and has proclaimed that the party "will look at the facts, and then discriminate."

In February 2026, LBC characterised the party's policies as "strongly nationalist and socially conservative, even far-right". The Times described Lowe's views as becoming increasingly radicalised while wanting to "implement the harshest possible circumstances for illegal migrants". The Critic reported that the party was "positioning itself further right than Reform" and suggested that voters with extreme beliefs may see Restore as the party most in line with their views. Hope not Hate categorised Restore as "part of a broader re-racialisation of the British far right" with openly racial politics, while assembling a coalition of figures located "to the right of Reform, all the way through to open fascists". According to Restore spokesman Charlie Downes, Britishness is defined by "indigenous British ancestry and Christian faith".

In May 2026, The Financial Times referred to the party as "seeking to outdo Farage in anti-immigrant rhetoric" and as a result "embracing a form of hardline nativism that has rarely been seen in British politics since the de facto disappearance of the British National Party". The Week opined that "Lowe's party has sought to present itself as the true voice of the right", while sharing many similar policies with Reform. Political scientist Tim Bale theorised that "the party's impact will be determined in large part by how Farage reacts", based on the benefit for Farage to distinguish himself from more extreme elements than himself, and suggest he's not far right. The i Paper characterised the party as "a genuine threat" to Farage and "a challenge to mainstream politics".

In June, Al Jazeera opined that the party was "arguably even more anti-immigration than Farage himself", and that according to observers, former Reform supporters had deserted the party in large numbers in favour of Restore. Georgios Samaras, an assistant professor at King's College London, stated that "[Restore] know that a percentage of Reform is openly fascist, and they are trying to attract that audience." His view was that "Rupert Lowe and Restore Britain are the expressions of neo-Nazism in this country", without "being openly, symbolically, and stylistically Nazi".

According to its published materials and public statements, Restore supports policies including the deportation of people residing in the United Kingdom without legal status, seeking net-negative immigration. Lowe released a 133-page "mass deportation" policy document for Restore Britain, crediting a range of figures such as Carl Benjamin and contributors to GB News. Alongside its immigration policies, the party's manifesto includes "put[ting] British interests first", halting foreign aid when it does not benefit national interest, ending DEI in the British Armed Forces, and expanding the powers of stop and search. Its economic polices include rebuilding industries, infrastructure, and repealing net-zero policies. Concerned over the perceived trajectory of Native British births by percentage, the party echoes the Great Replacement conspiracy theory, a conspiracy that claims that non-native citizens will eventually outnumber native citizens. The party has alleged that this will occur by 2070.

The party has also pledged legalising the possession of pepper spray for women and the use of "reasonable force" in the defence of people's homes, and has referred in its rhetoric to a desire to "carpet-bomb the cancer of wokery". It has additionally stated that it seeks to abolish kosher and halal slaughter and to restore Christian principles. Other policies include reinstating the death penalty, reducing certain taxes, limiting the size of government, banning the burqa and niqab, and reducing or withdrawing public funding from the BBC.

In response to the September 2026 Cardiff Agreement, Lowe announced Restore Britain's policy of "rolling back" devolution in Northern Ireland, Scotland and Wales, to "restore democratic accountability and strengthen the Union." He stated that the party was "developing" a policy paper on the matter.

== Polling ==
Findoutnow conducted a poll of 3,029 adults in late February 2026 that found 7% of participants would support Restore in a general election. In March 2026, Findoutnow found Restore at 8% with Reform at 25%, and in April 2026, it went to 9% for Restore and 21% for Reform.

According to a 14 April 2026 poll by YouGov, Restore maintained 4% in Westminster, with Reform at 24%.

== Elections ==
Great Yarmouth First, Restore's local affiliate party in the Borough of Great Yarmouth, contested ten seats in the 2026 local elections, nine seats for Norfolk County Council and one for Great Yarmouth Borough Council. Their candidates won all ten seats.

On 18 May 2026, local businesswoman Rebecca Shepherd was confirmed to be the candidate of Restore Britain for the 2026 Makerfield by-election. The election marked the first time Restore Britain stood a candidate for Westminster. The party received 3,111 votes (6.84% of the total), coming 3rd out of 14 candidates, behind the Labour Party and Reform UK.

On 22 May, Marlon West was announced as Restore Britain's candidate for the 2026 Greater Manchester mayoral by-election. Restore came 4th out of 7 candidates, achieving 46,289 votes and 8.7% of the total.

In the Holborn and St Pancras by-election held on 8 October, the party's candidate Tyler Johnson received 692 votes (2.5%), finishing 6th out of 15 candidates.

== Leader of Restore Britain ==
Leader of Restore Britain
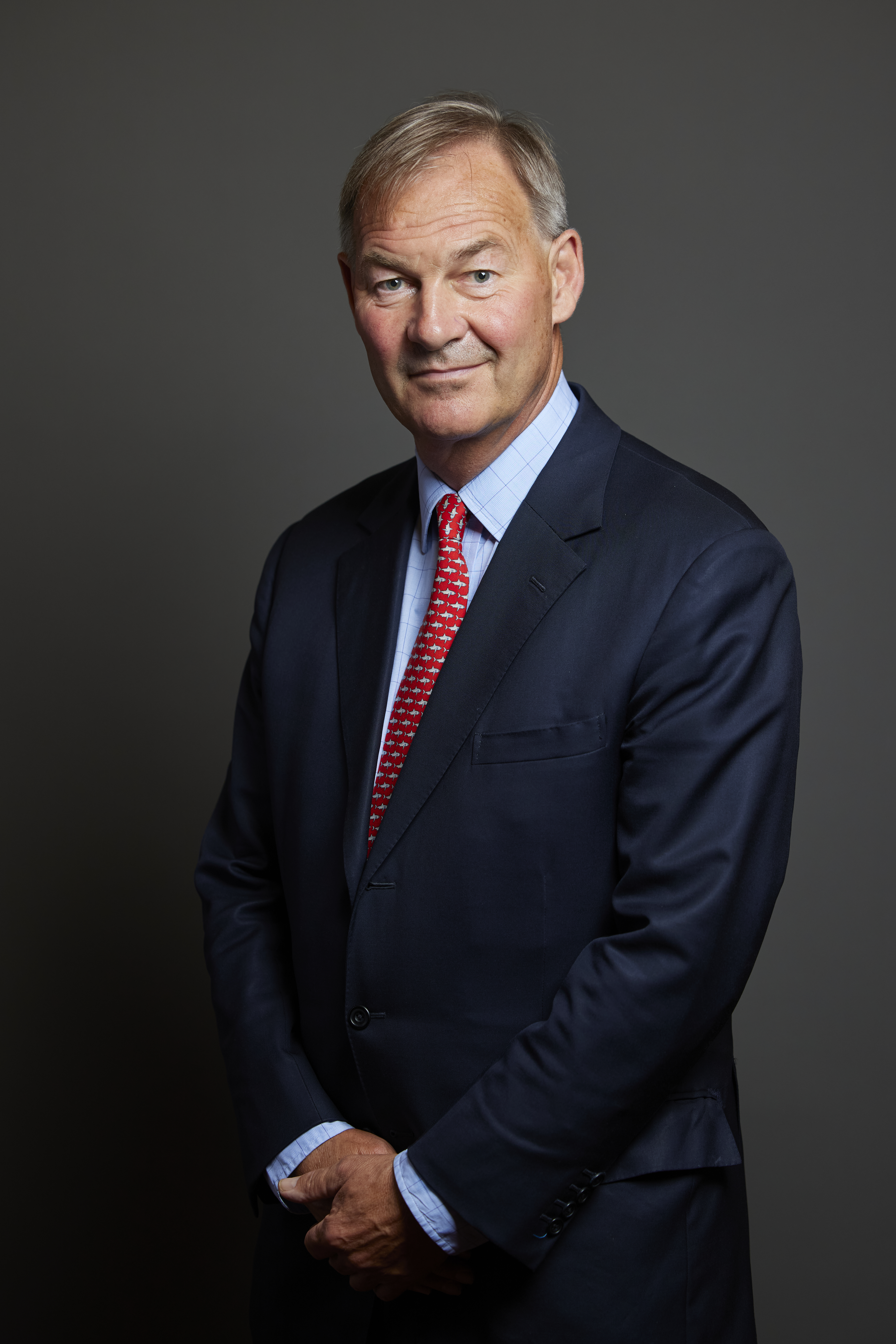
- Incumbent; Rupert Lowe since 30 June 2025
- Style: Party leader
- Formation: 30 June 2025 (as pressure group leader); 13 February 2026 (as political party leader)
- First holder: Rupert Lowe

The current leader of Restore Britain is party founder Rupert Lowe, who assumed the role on 30 June 2025 when the party was formed. Lowe had criticised Reform UK leader Nigel Farage and the rest of Reform UK's leadership, which led to his departure from Reform UK in March 2025. On 13 February 2026 Restore Britain became a political party.

== Membership ==
On 16 February 2026, a few days after Restore announced its launch as a political party, the organisation stated that it had reached 50,000 members. Two days later, Lowe said that membership had risen to 70,000. On 5 June 2026, the party had more than 96,000 members. By 16 June 2026, the party had 130,000 paying members.

=== Elected representatives ===
Restore's local affiliate, Great Yarmouth First, won ten council seats at the 2026 local elections. The party is currently represented in the House of Commons by a single MP, Rupert Lowe. A number of local councillors elected under other descriptions have joined the party.

==== House of Commons ====
As of 23 March 2026

Portrait	Member	Constituency
	Rupert Lowe (Note: Officially registered as Restore Britain in the House of Commons on 23 March 2026.)	Great Yarmouth

==== Councillors ====
As of 10 August 2026

Council	Councillors
East Riding of Yorkshire	1 / 67
Hertfordshire	1 / 78
Kent	7 / 81
Leicestershire	1 / 55
Norfolk	9 / 84
North Northamptonshire	1 / 68
Warwickshire	4 / 57
Swale	1 / 47
Vale of Glamorgan	1 / 54
Cornwall	2 / 87
York	1 / 47
Argyll and Bute	1 / 36
Bridgend	1 / 51
Burnley	1 / 45
Great Yarmouth	1 / 39
West Northamptonshire	2 / 76
Plymouth	2 / 57
