= Jon Wedon =

English politician (born 1980)

Councillor Jon Wedon
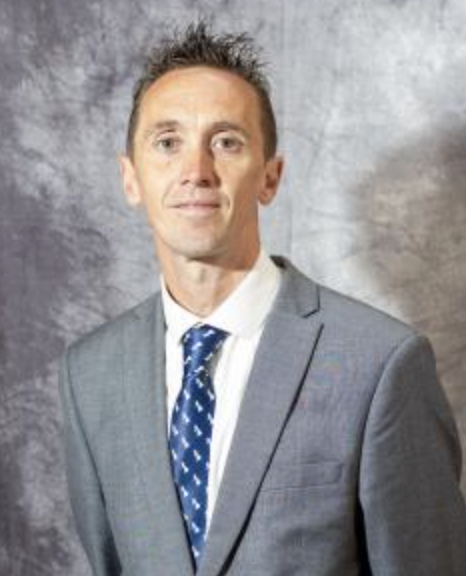
- Official portrait, 2026

Leader of Great Yarmouth First
- In office 3 March 2026 – 9 October 2026
- Deputy: Barry Gravenell
- Chairman: Rupert Lowe
- Preceded by: Position established
- Succeeded by: Barry Gravenell

Member of Norfolk County Council
- Incumbent
- Assumed office 7 May 2026
- Division: Lothingland
- Preceded by: Carl Annison

Member of Great Yarmouth Borough Council
- Incumbent
- Assumed office 7 May 2026
- Ward: Caister South
- Preceded by: Malcom Bird

Personal details
- Born: April 1980 (age 46) England
- Party: Independent
- Other political affiliations: Great Yarmouth First (2026); Restore Britain (Note: Great Yarmouth First shares its memberships with Restore Britain.) (2026)
- Police career
- Service: Norfolk Constabulary
- Rank: Special Constable

Jonathan Mark Wedon (born April 1980) is an English politician who served as leader of Great Yarmouth First from March 2026 to October 2026, and as a member of both Norfolk County Council and Great Yarmouth Borough Council.

== Early life and career ==
Wedon was born in April 1980, and is a lifelong resident of Great Yarmouth. Prior to entering politics, he worked at the Joyland amusement park, later serving as a Special Constable in the Norfolk Constabulary and worked for 20 years in the Department for Work and Pensions.

== Political career ==
In 2024 Wedon began working for Rupert Lowe in Great Yarmouth, running his constituency office. He would later become leader of Great Yarmouth First following its registration with the Electoral Commission on 3 March 2026.

In England's 2026 local elections Wedon stood for Lothingland division on Norfolk County Council and Caister South ward for Great Yarmouth Borough Council, winning both seats by a significant margin, with all other GYF candidates standing also winning their seats, giving them 9 total representatives on the County Council. He subsequently said "we will give Great Yarmouth the loudest voice it has ever heard". He was selected as leader of the GYF group on Norfolk County Council. He has criticised plans to build houses between Hopton and Gorleston.

Wedon ran on policies that included stopping the "proposed housing development on Links Road", citing that "Infrastructure must come first on all housebuilding projects". He also campaigned on improving streetlighting among the A143.
