= Great Yarmouth First =

Local political party in England

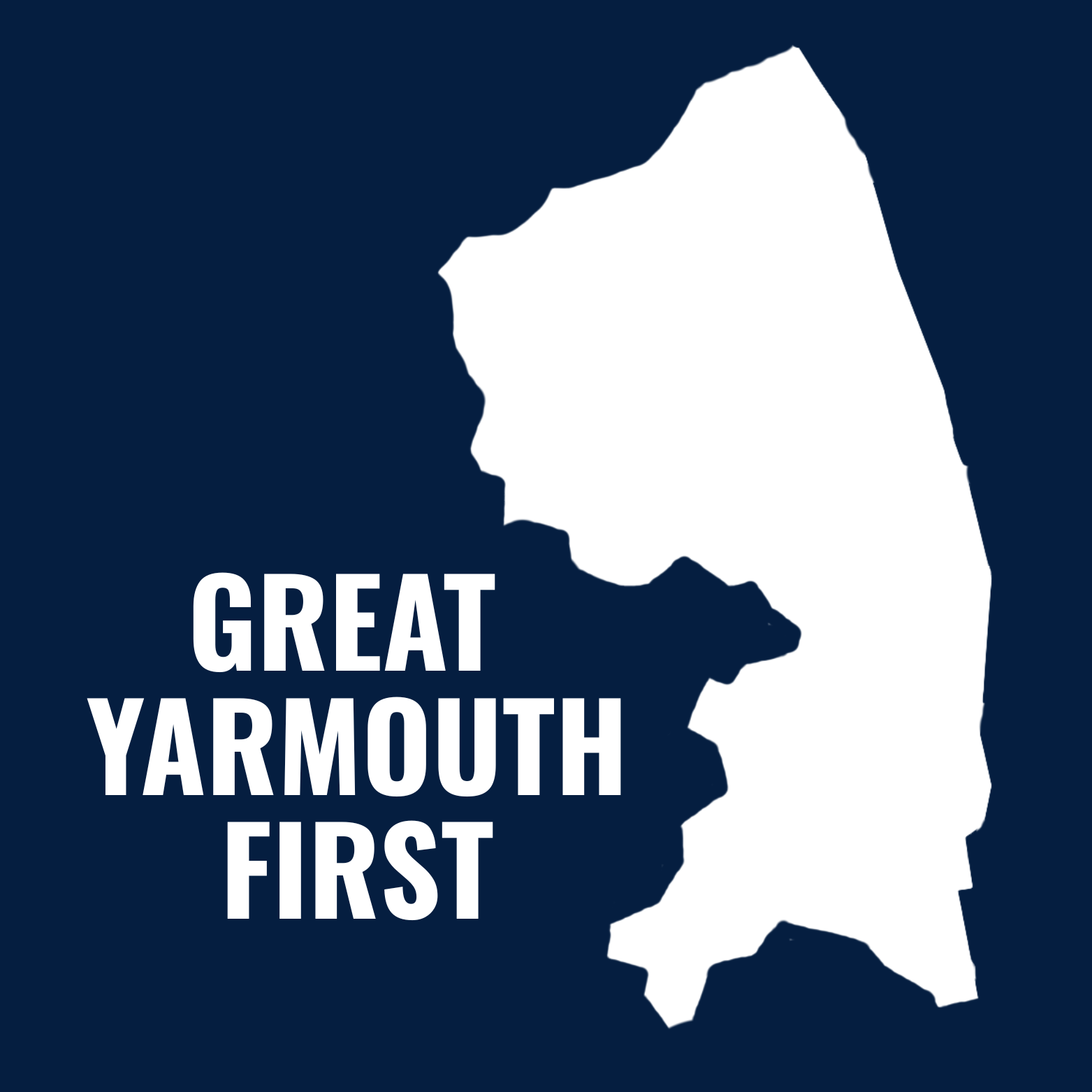
- Leader: Barry Gravenell
- Chairman: Rupert Lowe
- Founder: Rupert Lowe
- Founded: 2025
- Headquarters: Millennium House; Gapton Hall Road, Great Yarmouth; NR31 0NL
- Political position: Far-right
- National affiliation: Restore Britain
- Colours: Navy blue
- Norfolk County Council: 8 / 84
- Great Yarmouth Borough Council: 1 / 39

Website
- www.greatyarmouthfirst.co.uk

Great Yarmouth First (GYF) is a far-right localist political party in Great Yarmouth, Norfolk. It was founded by the constituency's Member of Parliament, Rupert Lowe, in December 2025, and was registered as a political party in early 2026. Barry Gravenell has served as the party leader since October 2026, succeeding Jon Wedon. It is a local affiliate party of Restore Britain.

== History ==
In December 2025, MP Rupert Lowe launched a new local political party within his constituency, known as Great Yarmouth First. At that time, it was yet to register with the Electoral Commission (EC). On 3 December 2025, Lowe stated 500 people had already joined the party whose year's membership fees have been funded by Lowe. At the time Lowe was emerging from a public feud with the leadership of Reform UK arguing for mass deportations and for allegedly bullying Zia Yusuf resulting in a police investigation and him being suspended by the party's whip. In February 2026 The Guardian described the party as far-right, and noted the public support of "ethnonationalist" Steve Laws.

On 28 February, it was reported that GYF had its application to be registered as a political party denied the previous month by the EC because it was "incomplete" forcing the party to apply a second time. The same day Lowe announced five candidates who would contest for seats on Norfolk County Council in the 2026 local elections. On 4 March, GYF successfully registered as a political party. As Lowe became more involved in organising his national Restore Britain party he transferred leadership of GYF to Jon Wedon; his MP's constituency office manager who became GYF's director.

=== Entry to elected office (2026) ===
GYF contested ten seats in the 2026 local elections, nine seats for Norfolk County Council and one for Great Yarmouth Borough Council. Their candidates won all ten seats by significant margins.

GYF's sweep of Great Yarmouth spoiled Reform UK's efforts to win outright control of the Norfolk County Council, winning 40 seats but needing 43 for a majority, coming in second place in eight constituencies GYF won. Wedon, who was elected as councillor for Lothingland and to the Great Yarmouth Borough, stated in his victory speech that "we will give Great Yarmouth the loudest voice it has ever heard round that county council table and we will really start to make no apologies for the positive vision we want to take forward for Great Yarmouth". and said GYF has not ruled out working with Reform, stating "Rupert has been open about how he will work with anybody if it benefits the good people of Great Yarmouth".

The party abstained from the vote to name Reform's David Bick the leader of Norfolk council, allowing his nomination to go through. Bick would go on to say that GYF and Reform were "very much on the same page" in terms of policy and that GYF "have demonstrated a lot of collaboration and common sense" while still denying that any formal cooperation agreement between the two parties was reached. On 22 September 2026, Great Yarmouth First reached an agreement with Reform to cancel £1.6m in funding for all translation services not into the English Language across the county with the sole exemption for British Sign Language. Shortly after on 26 September senior Tory councillor and deputy mayor of Hemsby, James Bensly, defected to GYF.

=== Elected Councillors ===
Norfolk County Council
Name	Division	Election Date	Date Left
Jonathan Wedon	Lothingland	7 May 2026	9 October 2026
Barry Gravenell	Gorleston	7 May 2026	NA
Michael French	Breydon	7 May 2026	NA
Callum Ward-Kendall	Yarmouth Nelson & Southtown	7 May 2026	NA
Steve Grimmer	Yarmouth North & Central	7 May 2026	NA
Daniel McGrath	South Caister & Bure	7 May 2026	NA
Glenn Hurren	North Caister & Ormesby	7 May 2026	NA
Jason Hughes	The Fleggs	7 May 2026	NA
Kevin Huggins	Magdalen	7 May 2026	NA

Great Yarmouth Borough Council
Name	Ward	First Elected	Date Joined	Date Left
Jonathan Wedon	Caister South	7 May 2026	NA	9 October 2026
James Bensly	East Flegg	5 May 2016	26 September 2026	NA

== Views ==
GYF claims to represent voters who feel "apoplectic towards politics" and for those who "feel underrepresented, they don't feel that maybe the current politicians represent their views and issues" while also claiming a "Rupert Lowe factor" towards their popularity. The party is anti-immigration. Norfolk's Council leader David Bick has stated that GYF supports Reform's positions of reviewing all spending relating to net-zero efforts.
