= Norfolk County Council =

Local government for Norfolk, England

Leadership
- Chair: Julian Kirk, Reform UK since 28 May 2026
- Leader: David Bick, Reform UK since 28 May 2026
- Chief Executive: Dennis Bacon since August 2026

Structure
- Seats: 84 councillors
- Political groups: All parties (84) Reform (38) Liberal Democrats (13) Green (12) Great Yarmouth First (8) Conservative (9) Labour (1) Independent (3)
- Length of term: 4 years

Elections
- Voting system: First-past-the-post
- Last election: 7 May 2026
- Next election: 2029

Meeting place
- County Hall, Martineau Lane, Norwich

Website
- norfolk.gov.uk

Norfolk County Council is the upper-tier local authority for Norfolk, England. Below it there are seven second-tier district councils: Breckland, Broadland, Great Yarmouth, North Norfolk, Norwich, King's Lynn and West Norfolk, and South Norfolk.

The council has been under no overall control since the 2026 election. It is based at County Hall, Norwich.

== History ==
Elected county councils were created in 1889 under the Local Government Act 1888, taking over many administrative functions that had previously been performed by unelected magistrates at the quarter sessions. The boroughs of Norwich and Great Yarmouth were both considered large enough to provide their own county-level services, so they became county boroughs, independent from the county council. The county council was elected by and provided services to the remainder of the county outside those two boroughs, which area was termed the administrative county.

The first elections were held in January 1889, and the council formally came into being on 1 April 1889. The council held its first official meeting on 13 April 1889 at the Shirehall in Norwich, the courthouse which had been the meeting place of the quarter sessions which preceded the county council. The first chairman was Robert Gurdon, who was the Member of Parliament for the Mid Norfolk constituency and a member of the Liberal Unionist Party. In 1902 it was said that the council consisted "almost entirely of landowners and large farmers."

Local government in the United Kingdom was reformed in 1974 under the Local Government Act 1972, which made Norfolk a non-metropolitan county. As part of the 1974 reforms the county council gained responsibility for the two former county boroughs of Norwich and Great Yarmouth. The lower tier of local government was rearranged at the same time, with the county's numerous boroughs, urban districts and rural districts reorganised into seven non-metropolitan districts.

In March 2026, the government announced local government reorganisation plans, which would have seen the county council abolished in 2028 and local government across Norfolk reorganised into three unitary authorities. These proposals were withdrawn pending review in September 2026.

== Governance ==
Norfolk County Council provides county-level services. District-level services are provided by the county's seven district councils. The districts are Breckland, Broadland, Great Yarmouth, North Norfolk, Norwich City Council, King's Lynn and West Norfolk, and South Norfolk.

Much of the county is also covered by civil parishes, which form a third tier of local government.

=== Political control ===
The council had been under Conservative majority control from 2017 until 2026, but is now under no overall control. Political control of the council since the 1974 reforms has been as follows:

| Party in control | Years |
|---|---|
| Conservative | 1974–1993 |
| No overall control | 1993–2001 |
| Conservative | 2001–2013 |
| No overall control | 2013–2017 |
| Conservative | 2017–2026 |
| No overall control | 2026–Present |

=== Leadership ===
Sir William Ffolkes, chairman 1902–1912

Prior to the 1974 reforms, the chairman of the council was also its political leader. The chairmen from 1889 to 1974 were:

| Councillor | Party | From | To |
|---|---|---|---|
| Robert Gurdon | Liberal Unionist | 1 Apr 1889 | 5 Apr 1902 |
| William ffolkes | Liberal Unionist | 5 Apr 1902 | 6 Apr 1912 |
| John Sancroft Holmes | Conservative | 6 Apr 1912 | 10 Apr 1920 |
| Ailwyn Fellowes | Conservative | 10 Apr 1920 | 23 Sep 1924 |
| Russell Colman | Conservative | 14 Mar 1925 | 4 Jan 1941 |
| Henry Upcher | Conservative | 5 Apr 1941 | 1 Apr 1950 |
| Bartle Edwards | Conservative | 1 Apr 1950 | 2 Apr 1966 |
| Douglas Sanderson | Conservative | 2 Apr 1966 | 11 Mar 1969 |
| John Hayden | Conservative | 12 Apr 1969 | 31 Mar 1974 |

Since 1974 the chair has been a more ceremonial role, with political leadership provided instead by the leader of the council. The leaders since 1974 have been:

| Councillor | Party | From | To |
|---|---|---|---|
| Ian Coutts | Conservative | 1 Apr 1974 | 1979 |
| Michael Chaplin | Conservative | 1979 | May 1981 |
| John Alston | Conservative | 1981 | 1987 |
| Peter Rollin | Conservative | 1987 | 15 May 1989 |
| John Alston | Conservative | 15 May 1989 | 1993 |
| Celia Cameron | Labour | 1993 | 2001 |
| Alison King | Conservative | Jun 2001 | Mar 2006 |
| Shaun Murphy | Conservative | Mar 2006 | 2 Apr 2007 |
| Daniel Cox | Conservative | 2 Apr 2007 | Oct 2010 |
| Derrick Murphy | Conservative | 11 Oct 2010 | 9 Jan 2013 |
| Bill Borrett | Conservative | 25 Feb 2013 | 13 May 2013 |
| George Nobbs | Labour | 24 May 2013 | 9 May 2016 |
| Cliff Jordan | Conservative | 9 May 2016 | 18 May 2018 |
| Andrew Proctor | Conservative | 1 Jun 2018 | 2023 |
| Kay Mason Billig | Conservative | 9 May 2023 | May 2026 |
| David Bick | Reform | 28 May 2026 | |

=== Composition ===
After the 2026 election, a subsequent by-election and the resignation of Great Yarmouth First leader, Jon Wedon, the composition of the council was:

| Party | Seats |
|---|---|
| Reform | 38 |
| Liberal Democrats | 13 |
| Green | 12 |
| Great Yarmouth First | 8 |
| Conservative | 9 |
| Labour | 1 |
| Independent | 3 |
| Total | 84 |

=== Elections ===
Since the last boundary changes in 2005 Norfolk has been divided into 84 electoral divisions, each electing one councillor. Elections are held every four years. New division boundaries have been drawn up to take effect from the next elections.

The elections that had been due to take place in May 2025 were postponed, to allow for proposed local government structures for the area to be considered.

== Premises ==
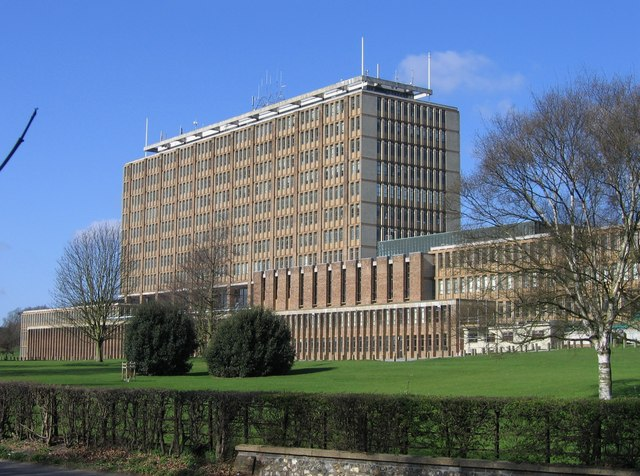
County Hall, Norwich

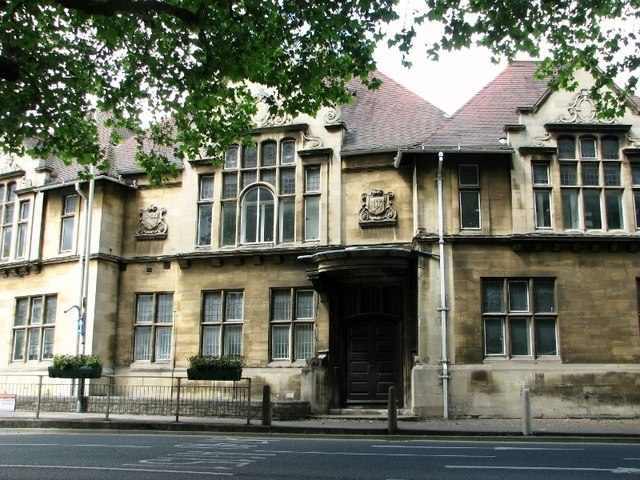
Shirehall Chambers

The council is based at County Hall on Martineau Lane in Norwich. The building was purpose-built for the council, designed by modernist architect Reginald Uren, and opened in 1968.

Prior to 1968 the council had been based at the Shirehall on Market Avenue in Norwich, which had been built in 1823 as a courthouse within the grounds of Norwich Castle. The building was extended in 1909 with offices for the county council known as the Shirehall Chambers.

== Education ==
The council is in charge of nursery, primary and secondary state schools in Norfolk that are not academies. It does not have responsibility for tertiary education within the county.

The council provides a school finder for parents to find children a school. The primary school curriculum is set by the government, and recorded on Directgov. The secondary (high) school curriculum is set by the government, and recorded on Directgov. There are compulsory subjects which are needed to be followed in Norfolk and England.

In Year 9 (sometimes Year 8), children are required to pick their GCSE options for the forecoming year. In England, a student must take at least two optional choices.

In February 2013, Ofsted inspectors judged that vulnerable children in the county were at risk. Shortly afterwards, the regulator expressed concern about the county's educational provision. Three years later, in August 2016, Ofsted found that Norfolk County Council had still failed to address the regulator's earlier judgements (in February and August 2013, respectively) that the council's arrangements for the protection of children and for services for looked-after children were "inadequate". In 2017 after further inspection the rating was raised to 'requires improvement' after considerable progress in the department.

== Health and social care ==
The council is responsible for coordinating and managing the adult social care of the population of Norfolk. This work was overseen by the Adult Social Care Committee based at County Hall. However, in May 2019 the committee was abolished and its responsibilities transferred to the Cabinet Member for Adult Social Care, Public Health and Prevention.

Since 2012 the Health and Wellbeing Board for Norfolk and Waveney has been responsible for public health in the county. The board has been chaired by Cllr. Bill Borrett since 2017; it comprises representatives from most NHS bodies such as the five Clinical Commissioning Groups and the three Norfolk Acute Hospitals as well as Norfolk and Waveney's County and District Councils.

See Healthcare in Norfolk for the details of the different NHS bodies charged with delivering health in the county.

== Transportation ==
Norfolk County Council is responsible for maintaining Norfolk's 10,000 kilometres (6,200 mi) road networks and bus routes. They often go into schools and promote road safety to students.

== Conservation ==
Norfolk County Council offered grant aid for landscape conservation, submitted to the Director of Planning and Transportation. Many historic buildings in the county are protected by the Norfolk Historic Buildings Trust, established in 1977, which is under the guidance of the county council. Similarly, the council has operated the Norfolk Museums Service since 1974. Between 1995 and 2000, the Trust played a major role in restoring Denver Windmill, at a cost of over £1 million.

== Notable members ==
- Steffan Aquarone
- Walter Keppel, 9th Earl of Albemarle
- Jack Boddy
- Michael Carttiss
- Judith Chaplin
- Robert Chase
- Richard Toby Coke
- Sir Thomas Cook
- Sidney Dye
- George Edwards
- John Garrett
- Albert Astley, 21st Baron Hastings, 1909–1919
- Paul Hawkins
- Terry Jermy
- Dave Rowntree
- William Benjamin Taylor
- Robert Walpole
- John Wodehouse, 2nd Earl of Kimberley
- Albert Hilton, Baron Hilton of Upton
- Lilias Rider Haggard
- Catherine Rowett
