= 1993 Norfolk County Council election =

1993 UK local government election

← 1989	7 May 1993	1997 →

All 84 seats to Norfolk County Council 43 seats needed for a majority
- Registered: 593,873 (▲1.7%)
- Turnout: 39.3% (▼1.5%)

	First party	Second party	Third party
Party	Conservative	Labour	Liberal Democrats
Last election	47 seats, 42.7%	28 seats, 34.4%	9 seats, 17.7%
Seats won	34	32	16
Seat change	▼13	▲4	▲7
Popular vote	83,308	84,785	60,416
Percentage	35.7%	36.3%	25.9%
Swing	▼7.0%	▲1.9%	▲8.2%
Council control before election
Conservative
Council control after election
No overall control

The 1993 Norfolk County Council election took place on 7 May 1993 to elect members of Norfolk County Council in Norfolk, England. This was on the same day as other local elections.

== Summary ==
The Conservatives lost control of the County Council for the first time since it was formed in the 19th century, amid dire results for the party nationally.

=== Election result ===
1993 Norfolk County Council election
Party	Candidates	Seats	Gains	Losses	Net gain/loss	Seats %	Votes %	Votes	+/−
Conservative	83	34	0	13	▼13	40.5	35.7	83,308	–7.0
Labour	84	32	4	0	▲4	38.1	36.3	84,785	+1.9
Liberal Democrats	72	16	7	0	▲7	19.0	25.9	60,416	+8.2
Independent	3	2	2	0	▲2	2.4	1.3	3,031	+1.2
Green	14	0	0	0	Steady	0.0	0.8	1,964	–3.4

=== Election of Group Leaders ===
Celia Cameron (St. Stephen) remained leader of the Labour Group, Alison King (Humbleyard) was elected leader of the Conservative Group and Stephen Revell (Clavering) was re-elected leader of the Liberal Democratic Group.

=== Election of Leader of the Council ===
Celia Cameron (St. Stephen) the leader of the Labour group was duly elected leader of the council and formed a Labour/Lib Dem administration.

== Division results by local authority ==
=== Breckland ===
Breckland District Summary
Party	Seats	+/-	Votes	%	+/-
Conservative	7	▼2	12,914	43.5	–5.9
Labour	3	▲1	10,975	37.0	+2.0
Independent	1	▲1	917	3.1	N/A
Liberal Democrats	0	Steady	4,123	13.9	+4.9
Green	0	Steady	764	2.6	–2.5
Total	11	Steady	29,693	36.4	–3.3
Registered electors			81,508	–	+3.7

Division results

Attleborough
Party	Candidate	Votes	%	±%
Conservative	John Alston *	1,687	53.1	–9.0
Labour	John Williams	905	28.5	+8.4
Liberal Democrats	Daniel Jeffrey	588	18.5	+8.5
Majority		782	24.6	
Turnout		3,180	34.2	
Conservative hold		Swing	▼8.7	

Dereham East
Party	Candidate	Votes	%	±%
Labour	Leslie Potter *	1,362	45.8	–4.6
Conservative	Clifton Jordan	1,132	38.0	–1.4
Liberal Democrats	Peter Kane	482	16.2	+6.0
Majority		230	7.7	
Turnout		2,976	38.7	
Labour hold		Swing	▼1.6	

Dereham West
Party	Candidate	Votes	%	±%
Conservative	Margaret Dulgan *	1,245	41.5	–4.1
Labour	S. Jones	1,017	33.9	–1.4
Green	Tony Park	457	15.2	+3.3
Liberal Democrats	R. Buck	282	9.4	+2.3
Majority		228	7.6	
Turnout		3,001	36.8	
Conservative hold		Swing	▼1.4	

Elmham & Mattishall
Party	Candidate	Votes	%	±%
Conservative	Ingrid Floering-Blackman *	1,532	49.9	−4.1
Labour	J. Copsy	785	25.6	−5.6
Liberal Democrats	S. Wilson	579	18.9	+4.1
Green	S. Belfield	175	5.7	N/A
Majority		747	24.3	
Turnout		3,071	38.3	
Conservative hold		Swing	▲0.8	

Guiltcross
Party	Candidate	Votes	%	±%
Conservative	John Baskerville	1,304	45.0	−3.5
Labour	Anne Hanson	918	31.7	+8.8
Liberal Democrats	S. Gordon	678	23.4	+17.1
Majority		386	13.3	
Turnout		2,900	42.2	
Conservative hold		Swing	▼6.2	

Necton & Launditch
Party	Candidate	Votes	%	±%
Labour	David Holland	1,657	44.0	+6.9
Conservative	John Birkbeck *	1,620	43.0	–4.1
Liberal Democrats	Nicolas Starling	357	9.5	–0.5
Green	Alison Cooper	132	3.5	–2.3
Majority		37	1.0	
Turnout		3,766	48.5	
Labour gain from Conservative		Swing	▲5.5	

Swaffham
Party	Candidate	Votes	%	±%
Conservative	Kay Mason	1,302	51.1	–14.0
Labour	Leslie Wise	855	33.5	–1.4
Liberal Democrats	John Glover	393	15.4	N/A
Majority		447	17.5	
Turnout		2,550	35.3	
Conservative hold		Swing	▼6.3	

Thetford East
Party	Candidate	Votes	%	±%
Independent	Terence Lamb	917	36.4	N/A
Labour	K. Key	911	36.2	−1.0
Conservative	A. McCaffery	691	27.4	−17.5
Majority		6	0.2	
Turnout		2,519	32.1	
Independent gain from Conservative		Swing	N/A	

Thetford West
Party	Candidate	Votes	%	±%
Labour	Thelma Paines *	1,197	71.4	+20.6
Conservative	F. Attfield	480	28.6	−3.2
Majority		717	42.8	
Turnout		1,677	27.8	
Labour hold		Swing	▲11.9	

Watton
Party	Candidate	Votes	%	±%
Conservative	John Beddoes *	1,365	51.7	–12.1
Liberal Democrats	A. Donovan	764	29.0	+13.5
Labour	R. Barker	510	19.3	–1.4
Majority		601	22.8	
Turnout		2,639	34.0	
Conservative hold		Swing	▼12.8	

Wissey
Party	Candidate	Votes	%	±%
Conservative	Samuel Steward *	1,246	46.9	–11.1
Liberal Democrats	Roland Barrington-Green	805	30.3	+11.3
Labour	David Curzon-Berners	607	22.8	−0.2
Majority		441	16.6	
Turnout		2,658	36.3	
Conservative hold		Swing	▼11.2	

=== Broadland ===
Broadland District Summary
Party	Seats	+/-	Votes	%	+/-
Conservative	8	▼2	13,449	40.9	–7.7
Labour	3	▲2	10,623	32.3	+10.2
Liberal Democrats	1	Steady	8,062	24.5	–0.4
Independent	0	Steady	653	2.0	N/A
Green	0	Steady	135	0.4	–3.2
Total	12	Steady	32,922	38.6	+1.3
Registered electors			85,394	–	+2.4

Division results

Acle
Party	Candidate	Votes	%	±%
Conservative	Robert Chase *	1,055	44.6	–11.9
Labour	K. Duckworth	853	36.1	+10.2
Liberal Democrats	K. Fursse	457	19.3	+1.7
Majority		202	8.5	
Turnout		2,365	38.2	
Conservative hold		Swing	▼11.1	

Aylsham
Party	Candidate	Votes	%	±%
Labour	G. Colk	1,596	50.4	+20.3
Conservative	Frances Roualle *	1,117	35.3	−16.8
Liberal Democrats	A. Drury	452	14.3	−3.5
Majority		479	15.1	
Turnout		3,165	42.8	
Labour gain from Conservative		Swing	▲18.6	

Blofield and Brundall
Party	Candidate	Votes	%	±%
Conservative	C. Mowle	1,742	54.4	–1.3
Liberal Democrats	M. Glauert	730	22.8	–21.5
Labour	M. Higgleton	730	22.8	N/A
Majority		1,012	31.6	
Turnout		3,202	38.7	
Conservative hold		Swing	▲10.1	

Hellesdon
Party	Candidate	Votes	%	±%
Conservative	Margaret Clark *	944	37.2	−4.2
Labour	P. Scott	908	35.7	+12.3
Liberal Democrats	L. Bond	689	27.1	–8.1
Majority		36	1.4	
Turnout		2,541	39.1	
Conservative hold		Swing	▼8.3	

Horsford
Party	Candidate	Votes	%	±%
Liberal Democrats	C. Cogman	971	43.5	+2.0
Conservative	D. Perry	708	31.7	−6.2
Labour	C. Bensley	554	24.8	+4.3
Majority		263	11.8	
Turnout		2,233	36.2	
Liberal Democrats hold		Swing	▲4.1	

Old Catton
Party	Candidate	Votes	%	±%
Conservative	E. Austin	1,213	46.1	−5.9
Labour	S. Morphew	747	28.4	+10.1
Liberal Democrats	A. Young	669	25.4	+4.1
Majority		466	17.7	
Turnout		2,629	34.0	
Conservative hold		Swing	▼8.0	

Reepham
Party	Candidate	Votes	%	±%
Conservative	S. Marshall*	1,116	46.4	−7.3
Labour	P. Carman	610	25.4	+6.3
Liberal Democrats	V. Beadle	542	22.6	+9.2
Green	S. Vick	135	5.6	−8.2
Majority		506	21.1	
Turnout		2,403	36.8	
Conservative hold		Swing	▼6.8	

Sprowston
Party	Candidate	Votes	%	±%
Labour	K. Lashley*	1,319	38.6	−3.0
Liberal Democrats	D. Dewgarde	1,213	35.5	+14.4
Conservative	H. Maidment	881	25.8	−7.8
Majority		106	3.1	
Turnout		3,413	45.3	
Labour hold		Swing	▼8.7	

Taverham
Party	Candidate	Votes	%	±%
Conservative	D. Burrell*	1,287	47.8	+5.3
Liberal Democrats	J. Robinson	935	34.7	−3.5
Labour	S. Wright	469	17.4	+6.7
Majority		352	13.1	
Turnout		2,691	32.6	
Conservative hold		Swing	▲4.4	

Thorpe St. Andrew
Party	Candidate	Votes	%	±%
Labour	J. Cook	1,416	41.6	+15.3
Conservative	E. Cocks	1,040	30.6	−21.4
Independent	F. Oxborough*	653	19.2	N/A
Liberal Democrats	D. Ryan	293	8.6	−4.5
Majority		376	11.1	
Turnout		3,402	46.2	
Labour gain from Conservative		Swing	▲18.4	

Woodside
Party	Candidate	Votes	%	±%
Conservative	R. Marshall	1,018	42.0	−10.1
Labour	B. Lashley	835	34.5	+3.7
Liberal Democrats	J. Goodey	569	23.5	+13.6
Majority		183	7.6	
Turnout		2,422	35.2	
Conservative hold		Swing	▼6.9	

Wroxham
Party	Candidate	Votes	%	±%
Conservative	J. Peel*	1,298	53.5	−6.0
Labour	P. Buck	586	24.2	+7.8
Liberal Democrats	V. Fazakerley	542	22.3	−1.8
Majority		712	29.3	
Turnout		2,426	37.0	
Conservative hold		Swing	▼6.9	

=== Great Yarmouth ===
Great Yarmouth District Summary
Party	Seats	+/-	Votes	%	+/-
Labour	6	Steady	12,088	58.7	+9.2
Conservative	4	b	8,508	41.3	–2.5
Total	10	Steady	20,596	32.2	–1.0
Registered electors			64,060	–	+1.1

Division results

Caister & Great Yarmouth North
Party	Candidate	Votes	%	±%
Labour	Patrick Hacon*	1,443	59.6	+3.0
Conservative	J. Shrimplin	980	40.4	−3.0
Majority		463	19.1	
Turnout		2,423	36.9	
Labour hold		Swing	▲3.0	

East Flegg
Party	Candidate	Votes	%	±%
Conservative	Frank Stuttaford *	1,529	57.2	–4.3
Labour	J. Doyle	1,142	42.8	+11.3
Majority		387	14.5	
Turnout		2,671	32.5	
Conservative hold		Swing	▼7.8	

Gorleston St. Andrews
Party	Candidate	Votes	%	±%
Conservative	Godfred Girling	1,098	51.4	±0.0
Labour	B. Baughan	1,038	48.6	+6.9
Majority		60	2.8	
Turnout		2,136	37.5	
Conservative hold		Swing	▼3.5	

Great Yarmouth Nelson
Party	Candidate	Votes	%	±%
Labour	John Holmes *	1,367	66.0	+16.5
Conservative	G. Doyle	704	34.0	+2.3
Majority		663	32.0	
Turnout		2,071	31.7	
Labour hold		Swing	▲7.1	

Lothingland East & Magdalen West
Party	Candidate	Votes	%	±%
Labour	P. Mason*	1,747	65.3	+8.9
Conservative	M. Taylor	929	m34.7	−0.9
Majority		818	30.6	
Turnout		2,676	32.6	
Labour hold		Swing	▲4.9	

Lothingland West
Party	Candidate	Votes	%	±%
Conservative	P. Timewell	1,193	51.0	−2.3
Labour	R. Stringer	1,145	49.0	+11.7
Majority		48	2.1	
Turnout		2,338	27.4	
Conservative hold		Swing	▼7.0	

Magdalen East & Claydon
Party	Candidate	Votes	%	±%
Labour	A. Blyth*	1,366	72.7	−1.8
Conservative	J. Russell	514	27.3	+1.8
Majority		852	45.3	
Turnout		1,880	33.5	
Labour hold		Swing	▼1.8	

Northgate
Party	Candidate	Votes	%	±%
Labour	D. Gall	858	60.7	+5.9
Conservative	C. Hodds	556	39.3	+5.9
Majority		302	21.4	
Turnout		1,414	29.2	
Labour hold		Swing	0.0	

Southtown & Cobholm
Party	Candidate	Votes	%	±%
Labour	M. Castle*	1,369	70.2	−3.5
Conservative	A. Shirland	582	29.8	+3.5
Majority		787	40.3	
Turnout		1,951	28.2	
Labour hold		Swing	▼3.5	

West Flegg
Party	Candidate	Votes	%	±%
Conservative	M. Lovewell Blake*	1,366	55.8	–3.2
Labour	R. Huxtable	1,084	44.2	+11.3
Majority		282	11.5	
Turnout		2,450	31.7	
Conservative hold		Swing	▼7.3	

=== King's Lynn and West Norfolk ===
King's Lynn & West Norfolk District Summary
Party	Seats	+/-	Votes	%	+/-
Conservative	8	▼3	16,444	40.9	–9.1
Labour	4	▲1	13,831	34.4	–2.6
Liberal Democrats	2	▲2	9,712	24.2	+11.9
Green	0	Steady	199	0.5	N/A
Total	14	Steady	40,196	36.6	–0.1
Registered electors			109,781	–	–0.4

Division results

Dersingham
Party	Candidate	Votes	%	±%
Conservative	George Pratt *	1,399	39.0	–18.2
Liberal Democrats	Paul Burall	1,370	38.2	+27.7
Labour	Philip Warner	820	22.8	–9.5
Majority		29	0.8	
Turnout		3,589	44.9	
Conservative hold		Swing	▼23.0	

Docking
Party	Candidate	Votes	%	±%
Conservative	Stephen Bett *	1,418	50.3	–1.0
Labour	Stephen Harmer	942	33.4	–4.5
Liberal Democrats	Pamela Stewart	457	16.2	+5.4
Majority		476	16.9	
Turnout		2,817	38.9	
Conservative hold		Swing	▲1.8	

Downham Market
Party	Candidate	Votes	%	±%
Conservative	Harold Rose *	1,307	50.8	−7.8
Labour	Gillian Stewart	892	34.7	+2.2
Liberal Democrats	Wendy Thorne	271	10.5	+1.5
Green	Paul Arnold	101	3.9	N/A
Majority		415	16.1	
Turnout		2,571	36.6	
Conservative hold		Swing	▼5.0	

Feltwell
Party	Candidate	Votes	%	±%
Liberal Democrats	David Buckton	1,236	48.8	+31.4
Conservative	Robert Marsh-Allen*	919	36.3	–22.7
Labour	Roger Parnell	377	14.9	–8.7
Majority		317	12.5	
Turnout		2,532	38.1	
Liberal Democrats gain from Conservative		Swing	▲27.1	

Fincham
Party	Candidate	Votes	%	±%
Conservative	Richard Rockcliffe *	1,158	42.0	–9.9
Liberal Democrats	Alan Waterman	1,153	41.8	+28.0
Labour	Lawrence Wilkinson	445	16.1	–18.2
Majority		5	0.2	
Turnout		2,756	39.2	
Conservative hold		Swing	▼19.0	

Freebridge Lynn
Party	Candidate	Votes	%	±%
Conservative	Joan Dutton *	1,792	48.3	−12.2
Liberal Democrats	Matthew Farthing	1,178	31.8	+16.9
Labour	Mark Steele	738	19.9	–4.7
Majority		614	16.6	
Turnout		3,708	42.8	
Conservative hold		Swing	▼14.6	

Gaywood North & Central
Party	Candidate	Votes	%	±%
Labour	Mary King	1,388	48.2	+14.0
Conservative	Berry Barton *	1,089	37.8	–5.8
Liberal Democrats	Derek Neve	404	14.0	–8.3
Majority		299	10.4	
Turnout		2,881	34.2	
Labour gain from Conservative		Swing	▲9.9	

Gaywood South
Party	Candidate	Votes	%	±%
Labour	William Davidson *	1,006	71.3	–3.1
Conservative	Henry Stern	283	18.7	+0.5
Liberal Democrats	Barbara Howling	141	10.0	+2.7
Majority		723	52.7	
Turnout		1,410	29.1	
Labour hold		Swing	▼1.8	

Hunstanton
Party	Candidate	Votes	%	±%
Conservative	John Lambert *	1,702	46.8	−6.8
Labour	Arthur Mostyn-Evans	1,580	43.5	+4.9
Liberal Democrats	Paul Witley	354	9.7	+1.9
Majority		122	3.4	
Turnout		3,636	42.7	
Conservative hold		Swing	▼5.9	

Kings Lynn North & Central
Party	Candidate	Votes	%	±%
Labour	John Donaldson *	1,511	71.0	+4.3
Conservative	Alan Stoker	447	21.0	–0.9
Liberal Democrats	Nicholas Kulkami	169	7.9	N/A
Majority		1,064	50.0	
Turnout		2,127	30.7	
Labour hold		Swing	▲2.6	

Kings Lynn South
Party	Candidate	Votes	%	±%
Labour	Bryan Seaman *	1,415	69.3	+0.3
Conservative	Ann White	439	21.5	−4.3
Liberal Democrats	Kevin Leeder	187	9.2	+4.0
Majority		976	47.8	
Turnout		2,041	34.2	
Labour hold		Swing	▲2.5	

Marshland North
Party	Candidate	Votes	%	±%
Liberal Democrats	Shirley Clery-Fox	1,263	48.3	+18.8
Conservative	Steven Dorrington *	863	33.0	–13.0
Labour	Penelope Snape	490	18.7	–5.7
Majority		400	15.3	
Turnout		2,616	31.6	
Liberal Democrats gain from Conservative		Swing	▲15.9	

Marshland South
Party	Candidate	Votes	%	±%
Conservative	Harry Humphrey	1,161	52.0	–12.5
Labour	Jack Bantoft	793	35.5	±0.0
Liberal Democrats	John Marsh	278	12.5	N/A
Majority		368	16.5	
Turnout		2,232	28.9	
Conservative hold		Swing	▼6.3	

Winch
Party	Candidate	Votes	%	±%
Conservative	Heather Bolt*	1,221	47.1	−13.5
Labour	George Hayton	827	31.9	+6.2
Liberal Democrats	Philippa Gray	446	17.2	+3.6
Green	Michael Walker	98	3.8	N/A
Majority		394	15.2	
Turnout		2,592	36.1	
Conservative hold		Swing	▼9.9	

=== North Norfolk ===
North Norfolk District Summary
Party	Seats	+/-	Votes	%	+/-
Labour	4	Steady	11,323	32.5	–0.9
Liberal Democrats	3	▲3	10,870	31.2	+17.0
Conservative	2	▼4	11,061	31.8	–14.6
Independent	1	▲1	1,461	4.2	N/A
Green	0	Steady	101	0.3	–4.4
Total	10	Steady	34,816	46.2	+0.9
Registered electors			75,310	–	+3.3

Division results

Cromer
Party	Candidate	Votes	%	±%
Conservative	Derek Turnbull *	1,308	41.5	−7.0
Liberal Democrats	G. Dunlam	1,119	35.5	+11.2
Labour	D. Bussey	627	19.9	−7.4
Green	Peter Crouch	101	3.2	N/A
Majority		189	6.0	
Turnout		3,155	42.0	
Conservative hold		Swing	▼9.1	

Erpingham & Melton Constable
Party	Candidate	Votes	%	±%
Labour	Martyn Warnes*	1,953	56.8	+12.8
Conservative	H. Bessemer-Clark	1,058	30.8	–9.0
Liberal Democrats	T. Jenner-Ludbrook	427	12.4	–3.8
Majority		895	26.0	
Turnout		3,438	51.6	
Labour hold		Swing	▲10.9	

Fakenham
Party	Candidate	Votes	%	±%
Labour	Dennis Parsons *	1,671	53.8	+3.1
Conservative	Keith Barrow	1,030	33.2	−16.1
Liberal Democrats	Oliver Towers	406	13.1	N/A
Majority		641	20.6	
Turnout		3,107	40.2	
Labour hold		Swing	▲8.7	

Holt
Party	Candidate	Votes	%	±%
Liberal Democrats	W. Cooke	2,085	53.3	+21.8
Conservative	M. Perry-Warnes	1,447	37.0	−11.3
Labour	R. Kelham	380	9.7	−10.5
Majority		638	16.3	
Turnout		3,912	53.8	
Liberal Democrats gain from Conservative		Swing	▲16.6	

Mundesley
Party	Candidate	Votes	%	±%
Liberal Democrats	P. Baldwin	2,165	57.7	+45.5
Conservative	A. Cargill	1,142	30.4	−18.1
Labour	C. Collins	448	11.9	−13.4
Majority		1,023	27.2	
Turnout		3,755	48.7	
Liberal Democrats gain from Conservative		Swing	▲31.8	

North Smallburgh
Party	Candidate	Votes	%	±%
Labour	S. Cullingham*	1,946	53.5	+25.5
Conservative	A. Brackenbury	1,236	34.0	−20.1
Liberal Democrats	C. Wilkins	454	12.5	N/A
Majority		710	19.5	
Turnout		3,636	45.2	
Labour hold		Swing	▲22.8	

North Walsham
Party	Candidate	Votes	%	±%
Labour	M. Booth*	1,731	48.4	+3.8
Conservative	P. Quittenden	1,007	28.2	−15.4
Liberal Democrats	B. Sheridan	835	23.4	N/A
Majority		724	20.3	
Turnout		3,573	42.3	
Labour hold		Swing	▲9.6	

Sheringham
Party	Candidate	Votes	%	±%
Liberal Democrats	M. Craske	2,150	58.2	+28.9
Conservative	R. Seligman*	1,269	34.4	−11.4
Labour	P. Harding	272	7.4	−7.0
Majority		881	23.9	
Turnout		3,691	47.6	
Liberal Democrats gain from Conservative		Swing	▲20.2	

South Smallburgh
Party	Candidate	Votes	%	±%
Conservative	L. Mogford*	1,564	52.0	−2.1
Labour	R. Harding	1,004	33.4	+5.4
Liberal Democrats	Y. Rushman	438	14.6	−3.3
Majority		560	18.6	
Turnout		3,006	41.1	
Conservative hold		Swing	▼3.8	

Wells
Party	Candidate	Votes	%	±%
Independent	Graham Ashworth *	1,461	41.2	N/A
Labour	James Wallace	1,291	36.4	–3.0
Liberal Democrats	Anthony Groom	791	22.3	+10.6
Majority		170	4.8	N/A
Turnout		3,543	51.9	–0.3
Registered electors		6,827		
Independent gain from Conservative		Swing		

=== Norwich ===
Norwich District Summary
Party	Seats	+/-	Votes	%	+/-
Labour	12	Steady	19.900	53.0	+0.1
Liberal Democrats	3	Steady	10,502	28.0	+11.7
Conservative	1	Steady	6,757	18.0	–3.4
Green	0	Steady	413	1.1	–7.9
Total	16	Steady	37,572	39.7	–5.1
Registered electors			94,595	–	+0.3

Division results

Bowthorpe
Party	Candidate	Votes	%	±%
Labour	Josephine Britton	1,533	65.5	−4.1
Conservative	H. Collins	414	17.7	±0.0
Liberal Democrats	P. Cornwell	312	13.3	+7.5
Green	Susan Pollard	82	3.5	−3.3
Majority		1,119	47.8	
Turnout		2,341	31.1	
Labour hold		Swing	▼2.1	

Catton Grove
Party	Candidate	Votes	%	±%
Labour	David Tilley*	1,138	61.8	+0.9
Conservative	P. Kearney	436	23.7	+1.2
Liberal Democrats	A. Moore	267	14.5	+7.8
Majority		702	38.1	
Turnout		1,841	29.4	
Labour hold		Swing	▼0.2	

Coslany
Party	Candidate	Votes	%	±%
Labour	Catherine Ward	1,444	64.2	+2.5
Conservative	Ernest Horth	479	21.3	+0.4
Liberal Democrats	Edward Maxfield	326	14.5	+7.6
Majority		965	42.9	
Turnout		2,249	37.0	
Labour hold		Swing	▲1.1	

Crome
Party	Candidate	Votes	%	±%
Labour	D. Bland	1,389	66.3	−1.2
Conservative	J. Beckett	387	18.5	−0.8
Liberal Democrats	D. Mackeller	320	15.3	+6.6
Majority		1,002	47.8	
Turnout		2,096	37.2	
Labour hold		Swing	▼0.2	

Eaton
Party	Candidate	Votes	%	±%
Conservative	Bruce Wallis*	1,590	48.3	−3.5
Labour	J. Clissold	919	27.9	−2.8
Liberal Democrats	F. Hartley	785	23.8	+15.9
Majority		671	20.4	
Turnout		3,294	51.2	
Conservative hold		Swing	▼0.4	

Heigham
Party	Candidate	Votes	%	±%
Labour	John Sheppard *	1,206	51.7	−15.4
Liberal Democrats	A. Dunthorne	954	40.9	+32.4
Conservative	A. Quinn	174	7.5	−9.6
Majority		252	10.8	
Turnout		2,334	41.0	
Labour hold		Swing	▼23.9	

Henderson
Party	Candidate	Votes	%	±%
Labour	Richard Phelan *	1,250	70.3	+7.5
Liberal Democrats	L. Dunthorne	272	15.3	+10.8
Conservative	P. Munday	257	14.4	–0.7
Majority		978	55.0	
Turnout		1,779	31.1	
Labour hold		Swing	▼1.7	

Lakenham
Party	Candidate	Votes	%	±%
Labour	Penelope Ross *	1,371	65.4	−1.4
Conservative	E. Cooper	398	19.0	+0.2
Liberal Democrats	D. Elgood	328	15.6	+10.3
Majority		973	46.4	
Turnout		2,097	36.2	
Labour hold		Swing	▼0.6	

Mancroft
Party	Candidate	Votes	%	±%
Labour	L. Addison*	1,396	61.7	+0.5
Conservative	R. Moore	519	23.0	+0.5
Liberal Democrats	C. Risebrook	346	15.3	+9.0
Majority		877	38.8	
Turnout		2,261	35.3	
Labour hold		Swing	0.0	

Mile Cross
Party	Candidate	Votes	%	±%
Labour	A. Panes	1,064	63.0	−16.4
Liberal Democrats	J. Wilkes	454	26.9	+24.0
Conservative	L. Quayle	170	10.1	−3.2
Majority		610	36.1	
Turnout		1,688	29.9	
Labour hold		Swing	▼20.2	

Mousehold
Party	Candidate	Votes	%	±%
Labour	P. Buttle*	1,380	68.6	+7.6
Conservative	I. Evans	283	14.1	−3.3
Liberal Democrats	R. Priest	230	11.4	+5.4
Green	L. Moore	118	5.9	−9.8
Majority		1,097	54.5	
Turnout		2,011	31.9	
Labour hold		Swing	▲5.5	

Nelson
Party	Candidate	Votes	%	±%
Liberal Democrats	Adrian Warnes	1,479	52.3	+9.2
Labour	S. Dent	1,130	40.0	+4.6
Conservative	G. Drake	219	7.7	−6.4
Majority		349	12.3	
Turnout		2,828	55.8	
Liberal Democrats hold		Swing	▲2.3	

St. Stephen
Party	Candidate	Votes	%	±%
Labour	C. Cameron*	1,477	59.1	+8.9
Conservative	A. Daws	588	23.5	−7.8
Liberal Democrats	A. Leeder	324	13.0	+7.3
Green	A. Holmes	109	4.4	−8.4
Majority		889	35.6	
Turnout		2,498	46.1	
Labour hold		Swing	▲8.4	

Thorpe Hamlet
Party	Candidate	Votes	%	±%
Liberal Democrats	B. Hacker	1,338	56.8	+11.6
Labour	M. Pendred	666	28.3	+0.3
Conservative	L. Cooper	249	10.6	−5.9
Green	K. Stubbs	104	4.4	−6.0
Majority		672	28.5	
Turnout		2,357	39.5	
Liberal Democrats hold		Swing	▲5.7	

Town Close
Party	Candidate	Votes	%	±%
Liberal Democrats	C. Harper	1,657	52.7	+13.1
Labour	B. Smith	1,190	37.8	−0.3
Conservative	S. Allman	300	9.5	−7.1
Majority		467	14.8	
Turnout		3,147	56.4	
Liberal Democrats hold		Swing	▲6.7	

University
Party	Candidate	Votes	%	±%
Labour	G. Turner*	1,347	49.0	+5.6
Liberal Democrats	S. Fearnley	1,110	40.3	+4.7
Conservative	M. Hayden	294	10.7	−1.1
Majority		237	8.6	
Turnout		2,751	54.2	
Labour hold		Swing	▲0.5	

=== South Norfolk ===
South Norfolk District Summary
Party	Seats	+/-	Votes	%	+/-
Liberal Democrats	7	▲2	17,147	45.5	+9.2
Conservative	4	▼2	14,175	37.6	–7.0
Labour	0	Steady	6,045	16.0	+2.0
Green	0	Steady	352	0.9	–2.9
Total	11	Steady	37,719	45.3	–3.2
Registered electors			83,225	–	+2.5

Division results

Clavering
Party	Candidate	Votes	%	±%
Liberal Democrats	Stephen Revell *	1,943	58.0	+10.7
Conservative	R. Curtis	989	29.5	−8.8
Labour	R. McKie	418	12.5	−1.9
Majority		954	28.5	
Turnout		3,350	46.1	
Liberal Democrats hold		Swing	▲9.8	

Costessey
Party	Candidate	Votes	%	±%
Liberal Democrats	Kathleen Rogers *	1,826	59.5	+15.8
Conservative	N. Bull	844	27.5	−15.7
Labour	R. Borrett	397	12.9	+4.1
Majority		982	32.0	
Turnout		3,067	38.8	
Liberal Democrats hold		Swing	▲15.8	

Diss
Party	Candidate	Votes	%	±%
Liberal Democrats	I. Jacoby	1,453	42.7	+9.2
Conservative	M. Dain	1,043	30.6	−12.8
Labour	Daniel Zeichner	909	26.7	+11.2
Majority		410	12.0	
Turnout		3,405	40.8	
Liberal Democrats gain from Conservative		Swing	▲11.0	

East Depwade
Party	Candidate	Votes	%	±%
Liberal Democrats	A. Brownsea	1,819	51.1	+7.1
Conservative	R. Carter	1,296	36.4	−3.4
Labour	I. Stebbing	278	7.8	−1.6
Green	G. Sessions	166	4.7	−2.0
Majority		523	14.7	
Turnout		3,559	45.4	
Liberal Democrats hold		Swing	▲5.3	

Henstead
Party	Candidate	Votes	%	±%
Conservative	Graham Hemming *	1,456	45.4	+3.5
Liberal Democrats	S. Lawes	1,121	34.9	−3.7
Labour	J. King	531	16.5	+1.7
Green	S. Ross-Wagenknect	101	3.1	−1.7
Majority		335	10.4	
Turnout		3,209	45.6	
Conservative hold		Swing	▲3.6	

Hingham
Party	Candidate	Votes	%	±%
Liberal Democrats	J. Dore	1,588	51.2	+15.3
Conservative	C. Bayne	1,132	36.5	−12.3
Labour	L. Coleman	383	12.3	−3.1
Majority		456	14.7	
Turnout		3,103	48.4	
Liberal Democrats gain from Conservative		Swing	▲13.8	

Humbleyard
Party	Candidate	Votes	%	±%
Conservative	Alison King*	1,549	46.3	–3.8
Liberal Democrats	E. Phillips	1,538	46.0	+3.3
Labour	E. Bellamy	258	7.7	+0.5
Majority		11	0.3	
Turnout		3,345	48.9	
Conservative hold		Swing	▼3.6	

Loddon
Party	Candidate	Votes	%	±%
Conservative	Adrian Gunson *	2,345	62.6	−3.6
Labour	William McCloughan	701	18.7	−4.0
Liberal Democrats	M. Prior	698	18.6	N/A
Majority		1,644	43.9	
Turnout		3,744	52.4	
Conservative hold		Swing	▲0.2	

Long Stratton
Party	Candidate	Votes	%	±%
Liberal Democrats	Edward Littler	2,189	63.9	+7.6
Conservative	P. Howarth	901	26.3	−9.4
Labour	G. Aitken	335	9.8	+5.3
Majority		1,288	37.6	
Turnout		3,425	46.7	
Liberal Democrats hold		Swing	▲8.5	

West Depwade
Party	Candidate	Votes	%	±%
Conservative	N. Chapman*	1,488	45.7	−4.2
Liberal Democrats	R. McClenning	1,292	39.7	+20.0
Labour	D. Higgin	476	14.6	+2.8
Majority		196	6.0	
Turnout		3,256	40.3	
Conservative hold		Swing	▼12.1	

Wymondham
Party	Candidate	Votes	%	±%
Liberal Democrats	D. Hockaday*	1,680	39.5	+3.9
Labour	C. Needle	1,359	31.9	+2.7
Conservative	P. Tonkin	1,132	26.6	−8.6
Green	M. Robinson	85	2.0	N/A
Majority		321	7.5	
Turnout		4,256	47.2	
Liberal Democrats hold		Swing	▲0.6	
