= 1997 Norfolk County Council election =

1997 UK local government election

← 1993	1 May 1997	2001 →

All 84 council division seats 43 seats needed for a majority
- Registered: 607,689 (▲2.3%)
- Turnout: 73.5% (▲34.2%)

	First party	Second party	Third party
Party	Conservative	Labour	Liberal Democrats
Last election	34 seats, 35.8%	32 seats, 36.2%	16 seats, 25.9%
Seats before	33	31	17
Seats won	36	34	13
Seat change	▲2	▲2	▼3
Popular vote	156,719	165,751	109,090
Percentage	35.1%	37.1%	24.4%
Swing	▼0.7%	▲0.9%	▼1.5%
Party before election
No Overall Control
Elected Party
No Overall Control

The 1997 Norfolk County Council election took place on 1 May 1997, coinciding with local elections for county councils in England and the 1997 general election.

== Summary ==
The Council remained under No Overall Control. The Conservatives won the most seats, gaining 2, although Labour (who also gained 2) narrowly outpolled them in share of the vote, the Liberal Democrats lost 3 seats and one of the two independents lost their seat.

This is the last election to date where Labour received the most votes.

=== Election results ===
1997 Norfolk County Council election
Party	Candidates	Seats	Gains	Losses	Net gain/loss	Seats %	Votes %	Votes	+/−
Conservative	81	36	7	5	▲2	42.9	35.1	156,719	–0.6
Labour	84	34	6	4	▲2	40.5	37.1	165,750	+0.8
Liberal Democrats	82	13	2	5	▼3	15.5	24.4	109,090	–1.5
Independent	6	1	0	1	▼1	1.2	2.1	9,408	+0.8
Green	28	0	0	0	Steady	0.0	1.3	5,650	+0.5

=== Election of Group Leaders ===
Celia Cameron (St. Stephen) remained leader of the Labour Group, Alison King (Humbleyard) was re-elected leader of the Conservative Group and Stephen Revell (Clavering) was re-elected leader of the Liberal Democratic Group.

=== Election of Leader of the Council ===
Celia Cameron (St. Stephen) the leader of the Labour group was duly elected leader of the council and formed a Labour/Lib Dem administration.

== Division results by local authority ==
=== Breckland ===
Breckland District Summary
Party	Seats	+/-	Votes	%	+/-
Conservative	8	▲1	24,686	39.7	–
Labour	3	Steady	22,899	36.8	+
Liberal Democrats	0	Steady	11,010	17.7	+
Independent	0	▼1	2,285	3.7	+
Green	0	Steady	1,344	2.2	–
Total	11	Steady	62,224	72.4	+
Registered electors			85,996	–	+

Division results

Attleborough
Party	Candidate	Votes	%	±%
Conservative	Alexander Byrne	3,353	47.8	–5.3
Labour	John Williams	2,342	33.4	+4.9
Liberal Democrats	Kelvin Holton	1,316	18.8	+0.3
Majority		1,011	14.4	–10.2
Turnout		7,011	72.0	+37.8
Registered electors		9,736		
Conservative hold		Swing	▼5.1	

Dereham East
Party	Candidate	Votes	%	±%
Labour	Leslie Potter *	2,257	39.6	–6.2
Conservative	Clifton Jordan	2,149	37.7	–0.3
Liberal Democrats	Caroline Rawlings	1,010	17.7	+1.5
Green	Alexander Geddes	285	5.0	N/A
Majority		108	1.9	–5.8
Turnout		5,701	72.1	+33.4
Registered electors		7,909		
Labour hold		Swing	▼3.0	

Dereham West
Party	Candidate	Votes	%	±%
Conservative	Robert Everett	2,410	39.4	–2.1
Labour	Robin Goreham	2,116	34.6	+0.7
Liberal Democrats	Edward Blane	1,103	18.0	+8.6
Green	Jasmine Park	491	8.0	–7.2
Majority		294	4.8	–2.8
Turnout		6,120	70.2	+33.4
Registered electors		8,721		
Conservative hold		Swing	▼1.4	

Elmham & Mattishall
Party	Candidate	Votes	%	±%
Conservative	Ingrid Floering-Blackman *	3,056	50.4	+0.5
Labour	Peter Terry	1,847	30.4	+4.8
Liberal Democrats	Bertram Shelley	863	14.2	–4.7
Green	Janette Sammonds	300	4.9	–0.8
Majority		1,209	19.9	–4.4
Turnout		6,066	75.5	+37.2
Registered electors		8,038		
Conservative hold		Swing	▼2.2	

Guiltcross
Party	Candidate	Votes	%	±%
Conservative	John Baskerville *	2,453	46.0	+1.0
Labour	Anne Hanson	1,883	35.3	+3.6
Liberal Democrats	John Glover	992	18.6	–4.8
Majority		570	10.7	–2.6
Turnout		5,328	74.9	+32.7
Registered electors		7,118		
Conservative hold		Swing	▼1.3	

Necton & Launditch
Party	Candidate	Votes	%	±%
Conservative	John Birkbeck	2,912	48.0	+5.0
Labour	David Holland	2,229	36.8	–7.2
Liberal Democrats	Peter Kane	655	10.8	+1.3
Green	Alison Keidan	268	4.4	+0.9
Majority		683	11.3	N/A
Turnout		6,064	77.9	+29.4
Registered electors		7,789		
Conservative gain from Labour		Swing	▲6.1	

Swaffham
Party	Candidate	Votes	%	±%
Conservative	Kay Mason*	2,389	45.0	–6.1
Labour	George Barnard	2,175	40.9	+7.4
Liberal Democrats	Philip Mitchell	749	14.1	–1.3
Majority		214	4.0	–13.5
Turnout		5,313	72.6	+37.3
Registered electors		7,319		
Conservative hold		Swing	▼6.8	

Thetford East
Party	Candidate	Votes	%	±%
Labour	Colin Armes	2,600	46.1	+9.9
Independent	Terence Lamb *	2,285	40.5	+4.1
Liberal Democrats	John Wilkes	751	13.3	N/A
Majority		315	5.6	N/A
Turnout		5,636	69.8	+37.7
Registered electors		8,073		
Labour gain from Independent		Swing	▲2.9	

Thetford West
Party	Candidate	Votes	%	±%
Labour	Thelma Paines *	2,038	54.5	–16.9
Conservative	Patricia Crick	852	22.8	–5.8
Liberal Democrats	Daniel Jeffrey	850	22.7	N/A
Majority		1,186	31.7	–11.1
Turnout		3,740	64.3	+36.5
Registered electors		5,817		
Labour hold		Swing	▼5.6	

Watton
Party	Candidate	Votes	%	±%
Conservative	John Rogers	2,508	44.5	–7.2
Labour	Jennifer Bullock	1,604	28.5	+9.2
Liberal Democrats	Keith Gilbert	1,523	27.0	–2.0
Majority		904	16.0	–6.8
Turnout		5,635	70.6	+36.6
Registered electors		7,979		
Conservative hold		Swing	▼8.2	

Wissey
Party	Candidate	Votes	%	±%
Conservative	Marion Rix	2,604	46.4	–0.5
Labour	David Curzon-Berners	1,808	32.2	+9.4
Liberal Democrats	Paul Lockyear	1,198	21.4	–8.9
Majority		796	14.2	–2.4
Turnout		5,610	73.5	+37.4
Registered electors		7,497		
Conservative hold		Swing	▼5.0	

=== Broadland ===
Broadland District Summary
Party	Seats	+/-	Votes	%	+/-
Conservative	9	▲1	28,324	40.7	–0.2
Labour	2	▼1	24,154	34.7	+2.4
Liberal Democrats	1	Steady	15,738	22.6	–1.9
Green	0	Steady	864	1.2	+0.8
Independent	0	Steady	434	0.6	–1.4
Total	12	Steady	69,514	76.9	+38.3
Registered electors			90,445	–	+5.9

Division results

Acle
Party	Candidate	Votes	%	±%
Labour	John Smithson	2,118	40.9	+4.8
Conservative	Edward Lees	2,066	39.9	–4.7
Liberal Democrats	Michael Blake	883	17.1	–2.2
Green	Leonard Osmond	109	2.1	N/A
Majority		52	1.0	N/A
Turnout		5,176	76.7	+38.5
Registered electors		6,745		
Labour gain from Conservative		Swing	▲4.8	

Aylsham
Party	Candidate	Votes	%	±%
Conservative	Derek Turnbull	2,308	39.1	+3.8
Labour	Deborah Kemp	2,249	38.1	–12.3
Liberal Democrats	Veronica Beadle	1,186	20.1	+5.8
Green	Stephen Vick	158	2.7	N/A
Majority		59	1.0	N/A
Turnout		5,901	76.3	+33.5
Registered electors		7,731		
Conservative gain from Labour		Swing	▲8.1	

Blofield & Brundall
Party	Candidate	Votes	%	±%
Conservative	Christian Mowle *	2,933	44.1	–10.3
Labour	John Rivers	1,997	30.0	+7.2
Liberal Democrats	Susan Frary	1,581	23.8	+1.0
Green	Nigel Walker	137	2.1	N/A
Majority		936	14.1	–17.5
Turnout		6,648	78.7	+40.0
Registered electors		8,449		
Conservative hold		Swing	▼8.8	

Hellesdon
Party	Candidate	Votes	%	±%
Conservative	Margaret Clarke *	2,050	41.3	+4.1
Labour	John Knowles	1,806	36.4	+0.7
Liberal Democrats	James Elliott	1,106	22.3	–4.8
Majority		244	4.9	+3.4
Turnout		4,962	78.2	+39.1
Registered electors		6,344		
Conservative hold		Swing	▲1.7	

Horsford
Party	Candidate	Votes	%	±%
Conservative	Anthony Adams	1,782	35.4	+3.7
Labour	Pauline Walker	1,638	32.6	+7.8
Liberal Democrats	Alan Young	1,515	30.1	–13.4
Green	Richard Betts	93	1.8	N/A
Majority		144	2.9	N/A
Turnout		5,028	75.2	+39.0
Registered electors		6,688		
Conservative gain from Liberal Democrats		Swing	▼2.1	

Old Catton
Party	Candidate	Votes	%	±%
Conservative	Leslie Austin *	2,576	43.3	–2.8
Labour	Trevor Burrows	2,177	36.6	+8.2
Liberal Democrats	Peter Buckell	1,191	20.0	–5.4
Majority		399	6.7	–11.0
Turnout		5,944	77.3	+43.3
Registered electors		7,694		
Conservative hold		Swing	▼5.4	

Reepham
Party	Candidate	Votes	%	±%
Conservative	Brenda Ravencroft	2,198	42.7	–3.7
Labour	John Mallen	1,638	31.8	+6.4
Liberal Democrats	Simon Woodbridge	1,108	21.5	–1.1
Green	Sirkka Betts	209	4.1	–1.5
Majority		560	10.9	–10.2
Turnout		5,153	77.3	+40.5
Registered electors		6,666		
Conservative hold		Swing	▼5.1	

Sprowston
Party	Candidate	Votes	%	±%
Liberal Democrats	Dalmaine Dewgarde	2,180	36.5	+1.0
Labour	John Wright	2,014	33.7	–4.9
Conservative	Tony Landamore	1,786	29.9	+4.1
Majority		166	2.8	N/A
Turnout		5,980	78.2	+32.9
Registered electors		7,650		
Liberal Democrats gain from Labour		Swing	▲3.0	

Taverham
Party	Candidate	Votes	%	±%
Conservative	Evelyn Collishaw	3,363	42.7	–5.1
Labour	Vernon Pennells	2,370	30.1	+12.7
Liberal Democrats	John Robinson	1,701	21.6	–13.1
Independent	Maura Mould	434	5.5	N/A
Majority		993	12.6	–0.5
Turnout		7,868	76.1	+43.5
Registered electors		10,338		
Conservative hold		Swing	▼8.9	

Thorpe St Andrew
Party	Candidate	Votes	%	±%
Conservative	Rodney Clayton	2,820	43.6	+13.0
Labour	John Cook *	2,463	38.1	–3.5
Liberal Democrats	Justin Barnard	1,178	18.2	+9.6
Majority		357	5.5	N/A
Turnout		6,461	76.5	+30.3
Registered electors		8,446		
Conservative gain from Labour		Swing	▲8.3	

Woodside
Party	Candidate	Votes	%	±%
Labour	Peter Harwood	2,100	39.6	+5.6
Conservative	Robin Marshall *	2,044	38.5	–3.5
Liberal Democrats	Jennifer Clayton	1,164	21.9	–1.6
Majority		56	1.1	N/A
Turnout		5,308	76.7	+41.5
Registered electors		6,921		
Labour gain from Conservative		Swing	▲4.6	

Wroxham
Party	Candidate	Votes	%	±%
Conservative	Timothy Pallister	2,398	47.2	–6.3
Labour	Malcolm Kemp	1,584	31.2	+7.0
Liberal Democrats	Patricia Atkins	945	18.6	–3.7
Green	Ann Bowyer	158	3.1	N/A
Majority		814	16.0	–13.3
Turnout		5,085	75.1	+38.1
Registered electors		6,773		
Conservative hold		Swing	▼6.7	

=== Great Yarmouth ===
Great Yarmouth District Summary
Party	Seats	+/-	Votes	%	+/-
Labour	8	▲3	24,597	51.2	–
Conservative	2	▼3	16,885	35.1	–
Liberal Democrats	0	Steady	6,589	13.7	N/A
Total	10	Steady	48,071	69.3	+
Registered electors			69,402	–	+

Division results

Caister & Great Yarmouth North
Party	Candidate	Votes	%	±%
Labour	Patrick Hacon *	2,355	50.8	–8.8
Conservative	John Getliff	1,708	36.9	–3.5
Liberal Democrats	Anthony Harris	569	12.3	N/A
Majority		647	14.0	–5.1
Turnout		4,632	70.6	+33.7
Registered electors		6,563		
Labour hold		Swing	▼2.7	

East Flegg
Party	Candidate	Votes	%	±%
Conservative	Frank Stuttaford *	2,718	43.4	–13.8
Labour	Leonard Thompson	2,551	40.8	–2.0
Liberal Democrats	Edmee Hurst	991	15.8	N/A
Majority		159	2.7	–11.8
Turnout		6,260	72.9	+40.4
Registered electors		8,587		
Conservative hold		Swing	▼5.9	

Gorleston St Andrews
Party	Candidate	Votes	%	±%
Labour	David Bracey	1,754	43.7	–4.9
Conservative	Godfred Girling *	1,673	41.7	–9.7
Liberal Democrats	Paul Walker	587	14.6	N/A
Majority		81	2.0	N/A
Turnout		4,014	71.3	+33.8
Registered electors		5,627		
Labour gain from Conservative		Swing	▲2.4	

Great Yarmouth Nelson
Party	Candidate	Votes	%	±%
Labour	John Holmes *	2,360	59.5	–6.5
Conservative	Antony Webb	1,145	28.9	–5.1
Liberal Democrats	Michael Tall	461	11.6	N/A
Majority		1,215	30.6	–1.4
Turnout		3,966	60.4	+28.7
Registered electors		6,568		
Labour hold		Swing	▼0.7	

Lothingland East & Magdalen West
Party	Candidate	Votes	%	±%
Labour	Colleen Walker	3,326	57.0	–8.3
Conservative	Andrew Shirland	1,695	29.1	–5.6
Liberal Democrats	Jocelyn Goodey	812	13.9	N/A
Majority		1,631	28.0	–2.6
Turnout		5,833	70.6	+38.0
Registered electors		8,263		
Labour hold		Swing	▼1.4	

Lothingland West
Party	Candidate	Votes	%	±%
Labour	Eric Minnett	3,212	50.1	+1.1
Conservative	Colin Hodds	2,342	36.5	–14.5
Liberal Democrats	Helen Fisken	856	13.4	N/A
Majority		870	13.6	N/A
Turnout		6,410	70.9	+43.5
Registered electors		9,044		
Labour gain from Conservative		Swing	▲7.8	

Magdalen East & Claydon
Party	Candidate	Votes	%	±%
Labour	Anthony Blyth *	2,390	62.9	–9.8
Conservative	John Anniss	994	26.2	–1.1
Liberal Democrats	Margaret Freeman	414	10.9	N/A
Majority		1,396	36.8	–8.5
Turnout		3,798	69.1	+35.6
Registered electors		5,493		
Labour hold		Swing	▼4.3	

Northgate
Party	Candidate	Votes	%	±%
Labour	David Gall *	1,693	56.7	–4.0
Conservative	Joy Coasitis	939	31.5	–7.8
Liberal Democrats	Angela Tall	352	11.8	N/A
Majority		754	25.3	+3.9
Turnout		2,984	65.7	+36.5
Registered electors		4,545		
Labour hold		Swing	▲1.9	

Southtown & Cobholm
Party	Candidate	Votes	%	±%
Labour	Michael Castle *	2,613	58.0	–12.2
Conservative	Gloria Doyle	1,233	27.3	–2.5
Liberal Democrats	Deborah Skevington	663	14.7	N/A
Majority		1,380	30.6	–9.7
Turnout		4,509	66.0	+37.8
Registered electors		6,837		
Labour hold		Swing	▼4.9	

West Flegg
Party	Candidate	Votes	%	±%
Conservative	James Shrimplin	2,438	43.0	–13.7
Labour	Lee Sutton	2,343	41.4	–2.2
Liberal Democrats	Philip Matthew	884	15.6	N/A
Majority		95	1.7	–9.8
Turnout		5,575	71.9	+40.2
Registered electors		7,875		
Conservative hold		Swing	▼5.8	

=== King's Lynn and West Norfolk ===
King's Lynn & West Norfolk District Summary
Party	Seats	+/-	Votes	%	+/-
Conservative	10	▲2	31,138	41.3	+
Labour	4	Steady	30,980	41.1	+
Liberal Democrats	0	▼2	13,289	17.6	–
Total	14	Steady	75,407	72.5	
Registered electors			104,037	–	

Division results

Dersingham
Party	Candidate	Votes	%	±%
Conservative	George Pratt*	2,249	35.8	–3.2
Liberal Democrats	Paul Burall	2,044	32.5	–5.7
Labour	Carol Tilbury	1,994	31.7	+8.9
Majority		205	3.3	+2.5
Turnout		6,287	78.2	+33.3
Registered electors		8,041		
Conservative hold		Swing	▲1.3	

Docking
Party	Candidate	Votes	%	±%
Conservative	Stephen Bett *	2,543	48.9	–1.4
Labour	James Mitchell	1,791	34.5	+1.1
Liberal Democrats	Christopher Miller-Yardley	864	16.6	+0.4
Majority		752	14.5	–2.5
Turnout		5,198	69.3	+30.4
Registered electors		7,500		
Conservative hold		Swing	▼1.3	

Downham Market
Party	Candidate	Votes	%	±%
Conservative	David Forgan	2,612	48.0	–2.8
Labour	Martin Stewart	2,093	38.5	+3.8
Liberal Democrats	Wendy Thorne	737	13.5	+3.0
Majority		519	9.5	–6.6
Turnout		5,442	74.2	+37.6
Registered electors		7,339		
Conservative hold		Swing	▼3.3	

Feltwell
Party	Candidate	Votes	%	±%
Conservative	James Norris	1,978	39.4	+3.1
Liberal Democrats	David Buckton *	1,618	32.2	–16.6
Labour	William Scott	1,430	28.5	+13.6
Majority		360	7.2	N/A
Turnout		5,026	72.6	+34.5
Registered electors		6,785		
Conservative gain from Liberal Democrats		Swing	▲9.9	

Fincham
Party	Candidate	Votes	%	±%
Conservative	Richard Rockcliffe *	2,568	48.0	+6.0
Labour	Charles Joyce	2,018	37.7	+21.6
Liberal Democrats	Geoffrey Avery	761	14.2	–27.6
Majority		550	10.3	+10.1
Turnout		5,347	74.4	+35.2
Registered electors		7,184		
Conservative hold		Swing	▼7.8	

Freebridge Lynn
Party	Candidate	Votes	%	±%
Conservative	Gordon Dawes	3,140	46.2	–2.1
Labour	Clifford Walters	2,203	32.4	+12.5
Liberal Democrats	Matthew Farthing	1,455	21.4	–10.4
Majority		937	13.8	–2.8
Turnout		6,798	76.9	+34.1
Registered electors		8,839		
Conservative hold		Swing	▼7.3	

Gaywood North & Central
Party	Candidate	Votes	%	±%
Labour	Antony Luckett	2,955	47.1	–1.1
Conservative	Guy Wathen	2,176	34.7	–3.1
Liberal Democrats	David Parish	1,139	18.2	+4.2
Majority		779	12.4	+2.0
Turnout		6,270	72.1	+37.9
Registered electors		8,698		
Labour hold		Swing	▲1.0	

Gaywood South
Party	Candidate	Votes	%	±%
Labour	William Davison*	2,156	66.4	–4.9
Conservative	Deryk Maddox	699	21.5	+2.8
Liberal Democrats	Nicole Farthing	391	12.0	+2.0
Majority		1,457	44.9	–7.8
Turnout		3,246	66.1	+37.0
Registered electors		4,911		
Labour hold		Swing	▼3.9	

Hunstanton
Party	Candidate	Votes	%	±%
Conservative	John Lambert *	2,991	48.3	+1.5
Labour	Paul Cobb	2,504	40.4	–3.1
Liberal Democrats	Edward Maxfield	696	11.2	+1.5
Majority		487	7.9	+4.5
Turnout		6,191	71.9	+29.2
Registered electors		8,609		
Conservative hold		Swing	▲2.3	

King's Lynn North & Central
Party	Candidate	Votes	%	±%
Labour	John Donaldson*	2,823	67.4	–3.6
Conservative	Kevin Fletcher	963	23.0	+2.0
Liberal Democrats	Alexandra Kampouropoulos	405	9.7	+1.8
Majority		1,860	44.4	–5.6
Turnout		4,191	65.7	+35.0
Registered electors		6,382		
Labour hold		Swing	▼2.8	

King's Lynn South
Party	Candidate	Votes	%	±%
Labour	Bryan Seaman *	2,311	56.5	–12.8
Conservative	Clair Garrod	1,099	26.9	+5.4
Liberal Democrats	Paul Brandon	681	16.6	+7.4
Majority		1,212	29.6	–18.2
Turnout		4,091	69.5	+35.3
Registered electors		5,744		
Labour hold		Swing	▼9.1	

Marshland North
Party	Candidate	Votes	%	±%
Conservative	Anthony Wright	2,380	38.6	+5.6
Labour	Alan Munden	2,104	34.1	+15.4
Liberal Democrats	Keith Bourne	1,686	27.3	–21.0
Majority		276	4.5	N/A
Turnout		6,170	72.6	+41.0
Registered electors		8,498		
Conservative gain from Liberal Democrats		Swing	▼4.9	

Marshland South
Party	Candidate	Votes	%	±%
Conservative	Harry Humphrey *	2,989	53.5	+1.5
Labour	Jack Bantoft	2,602	46.5	+11.0
Majority		387	6.9	–9.6
Turnout		5,591	69.8	+40.9
Registered electors		8,005		
Conservative hold		Swing	▼4.8	

Winch
Party	Candidate	Votes	%	±%
Conservative	Heather Bolt *	2,751	49.5	+2.4
Labour	Lawrence Wilkinson	1,996	35.9	+4.0
Liberal Democrats	Philippa Gray	812	14.6	–2.6
Majority		755	13.6	–1.6
Turnout		5,559	74.1	+38.0
Registered electors		7,502		
Conservative hold		Swing	▼0.8	

=== North Norfolk ===
North Norfolk District Summary
Party	Seats	+/-	Votes	%	+/-
Labour	4	Steady	15,984	27.7	–4.8
Liberal Democrats	3	Steady	16,340	28.3	–2.9
Conservative	2	Steady	16,879	29.3	–2.5
Independent	1	Steady	6,689	11.6	+7.4
Green	0	Steady	1,781	3.1	+2.8
Total	10	Steady	57,673	73.9	+27.7
Registered electors			78,050	–	+3.6

Division results

Cromer
Party	Candidate	Votes	%	±%
Conservative	Laurence Randall	2,435	43.0	+1.5
Liberal Democrats	Harry Noble	1,873	33.0	–2.5
Labour	Irene Bowman	1,163	20.5	+0.6
Green	Peter Crouch	198	3.5	+0.3
Majority		562	9.9	+3.9
Turnout		5,669	72.0	+30.0
Registered electors		7,878		
Conservative hold		Swing	▲2.0	

Erpingham & Melton Constable
Party	Candidate	Votes	%	±%
Labour	Aubrey Poberefsky	2,165	41.3	–15.5
Conservative	Courtenay Warner	1,756	33.5	+2.7
Liberal Democrats	John Pike	1,192	22.8	+10.4
Green	Rupert Rosser	125	2.4	N/A
Majority		409	7.8	–18.2
Turnout		5,238	75.8	+24.2
Registered electors		6,912		
Labour hold		Swing	▼9.1	

Fakenham
Party	Candidate	Votes	%	±%
Labour	David Callaby	2,037	36.8	–17.0
Independent	Dennis Parsons *	1,937	35.0	N/A
Conservative	Charles Fountaine	1,369	24.7	–8.5
Green	Allen O'Keefe	195	3.5	N/A
Majority		100	1.8	–18.8
Turnout		5,538	70.9	+30.7
Registered electors		7,816		
Labour hold		Swing		

Holt
Party	Candidate	Votes	%	±%
Liberal Democrats	William Cooke *	2,217	39.8	–13.5
Conservative	Susan Freeman	2,158	38.7	+1.7
Labour	Anthony Aberdein	1,034	18.6	+8.9
Green	Janet Thompson	163	2.9	N/A
Majority		59	1.1	–15.2
Turnout		5,572	74.9	+21.1
Registered electors		7,438		
Liberal Democrats hold		Swing	▼7.6	

Mundesley
Party	Candidate	Votes	%	±%
Liberal Democrats	Peter Baldwin *	2,409	39.7	–18.0
Conservative	Wyndham Northam	2,049	33.8	+3.4
Labour	Edwin Stonestreet	1,308	21.6	+9.7
Green	Carole Lomax	295	4.9	N/A
Majority		360	5.9	–21.3
Turnout		6,061	74.7	+26.0
Registered electors		8,118		
Liberal Democrats hold		Swing	▼10.7	

North Smallburgh
Party	Candidate	Votes	%	±%
Labour	Sheila Cullingham	2,260	39.6	–13.9
Liberal Democrats	Catherine Wilkins	1,686	29.6	+17.1
Independent	Peter Blaxell	1,510	26.5	N/A
Green	Dora Higginbottom	248	4.3	N/A
Majority		574	10.1	–9.4
Turnout		5,704	70.8	+25.6
Registered electors		8,057		
Labour hold		Swing	▼15.5	

North Walsham
Party	Candidate	Votes	%	±%
Labour	Martin Booth *	2,537	37.1	–11.3
Conservative	Rita Rose	2,443	35.7	+7.5
Liberal Democrats	Jason Myhill	1,629	23.8	+0.4
Green	Joanna Chitty	231	3.4	N/A
Majority		94	1.4	–18.9
Turnout		6,840	73.2	+30.9
Registered electors		9,349		
Labour hold		Swing	▼9.4	

Sheringham
Party	Candidate	Votes	%	±%
Liberal Democrats	Margaret Craske *	2,808	44.9	–13.3
Conservative	Danny Rowe	2,237	35.8	+1.4
Labour	Patricia Harding	1,012	16.2	+8.8
Green	Rupert Eris	190	3.0	N/A
Majority		1,225	9.1	–14.8
Turnout		6,247	75.2	+27.6
Registered electors		8,310		
Liberal Democrats hold		Swing	▼7.4	

South Smallburgh
Party	Candidate	Votes	%	±%
Conservative	Leslie Mogford *	2,432	43.4	–8.6
Labour	William Pike	1,253	22.4	–11.0
Liberal Democrats	Stephanie Harrison	1,047	18.7	+4.1
Independent	Godfrey Wise	731	13.1	N/A
Green	Karl Greenwood	136	2.4	N/A
Majority		1,179	21.1	+2.5
Turnout		5,599	76.0	+34.9
Registered electors		7,363		
Conservative hold		Swing	▲1.2	

Wells
Party	Candidate	Votes	%	±%
Independent	Graham Ashworth *	2,511	48.2	+7.0
Liberal Democrats	Antony Groom	1,479	28.4	+6.1
Labour	Denis Woods	1,216	23.4	–13.0
Majority		1,032	19.8	+15.0
Turnout		5,206	76.5	+24.6
Registered electors		6,809		
Independent hold		Swing	▲0.5	

=== Norwich ===
Norwich District Summary
Party	Seats	+/-	Votes	%	+/-
Labour	13	▲1	33,820	49.9	–3.1
Liberal Democrats	3	Steady	18,714	27.6	–0.4
Conservative	0	▼1	14,088	20.8	+2.8
Green	0	Steady	1,162	1.7	+0.6
Total	16	Steady	67,784	72.1	+32.4
Registered electors			93,964	–	–0.7

Division results

Bowthorpe
Party	Candidate	Votes	%	±%
Labour	Josephine Britton *	3,052	56.3	–9.2
Liberal Democrats	Nigel Lubbock	1,132	20.9	+7.6
Conservative	Christopher Cox	1,072	19.8	+2.1
Green	Susan Pollard	163	3.0	–0.5
Majority		1,920	35.4	–12.4
Turnout		5,419	64.9	+33.8
Registered electors		8,348		
Labour hold		Swing	▼8.4	

Catton Grove
Party	Candidate	Votes	%	±%
Labour	Brian Morrey	2,073	56.8	–5.0
Conservative	Peter Kearney	904	24.8	+1.1
Liberal Democrats	Simon Richardson	675	18.5	+4.0
Majority		1,169	32.0	–6.1
Turnout		3,652	67.2	+37.8
Registered electors		5,437		
Labour hold		Swing	▼3.1	

Coslany
Party	Candidate	Votes	%	±%
Labour	Catherine Ward *	2,334	55.0	–9.2
Conservative	Ernest Horth	1,016	23.9	+2.6
Liberal Democrats	Ian Williams	896	21.1	+6.6
Majority		1,318	31.0	–11.9
Turnout		4,246	72.4	+35.4
Registered electors		5,861		
Labour hold		Swing	▼5.9	

Crome
Party	Candidate	Votes	%	±%
Labour	Joan Fowler	3,355	64.8	–1.5
Conservative	John Fisher	1,089	21.0	+2.5
Liberal Democrats	Paul Young	732	14.1	–1.2
Majority		2,266	43.8	–4.0
Turnout		5,176	94.8	+57.6
Registered electors		5,461		
Labour hold		Swing	▼2.0	

Eaton
Party	Candidate	Votes	%	±%
Liberal Democrats	Gordon Dean	2,173	41.2	+17.4
Conservative	Bernard Wells	1,905	36.1	–12.2
Labour	Charles Slorach	1,192	22.6	–5.3
Majority		268	5.1	N/A
Turnout		5,270	81.2	+30.0
Registered electors		6,490		
Liberal Democrats gain from Conservative		Swing	▲14.8	

Heigham
Party	Candidate	Votes	%	±%
Labour	John Sheppard*	2,116	55.2	+3.5
Liberal Democrats	Donna Aalders-Dunthorne	1,058	27.6	–13.3
Conservative	Graham Drake	658	17.2	+9.7
Majority		1,058	27.6	+16.8
Turnout		3,832	68.8	+27.8
Registered electors		5,572		
Labour hold		Swing	▲8.4	

Henderson
Party	Candidate	Votes	%	±%
Labour	Harriet Panting	2,123	56.1	–14.2
Liberal Democrats	Patricia Meacock	819	21.6	+6.3
Conservative	James Knight	638	16.9	+2.5
Green	Ross Nockles	205	5.4	N/A
Majority		1,304	34.5	–20.5
Turnout		3,785	66.8	+35.7
Registered electors		5,665		
Labour hold		Swing	▼10.3	

Lakenham
Party	Candidate	Votes	%	±%
Labour	Penelope Ross *	2,023	52.3	–13.1
Liberal Democrats	Yvonne Barnes	1,105	28.5	+12.9
Conservative	Sandra Collier	743	19.2	+0.2
Majority		918	23.7	–22.7
Turnout		3,871	69.6	+33.4
Registered electors		5,564		
Labour hold		Swing	▼13.0	

Mancroft
Party	Candidate	Votes	%	±%
Labour	Lloyd Addison*	2,051	48.2	–13.5
Conservative	Michael Utting	1,009	23.7	+0.7
Liberal Democrats	Cedric Risebrook	940	22.1	+6.8
Green	Adrian Holmes	253	5.9	N/A
Majority		1,042	24.5	–14.3
Turnout		4,253	65.1	+29.8
Registered electors		6,531		
Labour hold		Swing	▼7.1	

Mile Cross
Party	Candidate	Votes	%	±%
Labour	Andrew Panes *	2,434	68.0	+5.0
Liberal Democrats	Ian Bond	595	16.6	–10.3
Conservative	Stanley Rendall	551	15.4	+5.3
Majority		1,839	51.4	+15.3
Turnout		3,580	68.2	+38.3
Registered electors		5,247		
Labour hold		Swing	▲7.7	

Mousehold
Party	Candidate	Votes	%	±%
Labour	Peter Buttle*	2,439	57.3	–11.3
Conservative	Peter Bowyer	878	20.6	+6.5
Liberal Democrats	Joy Lloyd	763	17.9	+6.5
Green	Lesley Moore	173	4.1	–1.8
Majority		1,561	36.7	–17.8
Turnout		4,253	70.9	+39.0
Registered electors		6,003		
Labour hold		Swing	▼8.9	

Nelson
Party	Candidate	Votes	%	±%
Labour	John Garrett	1,866	45.4	+5.4
Liberal Democrats	Adrian Warnes*	1,433	34.8	–17.5
Conservative	John Turner	582	14.1	+6.4
Green	Sarah Pennington	233	5.7	N/A
Majority		433	10.5	N/A
Turnout		4,114	76.1	+20.3
Registered electors		5,404		
Labour gain from Liberal Democrats		Swing	▲11.5	

St Stephen
Party	Candidate	Votes	%	±%
Labour	Celia Cameron *	1,901	47.0	–12.1
Conservative	Michael Dewings	1,156	28.6	+5.1
Liberal Democrats	Denise Wollterton	991	24.5	+11.5
Majority		745	18.4	–17.2
Turnout		4,048	73.9	+27.8
Registered electors		5,480		
Labour hold		Swing	▼8.6	

Thorpe Hamlet
Party	Candidate	Votes	%	±%
Liberal Democrats	Barbara Hacker *	1,746	43.4	–13.4
Labour	John Bennett	1,674	41.6	+13.3
Conservative	Richard Sumner	606	15.1	+4.5
Majority		72	1.8	–26.7
Turnout		4,026	69.5	+30.0
Registered electors		5,791		
Liberal Democrats hold		Swing	▼13.4	

Town Close
Party	Candidate	Votes	%	±%
Liberal Democrats	Colin Harper *	2,028	48.6	–4.1
Labour	William Carpenter	1,471	35.2	–2.6
Conservative	John Wyatt	676	16.2	+6.7
Majority		557	13.3	–1.5
Turnout		4,175	74.7	+18.3
Registered electors		5,457		
Liberal Democrats hold		Swing	▼0.8	

University
Party	Candidate	Votes	%	±%
Labour	George Turner *	1,716	42.0	–7.0
Liberal Democrats	Jane Rooza	1,628	39.9	–0.4
Conservative	Christine Page	605	14.8	+4.1
Green	Michelle Valentine	135	3.3	N/A
Majority		88	2.2	–6.4
Turnout		4,084	72.2	+18.0
Registered electors		5,653		
Labour hold		Swing	▼3.2	

=== South Norfolk ===
South Norfolk District Summary
Party	Seats	+/-	Votes	%	+/-
Liberal Democrats	6	▼1	27,410	41.6	–3.9
Conservative	5	▲1	24,719	37.5	–0.1
Labour	0	Steady	13,316	20.2	+4.2
Green	0	Steady	499	0.8	–0.1
Total	11	Steady	65,944	76.9	'+31.6
Registered electors			85,795	–	+3.1

Division results

Clavering
Party	Candidate	Votes	%	±%
Liberal Democrats	Stephen Revell *	2,739	47.5	–10.5
Conservative	Terence Jones	1,738	30.1	+0.6
Labour	Stephen Pank	1,288	22.3	+9.8
Majority		1,001	17.4	–11.1
Turnout		5,765	77.8	+31.7
Registered electors		7,410		
Liberal Democrats hold		Swing	▼5.6	

Costessey
Party	Candidate	Votes	%	±%
Liberal Democrats	Tim East	2,790	48.3	–11.2
Conservative	David Perkins	1,704	29.5	+2.0
Labour	Julian Swainson	1,285	22.2	+9.3
Majority		1,086	18.8	–13.2
Turnout		5,779	72.9	+26.8
Registered electors		7,929		
Liberal Democrats hold		Swing	▼6.6	

Diss
Party	Candidate	Votes	%	±%
Liberal Democrats	Jill Caldwell	3,320	52.5	+9.8
Conservative	Allan Butler	1,916	30.3	–0.3
Labour	Iris Larkin	1,090	17.2	–9.5
Majority		1,404	22.2	+10.2
Turnout		6,326	71.8	+31.0
Registered electors		8,809		
Liberal Democrats hold		Swing	▲5.1	

East Depwade
Party	Candidate	Votes	%	±%
Conservative	Ronald Johnson	2,419	39.5	+3.1
Liberal Democrats	Adrian Brownsea *	2,317	37.8	–13.3
Labour	Lawrence Larkin	1,392	22.7	+14.9
Majority		102	1.7	N/A
Turnout		6,128	76.0	+30.6
Registered electors		8,064		
Conservative gain from Liberal Democrats		Swing	▲8.2	

Henstead
Party	Candidate	Votes	%	±%
Conservative	Graham Hemming *	2,220	38.8	–6.6
Liberal Democrats	Rosemary Watts	2,040	35.7	+0.8
Labour	Janet King	1,231	21.5	+5.0
Green	Ingo Wagenknecht	226	4.0	+0.9
Majority		180	3.1	–7.3
Turnout		5,717	79.8	+34.2
Registered electors		7,169		
Conservative hold		Swing	▼3.7	

Hingham
Party	Candidate	Votes	%	±%
Liberal Democrats	Jeremy Dore *	2,346	45.4	–5.8
Conservative	Jonathan Daniels	1,836	35.6	–0.9
Labour	Sheila Urquhart	980	19.0	+6.7
Majority		510	9.9	–8.1
Turnout		5,162	78.1	+29.7
Registered electors		6,608		
Liberal Democrats hold		Swing	▼3.4	

Humbleyard
Party	Candidate	Votes	%	±%
Conservative	Alison King *	2,554	44.0	–2.3
Liberal Democrats	Penelope Hollingham	2,337	40.2	–5.8
Labour	Steven Sewell	820	14.1	+6.4
Green	Roy Walmsley	99	1.7	N/A
Majority		217	3.7	+3.4
Turnout		5,810	79.4	+30.5
Registered electors		7,322		
Conservative hold		Swing	▲1.8	

Loddon
Party	Candidate	Votes	%	±%
Conservative	Adrian Gunson *	3,667	62.0	–0.6
Labour	William McCloughan	1,086	18.4	–0.3
Liberal Democrats	Margaret McPhee	986	16.7	–1.9
Green	J. Hutchings	174	2.9	N/A
Majority		2,581	43.6	–0.3
Turnout		5,913	79.2	+26.8
Registered electors		7,462		
Conservative hold		Swing	▼0.2	

Long Stratton
Party	Candidate	Votes	%	±%
Liberal Democrats	Edward Littler *	3,077	52.3	–11.6
Conservative	John Ellis	1,731	29.4	+3.1
Labour	Grace Aitken	1,077	18.3	+8.5
Majority		1,346	22.9	–14.7
Turnout		5,885	78.1	+31.4
Registered electors		7,535		
Liberal Democrats hold		Swing	▼7.4	

West Depwade
Party	Candidate	Votes	%	±%
Conservative	Neville Chapman *	2,787	42.8	–2.9
Liberal Democrats	Bodo Rissmann	2,609	40.1	+0.4
Labour	Brian Whall	1,115	17.1	+2.5
Majority		178	2.7	–3.3
Turnout		6,511	78.3	+38.0
Registered electors		8,312		
Conservative hold		Swing	▼1.7	

Wymondham
Party	Candidate	Votes	%	±%
Liberal Democrats	Diana Hockaday *	2,849	41.0	+1.5
Conservative	Hugh Tracy-Forster	2,147	30.9	+4.3
Labour	Richard Barber	1,952	28.1	–3.8
Majority		702	10.1	+2.6
Turnout		6,948	75.7	+28.5
Registered electors		9,175		
Liberal Democrats hold		Swing	▼1.4	
