= 1985 Norfolk County Council election =

1985 English local election

← 1981	2 May 1985	1989 →

All 84 seats to Norfolk County Council 43 seats needed for a majority
- Registered: 551,948
- Turnout: 41.9%

	First party	Second party	Third party
Party	Conservative	Labour	Alliance
Last election	51 seats, 44.0%	27 seats, 40.3%	4 seats, 13.7%
Seats won	44	25	15
Seat change	▼7	▼2	▲11
Popular vote	92,384	74,581	62,028
Percentage	40.0%	32.3%	26.8%
Swing	▼4.0%	▼8.0%	▲13.1%
Council control before election
Conservative
Council control after election
Conservative

The 1985 Norfolk County Council election took place on 2 May 1985 to elect members of Norfolk County Council in Norfolk, England. This was on the same day as other local elections.

== Summary ==
=== Election result ===
1985 Norfolk County Council election
Party	Candidates	Seats	Gains	Losses	Net gain/loss	Seats %	Votes %	Votes	+/−
Conservative	84	44	2	2	▼7	52.4	40.0	92,384	–4.0
Labour	84	25	1	5	▼2	29.8	32.3	74,581	–8.0
Alliance	80	15	4	0	▲11	17.9	26.8	62,028	+13.1
Independent	3	0	0	0	▼1	0.0	0.6	1,430	–1.0
Ind. Conservative	1	0	0	0	Steady	0.0	0.2	483	N/A
Ecology	1	0	0	0	Steady	0.0	0.1	187	–0.3

== Division results by local authority ==
=== Breckland ===
Breckland District Summary
Party	Seats	+/-	Votes	%	+/-
Conservative	8		13,501	47.5	
Labour	3		9,341	32.9	
Alliance	0		4,921	17.3	
Independent	0		640	2.3	
Total	11		28,403	38.8	
Registered electors			73,160	–	

Division results

Attleborough
Party	Candidate	Votes	%	±%
Conservative	John Alston *	1,549	54.5	+5.1
Labour	W. Cudd	656	23.1	–4.6
Alliance	E. Serpell	635	22.4	–0.5
Majority		893	31.4	+9.7
Turnout		2,840	37.5	–2.9
Registered electors		7,567		
Conservative hold		Swing	▲4.9	

Dereham East
Party	Candidate	Votes	%
Labour	Leslie Potter*	1,230	44.3
Conservative	M. Fanthorpe	1,133	40.8
Alliance	E. Howlett	412	14.8
Majority		97	3.5
Turnout		2,775	38.4
Registered electors		7,224	
Labour win (new seat)			

Dereham West
Party	Candidate	Votes	%
Conservative	M. Dulgan	1,350	56.3
Labour	S. Nurse	1,046	43.7
Majority		304	12.7
Turnout		2,396	36.3
Registered electors		6,595	
Conservative win (new seat)			

Elmham & Mattishall
Party	Candidate	Votes	%
Conservative	D. Alston	1,608	59.2
Alliance	R. Brand	656	24.2
Labour	N. Peake	451	16.6
Majority		952	35.1
Turnout		2,715	37.2
Registered electors		7,289	
Conservative win (new seat)			

Guiltcross
Party	Candidate	Votes	%
Conservative	Peter Rollin *	1,272	49.6
Labour	C. Phillips	754	29.4
Alliance	M. Rouse	541	21.1
Majority		518	20.2
Turnout		2,567	40.9
Registered electors		6,271	
Conservative win (new seat)			

Necton & Launditch
Party	Candidate	Votes	%
Conservative	J. Birkbeck*	1,657	55.3
Labour	P. Carter	851	28.4
Alliance	A. Moore	488	16.3
Majority		806	26.9
Turnout		2,996	41.9
Registered electors		7,142	
Conservative win (new seat)			

Swaffham
Party	Candidate	Votes	%	±%
Conservative	T. Wilding*	1,198	46.6	+2.4
Labour	M. Boddy	1,030	40.1	+2.4
Alliance	F. Attfield	343	13.3	–4.9
Majority		168	6.5	±0.0
Turnout		2,571	40.6	–5.3
Registered electors		6,327		
Conservative hold		Swing	0.0	

Thetford East
Party	Candidate	Votes	%
Labour	J. Ramm*	933	33.0
Conservative	L. Frost	888	31.5
Independent	T. Lamb	577	20.4
Alliance	J. Fadden	425	15.1
Majority		45	1.6
Turnout		2,823	37.5
Registered electors		7,519	
Labour win (new seat)			

Thetford West
Party	Candidate	Votes	%
Labour	T. Paines	1,013	45.6
Alliance	D. Jeffrey*	698	31.4
Conservative	F. Wilkes	510	23.0
Majority		315	14.2
Turnout		2,221	38.2
Registered electors		5,808	
Labour win (new seat)			

Watton
Party	Candidate	Votes	%	±%
Conservative	G. Mitchell	1,687	63.7	+10.0
Alliance	P. Barber	474	17.9	+2.4
Labour	C. Lindsay	425	16.0	+4.3
Independent	R. Borland	63	2.4	N/A
Majority		1,213	45.8	+11.2
Turnout		2,649	40.7	–0.7
Registered electors		6,503		
Conservative hold		Swing	▲3.8	

Wissey
Party	Candidate	Votes	%
Conservative	S. Steward*	1,414	51.8
Alliance	R. Green	690	25.3
Labour	G. Holding	624	22.9
Majority		724	26.5
Turnout		2,728	40.5
Registered electors		6,737	
Conservative win (new seat)			

=== Broadland ===
Broadland District Summary
Party	Seats	+/-	Votes	%	+/-
Conservative	8		14,341	45.3	
Alliance	4		10,271	32.4	
Labour	0		7,068	22.3	
Total	12		31,680	41.1	
Registered electors			77,134	–	

Division results

Acle
Party	Candidate	Votes	%
Conservative	R. Chase	1,156	54.0
Labour	P. Morgan	554	25.9
Alliance	A. Greenhaigh	430	20.1
Majority		602	28.1
Turnout		2,140	37.9
Registered electors		5,649	
Conservative win (new seat)			

Aylsham
Party	Candidate	Votes	%	±%
Conservative	F. Roualle*	1,142	48.3	–4.7
Labour	E. Woodley	659	27.9	–19.1
Alliance	R. Fowkes	563	23.8	N/A
Majority		483	20.4	+14.4
Turnout		2,364	34.5	–12.7
Registered electors		6,848		
Conservative hold		Swing	▲7.2	

Blofield & Brundall
Party	Candidate	Votes	%
Conservative	J. Mack *	1,407	50.4
Alliance	I. Williams	785	28.1
Labour	J. Curran	600	21.5
Majority		622	22.3
Turnout		2,792	37.5
Registered electors		7,445	
Conservative win (new seat)			

Hellesdon
Party	Candidate	Votes	%
Alliance	P. Balcombe	1,141	37.4
Conservative	A. Mackay *	1,055	34.6
Labour	P. Watson	857	28.1
Majority		86	2.8
Turnout		3,053	45.7
Registered electors		6,677	
Alliance win (new seat)			

Horsford
Party	Candidate	Votes	%
Alliance	B. Shaw	975	41.7
Conservative	G. Godfrey *	830	35.5
Labour	D. Fullman	535	22.9
Majority		145	6.2
Turnout		2,340	39.8
Registered electors		5,874	
Alliance win (new seat)			

Old Catton
Party	Candidate	Votes	%
Conservative	L. Austin	1,198	48.3
Alliance	S. Bidgood	803	32.4
Labour	R. Bounden	480	19.3
Majority		395	15.9
Turnout		2,481	37.1
Registered electors		6,687	
Conservative win (new seat)			

Reepham
Party	Candidate	Votes	%	±%
Conservative	S. Marshall*	1,269	48.9	+4.0
Alliance	G. Graham	860	33.1	N/A
Labour	C. Jeffrey	468	18.0	–37.1
Majority		409	15.7	N/A
Turnout		2,597	44.7	–10.6
Registered electors		5,810		
Conservative gain from Labour		Swing		

Sprowston
Party	Candidate	Votes	%
Alliance	A. Young	1,192	34.6
Labour	K. Lashley	1,129	32.8
Conservative	A. Hood *	1,123	32.6
Majority		63	1.8
Turnout		3,444	46.2
Registered electors		7,447	
Alliance win (new seat)			

Taverham
Party	Candidate	Votes	%
Alliance	J. Robinson	1,284	47.6
Conservative	D. Barnes	1,164	43.2
Labour	J. Claridge	249	9.2
Majority		120	4.4
Turnout		2,697	47.8
Registered electors		5,640	
Alliance win (new seat)			

Thorpe St Andrew
Party	Candidate	Votes	%
Conservative	A. Watts*	1,466	54.0
Alliance	J. Swallow	666	24.5
Labour	R. Duhig	583	21.5
Majority		800	29.5
Turnout		2,715	40.8
Registered electors		6,655	
Conservative win (new seat)			

Woodside
Party	Candidate	Votes	%
Conservative	L. Woolf	1,106	45.7
Alliance	P. Allison	738	30.5
Labour	D. Rothery	578	23.9
Majority		368	15.2
Turnout		2,422	39.5
Registered electors		6,134	
Conservative win (new seat)			

Wroxham
Party	Candidate	Votes	%
Conservative	J. Peel*	1,426	54.1
Alliance	D. Reeves	834	31.6
Labour	P. Willison	376	14.3
Majority		592	22.5
Turnout		2,636	42.1
Registered electors		6,268	
Conservative win (new seat)			

=== Great Yarmouth ===
Great Yarmouth District Summary
Party	Seats	+/-	Votes	%	+/-
Labour	6		8,361	40.2	
Conservative	2		7,649	36.8	
Alliance	2		4,764	22.9	
Total	10		20,774	34.8	
Registered electors			59,661	–	

Division results

Caister & Great Yarmouth North
Party	Candidate	Votes	%
Labour	P. Hacon	1,186	46.1
Conservative	E. White	1,092	42.4
Alliance	S. Andrews	297	11.5
Majority		94	3.7
Turnout		2,575	40.6
Registered electors		6,335	
Labour win (new seat)			

East Flegg
Party	Candidate	Votes	%
Conservative	F. Stuttaford	1,130	54.7
Labour	P. Baker	493	23.9
Alliance	P. Townsend	444	21.5
Majority		637	30.8
Turnout		2,067	30.2
Registered electors		6,837	
Conservative win (new seat)			

Gorleston St Andrews
Party	Candidate	Votes	%
Conservative	P. Green*	941	50.3
Labour	B. Baughan	604	32.3
Alliance	E. Foster	326	17.4
Majority		337	18.0
Turnout		1,871	32.5
Registered electors		5,760	
Conservative win (new seat)			

Great Yarmouth Nelson
Party	Candidate	Votes	%
Labour	D. Maddeys	1,243	53.9
Conservative	E. Lees	828	35.9
Alliance	P. Larson	234	10.2
Majority		415	18.0
Turnout		2,305	35.5
Registered electors		6,499	
Labour win (new seat)			

Lothingland East & Magdalen West
Party	Candidate	Votes	%
Labour	C. Burrows	1,385	57.9
Conservative	R. Quartley	581	24.3
Alliance	L. Gordon	427	17.8
Majority		804	33.6
Turnout		2,393	35.6
Registered electors		6,731	
Labour win (new seat)			

Lothingland West
Party	Candidate	Votes	%
Alliance	B. Callan	1,052	46.0
Conservative	L. Gage	829	36.2
Labour	P. Mason	407	17.8
Majority		223	9.7
Turnout		2,288	30.4
Registered electors		7,514	
Alliance win (new seat)			

Magdalen East & Claydon
Party	Candidate	Votes	%
Labour	G. Hayes*	1,210	60.6
Conservative	R. Symonds	486	24.3
Alliance	B. Hellingsworth	301	15.1
Majority		724	36.3
Turnout		1,997	33.3
Registered electors		5,995	
Labour win (new seat)			

Northgate
Party	Candidate	Votes	%
Labour	N. Suanders*	952	51.5
Conservative	R. Procter	649	35.1
Alliance	A. Pearson	249	13.5
Majority		303	16.4
Turnout		1,850	37.6
Registered electors		4,914	
Labour win (new seat)			

Southtown & Cobholm
Party	Candidate	Votes	%
Labour	F. Stone*	1,350	60.8
Conservative	J. Permenter	579	26.1
Alliance	W. Nicholson	291	13.1
Majority		771	34.7
Turnout		2,220	31.1
Registered electors		7,128	
Labour win (new seat)			

West Flegg
Party	Candidate	Votes	%	±%
Alliance	R. Tingey	1,392	45.5	+11.0
Conservative	Michael Carttiss *	1,183	38.7	–4.0
Labour	R. Hudson	483	15.8	–7.0
Majority		209	6.8	N/A
Turnout		3,058	44.6	+2.5
Registered electors		6,862		
Alliance gain from Conservative		Swing	▲7.5	

=== King's Lynn & West Norfolk ===
King's Lynn & West Norfolk District Summary
Party	Seats	+/-	Votes	%	+/-
Conservative	11		18,813	45.9	
Labour	2		13,493	32.9	
Alliance	1		8,675	21.2	
Total	14		40,981	39.9	
Registered electors			102,719	–	

Division results

Dersingham
Party	Candidate	Votes	%
Conservative	G. Pratt	1,520	46.1
Labour	M. Wilson	1,084	32.9
Alliance	R. Leeder	693	21.0
Majority		436	13.2
Turnout		3,297	44.4
Registered electors		6,596	
Conservative win (new seat)			

Docking
Party	Candidate	Votes	%
Conservative	H. Oliver*	1,575	46.5
Labour	J. Rosser	1,332	39.3
Alliance	E. High	483	14.2
Majority		243	7.2
Turnout		3,390	47.0
Registered electors		7,218	
Conservative win (new seat)			

Downham Market
Party	Candidate	Votes	%	±%
Conservative	H. Rose*	1,517	60.7	+3.3
Labour	W. Holding	602	24.1	–8.1
Alliance	F. Parnell	379	15.2	+4.8
Majority		915	36.6	+11.5
Turnout		2,498	39.4	–8.4
Registered electors		6,333		
Conservative hold		Swing	▲5.8	

Feltwell
Party	Candidate	Votes	%	±%
Conservative	R. Marsh-Allen	1,171	51.9	+0.9
Labour	R. Everitt	648	28.7	–1.3
Alliance	A. Truscott	436	19.3	+0.3
Majority		523	23.2	+2.2
Turnout		2,255	33.2	–2.8
Registered electors		6,793		
Conservative hold		Swing	▲1.1	

Fincham
Party	Candidate	Votes	%	±%
Conservative	F. Rockliffe*	1,357	57.5	+4.6
Labour	L. Hall	1,002	42.5	+9.3
Majority		355	15.0	–4.7
Turnout		2,359	35.2	–3.0
Registered electors		6,710		
Conservative hold		Swing	▼2.4	

Freebridge Lynn
Party	Candidate	Votes	%
Conservative	J. Dutton*	1,690	42.7
Alliance	J. Pearce	1,565	39.5
Labour	D. Collis	705	17.8
Majority		125	3.2
Turnout		3,960	52.2
Registered electors		7,593	
Conservative win (new seat)			

Gaywood North & Central
Party	Candidate	Votes	%
Conservative	B. Barton	1,119	41.7
Labour	W. Davison	952	35.5
Alliance	G. Fox	613	22.8
Majority		167	6.2
Turnout		2,684	38.5
Registered electors		6,968	
Conservative win (new seat)			

Gaywood South
Party	Candidate	Votes	%
Labour	R. Williams	1,289	62.0
Alliance	B. Howling	483	23.2
Conservative	J. Bacon	308	14.8
Majority		806	38.8
Turnout		2,080	40.4
Registered electors		5,150	
Labour win (new seat)			

Hunstanton
Party	Candidate	Votes	%	±%
Conservative	S. Tweedy-Smith	1,779	52.4	+0.1
Labour	B. Devlin	1,025	30.2	–9.5
Alliance	A. Bates	588	17.3	+9.3
Majority		754	22.2	+9.6
Turnout		3,392	44.5	+4.0
Registered electors		7,615		
Conservative hold		Swing	▲4.8	

King's Lynn North & Central
Party	Candidate	Votes	%
Labour	J. Donaldson*	1,367	59.1
Conservative	J. Cook	650	28.1
Alliance	S. Brockwell	297	12.8
Majority		717	31.0
Turnout		2,314	34.1
Registered electors		6,788	
Labour win (new seat)			

King's Lynn South
Party	Candidate	Votes	%	±%
Alliance	K. Leeder	1,306	46.5	N/A
Labour	F. Juniper*	792	28.2	–35.7
Conservative	E. Nockolds	708	25.2	–10.9
Majority		514	18.3	N/A
Turnout		2,806	45.6	+2.6
Registered electors		6,149		
Alliance gain from Labour		Swing		

Marshland North
Party	Candidate	Votes	%
Conservative	S. Dorrington	1,155	45.5
Labour	J. Wiggs	838	33.0
Alliance	R. Everett	545	21.5
Majority		317	12.5
Turnout		2,538	32.5
Registered electors		7,808	
Conservative win (new seat)			

Marshland South
Party	Candidate	Votes	%
Conservative	H. Goose*	1,544	73.3
Labour	P. Savage	562	26.7
Majority		982	46.6
Turnout		2,106	32.3
Registered electors		6,519	
Conservative win (new seat)			

Winch
Party	Candidate	Votes	%
Conservative	H. Bolt	1,306	50.7
Labour	F. Boyton	671	26.1
Alliance	D. Lefever	597	23.2
Majority		635	24.7
Turnout		2,574	37.2
Registered electors		6,915	
Conservative win (new seat)			

=== North Norfolk ===
North Norfolk District Summary
Party	Seats	+/-	Votes	%	+/-
Conservative	8		12,804	42.3	
Labour	1		8,209	27.1	
Alliance	1		7,789	25.7	
Independent	0		790	2.6	
Ind. Conservative	0		483	1.6	
Ecology	0		187	0.6	
Total	10		30,262	44.9	
Registered electors			67,368	–	

Division results

Cromer
Party	Candidate	Votes	%	±%
Conservative	E. Lycett *	1,436	49.7	+5.4
Independent	D. Harrison	790	27.3	N/A
Labour	T. Connolly	665	23.0	–6.3
Majority		646	22.3	+7.3
Turnout		2,891	41.8	–7.8
Registered electors		6,910		
Conservative hold		Swing		

Erpington & Melton Constable
Party	Candidate	Votes	%
Conservative	P. Mercer	1,057	38.5
Labour	D. Denny	990	36.1
Alliance	J. Wyatt	695	25.3
Majority		67	2.4
Turnout		2,742	46.0
Registered electors		5,659	
Conservative win (new seat)			

Fakenham
Party	Candidate	Votes	%
Labour	D. Parsons*	1,199	49.0
Conservative	A. Barker	851	34.8
Alliance	J. Elworthy	396	16.2
Majority		348	14.2
Turnout		2,446	38.3
Registered electors		6,384	
Labour win (new seat)			

Holt
Party	Candidate	Votes	%
Alliance	A. Latten	2,305	59.2
Conservative	M. Baker	1,152	29.6
Labour	D. Burkett	435	11.2
Majority		1,153	29.6
Turnout		3,892	57.2
Registered electors		6,799	
Alliance win (new seat)			

Mundesley
Party	Candidate	Votes	%
Conservative	G. Gotts*	1,616	52.8
Labour	R. Griggs	791	25.9
Alliance	A. Moore	652	21.3
Majority		825	27.0
Turnout		3,059	45.2
Registered electors		6,763	
Conservative win (new seat)			

North Smallburgh
Party	Candidate	Votes	%	±%
Conservative	W. Fryer	1,146	38.7	–3.1
Alliance	P. Baldwin	951	32.1	N/A
Labour	G. Amies	867	29.3	–28.9
Majority		195	6.6	N/A
Turnout		2,964	41.6	+1.6
Registered electors		7,120		
Conservative gain from Labour		Swing		

North Walsham
Party	Candidate	Votes	%	±%
Conservative	C. Bayne	1,277	41.8	–12.1
Labour	J. Taylor	1,106	36.2	–9.9
Alliance	P. Moore	674	22.0	N/A
Majority		171	5.6	–2.3
Turnout		3,057	43.3	–1.9
Registered electors		7,052		
Conservative hold		Swing	▼1.1	

Sheringham
Party	Candidate	Votes	%	±%
Conservative	M. English*	1,643	56.7	–11.4
Alliance	G. Ward	811	28.0	N/A
Labour	D. Galton	445	15.4	–16.5
Majority		832	28.7	–7.5
Turnout		2,899	40.3	+1.7
Registered electors		7,200		
Conservative hold		Swing		

South Smallburgh
Party	Candidate	Votes	%	±%
Conservative	L. Mogford	1,270	41.9	–11.5
Alliance	H. Nickson	602	19.9	–6.5
Labour	S. Shaw	488	16.1	–4.1
Ind. Conservative	J. Webb	483	15.9	N/A
Ecology	P. Filgate	187	6.2	N/A
Majority		668	22.0	–5.0
Turnout		3,030	43.8	–17.3
Registered electors		6,911		
Conservative hold		Swing	▼3.5	

Wells
Party	Candidate	Votes	%
Conservative	R. Wootten	1,356	41.3
Labour	A. Cunningham	1,223	37.3
Alliance	E. Chubb	703	21.4
Majority		133	4.1
Turnout		3,282	50.0
Registered electors		6,570	
Conservative win (new seat)			

=== Norwich ===
Norwich District Summary
Party	Seats	+/-	Votes	%	+/-
Labour	13		21,474	50.7	
Alliance	2		10,892	25.7	
Conservative	1		9,974	23.6	
Total	16		42,343	44.8	
Registered electors			94,607	–	

Division results

Bowthorpe
Party	Candidate	Votes	%	±%
Labour	R. Roe*	1,536	69.8	+9.5
Alliance	P. Fitt	336	15.3	+2.6
Conservative	H. Collins	329	14.9	–7.7
Majority		1,200	54.5	+16.9
Turnout		2,201	33.4	–7.2
Registered electors		6,581		
		Swing	▲3.5	

Catton Grove
Party	Candidate	Votes	%
Labour	D. Tilley	1,186	55.1
Conservative	I. Dale	594	27.6
Alliance	V. Morgan	371	17.2
Majority		592	27.5
Turnout		2,151	37.1
Registered electors		5,799	
Labour win (new seat)			

Coslany
Party	Candidate	Votes	%	±%
Labour	F. Sawbridge	1,398	57.2	–2.5
Conservative	E. Horth	654	26.8	–1.8
Alliance	M. Cawdron	390	19.0	+4.2
Majority		744	30.5	–0.6
Turnout		2,442	38.4	–6.9
Registered electors		6,365		
Labour hold		Swing	▼0.3	

Crome
Party	Candidate	Votes	%	±%
Labour	R. Dyball	1,433	63.7	–0.9
Alliance	D. Williment	434	19.3	+3.1
Conservative	L. Prince	384	17.1	–2.1
Majority		999	44.4	–1.0
Turnout		2,251	36.6	–1.5
Registered electors		6,147		
Labour hold		Swing	▼0.5	

Eaton
Party	Candidate	Votes	%	±%
Conservative	G. Shephard*	1,756	43.9	–13.1
Alliance	C. Lavin	1,539	38.4	+24.6
Labour	D. Hart	708	17.7	–11.5
Majority		217	5.4	–22.3
Turnout		4,003	60.7	+4.5
Registered electors		6,592		
Conservative hold		Swing	▼18.9	

Heigham
Party	Candidate	Votes	%
Labour	John Sheppard *	1,273	65.0
Alliance	C. Baxter	344	17.6
Conservative	N. Stimpson	342	17.5
Majority		929	47.4
Turnout		1,959	34.6
Registered electors		5,660	
Labour win (new seat)			

Henderson
Party	Candidate	Votes	%
Labour	R. Phelan*	1,415	63.9
Conservative	J. Simpson	423	19.1
Alliance	H. Parker	378	17.1
Majority		992	44.8
Turnout		2,216	38.8
Registered electors		5,706	
Labour win (new seat)			

Lakenham
Party	Candidate	Votes	%	±%
Labour	A. Heading	1,644	62.2	–3.1
Alliance	J. Lay	551	20.8	+7.1
Conservative	E. Collishaw	450	17.0	–4.0
Majority		1,093	41.3	–3.0
Turnout		2,645	44.7	+2.1
Registered electors		5,915		
Labour hold		Swing	▼5.1	

Mancroft
Party	Candidate	Votes	%	±%
Labour	S. Isbell	1,353	58.0	–3.5
Conservative	J. Dann	513	22.0	–2.4
Alliance	R. Bird	467	20.0	+5.9
Majority		840	36.0	–1.0
Turnout		2,333	40.0	+2.7
Registered electors		5,827		
Labour hold		Swing	▼0.6	

Mile Cross
Party	Candidate	Votes	%
Labour	Andrew Panes	1,230	73.6
Alliance	S. Oakley	234	14.0
Conservative	M. Ashton	207	12.4
Majority		996	59.6
Turnout		1,671	29.6
Registered electors		5,643	
Labour win (new seat)			

Mousehold
Party	Candidate	Votes	%	±%
Labour	S. Carus	1,476	64.0	–6.7
Conservative	C. Whiteside	449	19.5	+2.2
Alliance	B. Harty	381	16.5	+4.5
Majority		1,027	44.5	–8.9
Turnout		2,306	36.2	+0.1
Registered electors		6,370		
Labour hold		Swing	▼4.5	

Nelson
Party	Candidate	Votes	%	±%
Labour	J. Paul	1,329	40.7	+0.3
Conservative	S. Knights	987	30.2	–11.4
Alliance	D. Burgess	952	29.1	+15.3
Majority		342	10.5	N/A
Turnout		3,268	62.0	+4.6
Registered electors		5,275		
Labour gain from Conservative		Swing	▲5.9	

St Stephen
Party	Candidate	Votes	%	±%
Labour	Celia Cameron *	1,722	50.0	+4.6
Conservative	N. Duval	1,230	35.7	–4.1
Alliance	L. Hubbard	493	14.3	–0.5
Majority		492	14.3	+8.7
Turnout		3,445	62.3	+5.2
Registered electors		5,526		
Labour hold		Swing	▲4.4	

Thorpe Hamlet
Party	Candidate	Votes	%
Alliance	A. Willement*	1,893	57.7
Labour	P. Peterson	989	30.2
Conservative	J. Fisher	397	12.1
Majority		904	27.6
Turnout		3,279	56.2
Registered electors		5,830	
Alliance win (new seat)			

Town Close
Party	Candidate	Votes	%	±%
Alliance	J. Phillips	1,620	44.0	+17.9
Labour	L. Addison	1,357	36.8	–2.6
Conservative	E. Perry	709	19.2	–15.3
Majority		263	7.1	N/A
Turnout		3,686	64.5	+1.3
Registered electors		5,716		
Alliance gain from Labour		Swing	▲10.3	

University
Party	Candidate	Votes	%	±%
Labour	George Turner *	1,425	57.3	+4.0
Conservative	B. Baillie	553	22.2	–2.7
Alliance	L. Williams	509	20.5	+3.5
Majority		872	35.1	+6.7
Turnout		2,487	44.0	–3.4
Registered electors		5,655		
Labour hold		Swing	▲3.4	

=== South Norfolk ===
South Norfolk District Summary
Party	Seats	+/-	Votes	%	+/-
Conservative	6		15,299	41.7	
Alliance	5		14,716	40.2	
Labour	0		6,635	18.1	
Total	11		36,650	47.4	
Registered electors			77,299	–	

Division results

Clavering
Party	Candidate	Votes	%
Alliance	R. Carden*	1,845	49.1
Conservative	J. Howlett	1,280	34.1
Labour	L. Hannant	630	16.8
Majority		565	15.0
Turnout		3,755	54.2
Registered electors		6,925	
Alliance win (new seat)			

Costessey
Party	Candidate	Votes	%
Alliance	P. Wheeldon	1,380	42.2
Conservative	G. Lowe	1,108	33.9
Labour	P. Waller	782	23.9
Majority		272	8.3
Turnout		3,270	42.1
Registered electors		7,760	
Alliance win (new seat)			

Diss
Party	Candidate	Votes	%
Conservative	F. Mullender	1,375	49.4
Alliance	I. Jacoby	856	30.8
Labour	J. Davies	552	19.8
Majority		519	18.6
Turnout		2,783	37.2
Registered electors		7,474	
Conservative win (new seat)			

East Depwade
Party	Candidate	Votes	%
Alliance	Steven Revell	1,966	53.1
Conservative	P. Alexander	1,344	36.3
Labour	B. Warshaw	395	10.7
Majority		622	16.8
Turnout		3,705	52.3
Registered electors		7,085	
Alliance win (new seat)			

Henstead
Party	Candidate	Votes	%	±%
Conservative	P. Chapman	1,378	47.2	–12.2
Alliance	P. Bradshaw	898	30.8	N/A
Labour	M. Waller	641	22.0	–18.6
Majority		480	16.5	–2.3
Turnout		2,917	44.0	–5.0
Registered electors		6,633		
Conservative hold		Swing		

Hingham
Party	Candidate	Votes	%
Conservative	R. Carman	1,275	44.6
Alliance	R. Edwards	984	34.4
Labour	M. Colk	602	21.0
Majority		291	10.2
Turnout		2.861	46.0
Registered electors		6,224	
Conservative win (new seat)			

Humbleyard
Party	Candidate	Votes	%	±%
Conservative	I. Coutts*	1,336	44.4	–2.3
Alliance	R. Watts	1,326	44.1	+16.5
Labour	J. Halsey	345	11.5	–14.3
Majority		10	0.3	–18.8
Turnout		3,007	50.5	+2.5
Registered electors		5,955		
Conservative hold		Swing	▼9.4	

Loddon
Party	Candidate	Votes	%	±%
Conservative	A. Gunson*	2,074	57.6	–1.1
Labour	J. Skilleter	788	21.9	–3.2
Alliance	T. Wells	737	20.5	+4.3
Majority		1,286	35.7	+2.0
Turnout		3,599	53.5	+1.9
Registered electors		6,722		
Conservative hold		Swing	▲1.1	

Long Stratton
Party	Candidate	Votes	%
Alliance	E. Littler	1,541	49.0
Conservative	J. Turnbull	1,225	38.9
Labour	S. Blaikie	382	12.1
Majority		316	10.0
Turnout		3,148	47.1
Registered electors		6,684	
Alliance win (new seat)			

West Depwade
Party	Candidate	Votes	%
Conservative	N. Chapman	1,597	44.3
Alliance	R. McClenning	1,470	40.8
Labour	S. Collier	539	14.9
Majority		127	3.5
Turnout		3,606	46.9
Registered electors		7,695	
Conservative win (new seat)			

Wymondham
Party	Candidate	Votes	%	±%
Alliance	A. Tibbitt	1,713	42.8	+18.2
Conservative	B. Ford	1,307	32.7	–3.8
Labour	E. Parker	979	24.5	–14.3
Majority		406	10.2	N/A
Turnout		3,999	49.1	–3.8
Registered electors		8,142		
Alliance gain from Labour		Swing	▲11.0	
