= 1989 Norfolk County Council election =

1989 English local election

← 1985	4 May 1989	1993 →

All 84 seats to Norfolk County Council 43 seats needed for a majority
- Registered: 584,057 (▲5.8%)
- Turnout: 40.8% (▼1.1%)

	First party	Second party	Third party
Party	Conservative	Labour	SLD
Last election	44 seats, 40.0%	25 seats, 32.3%	15 seats, 26.8%
Seats won	47	28	9
Seat change	▲3	▲3	▼6
Popular vote	101,975	82,067	42,228
Percentage	42.7%	34.4%	17.7%
Swing	▲2.7%	▲2.1%	▼9.1%
Council control before election
Conservative
Council control after election
Conservative

The 1989 Norfolk County Council election took place on 4 May 1989 to elect members of Norfolk County Council in Norfolk, England. This was on the same day as other local elections.

== Summary ==
=== Election result ===
1989 Norfolk County Council election
Party	Candidates	Seats	Gains	Losses	Net gain/loss	Seats %	Votes %	Votes	+/−
Conservative	83	47	6	3	▲3	56.0	42.7	101,975	+2.7
Labour	82	28	5	2	▲3	33.0	34.4	82,067	+2.1
SLD	70	9	1	7	▼6	10.7	17.7	42,228	–9.1
Green	38	0	0	0	Steady	0.0	4.2	9,904	+4.1
SDP	6	0	0	0	Steady	0.0	0.6	1,516	N/A
Independent Labour	2	0	0	0	Steady	0.0	0.2	530	N/A
Independent	1	0	0	0	Steady	0.0	0.1	260	–0.5
Ind. Conservative	1	0	0	0	Steady	0.0	<0.1	53	–0.2
BNP	1	0	0	0	Steady	0.0	<0.1	18	N/A

== Division results by local authority ==
=== Breckland ===
Breckland District Summary
Party	Seats	+/-	Votes	%	+/-
Conservative	9	▲1	15,420	49.4	+1.9
Labour	2	▼1	10,911	35.0	+2.1
SLD	0	Steady	2,818	9.0	–8.3
Green	0	Steady	1,590	5.1	N/A
SDP	0	Steady	249	0.8	N/A
Ind. Labour	0	Steady	202	0.6	N/A
Total	11	Steady	31,190	39.7	+0.9
Registered electors			78,619	–	+7.5

Division results

Attleborough
Party	Candidate	Votes	%	±%
Conservative	J. Alston*	1,976	62.1	+7.6
Labour	P. Taylor	640	20.1	–3.0
SLD	W. Crump	317	10.0	–12.4
SDP	E. Serpell	249	7.8	N/A
Majority		1,336	42.0	+10.6
Turnout		3,182	36.6	–0.9
Registered electors		8,695		
Conservative hold		Swing	▲5.3	

Dereham East
Party	Candidate	Votes	%	±%
Labour	L. Potter*	1,603	50.4	+6.1
Conservative	M. Fanthorpe	1,252	39.4	–1.4
SLD	R. Holmes	324	10.2	–4.6
Majority		351	11.0	+7.5
Turnout		3,179	41.8	+3.4
Registered electors		7,603		
Labour hold		Swing	▲3.8	

Dereham West
Party	Candidate	Votes	%	±%
Conservative	M. Duigan*	1,294	45.6	–10.7
Labour	S. Nurse	1,002	35.3	–8.4
Green	T. Park	338	11.9	N/A
SLD	P. Watson	202	7.1	N/A
Majority		292	10.3	–2.4
Turnout		2,836	40.6	+4.3
Registered electors		6,989		
Conservative hold		Swing	▼1.2	

Elmham & Mattishall
Party	Candidate	Votes	%	±%
Conservative	I. Floering-Blackman	1,749	54.0	–5.2
Labour	S. Brown	1,010	31.2	+14.6
SLD	R. Buck	481	14.8	–9.4
Majority		729	22.8	–12.3
Turnout		3,240	42.0	+4.8
Registered electors		7,708		
Conservative hold		Swing	▼9.9	

Guiltcross
Party	Candidate	Votes	%	±%
Conservative	Peter Rollin*	1,370	48.5	–1.1
Labour	A. Hanson	648	22.9	–6.5
Green	G. Leigh	630	22.3	N/A
SLD	F. Attfield	177	6.3	–14.8
Majority		722	25.6	+5.4
Turnout		2,825	42.1	+1.2
Registered electors		6,711		
Conservative hold		Swing	▲2.7	

Necton & Launditch
Party	Candidate	Votes	%	±%
Conservative	J. Birkbeck*	1,845	47.1	–8.2
Labour	D. Holland	1,455	37.1	+8.7
SLD	A. Drury	392	10.0	–6.3
Green	J. Stokes	228	5.8	N/A
Majority		390	9.9	–17.0
Turnout		3,920	52.3	+10.4
Registered electors		7,493		
Conservative hold		Swing	▼7.5	

Swaffham
Party	Candidate	Votes	%	±%
Conservative	T. Wilding	1,632	65.1	+18.5
Labour	S. Kincald	876	34.9	–5.2
Majority		756	30.1	+23.6
Turnout		2,508	36.4	–4.2
Registered electors		6,890		
Conservative hold		Swing	▲11.9	

Thetford East
Party	Candidate	Votes	%	±%
Conservative	P. Pearson	1,319	44.9	+13.4
Labour	J. Ramm*	1,092	37.2	+4.2
SLD	D. Jeffrey	274	9.3	–5.8
Green	J. Chisman	253	8.6	N/A
Majority		227	7.7	N/A
Turnout		2,938	37.3	–0.2
Registered electors		7,876		
Conservative gain from Labour		Swing	▲4.6	

Thetford West
Party	Candidate	Votes	%	±%
Labour	T. Paines*	1,085	50.8	+5.2
Conservative	F. Wilkes	679	31.8	+8.8
SLD	M. Rouse	229	10.7	–20.7
Green	M. Christodoulides	141	6.6	N/A
Majority		406	19.0	+4.8
Turnout		2,134	35.0	–3.2
Registered electors		6,096		
Labour hold		Swing	▼1.8	

Watton
Party	Candidate	Votes	%	±%
Conservative	J. Beddoes	1,733	63.8	+0.1
Labour	R. Barker	561	20.7	+4.7
SLD	J. Glover	422	15.5	–2.4
Majority		1,172	43.2	–2.6
Turnout		2,716	35.7	–5.0
Registered electors		7,609		
Conservative hold		Swing	▼2.3	

Wissey
Party	Candidate	Votes	%	±%
Conservative	S. Steward*	1,657	58.0	+6.2
Labour	R. Key	656	23.0	+0.1
SLD	R. Green	544	19.0	–6.3
Majority		1,001	35.0	+8.5
Turnout		2,857	39.7	–0.8
Registered electors		7,188		
Conservative hold		Swing	▲3.1	

=== Broadland ===
Broadland District Summary
Party	Seats	+/-	Votes	%	+/-
Conservative	10	▲2	15,120	48.6	+3.3
SLD	1	▼3	7,750	24.9	–7.5
Labour	1	▲1	6,861	22.1	–0.2
Green	0	Steady	1,129	3.6	N/A
SDP	0	Steady	173	0.6	N/A
Ind. Conservative	0	Steady	53	0.2	N/A
Total	12	Steady	31,086	37.3	–3.8
Registered electors			83,386	–	+8.1

Division results

Acle
Party	Candidate	Votes	%	±%
Conservative	R. Chase*	1,139	56.5	+2.5
Labour	M. Higgleton	523	25.9	±0.0
SLD	K. Fursse	355	17.6	–2.5
Majority		616	30.5	+2.5
Turnout		2,017	33.9	–4.0
Registered electors		5,942		
Conservative hold		Swing	▲1.3	

Aylsham
Party	Candidate	Votes	%	±%
Conservative	F. Roualle*	1,321	52.1	+3.8
Labour	A. Warnes	763	30.1	+2.2
SLD	M. Green	450	17.8	–6.0
Majority		558	22.0	+1.6
Turnout		2,534	34.8	+0.3
Registered electors		7,287		
Conservative hold		Swing	▲0.8	

Blofield & Brundall
Party	Candidate	Votes	%	±%
Conservative	J. Mack*	1,574	55.7	+5.3
SLD	J. Smithson	1,252	44.3	+16.2
Majority		322	11.4	–10.9
Turnout		2,826	35.1	–2.4
Registered electors		8,058		
Conservative hold		Swing	▼5.5	

Hellesdon
Party	Candidate	Votes	%	±%
Conservative	M. Clarke	1,017	41.4	+6.8
SLD	P. Balcombe*	864	35.2	–2.2
Labour	P. Cunningham	574	23.4	–4.7
Majority		153	6.2	N/A
Turnout		2,455	36.2	–9.5
Registered electors		6,786		
Conservative gain from SLD		Swing	▲4.5	

Horsford
Party	Candidate	Votes	%	±%
SLD	B. Shaw*	932	41.5	–0.2
Conservative	D. Crosby	851	37.9	+2.4
Labour	T. Bartlett	461	20.5	–2.4
Majority		81	3.6	–2.6
Turnout		2,244	36.7	–3.1
Registered electors		6,121		
SLD hold		Swing	▼1.3	

Old Catton
Party	Candidate	Votes	%	±%
Conservative	L. Austin*	1,398	52.0	+3.7
SLD	K. Moss	573	21.3	–11.1
Labour	R. Bounden	492	18.3	–1.0
Green	P. Batchelor	228	8.5	N/A
Majority		825	30.7	+14.8
Turnout		2,691	34.4	–2.7
Registered electors		7,831		
Conservative hold		Swing	▲7.4	

Reepham
Party	Candidate	Votes	%	±%
Conservative	S. Marshall*	1,396	53.7	+4.8
Labour	J. Copsey	497	19.1	+1.1
Green	R. Betts	359	13.8	N/A
SLD	G. Graham	348	13.4	–19.7
Majority		899	34.6	+18.9
Turnout		2,600	40.2	–4.5
Registered electors		6,460		
Conservative hold		Swing	▲1.9	

Sprowston
Party	Candidate	Votes	%	±%
Labour	K. Lashley	1,424	41.6	+8.8
Conservative	P. Spendlove	1,149	33.6	+1.0
SLD	A. Young*	720	21.1	–13.5
Green	P. Scott	127	3.7	N/A
Majority		275	8.0	N/A
Turnout		3,420	44.8	–1.4
Registered electors		7,641		
Labour gain from SLD		Swing	▲3.9	

Taverham
Party	Candidate	Votes	%	±%
Conservative	D. Burrell	1,202	42.5	–0.7
SLD	J. Robinson*	1,082	38.2	–9.4
Labour	V. Birtle	302	10.7	+1.5
Green	I. Carter	243	8.6	N/A
Majority		120	4.2	N/A
Turnout		2,829	41.5	–6.3
Registered electors		6,815		
Conservative gain from SLD		Swing	▲4.4	

Thorpe St Andrew
Party	Candidate	Votes	%	±%
Conservative	F. Oxborough	1,360	52.0	–2.0
Labour	G. Golding	687	26.3	+4.8
SLD	C. Durdin	342	13.1	–11.4
Green	R. Hunter	172	6.6	N/A
Ind. Conservative	J. Fairrie	53	2.0	N/A
Majority		673	25.7	–3.8
Turnout		2,614	36.9	–3.9
Registered electors		7,092		
Conservative hold		Swing	▼3.4	

Woodside
Party	Candidate	Votes	%	±%
Conservative	L. Woolf*	1,235	52.1	+6.4
Labour	S. Dyball	730	30.8	+6.9
SLD	S. Larn	234	9.9	–20.6
SDP	R. Lynch	173	7.3	N/A
Majority		505	21.3	+6.1
Turnout		2,372	34.8	–4.7
Registered electors		6,813		
Conservative hold		Swing	▼0.3	

Wroxham
Party	Candidate	Votes	%	±%
Conservative	J. Peel*	1,478	59.5	+5.4
SLD	D. Reeves	598	24.1	–7.5
Labour	J. Hockenhull	408	16.4	+2.1
Majority		880	35.4	+12.9
Turnout		2,484	38.0	–4.1
Registered electors		6,540		
Conservative hold		Swing	▲6.5	

=== Great Yarmouth ===
Great Yarmouth District Summary
Party	Seats	+/-	Votes	%	+/-
Labour	6	Steady	10,418	49.5	+9.4
Conservative	4	▲2	9,214	43.8	+7.0
SLD	0	▼2	767	3.6	–19.3
Ind. Labour	0	Steady	328	1.6	N/A
Green	0	Steady	309	1.5	bN/A
Total	10	Steady	21,036	33.2	–1.6
Registered electors			63,337	–	+6.2

Division results

Caister & Great Yarmouth North
Party	Candidate	Votes	%	±%
Labour	P. Hacon*	1,353	56.6	+10.5
Conservative	J. Ray	1,036	43.4	+1.0
Majority		317	13.3	+9.6
Turnout		2,389	35.2	–5.4
Registered electors		6,781		
Labour hold		Swing	▲4.8	

East Flegg
Party	Candidate	Votes	%	±%
Conservative	F. Stuttaford*	1,417	61.5	+6.8
Labour	J. Doyle	727	31.5	+7.6
SLD	J. Wilkes	161	7.0	–14.5
Majority		690	29.9	–0.9
Turnout		2,305	29.9	–0.3
Registered electors		7,714		
Conservative hold		Swing	▼0.4	

Gorleston St Andrews
Party	Candidate	Votes	%	±%
Conservative	G. Girling	1,178	51.4	+1.1
Labour	B. Baughan	957	41.7	+9.4
SLD	P. Matthew	158	6.9	–10.5
Majority		221	9.6	–8.4
Turnout		2,293	39.4	+6.9
Registered electors		5,818		
Conservative hold		Swing	▼4.2	

Great Yarmouth Nelson
Party	Candidate	Votes	%	±%
Labour	J. Holmes	1,112	49.5	–4.4
Conservative	G. Jarvis	711	31.7	–4.2
Independent Labour	D. Maddeys*	328	14.6	N/A
Green	J. Edmonds	94	4.2	N/A
Majority		401	17.9	–0.1
Turnout		2,245	33.0	–2.5
Registered electors		6,799		
Labour hold		Swing	▼0.1	

Lothingland East & Magdalen West
Party	Candidate	Votes	%	±%
Labour	P. Mason	1,530	56.4	–1.5
Conservative	M. Taylor	966	35.6	+11.3
Green	P. Rouse	215	7.9	N/A
Majority		564	20.8	–12.8
Turnout		2,711	35.6	±0.0
Registered electors		7,616		
Labour hold		Swing	▼6.4	

Lothingland West
Party	Candidate	Votes	%	±%
Conservative	P. Timewell	1,366	53.3	+17.1
Labour	B. Callan*	956	37.3	+19.5
SLD	M. Cooke	241	9.4	–36.6
Majority		410	16.0	N/A
Turnout		2,563	31.2	+0.8
Registered electors		8,211		
Conservative gain from SLD		Swing	▼1.2	

Magdalen East & Claydon
Party	Candidate	Votes	%	±%
Labour	A. Blyth	1,381	74.5	+13.9
Conservative	J. Russell	472	25.5	+1.2
Majority		909	49.1	+12.8
Turnout		1,853	32.2	–1.1
Registered electors		5,758		
Labour hold		Swing	▲6.4	

Northgate
Party	Candidate	Votes	%	±%
Labour	D. Saunders*	939	54.8	+3.3
Conservative	J. Permenter	571	33.4	–1.7
Independent Labour	D. Maddeys	202	11.8	N/A
Majority		368	21.5	+5.1
Turnout		1,712	34.6	–3.0
Registered electors		4,949		
Labour hold		Swing	▲2.5	

Southtown & Cobholm
Party	Candidate	Votes	%	±%
Labour	M. Castle	1,558	73.7	+12.9
Conservative	J. Berenguer	555	26.3	+0.2
Majority		1,003	47.5	+12.7
Turnout		2,113	30.1	–1.0
Registered electors		7,018		
Labour hold		Swing	▲6.4	

West Flegg
Party	Candidate	Votes	%	±%
Conservative	M. Lovewell-Blake	1,513	59.0	+20.3
Labour	R. Huxtable	844	32.9	+17.1
SLD	M. Glauert	207	8.1	–37.4
Majority		669	26.1	N/A
Turnout		2,564	33.6	–11.0
Registered electors		7,622		
Conservative gain from SLD		Swing	▲1.6	

=== King's Lynn & West Norfolk ===
King's Lynn & West Norfolk District Summary
Party	Seats	+/-	Votes	%	+/-
Conservative	11	Steady	20,269	50.0	+4.1
Labour	3	▲1	14,981	37.0	+4.1
SLD	0	▼1	5,003	12.3	–8.9
Independent	0	Steady	260	0.6	N/A
Total	14	Steady	40,513	36.7	–3.2
Registered electors			110,269	–	'+7.4

Division results

Dersingham
Party	Candidate	Votes	%	±%
Conservative	G. Pratt*	1,773	57.2	+11.1
Labour	P. Ringwood	1,003	32.3	–0.6
SLD	T. Baker	326	10.5	–10.5
Majority		770	24.8	+11.6
Turnout		3,102	39.0	–5.4
Registered electors		7,958		
Conservative hold		Swing	▲5.9	

Docking
Party	Candidate	Votes	%	±%
Conservative	S. Bett	1,789	51.3	+4.8
Labour	J. Roper	1,324	37.9	–1.4
SLD	D. Gords	377	10.8	–3.4
Majority		456	13.3	+6.1
Turnout		3,490	46.5	–0.5
Registered electors		7,513		
Conservative hold		Swing	▲3.1	

Downham Market
Party	Candidate	Votes	%	±%
Conservative	H. Rose*	1,536	58.6	–2.1
Labour	R. Everitt	851	32.5	+8.4
SLD	A. Truscott	235	9.0	–6.2
Majority		685	26.1	–10.5
Turnout		2,622	37.0	–2.4
Registered electors		7,089		
Conservative hold		Swing	▼5.3	

Feltwell
Party	Candidate	Votes	%	±%
Conservative	R. Marsh-Allen	1,275	59.0	+7.1
Labour	S. Bunton	511	23.6	–5.1
SLD	D. Buckton	376	17.4	–1.9
Majority		764	35.3	+12.1
Turnout		2,162	30.8	–2.4
Registered electors		7,016		
Conservative hold		Swing	▲6.1	

Fincham
Party	Candidate	Votes	%	±%
Conservative	F. Rockliffe*	1,321	51.9	–5.6
Labour	D. Hall	873	34.3	–8.2
SLD	A. Waterman	350	13.8	N/A
Majority		448	17.6	+2.6
Turnout		2,544	36.3	+1.1
Registered electors		7,005		
Conservative hold		Swing	▲1.3	

Freebridge Lynn
Party	Candidate	Votes	%	±%
Conservative	J. Dutton*	2,203	60.5	+17.8
Labour	P. Austin	897	24.6	+6.8
SLD	M. Standeven	543	14.9	–24.6
Majority		1,306	35.8	+32.6
Turnout		3,643	42.9	–9.6
Registered electors		8,485		
Conservative hold		Swing	▲5.5	

Gaywood North & Central
Party	Candidate	Votes	%	±%
Conservative	B. Barton*	1,250	43.5	+1.8
Labour	N. Ashley	984	34.2	–1.3
SLD	J. Gough	642	22.3	–0.5
Majority		266	9.2	+3.0
Turnout		2,876	35.2	–3.3
Registered electors		8,182		
Conservative hold		Swing	▲1.5	

Gaywood South
Party	Candidate	Votes	%	±%
Labour	W. Davison	1,343	74.4	+12.4
Conservative	J. Bacon	329	18.2	+3.4
SLD	J. Loveless	132	7.3	–15.9
Majority		1,014	56.2	+17.4
Turnout		1,804	34.1	–6.3
Registered electors		5,297		
Labour hold		Swing	▲4.5	

Hunstanton
Party	Candidate	Votes	%	±%
Conservative	J. Lambert	1,868	53.6	+1.2
Labour	B. Devlin	1,347	38.6	+8.4
SLD	D. Standeven	272	7.8	–9.5
Majority		521	14.9	–7.6
Turnout		3,487	41.1	–3.4
Registered electors		8,486		
Conservative hold		Swing	▼3.6	

King's Lynn North & Central
Party	Candidate	Votes	%	±%
Labour	J. Donaldson*	1,523	66.7	+7.6
Conservative	H. Stern	501	21.9	–6.2
Independent	M. Buckley	260	11.4	N/A
Majority		1,022	44.7	+13.7
Turnout		2,284	32.3	–1.8
Registered electors		7,080		
Labour hold		Swing	▲6.9	

King's Lynn South
Party	Candidate	Votes	%	±%
Labour	B. Seaman	1,592	69.0	+40.8
Conservative	P. Bacon	596	25.8	+0.6
SLD	J. Robinson	119	5.2	–41.3
Majority		996	43.2	N/A
Turnout		2,307	37.5	–8.1
Registered electors		6,145		
Labour gain from SLD		Swing	▲20.1	

Marshland North
Party	Candidate	Votes	%	±%
Conservative	S. Dorrington*	1,147	46.0	+0.5
SLD	M. Walker	736	29.5	+8.0
Labour	L. Wilkinson	608	24.4	–8.6
Majority		411	16.5	+4.0
Turnout		2,491	29.7	–2.8
Registered electors		8,383		
Conservative hold		Swing	▼3.8	

Marshland South
Party	Candidate	Votes	%	±%
Conservative	H. Goose*	1,465	64.5	–8.8
Labour	J. Bantoft*	807	35.5	+8.8
Majority		658	29.0	–17.6
Turnout		2,272	32.9	+0.6
Registered electors		6,900		
Conservative hold		Swing	▼8.8	

Winch
Party	Candidate	Votes	%	±%
Conservative	H. Bolt*	1,559	60.6	+9.9
Labour	A. Moulineaux	662	25.7	–0.4
SLD	C. Dye	351	13.6	–9.6
Majority		897	34.9	–2.3
Turnout		2,572	34.1	–3.1
Registered electors		7,542		
Conservative hold		Swing	▲5.2	

=== North Norfolk ===
North Norfolk District Summary
Party	Seats	+/-	Votes	%	+/-
Conservative	6	▼2	15,317	46.4	+4.1
Labour	4	▲3	11,024	33.4	+6.3
SLD	0	▼1	4,683	14.2	–11.5
Green	0	Steady	1,567	4.7	+4.1
SDP	0	Steady	401	1.2	N/A
Total	10	Steady	32,992	45.3	+0.4
Registered electors			72,904	–	+8.2

Division results

Cromer
Party	Candidate	Votes	%	±%
Conservative	D. Turnbull	1,535	48.5	–1.2
Labour	D. Bussey	864	27.3	+4.3
SLD	H. Noble	769	24.3	N/A
Majority		671	21.2	–1.1
Turnout		3,168	42.4	+0.6
Registered electors		7,466		
Conservative hold		Swing	▼2.8	

Erpingham & Melton Constable
Party	Candidate	Votes	%	±%
Labour	M. Warnes	1,424	44.0	+7.9
Conservative	P. Mercer*	1,288	39.8	+1.3
SLD	D. Harrison	523	16.2	–9.1
Majority		136	4.2	N/A
Turnout		3,235	50.4	+4.4
Registered electors		6,422		
Labour gain from Conservative		Swing	▲3.3	

Fakenham
Party	Candidate	Votes	%	±%
Labour	D. Parsons*	1,654	50.7	+1.7
Conservative	C. Fountaine	1,611	49.3	+14.5
Majority		43	1.3	–12.9
Turnout		3,265	45.0	+6.7
Registered electors		7,254		
Labour hold		Swing	▼6.4	

Holt
Party	Candidate	Votes	%	±%
Conservative	M. Butt	1,605	48.3	+18.7
SLD	R. Brand	1,047	31.5	–27.7
Labour	H. Connolly	670	20.2	+9.0
Majority		558	16.8	N/A
Turnout		3,322	46.7	–10.5
Registered electors		7,117		
Conservative gain from SLD		Swing	▲23.2	

Mundesley
Party	Candidate	Votes	%	±%
Conservative	B. Spinks	1,563	48.5	–4.3
Labour	R. Lemmon	814	25.3	–0.6
Green	J. Mason	450	14.0	N/A
SLD	P. Corney	393	12.2	–9.1
Majority		749	23.3	–3.7
Turnout		3,220	43.5	–1.7
Registered electors		7,401		
Conservative hold		Swing	▲1.9	

North Smallburgh
Party	Candidate	Votes	%	±%
Labour	S. Cullingham	1,333	38.6	+9.3
Conservative	W. Fryer*	1,309	37.9	–0.8
SLD	P. Baldwin	598	17.3	–14.8
Green	N. Boyd	210	6.1	N/A
Majority		24	0.7	N/A
Turnout		3,450	45.1	+3.5
Registered electors		7,655		
Labour gain from Conservative		Swing	▲5.1	

North Walsham
Party	Candidate	Votes	%	±%
Labour	M. Booth	1,505	44.6	+8.4
Conservative	N. Woodruff	1,471	43.6	+1.8
SDP	N. Nickson	401	11.9	N/A
Majority		34	1.0	N/A
Turnout		3,377	42.7	–0.6
Registered electors		7,917		
Labour gain from Conservative		Swing	▲3.3	

Sheringham
Party	Candidate	Votes	%	±%
Conservative	R. Seligman	1,461	45.8	–10.9
SLD	A. Dennis	933	29.3	+1.3
Labour	P. Crump	458	14.4	–1.0
Green	S. Franklin	337	10.6	N/A
Majority		528	16.6	–12.1
Turnout		3,189	42.2	+1.9
Registered electors		7,550		
Conservative hold		Swing	▼6.1	

South Smallburgh
Party	Candidate	Votes	%	±%
Conservative	L. Mogford*	1,717	54.1	+12.2
Labour	A. Clarke	889	28.0	+11.9
Green	S. Beckley	570	17.9	+11.7
Majority		828	26.1	+4.1
Turnout		3,176	43.8	N/A
Registered electors		7,246		
Conservative hold		Swing	▲0.2	

Wells
Party	Candidate	Votes	%	±%
Conservative	G. Ashworth	1,757	48.9	+7.6
Labour	M. Gates	1,413	39.4	+2.1
SLD	E. Anderson	420	11.7	–9.7
Majority		344	9.6	+5.5
Turnout		3,590	52.2	+2.2
Registered electors		6,876		
Conservative hold		Swing	▲2.8	

=== Norwich ===
Norwich District Summary
Party	Seats	+/-	Votes	%	+/-
Labour	12	▼1	22,375	52.9	+2.2
Liberal Democrats	3	▲1	6,915	16.3	–9.4
Conservative	1	Steady	9,064	21.4	–2.2
Green	0	Steady	3,824	9.0	N/A
SDP	0	Steady	135	0.3	N/A
BNP	0	Steady	18	<0.1	N/A
Total	16	Steady	40,161	44.8	+0.1
Registered electors			94,337	–	–0.3

Division results

Bowthorpe
Party	Candidate	Votes	%	±%
Labour	R. Roe*	1,781	69.6	–0.2
Conservative	H. Collins	453	17.7	+2.8
Green	N. Dayton	175	6.8	N/A
SLD	J. Warns	149	5.8	–9.5
Majority		1,328	51.9	–2.6
Turnout		2,558	35.6	+2.2
Registered electors		7,191		
Labour hold		Swing	▼1.5	

Catton Grove
Party	Candidate	Votes	%	±%
Labour	D. Tilley*	1,261	60.9	+5.8
Conservative	R. Glasel	466	22.5	–5.1
Green	A. Darley	204	9.9	N/A
SLD	S. Richardson	139	6.7	–10.5
Majority		795	38.4	+10.9
Turnout		2,070	34.1	–3.0
Registered electors		6,064		
Labour hold		Swing	▲5.5	

Coslany
Party	Candidate	Votes	%	±%
Labour	R. Bartlett	1,636	61.7	+4.5
Conservative	E. Horth	555	20.9	–5.9
Green	P. Saunders	277	10.4	N/A
SLD	C. Cogman	184	6.9	–12.1
Majority		1,081	40.8	+10.4
Turnout		2,652	42.5	+4.1
Registered electors		6,246		
Labour hold		Swing	▲5.2	

Crome
Party	Candidate	Votes	%	±%
Labour	M. Barton	1,513	67.5	+3.8
Conservative	C. Cushing	432	19.3	+2.2
SLD	D. Williment	194	8.7	–10.9
Green	J. White	102	4.6	N/A
Majority		1,081	48.2	+3.8
Turnout		2,241	37.9	+1.3
Registered electors		5,909		
Labour hold		Swing	▲0.8	

Eaton
Party	Candidate	Votes	%	±%
Conservative	B. Wallis	1,968	51.8	+7.9
Labour	S. Whitaker	1,167	30.7	+13.0
SLD	G. Ford	300	7.9	–30.5
Green	B. Betts	211	5.6	N/A
SDP	J. McKernan	135	3.6	N/A
BNP	R. Heaton	18	0.5	N/A
Majority		801	21.1	+15.7
Turnout		3,799	56.9	–3.8
Registered electors		6,673		
Conservative hold		Swing	▼2.6	

Heigham
Party	Candidate	Votes	%	±%
Labour	J. Sheppard*	1,457	67.1	+2.1
Conservative	E. Cooper	372	17.1	–0.4
SLD	E. Maxfield	185	8.5	–9.1
Green	J. Wheatley	156	7.2	N/A
Majority		1,085	50.0	+2.6
Turnout		2,170	37.1	+2.5
Registered electors		5,844		
Labour hold		Swing	▲1.3	

Henderson
Party	Candidate	Votes	%	±%
Labour	R. Phelan*	1,452	62.8	–1.1
Green	D. Carlo	405	17.5	N/A
Conservative	J. Staples	350	15.1	–4.0
SLD	B. Doyle	104	4.5	–12.6
Majority		1,047	45.3	+0.5
Turnout		2,311	41.8	+3.0
Registered electors		5,533		
Labour hold				

Lakenham
Party	Candidate	Votes	%	±%
Labour	P. Ross	1,711	66.8	+4.6
Conservative	C. Barry	480	18.8	+1.8
Green	A. Searle	233	9.1	N/A
SLD	H. Tidman	136	5.3	–15.5
Majority		1,231	48.1	+6.8
Turnout		2,560	43.3	–1.4
Registered electors		5,913		
Labour hold		Swing	▲1.4	

Mancroft
Party	Candidate	Votes	%	±%
Labour	L. Addison	1,483	61.2	+3.2
Conservative	D. Banks	544	22.5	+0.5
Green	Tigger	243	10.0	N/A
SLD	C. Scrivener	152	6.3	–13.7
Majority		939	38.8	+2.8
Turnout		2,422	39.9	–0.1
Registered electors		6,065		
Labour hold		Swing	▲1.4	

Mile Cross
Party	Candidate	Votes	%	±%
Labour	A. Panes*	1,490	79.4	+5.8
Conservative	S. Michelli	250	13.3	+0.9
Green	A. Brennan	83	4.4	N/A
SLD	D. Summers	54	2.9	–11.1
Majority		1,240	66.1	+6.5
Turnout		1,877	33.1	+3.5
Registered electors		5,669		
Labour hold		Swing	▲2.5	

Mousehold
Party	Candidate	Votes	%	±%
Labour	P. Buttle	1,362	61.0	–3.0
Conservative	G. Fisher	388	17.4	–2.1
Green	R. Woolacott	351	15.7	N/A
SLD	M. Quinn	133	6.0	–10.5
Majority		974	43.6	–0.9
Turnout		2,234	35.7	–0.5
Registered electors		6,262		
Labour hold		Swing	▲0.5	

Nelson
Party	Candidate	Votes	%	±%
SLD	M. Lamb	1,355	43.1	+14.0
Labour	J. Paul*	1,111	35.4	–5.3
Conservative	M. Moore	442	14.1	–16.1
Green	S. Kinsey	234	7.4	N/A
Majority		244	7.8	N/A
Turnout		3,142	61.8	–0.2
Registered electors		5,088		
SLD gain from Labour		Swing	▲9.7	

St Stephen
Party	Candidate	Votes	%	±%
Labour	C. Cameron*	1,592	50.2	+0.2
Conservative	S. Pollok	991	31.3	–4.4
Green	P. Edwards	406	12.8	N/A
SLD	D. Munday	182	5.7	–8.6
Majority		601	19.0	+4.7
Turnout		3,171	59.0	–3.3
Registered electors		5,374		
Labour hold		Swing	▲2.3	

Thorpe Hamlet
Party	Candidate	Votes	%	±%
SLD	B. Critchley	1,216	45.2	–12.5
Labour	C. Bunnett	753	28.0	–2.2
Conservative	R. Rampley	444	16.5	+4.4
Green	L. Betts	280	10.4	N/A
Majority		463	17.2	–10.4
Turnout		2,693	47.6	–8.6
Registered electors		5,661		
SLD hold		Swing	▼5.2	

Town Close
Party	Candidate	Votes	%	±%
SLD	Lo. Maxfield	1,395	39.6	–4.4
Labour	K. Brown	1,342	38.1	+1.3
Conservative	A. Cargill	584	16.6	–2.6
Green	J. Wimhurst	198	5.6	N/A
Majority		53	1.5	–5.6
Turnout		3,519	62.5	–2.0
Registered electors		5,633		
SLD hold		Swing	▼2.9	

University
Party	Candidate	Votes	%	±%
Labour	George Turner *	1,264	43.4	–13.9
SLD	D. Hume	1,037	35.6	+15.1
Conservative	G. Parsons	345	11.8	–10.4
Green	A. Ashford	266	9.1	N/A
Majority		227	7.8	–27.2
Turnout		2,912	55.9	+11.9
Registered electors		5,212		
Labour hold		Swing	▼14.5	

=== South Norfolk ===
South Norfolk District Summary
Party	Seats	+/-	Votes	%	+/-
Conservative	6	Steady	17,571	44.6	+2.9
SLD	5	Steady	14,292	36.3	–3.9
Labour	0	Steady	5,497	14.0	–4.1
Green	0	Steady	1,485	3.8	N/A
SDP	0	Steady	558	1.4	N/A
Total	11	Steady	39,403	48.5	+1.1
Registered electors			81,205	–	+5.1

Division results

Clavering
Party	Candidate	Votes	%	±%
SLD	R. Carden*	1,688	47.3	–1.8
Conservative	S. Halton-Farrow	1,368	38.3	+4.2
Labour	E. Rochford	513	14.4	–2.4
Majority		320	9.0	–6.0
Turnout		3,569	49.7	–4.5
Registered electors		7,177		
SLD hold		Swing	▼3.0	

Costessey
Party	Candidate	Votes	%	±%
SLD	K. Rogers	1,661	43.7	+1.5
Conservative	M. Tomlinson	1,642	43.2	+9.3
Labour	R. Johnson	333	8.8	–15.1
Green	D. Shanks	167	4.4	N/A
Majority		19	0.5	–7.8
Turnout		3,803	48.2	+6.1
Registered electors		7,885		
SLD hold		Swing	▼3.9	

Diss
Party	Candidate	Votes	%	±%
Conservative	F. Mullender*	1,430	43.4	–6.0
SLD	I. Caldwell	1,104	33.5	+2.7
Labour	Daniel Zeichner	510	15.5	–4.3
Green	P. Ryland	248	7.5	N/A
Majority		326	9.9	–8.7
Turnout		3,292	40.2	+3.0
Registered electors		8,180		
Conservative hold		Swing	▼4.4	

East Depwade
Party	Candidate	Votes	%	±%
SLD	S. Revell*	1,678	44.0	–9.1
Conservative	R. Carter	1,516	39.8	+3.5
Labour	B. Warshaw	359	9.4	–1.3
Green	G. Sessions	257	6.7	N/A
Majority		162	4.3	–12.5
Turnout		3,810	50.3	–2.0
Registered electors		7,570		
SLD hold		Swing	▼6.3	

Henstead
Party	Candidate	Votes	%	±%
Conservative	G. Hemming	1,472	41.9	–5.3
SLD	P. Newell	1,355	38.6	+7.8
Labour	J. King	520	14.8	–7.2
Green	J. Green	167	4.8	N/A
Majority		117	3.3	–13.2
Turnout		3,514	51.6	+7.6
Registered electors		6,808		
Conservative hold		Swing	▼6.6	

Hingham
Party	Candidate	Votes	%	±%
Conservative	R. Carman*	1,465	48.8	+4.2
SLD	J. Dore	1,078	35.9	+1.5
Labour	J. Cook	462	15.4	–5.6
Majority		387	12.9	+2.7
Turnout		3,005	46.1	+0.1
Registered electors		6,512		
Conservative hold		Swing	▲1.4	

Humbleyard
Party	Candidate	Votes	%	±%
Conservative	A. King	1,699	50.1	+5.7
SLD	R. Watts	1,450	42.7	–1.4
Labour	S. Sewell	245	7.2	–4.3
Majority		219	7.3	+7.0
Turnout		3,394	52.0	+1.5
Registered electors		6,527		
Conservative hold		Swing	▲3.6	

Loddon
Party	Candidate	Votes	%	±%
Conservative	A. Gunson*	2,475	66.2	+8.6
Labour	J. Skilleter	848	22.7	+0.8
SDP	E. Green	413	11.1	N/A
Majority		1,627	43.5	+7.8
Turnout		3,736	53.6	+0.1
Registered electors		6,967		
Conservative hold		Swing	▲3.9	

Long Stratton
Party	Candidate	Votes	%	±%
SLD	E. Littler*	2,229	56.3	+7.3
Conservative	J. Jeeves	1,411	35.7	–3.2
Labour	S. Blaikie	178	4.5	–7.6
Green	D. White-Miller	139	3.5	N/A
Majority		818	20.7	+10.7
Turnout		3,957	56.2	+9.1
Registered electors		7,045		
SLD hold		Swing	▲5.3	

West Depwade
Party	Candidate	Votes	%	±%
Conservative	N. Chapman*	1,750	49.9	+5.6
SLD	R. McClenning	691	19.7	–21.1
Green	D. Mansell	507	14.5	N/A
Labour	B. Whall	414	11.8	–3.1
SDP	T. Donegan	145	4.1	N/A
Majority		1,059	30.2	+26.7
Turnout		3,507	43.2	–3.7
Registered electors		8,113		
Conservative hold		Swing	▲13.4	

Wymondham
Party	Candidate	Votes	%	±%
SLD	D. Hockaday	1,358	35.6	–7.2
Conservative	P. Tonkin	1,343	35.2	+2.5
Labour	C. Needle	1,115	29.2	+4.7
Majority		15	0.4	–9.8
Turnout		3,816	45.3	–3.8
Registered electors		8,421		
SLD hold		Swing	▼4.9	
