= Eaton, Norfolk =

Village and suburb in Norwich, England

Coordinates: 52.61390°N 1.26593°E

Eaton
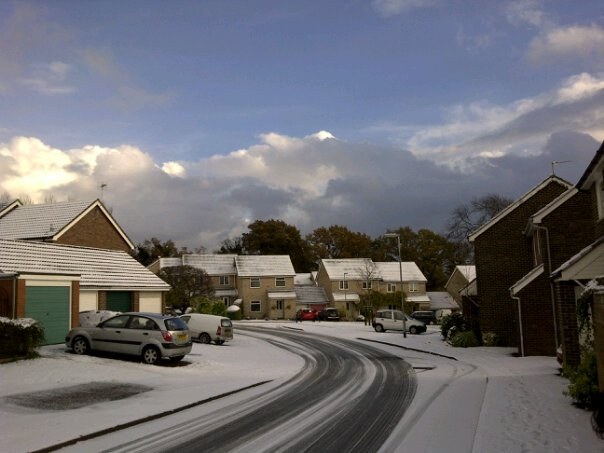
- Abinger Way in Eaton during the snows of 2010

- Location within Norfolk
- District: Norwich
- Shire county: Norfolk
- Region: East
- Country: England
- Sovereign state: United Kingdom
- Post town: NORWICH
- Postcode district: NR4
- Dialling code: 01603

Eaton is a suburb of the city of Norwich, in the Norwich district, in the county town of Norfolk, England.

Anciently the superiority of manor of Eaton, and its lands, was held by the FitzAlan family who in the reign of King Henry 1st granted it to the Priory and convent of Norwich. Their tenant in the second half of the 12th century, John de Grey, was father of Walter de Grey, Archbishop of York.

Eaton lies to the southwest of the city centre on the A11 road, the main route to London/Cambridge. It comprises:

- Eaton Village (around and immediately east of the junction of Bluebell Road, Church Lane and Newmarket Road)
- Eaton Rise - between the A140 Ipswich Road and Eaton golf club
- the area west of Eaton Park.

The population of the Norwich ward of Eaton was 8,781 at the 2011 Census.

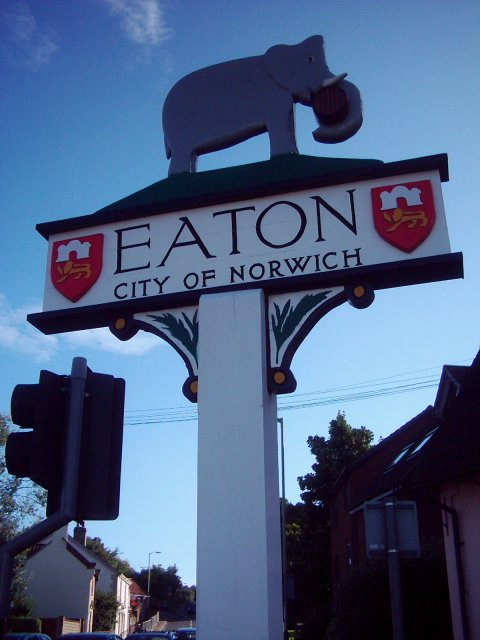
Village sign

The traditional-style painted wooden village sign, at the main road junction, was installed in 1956. It shows an elephant and a barrel, and is a play on words on the village's name, the elephant representing the syllable "E" and the barrel a "tun".

The village has two pubs, The Red Lion and The Cellar House. In 2016 the Post Office closed and was incorporated within The Cellar House.

St Andrew's Church in Eaton Village is the only thatched church within the City of Norwich, nearby is the more modern meetinghouse of the Church of Jesus Christ of Latter-day Saints.

Much of the area is relatively affluent, containing a large proportion of detached houses and many professional and retired residents. It is popular with employees at the nearby University of East Anglia. Along with neighbouring Cringleford it is often stereotyped as rich or snobbish by Norwich comedy duo The Nimmo Twins.

== Civil parish ==
In 1881 the parish had a population of 1237. On 25 March 1890 the parish (also called "Eaton St. Andrew") was abolished and merged with Norwich.

== Notable residents ==
Ayrton Senna lived in a two bedroom bungalow in Eaton.
