= Bowthorpe Ward, Norwich =

Electoral ward in Norwich, England

Bowthorpe Ward, Norwich is one of 13 wards in Norwich, each of which is represented by three City Councillors on Norwich City Council. It takes its name from the suburban village of Bowthorpe.
