= Gayton =

Gayton may refer to:

== Places ==
- Gayton, Merseyside
- Gayton, Norfolk
- Gayton, Northamptonshire
- Gayton, Staffordshire
- Gayton Engine, Lincolnshire
- Gayton le Marsh, Lincolnshire
- Gayton le Wold, Lincolnshire
- Gayton Thorpe, Norfolk

== People ==
- Gayton (surname)
- Gayton McKenzie, South African politician and businessman
- Gayton P. Osgood (1797–1861), American politician

== Other ==
- Gayton Hall, Norfolk
- Gayton House, one of the Houses of Harrow School
- Gayton Windmill (disambiguation)
