= Richard Toby Coke =

British politician

Norfolk County Councillor for Gayton & Nar Valley division
- In office 2 May 2013 – 4 May 2017
- Preceded by: Janet Murphy
- Succeeded by: Graham Middleton

Personal details
- Born: Richard Townshend Coke; 1 February 1954 (age 72) Weasenham, Norfolk
- Party: UK Independence Party
- Spouse: Carrie-Lee Early
- Education: Radley College

Richard Townshend Coke (born 1 February 1954), known as Toby Coke and as Richard Toby Coke, is an English landowner and forester who served as leader of the UK Independence Party group on Norfolk County Council from 2013 until 2017.

Born at Weasenham, near Great Massingham in Norfolk, Coke is the elder son of Major Richard Lovel Coke (1918–2001) and Molly (née Fletcher), a daughter of Walter Townshend Fletcher. His father was a grandson of Thomas Coke, 2nd Earl of Leicester (1822–1909). He was educated at Radley College and Sandhurst and commissioned into the Scots Guards. After four years in the army, he followed a financial services career in the City of London, before going to work in Canada and the United States. He returned to Norfolk to run the family estate, which consists largely of woodland, and now operates a training course at the Weasenham estate called "Extreeme Adventure."

A climate change denier, Coke has said he is

"fundamentally opposed to the climate change scam which is causing fuel poverty and the monstrous wind turbines that threaten so much of our most picturesque countryside."

At the Norfolk County Council election on 2 May 2013, Coke was elected to represent the Gayton and Nar Valley electoral division and a few days later was chosen as leader of the county council's UKIP group of fifteen councillors, making him "leader of the opposition". He stood down from his seat at the 2017 Norfolk County Council election.

Coke unsuccessfully contested Mid Norfolk for UKIP in 2010 and North West Norfolk for UKIP in 2015. He commented that before 2010 he had no involvement in politics apart from "dabbling in parish politics".

== Private life ==
On 19 November 1996 in the United States, Coke married Carrie-Lee Early, an attorney, the daughter of Neil Early, of New York.
