= Gayton Windmill =

Gayton Windmill may refer to a number of windmills in the United Kingdom.

- Gayton Windmill, a post mill which stood at TF 735 192
- Gayton Windmill, a tower mill which stands at TF 735 192
- Gayton Windmill SJ 278 812, a tower mill in present-day Merseyside

== See also ==
- Gayton (disambiguation)
