= Gayton (surname) =

Gayton is a surname, and may refer to:

- Albert Gayton (1840–1923), Canadian merchant and politician
- Anna Hadwick Gayton (1899–1977), American anthropologist, folklorist and museum curator
- Clark Gayton, American musician
- Clark Gayton (1712–1785), British Royal Navy Officer
- Edmund Gayton (1608–1666), English academic, physician and author
- Howard Gayton, a founder of the Ophaboom Theatre Company
- Joe Gayton (c. 1956/1957–2023), American writer, director and producer
- Tony Gayton, American film producer and screenwriter
