= 2017 Norfolk County Council election =

2017 UK local government election

- 4 May 2017

All 84 seats to Norfolk County Council 43 seats needed for a majority

	First party	Second party	Third party
Leader	Cliff Jordan	George Nobbs	Marie Strong
Party	Conservative	Labour	Liberal Democrats
Leader since	March 2015	June 2009	May 2013
Leader's seat	Yare & All Saints	Crome	Wells
Last election	40 seats, 32.6%	14 seats, 22.8%	10 seats, 11.0%
Seats before	42	14	10
Seats won	55	17	11
Seat change	▲15	▲3	▲1
Popular vote	114,038	54,231	40,680
Percentage	48.8%	23.2%	17.4%
Swing	▲16.2%	▲0.4%	▲6.4%
	Fourth party	Fifth party
Leader	Richard Toby Coke	Richard Bearman
Party	UKIP	Green
Leader since	May 2013	10 January 2012
Leader's seat	Gayton & Nar Valley (Retiring)	Mancroft (Retiring)
Last election	15 seats, 23.5%	4 seats, 6.6%
Seats before	12	3
Seats won	0	0
Seat change	▼15	▼4
Popular vote	14,078	9,316
Percentage	6.0%	4.0%
Swing	▼17.5%	▼2.6%
- Map showing the results of the 2017 Norfolk County Council elections.
Council control before election
No Overall Control
Council control after election
Conservative Party

The 2017 Norfolk County Council election took place on 4 May 2017 as part of the 2017 local elections in the United Kingdom.

The Conservative Party won control of the council from No Overall Control.

All three major parties made gains at the expense of the UK Independence Party and the Green Party of England and Wales, both of which lost all their seats. The Conservatives benefited the most, making a net gain of 15 seats from UKIP and the Liberal Democrats, while Labour bucked its national trend of poor results and made a net gain of 3 seats. The Liberal Democrats saw their seat number rise from 10 to 11, winning one off UKIP. An independent candidate was also elected.

This was the first election since 2001 in which no UKIP or Green candidates were elected. The election saw significant changes in the popular vote, with UKIP's vote share declining by 17.5 percentage points and the Green Party winning just 4% of the county-wide vote, its worst result in Norfolk since the 1997 election.

== Previous composition ==
=== 2013 election ===
Party	Seats
Conservative	40
UKIP	15
Labour	14
Liberal Democrats	10
Green	4
Independent	1
Total	84

=== Composition of council seats before election ===
Party	Seats
Conservative	42
Labour	14
UKIP	12
Liberal Democrats	10
Green	3
Independent	3
Total	84

=== Changes between elections ===
In between the 2013 election and the 2017 election, the following council seats changed hands:

Division	Date	Previous Party	New Party	Cause	Resulting Council Composition					
Division	Date	Previous Party	New Party	Cause	Con	UKIP	Lab	LDem	Grn	Ind
Thorpe Hamlet	9 December 2016	Green	Conservative	Sitting Green Councillor defected to Conservatives.	42	12	14	10	3	3
Watton	19 November 2015	UKIP	Conservative	UKIP incumbent resigned. Conservatives won by-election.	41	12	14	10	4	3
Dersingham	24 July 2015	Conservative	Independent	Councillor quit party to sit as independent member.	40	13	14	10	4	3
Gorleston St Andrews	16 July 2015	UKIP	Conservative	UKIP incumbent resigned. Conservatives won by-election.	41	13	14	10	4	2
Clenchwarton and King's Lynn South	27 February 2014	Labour	Independent	Councillor quit party to sit as an independent member.	40	14	14	10	4	2
Thetford West	1 August 2013	UKIP	Labour	UKIP incumbent resigned. Labour won by-election.	40	14	15	10	4	1

The leadership of the Council also changed from 2013. In May 2016, a Leadership election saw George Nobbs (Labour) removed as Council Leader and replaced with Cliff Jordan (Conservative). The vote was 41 for Cliff Jordan and 37 for George Nobbs.

== Results summary ==
Norfolk County Council election results 2017
Party	Seats	Gains	Losses	Net gain/loss	Seats %	Votes %	Votes	+/−
Conservative	55	17	2	+15	65.5	48.8	114,038	+16.2
Labour	17	6	3	+3	20.2	23.2	54,231	+0.4
Liberal Democrats	11	4	3	+1	13.1	17.4	40,680	+6.4
UKIP	0	0	15	-15	—	6.0	14,078	-17.5
Green	0	0	4	-4	—	4.0	9,316	-2.6
Independent	1	1	1	0	1.2	0.7	1,526	-2.8
Total	84						233,869	

=== Election of Party Leaders ===
Cliff Jordan (Yare and All Saints) was re-elected leader of the Conservative Group. Steve Morphew (Catton Grove) challenged the incumbent group leader George Nobbs (Crome) for the leadership of the Labour Group and won. Marie Strong (Wells) who had been leader of the Liberal Democrat group, stood down and was replaced by Dan Roper (Hevingham and Spixworth) (with newly elected Steffan Aquarone (Melton Constable) as deputy leader of the group).

=== Election of Leader of the Council ===
Leader of the Conservative group, Cliff Jordan was re-elected Leader of the Council, and was able to form a majority Conservative administration.

He stood down in May 2018 after being diagnosed with lung cancer, and was replaced in June by Andrew Proctor (Blofield & Brundall), with Graham Plant (Gorleston St Andrews) replacing Alison Thomas (Long Stratton) as Deputy Leader. Less than a month after stepping down as Leader, Cliff Jordan died on 9 June.

== Candidates and results by division ==
=== Breckland ===
District Summary

Party	Seats	+/-	Votes	%	+/-
Conservative	11	▲4	20,470	63.2	+26.3
Labour	1	▲1	7,332	22.6	+4.0
Liberal Democrat	0	Steady	2,456	7.6	+4.8
UKIP	0	▼5	1,476	4.6	−30.3
Green	0	Steady	671	2.1	−1.4

Division Results

Attleborough
Party	Candidate	Votes	%	±%
Conservative	Rhodri Oliver	1,685	63.5	+24.5
Labour	Phil Spiby	632	23.8	+1.1
Liberal Democrats	Christopher MacKinnon	338	12.7	+7.0
Majority		1,053	39.7	+3.6
Turnout		2,655	28.4	−3.7
Conservative hold		Swing	+11.7	

Dereham North
Party	Candidate	Votes	%	±%
Conservative	William Richmond *	1,512	65.3	+27.4
Labour	Liz Hunton	478	20.7	+1.0
Green	Ann Bowyer	205	8.9	−0.5
Liberal Democrats	Erlend Watson	120	5.2	+5.2
Majority		1,034	44.7	+39.8
Turnout		2,315	29.2	−1.5
Conservative hold		Swing	+13.2	

Dereham South
Party	Candidate	Votes	%	±%
Conservative	Phillip Duigan	1,179	46.9	+18.5
Labour	Harry Clarke	853	33.9	+12.3
UKIP	Catherine Blaiklock	277	11.0	−24.8
Liberal Democrats	Paul Speed	207	8.2	+0.9
Majority		326	13.0	+5.5
Turnout		2,516	28.8	+1.1
Conservative gain from UKIP		Swing	+21.7	

Elmham & Mattishall
Party	Candidate	Votes	%	±%
Conservative	Bill Borrett *	2,231	71.0	+22.2
Labour	Linda Goreham	585	18.6	−0.7
Liberal Democrats	Richard Scoggins	326	10.4	+10.4
Majority		1,646	52.4	+35.5
Turnout		3,142	34.92	+3.4
Conservative hold		Swing	+11.4	

Guiltcross
Party	Candidate	Votes	%	±%
Conservative	Stephen Askew *	2,067	69.0	+25.3
Liberal Democrats	Stephen Gordon	472	15.7	−1.1
Labour	Christopher Harvey	459	15.3	+2.4
Majority		1,595	53.2	+36.3
Turnout		2,998	35.6	+4.3
Conservative hold		Swing	+13.2	

Necton & Launditch
Party	Candidate	Votes	%	±%
Conservative	Mark Kiddle-Morris *	2,477	74.7	+37.4
Labour	Joe Sisto	838	25.3	+6.9
Majority		1,639	49.4	+36.1
Turnout		3,315	37.9	+1.4
Conservative hold		Swing	+34.1	

Swaffham
Party	Candidate	Votes	%	±%
Conservative	Ed Colman	1,577	59.4	+19.4
UKIP	Paul Smyth *	473	17.8	−26.7
Labour	Philip Wagstaff	391	14.7	−0.8
Liberal Democrats	Kate Sayer	215	8.1	+8.1
Majority		1,104	41.6	+37.1
Turnout		2,656	33.1	+2.9
Conservative gain from UKIP		Swing	+23.0	

The Brecks
Party	Candidate	Votes	%	±%
Conservative	Fabian Eagle	2,131	72.0	+29.1
Labour	Brenda Canham	355	12.0	+1.7
Green	Sandra Elizabeth Walmsley	250	8.4	+1.8
Liberal Democrats	James Minto	225	7.6	+7.6
Majority		1,776	60.0	+54.1
Turnout		2,961	33.3	−0.2
Conservative hold		Swing	+13.7	

Thetford East
Party	Candidate	Votes	%	±%
Conservative	Roy Brame	982	48.1	+21.8
Labour	Mike Brindle	725	35.5	+16.6
UKIP	Denis Crawford *	334	16.4	−30.6
Majority		257	12.6	−8.1
Turnout		2041	27.1	+2.7
Conservative gain from UKIP		Swing	+26.2	

Thetford West
Party	Candidate	Votes	%	±%
Labour Co-op	Terry Jermy *	1,323	51.5	+16.2
Conservative	Jane James	853	33.2	+17.9
UKIP	John Newton	392	15.3	−20.1
Majority		470	18.3	+18.3
Turnout		2,568	26.8	+3.0
Labour gain from UKIP		Swing	+18.2	

Watton
Party	Candidate	Votes	%	±%
Conservative	Claire Bowes *	1,785	71.4	+43.9
Labour	Danielle Glavin	356	14.2	+3.0
Green	Timothy Birt	216	8.6	+4.4
Liberal Democrats	Victor Scrivens	144	5.8	+5.8
Majority		1,429	57.1	+51.1
Turnout		2,501	28.5	+0.5
Conservative gain from UKIP		Swing	+20.4	

Yare & All Saints
Party	Candidate	Votes	%	±%
Conservative	Cliff Jordan *	1,991	72.7	+28.7
Liberal Democrats	Christine McLean	409	14.9	+14.9
Labour	Paul Siegert	337	12.3	−5.0
Majority		1,582	57.8	+52.4
Turnout		2,737	35.7	+3.5
Conservative hold		Swing	+6.9	

=== Broadland ===
District Summary

Party	Seats	+/-	Votes	%	+/-
Conservative	11	▲1	19,619	55.4	+17.6
Liberal Democrat	2	▼1	6,908	19.5	+3.8
Labour	0	Steady	7,021	19.8	+1.4
UKIP	0	Steady	1,551	4.4	−20.0
Green	0	Steady	329	0.9	−1.0

Division Results

Acle
Party	Candidate	Votes	%	±%
Conservative	Brian Iles *	1,343	52.3	+12.2
Labour	Thomas Rednall	756	29.5	+7.6
Liberal Democrats	Michael Blake	249	9.7	+4.6
UKIP	David Moreland	219	8.5	−24.4
Majority		587	22.9	+15.7
Turnout		2,567	37.8	+5.7
Conservative hold		Swing	+2.3	

Aylsham
Party	Candidate	Votes	%	±%
Liberal Democrats	David Harrison *	1,358	43.7	+3.0
Conservative	Hal Turkmen	1,221	39.3	+13.5
Labour	Simon Court	389	12.5	+0.7
UKIP	Trevor Gardiner	142	4.6	−17.3
Majority		137	4.4	−10.5
Turnout		3,110	39.7	+1.4
Liberal Democrats hold		Swing	−5.3	

Blofield & Brundall
Party	Candidate	Votes	%	±%
Conservative	Andrew Proctor *	1,818	62.7	+16.4
Labour	Alan Pawsey	479	16.5	−4.5
Liberal Democrats	Eleanor Mason	284	9.8	+5.2
Green	Beth Davis	167	5.8	−3.3
UKIP	Armin Hess	154	5.3	−13.7
Majority		1,339	46.1	+20.9
Turnout		2,902	38.5	+3.3
Conservative hold		Swing	+10.4	

Drayton & Horsford
Party	Candidate	Votes	%	±%
Conservative	Tony Adams *	1,452	63.4	+23.7
Liberal Democrats	Peter Sergeant	486	21.2	+11.4
Labour	Tony Hemmingway	352	15.4	−4.4
Majority		966	42.2	+33.0
Turnout		2,290	28.1	+1.2
Conservative hold		Swing	+6.2	

Hellesdon
Party	Candidate	Votes	%	±%
Conservative	Shelagh Gurney *	1,683	61.5	+21.9
Labour	Annie Thompson	681	24.9	+7.4
Liberal Democrats	David Britcher	374	13.7	+5.6
Majority		1,002	36.6	+26.4
Turnout		2,738	31.4	−0.4
Conservative hold		Swing	+7.3	

Hevingham & Spixworth
Party	Candidate	Votes	%	±%
Liberal Democrats	Daniel Roper *	1,297	47.2	+10.6
Conservative	Shaun Vincent	1,068	38.8	+9.6
Labour	Philip Williams	221	8.0	−1.9
UKIP	Nancy Gardiner	164	6.0	−18.3
Majority		229	8.3	+1.0
Turnout		2,750	37.4	+4.6
Liberal Democrats hold		Swing	+0.5	

Old Catton
Party	Candidate	Votes	%	±%
Conservative	Karen Vincent	1,356	65.1	+28.3
Labour	Nesar Ahmed	418	20.1	+2.1
Liberal Democrats	Jacky Howe	310	14.9	−1.9
Majority		938	45.0	+31.2
Turnout		2,084	31.7	−1.4
Conservative hold		Swing	+13.1	

Reepham
Party	Candidate	Votes	%	±%
Conservative	Greg Peck	1,231	44.2	+12.9
Liberal Democrats	Stuart Beadle	783	28.1	−5.5
Labour	Ruth Goodall	611	22.0	+9.2
UKIP	Paul Brock	158	5.7	−16.6
Majority		448	16.1	+13.9
Turnout		2,783	41.5	+6.6
Conservative gain from Liberal Democrats		Swing	+9.2	

Sprowston
Party	Candidate	Votes	%	±%
Conservative	John Ward *	1,659	54.0	+20.2
Labour	Bill Couzens	920	30.0	+0.4
Liberal Democrats	Martin Callam	258	8.4	−1.1
UKIP	John Gilson	234	7.6	−19.6
Majority		739	24.1	+19.8
Turnout		3,071	32.9	−1.1
Conservative hold		Swing	+9.9	

Taverham
Party	Candidate	Votes	%	±%
Conservative	Stuart Clancy *	1,751	66.8	+11.3
Labour	Trevor Turk	428	16.3	+5.0
Liberal Democrats	Charles Ison	285	10.9	+2.0
UKIP	Ian Kelly	158	6.0	−18.3
Majority		1,324	50.5	+19.3
Turnout		2,622	34.3	+1.8
Conservative hold		Swing	+3.1	

Thorpe St Andrew
Party	Candidate	Votes	%	±%
Conservative	Ian Mackie *	1,799	63.1	+16.4
Labour	Dariush Fassihi	649	22.8	−0.6
Liberal Democrats	Phyllida Scrivens	404	14.2	+6.6
Majority		1,150	40.3	+17.0
Turnout		2,852	36.1	+4.8
Conservative hold		Swing	+8.5	

Woodside
Party	Candidate	Votes	%	±%
Conservative	John Fisher	1,494	55.3	+16.5
Labour	Natasha Harpley	802	29.7	−2.7
Liberal Democrats	Dave Thomas	232	8.6	+3.2
UKIP	Ean Newberry	174	6.4	−16.9
Majority		692	25.6	+19.1
Turnout		2,702	39.1	+2.9
Conservative hold		Swing	+9.6	

Wroxham
Party	Candidate	Votes	%	±%
Conservative	Tom Garrod *	1,744	59.0	+27.1
Liberal Democrats	Stephen Heard	588	19.9	+1.2
Labour	Christine Hemmingway	315	10.7	−0.4
Green	Nick Ball	162	5.5	+5.5
UKIP	Adrian Wymer	148	5.0	−14.1
Majority		1,156	39.1	+26.5
Turnout		2,957	36.7	+1.0
Conservative hold		Swing	+13.0	

=== Great Yarmouth ===
District Summary

Party	Seats	+/-	Votes	%	+/-
Conservative	6	▲5	9,918	44.9	+16.8
Labour	3	Steady	6,342	28.7	−5.4
UKIP	0	▼5	5,026	22.7	−13.6
Green	0	Steady	430	2.0	+1.4
Liberal Democrat	0	Steady	385	1.7	+1.1

Division Results

Breydon
Party	Candidate	Votes	%	±%
Conservative	Carl Smith	1,289	47.7	+18.4
Labour	Trevor Wainwright	795	29.4	−4.3
UKIP	Alan Grey *	619	22.9	−14.1
Majority		494	18.2	+14.9
Turnout		2,703	31.0	+1.7
Conservative gain from UKIP		Swing	+16.3	

Caister-on-Sea
Party	Candidate	Votes	%	±%
Conservative	Penny Carpenter	1,177	49.8	+22.6
UKIP	Donna Hammond	551	23.3	−8.5
Labour	Christina Horne	467	19.8	−14.9
Green	Harry Webb	168	7.1	+2.6
Majority		626	26.5	+23.6
Turnout		2,363	31.6	−3.4
Conservative gain from Labour		Swing	+18.7	

East Flegg
Party	Candidate	Votes	%	±%
Conservative	Ron Hanton	1,529	54.4	+16.4
UKIP	Jonathon Childs *	714	25.4	−16.4
Labour	John Simmons	413	14.7	−5.7
Green	Ken Petersen	157	5.6	+5.6
Majority		815	29.0	+25.2
Turnout		2,813	36.9	+4.1
Conservative gain from UKIP		Swing	+16.4	

Gorleston St Andrews
Party	Candidate	Votes	%	±%
Conservative	Graham Plant *	1,145	46.1	+18.7
Labour	Tony Wright	834	33.6	−2.3
UKIP	Kay Grey	401	16.1	−20.6
Green	Tracey Darnell	105	4.2	+4.2
Majority		311	12.5	+11.7
Turnout		2,485	32.4	−0.8
Conservative gain from UKIP		Swing	+19.6	

Lothingland
Party	Candidate	Votes	%	±%
Conservative	Andy Grant	1,331	47.5	+12.8
UKIP	Carl Annison	800	28.5	−9.1
Labour	Cara Walker	673	24.0	−3.7
Majority		531	18.9	+16.0
Turnout		2,804	31.1	+1.6
Conservative gain from UKIP		Swing	+11.0	

Magdalen
Party	Candidate	Votes	%	±%
Labour	Colleen Walker *	1,062	48.0	−0.0
Conservative	Julia Miller	739	33.4	+14.9
UKIP	John Ellerton	413	18.7	−14.8
Majority		323	14.6	+0.1
Turnout		2,214	27.2	−1.7
Labour hold		Swing	−7.5	

West Flegg
Party	Candidate	Votes	%	±%
Conservative	Haydn Thirtle	1,380	62.5	+21.9
Labour	Gary Boyd	384	17.4	−10.1
UKIP	Michael Toomey	266	12.0	−19.8
Liberal Democrats	Kim Mackenzie-Morris	178	8.1	+8.1
Majority		996	45.1	+36.3
Turnout		2,208	35.3	+1.2
Conservative hold		Swing	+16.0	

Yarmouth Nelson & Southtown
Party	Candidate	Votes	%	±%
Labour	Mike Smith-Clare	843	42.7	+1.2
UKIP	Peter Fitzgerald	562	28.5	−13.6
Conservative	George Rogers	492	24.9	+11.1
Liberal Democrats	Lisa Alston	78	3.9	+3.9
Majority		281	14.2	+13.7
Turnout		1,975	21.5	−0.3
Labour gain from UKIP		Swing	+7.4	

Yarmouth North & Central
Party	Candidate	Votes	%	±%
Labour	Mick Castle *	871	34.4	−4.2
Conservative	James William Bensly	836	33.0	+10.5
UKIP	Chris Walch	700	27.6	−7.6
Liberal Democrats	Tony Harris	129	5.1	+1.3
Majority		35	1.4	−1.9
Turnout		2,536	27.7	−0.2
Labour hold		Swing	−7.4	

=== King's Lynn and West Norfolk ===
District Summary

Party	Seats	+/-	Votes	%	+/-
Conservative	12	▲5	20,355	58.4	+22.7
Labour	1	▼2	6,857	19.7	−4.2
Independent	1	Steady	1,252	3.6	−6.6
Liberal Democrat	0	Steady	3,376	9.7	+6.5
UKIP	0	▼3	2,563	7.4	−17.1
Green	0	Steady	483	1.4	−0.9

Division Results

Clenchwarton & King's Lynn South
Party	Candidate	Votes	%	±%
Independent	Alexandra Kemp†	1,181	52.6	+52.6
Conservative	Chris Crofts	616	27.4	+0.6
Labour	Deborah Holman	317	14.1	−29.9
UKIP	Trevor Roberts	132	5.9	−23.2
Majority		565	25.2	+10.2
Turnout		2,246	28.8	−0.3
Independent gain from Labour		Swing	+41.3	

†Alexandra Kemp was elected as a Labour councillor for Clenchwarton & King's Lynn South in September 2012 and reelected in May 2013, but left the party on 27 February 2014 to sit as an independent councillor.

Dersingham
Party	Candidate	Votes	%	±%
Conservative	Stuart Dark	2,445	73.5	+26.9
Labour	Edward Robb	530	15.9	−4.6
Liberal Democrats	Harry Lane	352	10.6	+5.4
Majority		1,915	57.6	+38.6
Turnout		3,327	37.2	+2.2
Conservative hold		Swing	+15.8	

Docking
Party	Candidate	Votes	%	±%
Conservative	Michael Chenery of Horsbrugh *	1,856	68.6	+26.0
Labour	Adrianne Lake	498	18.4	−1.2
Liberal Democrats	David Mills	351	13.0	+13.0
Majority		1,358	50.2	+45.5
Turnout		2,705	34.1	+0.7
Conservative hold		Swing	+13.6	

Downham Market
Party	Candidate	Votes	%	±%
Conservative	Tony White *	1,677	60.8	+24.5
Labour	Jackie Crookston	405	14.7	−6.9
Liberal Democrats	Josie Ratcliffe	368	13.3	+13.3
UKIP	Dave Williams	309	11.2	−20.8
Majority		1,272	46.1	+41.8
Turnout		2,759	32.2	+1.4
Conservative hold		Swing	+15.7	

Feltwell
Party	Candidate	Votes	%	±%
Conservative	Martin Storey *	2,009	68.3	+23.7
Labour	Peter Wortley	659	22.4	+5.4
Liberal Democrats	John Crofts	273	9.3	+9.3
Majority		1,350	45.9	+39.7
Turnout		2,941	30.4	+0.2
Conservative hold		Swing	+9.1	

Fincham
Party	Candidate	Votes	%	±%
Conservative	Brian Long *	1,640	59.3	+20.7
Labour	Samantha Gipson	470	17.0	−4.7
UKIP	Ashley Collins	361	13.1	−21.0
Liberal Democrats	Carol Renard	294	10.6	+4.9
Majority		1,170	42.3	+37.7
Turnout		2,765	31.7	+1.7
Conservative hold		Swing	+12.7	

Freebridge Lynn
Party	Candidate	Votes	%	±%
Conservative	Simon Eyre	1,535	57.2	+23.8
Green	Andrew de Whalley	483	18.0	−10.2
Labour	Wilfred Lambert	353	13.2	−1.0
Liberal Democrats	Simon Wells	182	6.8	+4.0
UKIP	Christine Perkins	130	4.9	−16.6
Majority		1,052	39.2	+34.0
Turnout		2,683	35.3	−1.0
Conservative hold		Swing	+17.0	

Gayton & Nar Valley
Party	Candidate	Votes	%	±%
Conservative	Graham Middleton	1,577	61.8	+42.0
Labour	Natasha Morgan	460	18.0	+10.8
Liberal Democrats	Andrew Nixon	289	11.3	−2.0
UKIP	John Corden	226	8.9	−19.5
Majority		1,117	43.8	+41.6
Turnout		2,552	30.4	−3.2
Conservative gain from UKIP		Swing	+30.7	

Gaywood North & Central
Party	Candidate	Votes	%	±%
Conservative	Sheila Young	871	45.6	+21.2
Labour	John Collop	621	32.5	+0.6
UKIP	Jim Perkins *	226	11.8	−23.8
Liberal Democrats	Ian Swinton	120	6.3	−1.8
Independent	Patrick Rochford	71	3.7	+3.7
Majority		250	13.1	+9.4
Turnout		1,909	25.4	−1.0
Conservative gain from UKIP		Swing	+22.5	

Gaywood South
Party	Candidate	Votes	%	±%
Conservative	Thomas Smith	857	38.7	+17.8
Labour	Margaret Wilkinson *	758	34.2	−3.2
Liberal Democrats	Robert Colwell	370	16.7	+9.0
UKIP	Michael Stone	230	10.4	−23.6
Majority		99	4.5	+1.0
Turnout		2,215	22.3	−0.5
Conservative gain from Labour		Swing	+10.5	

King's Lynn North & Central
Party	Candidate	Votes	%	±%
Labour	David Collis *	716	46.6	−26.0
Conservative	Toby Wing-Pentelow	470	30.6	+3.2
UKIP	Matthew Hannay	198	12.9	+12.9
Liberal Democrats	Richard Coward	153	10.0	+10.0
Majority		246	16.0	−29.2
Turnout		1,537	19.4	+1.3
Labour hold		Swing	−14.6	

Marshland North
Party	Candidate	Votes	%	±%
Conservative	Sandra Squire	1,344	71.3	+40.6
Labour	Izik Kruh-Atar	331	17.6	+1.9
Liberal Democrats	Erika Coward	211	11.2	+11.2
Majority		1,013	53.7	+47.3
Turnout		1,886	23.9	−2.6
Conservative gain from UKIP		Swing	+19.3	

Marshland South
Party	Candidate	Votes	%	±%
Conservative	Harry Humphrey *	1,567	60.0	−5.5
UKIP	Colin Rose	541	20.7	+20.7
Labour	Robin Mann	344	13.2	−21.3
Liberal Democrats	Steven White	158	6.1	+6.1
Majority		1,026	39.3	+8.2
Turnout		2,610	25.0	+3.5
Conservative hold		Swing	−13.1	

North Coast
Party	Candidate	Votes	%	±%
Conservative	Andrew Jamieson	1,891	68.7	+34.6
Labour	Christine Hudson	395	14.4	+4.8
Liberal Democrats	Simon Wilson	255	9.3	+9.3
UKIP	Deborah le May	210	7.6	−8.6
Majority		1,496	54.4	+48.5
Turnout		2751	38.1	+0.4
Conservative gain from Independent		Swing	+14.9	

=== North Norfolk ===
District Summary

Party	Seats	+/-	Votes	%	+/-
Liberal Democrat	7	▲2	13,986	41.7	+16.0
Conservative	4	Steady	13,168	39.3	+12.4
Labour	0	Steady	3,306	9.9	−6.2
UKIP	0	▼2	1,909	5.7	−19.9
Green	0	Steady	1,027	3.1	−0.7
Independent	0	Steady	109	0.3	−0.7

Division Results

Cromer
Party	Candidate	Votes	%	±%
Liberal Democrats	Timothy Adams	1,481	44.6	+26.6
Conservative	Hilary Cox *	1,310	39.4	+4.8
Labour	Jane Worsdale	255	7.7	−9.3
UKIP	John Digby	153	4.6	−20.1
Green	Michael Bossingham	123	3.7	−0.2
Majority		171	5.1	−4.8
Turnout		3,322	40.9	+1.4
Liberal Democrats gain from Conservative		Swing	+10.9	

Fakenham
Party	Candidate	Votes	%	±%
Conservative	Tom Fitzpatrick *	1,321	52.6	+20.8
Liberal Democrats	Hugh Lanham	556	22.1	+11.8
Labour	Imogen Bruce	352	14.0	−12.9
UKIP	Jack Smith	202	8.0	−18.5
Green	Jenny Outred	80	3.2	−1.2
Majority		765	30.5	+25.6
Turnout		2,511	30.69	+1.0
Conservative hold		Swing	+4.5	

Holt
Party	Candidate	Votes	%	±%
Liberal Democrats	Sarah Butikofer	1,666	45.6	+23.1
Conservative	David Ward	1,455	39.8	+13.6
Labour	Richard Kelham	210	5.7	−4.8
UKIP	Terry Comber	202	5.5	−29.9
Green	Paula d'Attoma	123	3.4	−2.0
Majority		211	5.8	−3.5
Turnout		3,656	50.5	−0.3
Liberal Democrats gain from UKIP		Swing	+26.5	

Hoveton & Stalham
Party	Candidate	Votes	%	±%
Conservative	Nigel Dixon *	1,540	59.8	+28.1
Liberal Democrats	Philip Livesey	616	23.9	+4.1
Labour	Mandy McKenna	301	11.7	−9.4
Green	Michael Macartney-Filgate	119	4.6	+1.5
Majority		924	35.9	+28.6
Turnout		2,576	35.1	−1.6
Conservative hold		Swing	+12.0	

Melton Constable
Party	Candidate	Votes	%	±%
Liberal Democrats	Steffan Aquarone	1,549	44.9	+33.8
Conservative	Annie Claussen-Reynolds	1,129	32.7	+3.2
UKIP	David Ramsbotham *	409	11.9	−23.8
Labour	Callum Ringer	283	8.2	−9.5
Green	Alicia Hull	80	2.3	−3.7
Majority		420	12.2	+6.0
Turnout		3,450	46.1	+3.4
Liberal Democrats gain from UKIP		Swing	+28.8	

Mundesley
Party	Candidate	Votes	%	±%
Liberal Democrats	Edward Maxfield	1,309	42.5	+21.9
Conservative	Fiona Turner	1,244	40.4	+14.2
Labour	Ray Mooney	240	7.8	−1.2
UKIP	Alexander Wood	177	5.8	−16.3
Independent	Graham Jones	109	3.5	−6.5
Majority		65	2.1	−2.1
Turnout		3,079	41.5	+2.7
Liberal Democrats gain from Conservative		Swing	+3.9	

North Walsham East
Party	Candidate	Votes	%	±%
Liberal Democrats	Eric Seward *	1,646	54.5	+19.4
Conservative	Alex Oliver	829	27.5	+11.0
Labour	Jacqui Cross	261	8.6	−12.6
UKIP	Lynette Comber	177	5.9	−17.3
Green	Jo Todd	107	3.5	−0.5
Majority		817	27.1	+15.1
Turnout		3,020	35.4	+0.5
Liberal Democrats hold		Swing	+4.2	

North Walsham West & Erpingham
Party	Candidate	Votes	%	±%
Liberal Democrats	John Timewell *	1,037	34.5	+6.3
Conservative	Glyn Williams	926	30.8	+10.0
Labour Co-op	David Spencer	789	26.3	−0.6
UKIP	Irene Ramsbotham	141	4.7	−14.5
Green	Stephen Green	113	3.8	−1.2
Majority		111	3.7	+2.3
Turnout		3,006	41.8	+2.5
Liberal Democrats hold		Swing	−1.9	

Sheringham
Party	Candidate	Votes	%	±%
Conservative	Judy Oliver	1,380	46.0	+17.2
Liberal Democrats	Helen Dalton-Hare	1,155	38.5	+1.8
Labour	Sue Brisbane	270	9.0	−3.2
UKIP	Steven de la Salle	138	4.6	−14.3
Green	Julian Drury	56	1.9	−1.4
Majority		225	7.5	−0.4
Turnout		2,999	44.1	+1.1
Conservative gain from Liberal Democrats		Swing	+7.7	

South Smallburgh
Party	Candidate	Votes	%	±%
Conservative	Richard Price	1,252	42.2	+12.8
Liberal Democrats	Eric Stockton	1,196	40.3	+9.7
UKIP	Michael Baker	204	6.9	−19.9
Labour	David Russell	165	5.6	−4.0
Green	Anne Filgate	152	5.1	+1.4
Majority		56	1.9	+0.9
Turnout		2,969	41.6	+1.5
Conservative gain from Liberal Democrats		Swing	+1.6	

Wells
Party	Candidate	Votes	%	±%
Liberal Democrats	Marie Strong *	1,775	60.9	+11.9
Conservative	Becky Palmer	782	26.8	+6.4
Labour	Stephen Burke	180	6.2	−1.3
UKIP	John Dymond	106	3.6	−15.9
Green	Kara Betts	74	2.5	−1.1
Majority		993	34.0	+5.4
Turnout		2,917	43.3	+1.4
Liberal Democrats hold		Swing	+2.7	

=== Norwich ===
District Summary

Party	Seats	+/-	Votes	%	+/-
Labour	12	▲4	16,829	45.7	+6.3
Liberal Democrat	1	Steady	4,061	11.0	+0.3
Conservative	0	Steady	8,138	22.1	+4.8
Green	0	▼4	6,073	16.5	−10.5
UKIP	0	Steady	1,553	4.2	−1.4
Independent	0	Steady	165	0.5	+0.5

Division Results

Bowthorpe
Party	Candidate	Votes	%	±%
Labour	Mike Sands *	1,175	50.0	−0.6
Conservative	Henry Newton	710	30.2	+0.3
UKIP	Michelle Newton	170	7.2	+7.2
Green	Nannette Youssef	170	7.2	−7.9
Liberal Democrats	Silvia Schmidtova	124	5.3	+1.0
Majority		465	19.8	−0.9
Turnout		2,349	29.0	+1.8
Labour hold		Swing	−0.5	

Catton Grove
Party	Candidate	Votes	%	±%
Labour	Steve Morphew *	1,194	47.7	+3.8
Conservative	Daniel Elmer	955	38.2	+18.8
Green	Tony Park	169	6.8	−2.9
Liberal Democrats	Leigh Tooke	114	4.6	−0.0
Independent	Michelle Ho	70	2.8	−19.7
Majority		239	9.6	−11.9
Turnout		2,502	31.2	+4.1
Labour hold		Swing	−7.5	

Crome
Party	Candidate	Votes	%	±%
Labour	George Nobbs *	1,151	49.9	+0.7
Conservative	Jonathan Emsell	743	32.2	+16.4
UKIP	Ann Williams	171	7.4	−16.1
Green	Judith Ford	147	6.4	−1.7
Liberal Democrats	Ian Leach	93	4.0	+0.7
Majority		408	17.7	−8.1
Turnout		2,305	31.8	+2.3
Labour hold		Swing	−7.9	

Eaton
Party	Candidate	Votes	%	±%
Liberal Democrats	Brian Watkins *	1,833	46.5	+5.2
Conservative	William Robb	1,107	28.1	−1.1
Labour	Ian Stutely	683	17.3	−1.0
Green	Jane Saunders	244	6.2	−5.0
UKIP	Gordon Cullingworth	73	1.9	+1.9
Majority		726	18.4	+6.4
Turnout		3,940	53.8	+5.1
Liberal Democrats hold		Swing	+3.2	

Lakenham
Party	Candidate	Votes	%	±%
Labour Co-op	Brenda Jones	1,249	50.3	−0.3
Conservative	Sherman Langendijk	467	18.8	+7.4
Liberal Democrats	Emily Cutler	277	11.2	−12.6
Green	Paul Neale	250	10.1	−4.2
UKIP	Eric Masters	240	9.7	+9.7
Majority		782	31.5	+4.6
Turnout		2,483	34.8	+3.7
Labour hold		Swing	−3.9	

Mancroft
Party	Candidate	Votes	%	±%
Labour	Danny Douglas	1,355	46.5	+11.0
Green	Martin Schmierer	704	24.2	−20.6
Conservative	Samantha England	522	17.9	+5.1
Liberal Democrats	Gordon Dean	201	6.9	+0.0
UKIP	Paddy Ball	130	4.5	+4.5
Majority		651	22.4	+13.2
Turnout		2,912	35.9	+4.1
Labour gain from Green		Swing	+15.8	

Mile Cross
Party	Candidate	Votes	%	±%
Labour Co-op	Chrissie Rumsby *	998	48.8	+4.2
Conservative	Alex Jackson-Dennis	454	22.2	+11.6
Green	Lisa Shaw	206	10.1	−11.2
UKIP	David Rowell	162	7.9	−11.5
Liberal Democrats	Magda Siwiec	131	6.4	+2.2
Independent	Deborah Gihawi	95	4.6	+4.6
Majority		544	26.6	+3.2
Turnout		2,046	26.6	+0.5
Labour hold		Swing	−3.7	

Nelson
Party	Candidate	Votes	%	±%
Labour	Jess Barnard	1,735	47.3	+16.1
Green	Tim Jones	1,372	37.4	−16.6
Liberal Democrats	David Fairbairn	279	7.6	+1.7
Conservative	William Richardson	258	7.0	−1.9
UKIP	John Youles	27	0.7	+0.7
Majority		363	9.9	−12.9
Turnout		3,671	54.2	+19.9
Labour gain from Green		Swing	+16.3	

Sewell
Party	Candidate	Votes	%	±%
Labour	Julie Brociek-Couton *	1,591	59.5	+22.8
Conservative	Robin Sear	466	17.4	+2.7
Green	Ian Chapman	300	11.2	−17.6
Liberal Democrats	Alice Thomson	197	7.4	+4.5
UKIP	Glenn Tingle	118	4.4	−12.4
Majority		1,125	42.1	+34.2
Turnout		2,672	34.5	+6.6
Labour hold		Swing	+10.0	

Thorpe Hamlet
Party	Candidate	Votes	%	±%
Labour	Chris Jones	1,175	35.0	+4.3
Green	Lesley Grahame	1,100	32.8	−5.4
Conservative	Stephen Barber	763	22.7	+0.2
Liberal Democrats	Sarah Tustin	224	6.7	−2.0
UKIP	Nick Lansdell	95	2.8	2.8
Majority		75	2.2	−5.2
Turnout		3,357	37.6	+9.2
Labour gain from Green		Swing	+4.8	

Town Close
Party	Candidate	Votes	%	±%
Labour	Emma Corlett *	2,026	51.9	+12.8
Conservative	Mary Chacksfield	908	23.3	+4.1
Green	Phil di Palma	542	13.9	−21.5
Liberal Democrats	James Anthony	347	8.9	+2.5
UKIP	Anthea Rule	82	2.1	+2.1
Majority		1,118	28.6	+24.9
Turnout		3,905	46.9	+9.5
Labour hold		Swing	+4.3	

University
Party	Candidate	Votes	%	±%
Labour	David Rowntree	1,173	58.8	−3.8
Conservative	Gary Walsh	330	16.5	+6.0
Green	Lewis Martin	257	12.9	−7.5
Liberal Democrats	Toby Bennett	126	6.3	−0.1
UKIP	Rob Lowe	109	5.5	+5.5
Majority		843	42.3	+0.1
Turnout		1,995	36.8	+12.7
Labour hold		Swing	−4.9	

Wensum
Party	Candidate	Votes	%	±%
Labour	Kim Clipsham	1,324	49.4	+10.4
Green	Richard Edwards	612	22.8	−23.1
Conservative	David King	455	17.0	+6.1
UKIP	Steven Bradley	176	6.6	+6.6
Liberal Democrats	Jack Spoor	115	4.3	+0.1
Majority		712	26.5	+19.5
Turnout		2,682	33.4	+6.1
Labour gain from Green		Swing	+16.8	

=== South Norfolk ===
District Summary

Party	Seats	+/-	Votes	%	+/-
Conservative	11	Steady	22,370	57.8	+14.6
Liberal Democrat	1	Steady	9,508	24.6	+10.8
Labour	0	Steady	6,544	16.9	+3.5
Green	0	Steady	303	0.8	−4.7

Division Results

Clavering
Party	Candidate	Votes	%	±%
Conservative	Margaret Stone *	1,756	52.2	+20.9
Liberal Democrats	Christopher Brown	1,131	33.6	+11.4
Labour	Nicola Fowler	475	14.1	+1.8
Majority		625	18.6	+11.9
Turnout		3,362	38.6	+4.8
Conservative hold		Swing	+4.8	

Costessey
Party	Candidate	Votes	%	±%
Liberal Democrats	Tim East *	1,603	44.9	+6.8
Conservative	Andrew Wiltshire	1,216	34.0	+14.5
Labour	Jonathan Garrard	553	15.5	+1.1
Green	Catherine Rowett	200	5.6	−1.4
Majority		387	10.8	−6.1
Turnout		3,572	31.9	+3.7
Liberal Democrats hold		Swing	−3.9	

Diss & Roydon
Party	Candidate	Votes	%	±%
Conservative	Keith Kiddie	1,484	53.9	+9.7
Liberal Democrats	Tracey Scoggins	792	28.8	+19.1
Labour	Christopher Davison	375	13.6	−1.5
Green	Anthony Milton	103	3.7	−5.5
Majority		692	25.1	+2.8
Turnout		2,754	33.6	+2.1
Conservative hold		Swing	−4.7	

East Depwade
Party	Candidate	Votes	%	±%
Conservative	Martin Wilby *	1,858	67.1	+3.9
Labour	James Eddy	461	16.6	−0.4
Liberal Democrats	Susan Kuzmic	451	16.3	−3.4
Majority		1,397	50.4	+6.9
Turnout		2,770	35.8	+5.1
Conservative hold		Swing	+2.2	

Forehoe
Party	Candidate	Votes	%	±%
Conservative	Colin Foulger *	1,785	58.2	+29.2
Liberal Democrats	Robert McClenning	709	23.1	+6.6
Labour	Steven Sewell	575	18.7	+7.4
Majority		1,076	35.1	+24.6
Turnout		3,069	36.5	+2.7
Conservative hold		Swing	+11.3	

Henstead
Party	Candidate	Votes	%	±%
Conservative	Victor Thomson	1,790	57.1	+14.8
Liberal Democrats	Matthew Hammond	734	23.4	+12.0
Labour	Thomas Fowler	611	19.5	+2.9
Majority		1,056	33.7	+13.5
Turnout		3,135	40.7	+5.2
Conservative hold		Swing	+1.4	

Hingham
Party	Candidate	Votes	%	±%
Conservative	Margaret Dewsbury *	1,708	67.4	+7.7
Labour	James Leman	416	16.4	+2.7
Liberal Democrats	Paul Blathwayt	411	16.2	+8.4
Majority		1,292	51.0	+10.1
Turnout		2,535	38.6	+6.4
Conservative hold		Swing	+2.5	

Humbleyard
Party	Candidate	Votes	%	±%
Conservative	David Bills	2,215	59.7	+14.3
Liberal Democrats	Jacqueline Sutton	883	23.8	+15.2
Labour	Bethan Gulliver	610	16.5	+2.9
Majority		1,332	35.9	+10.6
Turnout		3,708	39.0	+5.9
Conservative hold		Swing	−0.5	

Loddon
Party	Candidate	Votes	%	±%
Conservative	Barry Stone *	2,091	63.2	−0.5
Liberal Democrats	David Bingham	613	18.5	+13.3
Labour	David Bissonnet	605	18.3	+6.1
Majority		1,478	44.7	−0.1
Turnout		3,309	39.5	+1.9
Conservative hold		Swing	−6.9	

Long Stratton
Party	Candidate	Votes	%	±%
Conservative	Alison Thomas *	1,832	64.4	+21.6
Liberal Democrats	Roger Percival	555	19.5	+9.2
Labour	Elana Katz	456	16.0	+1.8
Majority		1,277	44.9	+27.4
Turnout		2,843	37.0	+3.5
Conservative hold		Swing	+6.2	

West Depwade
Party	Candidate	Votes	%	±%
Conservative	Beverley Spratt *	2,413	65.3	+19.1
Liberal Democrats	Ian Spratt	705	19.1	+3.8
Labour	Pamela Reekie	575	15.6	+2.1
Majority		1,708	46.3	+25.1
Turnout		3,693	41.5	+4.3
Conservative hold		Swing	+7.7	

Wymondham
Party	Candidate	Votes	%	±%
Conservative	Joe Mooney *	2,222	55.9	+17.8
Liberal Democrats	Julian Halls	921	23.2	+20.8
Labour	Douglas Underwood	832	20.9	+11.5
Majority		1,301	32.7	+27.6
Turnout		3,975	40.0	+1.1
Conservative hold		Swing	−1.5	
