= 2013 Norfolk County Council election =

2013 UK local government election

- 2 May 2013

All 84 council division seats 43 seats needed for a majority

	First party	Second party	Third party
Leader	Bill Borrett	Rex Parkinson-Hare	George Nobbs
Party	Conservative	UKIP	Labour
Leader since	February 2013	June 2009	June 2009
Leader's seat	Elmham & Mattishall	Yarmouth Nelson & Southtown	Crome
Last election	60 seats, 45.9%	1 seat, 4.6%	3 seats, 13.5%
Seats before	60	1	5
Seats won	40	15	14
Seat change	▼20	▲14	▲11
Popular vote	70,249	50,568	49,028
Percentage	32.6%	23.5%	22.8%
Swing	▼13.3%	▲18.9%	▲9.0%
	Fourth party	Fifth party
Leader	Mike Brindle	Richard Bearman
Party	Liberal Democrats	Green
Leader since	June 2012	10 January 2012
Leader's seat	Thetford West (Retired)	Mancroft
Last election	13 seats, 22.7%	7 seats, 10.9%
Seats before	9	6
Seats won	10	4
Seat change	▼3	▼3
Popular vote	23,645	14,119
Percentage	11.0%	6.6%
Swing	▼11.7%	▼4.3%
- Map showing the results of the 2013 Norfolk County Council elections.
Party before election
Conservative
Elected Party
No Overall Control

The 2013 Norfolk County Council election took place across Norfolk on 2 May 2013, coinciding with local elections for all county councils in England. The results were announced the following day, Friday 3 May 2013. The result brought to an end 12 years of Conservative administration, who finished three seats short of a majority after losing 20 seats, leaving the Council in no overall control (NOC). UKIP and the Labour Party both made gains of 14 and 11 seats respectively. The Liberal Democrats and the Green Party both lost three seats each, whilst an independent won a single seat in North Norfolk.

== Previous composition ==
=== 2009 election ===
Party	Seats
Conservative	60
Liberal Democrats	13
Green	7
Labour	3
UKIP	1
Total	84

=== Composition of council seats before election ===
Party	Seats
Conservative	60
Liberal Democrats	9
Green	6
Labour	5
Independent	2
UKIP	1
Vacant	1
Total	84

=== Changes between elections ===
In between the 2009 election and the 2013 election, the following council seats changed hands:

Division	Date	Previous Party	New Party	Cause	Resulting Council Composition					
Division	Date	Previous Party	New Party	Cause	Con	LDem	Grn	Lab	UKIP	Ind
North Coast	26 November 2012	Independent	Vacant	Sitting councillor resigned. (Note: No by-election was held as the resignation was sufficiently close to the upcoming County election.)	60	9	6	5	1	2
Forehoe	16 October 2012	Conservative	Independent	Councillor quit party to sit as an independent member.	60	9	6	5	1	3
Mundesley	16 October 2012	Liberal Democrats	Independent	Councillor quit party to sit as an independent member.	61	9	6	5	1	2
Clenchwarton and King's Lynn South	27 September 2012	Conservative	Labour	Conservative incumbent resigned. Labour won by-election.	61	10	6	5	1	1
North Coast	21 September 2012	Conservative	Independent	Councillor left party to run for Police & Crime Commissioner.	62	10	6	5	1	1
Thorpe Hamlet	19 December 2011	Green	Conservative	Sitting Green Councillor defected to Conservatives.	63	10	6	4	1	0
Lakenham	25 November 2011	Liberal Democrats	Labour	Liberal Democrats incumbent resigned. Labour won by-election.	62	10	7	4	1	0
Fakenham	8 November 2011	Liberal Democrats	Conservative	Sitting Liberal Democrats Councillor defected to Conservatives.	62	11	7	3	1	0
South Smallburgh	25 July 2011	Liberal Democrats	Conservative	Sitting Liberal Democrats Councillor defected to Conservatives.	61	12	7	3	1	0

== Summary of results ==
Norfolk County Council election results 2013
Party	Seats	Gains	Losses	Net gain/loss	Seats %	Votes %	Votes	+/−
Conservative	40	2	22	−20	47.6	32.6	70,249	−13.3
UKIP	15	14	0	14	17.9	23.5	50,568	+18.9
Labour	14	11	0	11	16.7	22.8	49,028	+9.0
Liberal Democrats	10	1	4	−3	11.9	11.0	23,645	−11.7
Green	4	0	3	−3	4.8	6.6	14,119	−4.3
Independent	1	1	0	+1	1.2	3.5	7,519	+2.1
CPA	0	0	0	±0	0	0.1	287	+0.1
United People's Party	0	0	0	±0	0	0.0	50	N/A
Total	84						215,465	

=== Gains and Losses ===
The Conservative Party suffered net a net loss of 20 seats (22 losses and 2 gains); Liberal Democrats a net loss of 3 seats (4 losses and 1 gain); the Green Party lost 3 seats, finishing with four in total. UKIP made 14 gains to become the official opposition, while Labour gained 11 seats, and 1 seat was gained by an independent.

The Conservatives lost one seat (Hevingham & Spixworth) to the Liberal Democrats in Broadland, one to an Independent candidate (North Coast) in King's Lynn and West Norfolk, 7 seats to Labour (Caister-on-Sea, Yarmouth North & Central, Clenchwarton & King's Lynn South, Gaywood South, King's Lynn North & Central, Bowthorpe and Catton Grove), as well as losing 13 seats to UKIP (Dereham South, Swaffham, Thetford East, Watton, Breydon, East Flegg, Gorleston St Andrews, Lothingland, Gayton & Nar Valley, Gaywood North & Central, Marshland North, Holt and Melton Constable).

The Liberal Democrats lost two seats to the Conservatives (Fakenham and Mundesley, both in North Norfolk), one seat to UKIP in Breckland (Thetford West) and one to Labour covering several city wards in the Norwich district (Lakenham).

The Green Party lost three seats to Labour in Norwich (Mile Cross, Sewell and Town Close).

=== Incumbent councillors ===
A total of 55 incumbent councillors were defending their seats for the same party they had stood for in 2009 (or in one of the five subsequent by-election). 41 were successful in retaining their seats, while 14 were not.

41 incumbent Conservative County Councillors were defending their seats at this election, including Judy Leggett (Old Catton), Judith Virgo (Humbleyard) and Barry Stone (Lothingland) who had won their seats in by-elections. Of these 41, 28 were re-elected while the other 13 lost their seats (9 to UKIP, 3 to Labour, 1 to the Liberal Democrats). All 5 Liberal Democrat incumbents held their seats. The Green Party had 3 incumbents defending seats; two were retained, while one was lost to Labour. Labour incumbents successfully defended all 5 of their seats (two of which they had won in by-elections – Susan Whitaker in Lakenham division and Alexandra Kemp (née Kampourpoulos) in Clenchwarton and King's Lynn South division). UKIP's single councillor retained his seat.

Incumbents who stood for other parties or as independents (such as former Conservative Jon Herbert in Forehoe) are not counted in these figures.

=== Group leaders ===
Bill Borrett (Elmham & Mattishall) was re-elected unopposed as the Conservative group leader, George Nobbs (Crome) was re-elected unopposed as the leader of the Labour Group. The Liberal Democrats elected Dr Marie Strong (Wells) as their new group leader, replacing Mike Brindle who did not stand in this election. Richard Bearman (Mancroft) continued as the leader of the Green Party group. Richard Toby Coke (Gayton & Nar Valley) was selected as the UKIP group leader.

=== Turnout ===
The overall turnout at the election was 32.14% (215,465 votes, out of a total electorate of 670,383). The turnout in each division ranged form 18.09% in King's Lynn North & Central to 50.75% in Holt.

=== Council Leader Election ===
With the council now being in no overall control it was unclear who would be elected Leader. In the event, at the initial election for Council Leader on 13 May 2013, the Conservatives lost by 40 votes to 43.

After the initial vote, a "rainbow" alliance was formed between Labour, UKIP, The Liberal Democrats with support from the Green Party. Under the agreement, the existing cabinet system would be abolished and replaced by a new committee system with Labour councillor George Nobbs to be nominated to be Leader. On 27 May he was elected by a vote of 42 to 38.

Election for Norfolk County Council Leader: 27 May 2013 Simple majority required
Candidate: George Nobbs (Labour)
Choice	Vote	
Choice	Parties	Votes
Yes	UKIP (15), Labour (13), Liberal Democrats (9), Green (4), Independent (1)	42 / 84
No	Conservative (38)	38 / 84
Abstaining		0 / 84
Absent: Conservative (2), Labour (1), Liberal Democrats (1)
Source: Norfolk County Council

=== Aftermath ===
Tom FitzPatrick (Fakenham) replaced Bill Borrett as Conservative group leader on 1 May 2014, however less than 10 months later he was successfully challenged by Cliff Jordan (Yare & All Saints) in the following March.

The 'Rainbow Alliance' of UKIP, Labour, and the Liberal Democrats with support from the Greens ran the council until May 2016, with George Nobbs being re-elected by 43 votes to 40 in 2014, and by 42 to 39 in 2015. However, on 9 May 2016 the Alliance collapsed when the Green Party withdrew its support and abstained in the election for Leader, and Conservative Cliff Jordan won by 41 votes to 37. This enabled the Conservatives to run the Council through a minority administration until the local elections in May 2017.

== Candidates by party ==
84 / 84 70 / 84 43 / 84	84 / 84 62 / 84 21 / 84

There were a total of 364 candidates standing across the whole of the county – an average of 4 1/3 in each division. Both the Conservatives and Labour fielded a full slate of 84 candidates, UKIP stood 70 candidates, the Liberal Democrats stood 62, the Green Party stood 43, and there were 21 other candidates (including 3 for the Christian Peoples Alliance, 1 for the United People's Party and 17 independents).

Compared to 2009, UKIP had 52 more candidates, there were 6 more independent candidates than 2009, the Conservatives and Labour had the same number, the Liberal Democrats had 7 fewer candidates and the Green Party had 8 fewer candidates. The British National Party did not stand any candidates, compared to the 7 they stood in the previous election. In total, there were 44 more candidates than in 2009.

== Candidates and results by division ==
Below are the results of the election, separated into the 7 districts and 84 divisions.

=== Breckland ===
District Summary

Party	Seats	+/-	Votes	%	+/-
Conservative	7	▼4	11,103	36.9	
UKIP	5	▲5	10,486	34.8	
Labour	0	Steady	5,627	18.7	
Green	0	Steady	1,035	3.4	
Liberal Democrat	0	▼1	833	2.8	
Christian Peoples Alliance	0	Steady	287	1.0	

Division Results

Attleborough
Party	Candidate	Votes	%	±%
Conservative	Alec Byrne *	907	38.9	−19.2
UKIP	John Savory	758	32.6	+32.6
Labour	John Williams	530	22.8	+10.2
Liberal Democrats	Pat McClenning	134	5.8	+5.8
Majority		149	6.4	−22.5
Turnout		2,329	26.2	−7.6
Conservative hold		Swing	−19.2	

Dereham North
Party	Candidate	Votes	%	±%
Conservative	William Richmond	909	37.9	−16.0
UKIP	Anna Hamilton	793	33.1	+33.1
Labour Co-op	Harry Clarke	472	19.7	+2.9
Green	Ann Bowyer	224	9.3	−20.0
Majority		116	4.8	−19.7
Turnout		2,398	30.8	−4.3
Conservative hold		Swing	−24.5	

Dereham South
Party	Candidate	Votes	%	±%
UKIP	Paul Gilmour	876	35.8	+35.8
Conservative	Gordon Bambridge	693	28.3	−17.0
Labour	Craig Warmer	528	21.6	−4.9
Liberal Democrats	Paul Speed	180	7.4	−4.8
Green	David Bowyer	112	4.6	−11.5
CPA	Chris Olley	58	2.4	+2.4
Majority		183	7.5	−11.4
Turnout		2,447	27.8	−4.1
UKIP gain from Conservative		Swing	+26.4	

Elmham & Mattishall
Party	Candidate	Votes	%	±%
Conservative	Bill Borrett *	1,380	48.8	+3.8
UKIP	Anthony Moore	903	31.9	+31.9
Labour	Linda Goreham	545	19.3	+19.3
Majority		477	16.9	+3.4
Turnout		2,828	31.5	−12.4
Conservative hold		Swing	−14.1	

Guiltcross
Party	Candidate	Votes	%	±%
Conservative	Stephen Askew	1,132	43.6	−8.3
UKIP	Jeremy Power	692	26.7	+26.7
Labour	Jim Walters	438	16.9	+10.1
Liberal Democrats	Steve Gordon	334	12.9	−4.7
Majority		440	16.9	−17.4
Turnout		2,596	31.3	−11.6
Conservative hold		Swing	−17.5	

Necton & Launditch
Party	Candidate	Votes	%	±%
Conservative	Mark Kiddle-Morris *	1,289	40.6	−21.0
UKIP	James Leigh-Wood	867	27.3	+27.3
Labour	Joe Sisto	582	18.4	+3.9
Green	Jane Keidan-Cooper	254	8.0	+8.0
Independent	Glynn Burrows	180	5.7	+5.7
Majority		422	13.3	−24.5
Turnout		3,172	36.5	−7.9
Conservative hold		Swing	−24.2	

Swaffham
Party	Candidate	Votes	%	±%
UKIP	Paul Smyth	1,055	44.5	+44.5
Conservative	Ann Steward *	949	40.0	−13.0
Labour	Matthew Fulton	367	15.5	+3.4
Majority		106	4.5	−29.9
Turnout		2,371	30.1	−7.3
UKIP gain from Conservative		Swing	+28.8	

The Brecks
Party	Candidate	Votes	%	±%
Conservative	Ian Monson *	1,253	42.8	−36.8
UKIP	James Vernon	1,082	37.0	+37.0
Labour	Stephen Green	301	10.3	−10.1
Green	Jeff Prosser	194	6.6	+6.6
CPA	Mark Clamp	95	3.3	+3.3
Majority		171	5.8	−53.5
Turnout		2,925	33.5	−5.1
Conservative hold		Swing	−36.9	

Thetford East
Party	Candidate	Votes	%	±%
UKIP	Denis Crawford	896	47.0	+47.0
Conservative	Marion Chapman-Allen *	502	26.3	−23.3
Labour	Brenda Canham	360	18.9	+0.4
Green	Julia Yelloly	85	4.5	+4.5
Liberal Democrats	Bodo Rissmann	63	3.3	−28.5
Majority		394	20.7	+2.9
Turnout		1,906	24.4	−5.5
UKIP gain from Conservative		Swing	+35.1	

Thetford West
Party	Candidate	Votes	%	±%
UKIP	Peter Georgiou	814	35.4	+35.4
Labour Co-op	Terry Jermy	813	35.4	+7.4
Conservative	Tristan Ashby	353	15.4	−19.6
CPA	Carl Clark	134	5.8	+5.8
Liberal Democrats	Danny Jeffrey	122	5.3	−31.7
Green	Sandra Walmsley	64	2.8	+2.8
Majority		1	0.0	−2.0
Turnout		2,300	23.8	−3.7
UKIP gain from Liberal Democrats		Swing	+33.6	

Watton
Party	Candidate	Votes	%	±%
UKIP	Stan Hebborn	808	33.5	+33.5
Conservative	John Rogers *	662	27.5	−49.2
Independent	Keith Gilbert	569	23.6	+23.6
Labour	Margaret Holmes	270	11.2	−12.2
Green	Timothy Birt	102	4.2	+4.2
Majority		146	6.1	−47.2
Turnout		2,411	28.0	−3.2
UKIP gain from Conservative		Swing	+41.3	

Yare & All Saints
Party	Candidate	Votes	%	±%
Conservative	Cliff Jordan *	1,074	44.1	−35.1
UKIP	Paul Thompson	942	38.7	+38.7
Labour	John Michie	421	17.3	−3.6
Majority		132	5.4	−52.9
Turnout		2,437	32.2	−6.1
Conservative hold		Swing	−36.9	

=== Broadland ===
District Summary

Party	Seats	+/-	Votes	%	+/-
Conservative	10	▼1	12,409	37.8	
Liberal Democrat	3	▲1	5,169	15.7	
UKIP	0	Steady	8,003	24.4	
Labour	0	Steady	6,065	18.5	
Green	0	Steady	648	2.0	
Independent	0	Steady	550	1.7	

Division Results

Acle
Party	Candidate	Votes	%	±%
Conservative	Brian Iles *	867	40.1	−18.6
UKIP	Christopher Woollands	712	32.9	+32.9
Labour	Alan Pawsey	473	21.9	+5.3
Liberal Democrats	Victor Morgan	110	5.1	−19.6
Majority		155	7.2	−26.7
Turnout		2,162	32.1	−6.4
Conservative hold		Swing	−25.8	

Aylsham
Party	Candidate	Votes	%	±%
Liberal Democrats	David Harrison *	1,148	40.6	−13.2
Conservative	Ian Graham	727	25.7	−13.7
UKIP	Steve Emmens	617	21.8	+21.8
Labour	Ray Britt	333	11.8	+5.0
Majority		421	14.9	+0.5
Turnout		2,825	38.3	−4.7
Liberal Democrats hold		Swing	+0.3	

Blofield & Brundall
Party	Candidate	Votes	%	±%
Conservative	Andrew Proctor *	1,198	46.3	−17.4
Labour Co-op	Elliot Page	544	21.0	+9.7
UKIP	Armin Hess	493	19.0	+19.0
Green	Nick Ball	235	9.1	+9.1
Liberal Democrats	Peter Sergeant	119	4.6	−20.5
Majority		654	25.3	−13.3
Turnout		2,589	35.2	−7.7
Conservative hold		Swing	−13.6	

Drayton & Horsford
Party	Candidate	Votes	%	±%
Conservative	Tony Adams *	846	39.8	−9.7
UKIP	Brian Antuar	651	30.6	+30.6
Labour	Chris Jones	421	19.8	+11.7
Liberal Democrats	Veronica Beadle	210	9.9	−17.1
Majority		195	9.2	−13.3
Turnout		2,128	26.9	−7.8
Conservative hold		Swing	−20.1	

Hellesdon
Party	Candidate	Votes	%	±%
Conservative	Shelagh Gurney *	1,120	39.6	−5.7
UKIP	Michael Walsh	831	29.4	+10.3
Labour	Sasha Pearce	496	17.5	+5.8
Liberal Democrats	Peter Balcombe	229	8.1	−8.6
Green	Jennifer Parkhouse	154	5.4	−1.8
Majority		289	10.2	−16.0
Turnout		2,830	31.8	−3.6
Conservative hold		Swing	−8.0	

Hevingham & Spixworth
Party	Candidate	Votes	%	±%
Liberal Democrats	Daniel Roper	850	36.6	−2.1
Conservative	Shaun Vincent	680	29.3	−13.8
UKIP	Sandra Smyth	563	24.2	+24.2
Labour	Tony Hemmingway	231	9.9	+3.5
Majority		170	7.3	+2.9
Turnout		2,324	32.8	−7.1
Liberal Democrats gain from Conservative		Swing	+5.9	

Old Catton
Party	Candidate	Votes	%	±%
Conservative	Judy Leggett *	796	36.8	−12.0
UKIP	Lionel Buckingham	497	23.0	+6.7
Labour	Peter Watson	389	18.0	+7.2
Liberal Democrats	James Wright	362	16.7	+3.2
Green	Phil di Palma	119	5.5	−5.1
Majority		299	13.8	−18.7
Turnout		2,163	33.1	−5.2
Conservative hold		Swing	−9.4	

Reepham
Party	Candidate	Votes	%	±%
Liberal Democrats	James Joyce *	768	33.6	−18.9
Conservative	Kerrie Barnett	717	31.4	−9.8
UKIP	Dominic Low	510	22.3	+22.3
Labour	Christine Hemmingway	292	12.8	+6.4
Majority		51	2.2	−9.0
Turnout		2,287	34.9	−8.7
Liberal Democrats hold		Swing	−4.5	

Sprowston
Party	Candidate	Votes	%	±%
Conservative	John Ward *	1,076	33.8	+1.4
Labour Co-op	Chrissie Rumsby	941	29.6	+12.5
UKIP	John Gilson	865	27.2	+8.1
Liberal Democrats	Sam Sirdar	302	9.5	−6.8
Majority		135	4.2	−9.0
Turnout		3,184	34.0	−3.7
Conservative hold		Swing	−5.5	

Taverham
Party	Candidate	Votes	%	±%
Conservative	Stuart Clancy *	1,399	55.5	−1.8
UKIP	Ian Kelly	613	24.3	+24.3
Labour	Angus Dixon	285	11.3	+1.7
Liberal Democrats	Paul Burall	223	8.9	−11.9
Majority		786	31.2	−5.4
Turnout		2,520	32.5	−3.5
Conservative hold		Swing	−13.1	

Thorpe St Andrew
Party	Candidate	Votes	%	±%
Conservative	Ian Mackie *	1,153	46.7	−11.1
Labour	Joanna Barker	577	23.4	+12.6
UKIP	David Moreland	553	22.4	+22.4
Liberal Democrats	Steve Buckle	186	7.5	−10.3
Majority		576	23.3	−16.6
Turnout		2,469	31.4	−6.4
Conservative hold		Swing	−11.8	

Woodside
Party	Candidate	Votes	%	±%
Conservative	Nigel Shaw *	922	38.8	−9.8
Labour	Jill Wigy	768	32.4	+14.3
UKIP	Ean Newberry	555	23.4	+23.4
Liberal Democrats	Phyllida Scrivens	129	5.4	−13.0
Majority		154	6.5	−23.7
Turnout		2,374	36.2	−2.5
Conservative hold		Swing	−12.0	

Wroxham
Party	Candidate	Votes	%	±%
Conservative	Tom Garrod	908	31.9	−24.6
Independent	Stephen Heard	550	19.3	+19.3
UKIP	Richard Amies	543	19.1	+19.1
Liberal Democrats	Michael Kitching	533	18.7	+3.4
Labour	Malcolm Kemp	315	11.1	+1.9
Majority		358	12.6	−24.9
Turnout		2,849	35.7	−5.0
Conservative hold		Swing	−22.0	

=== Great Yarmouth ===
District Summary

Party	Seats	+/-	Votes	%	+/-
UKIP	5	▲4	7,609	36.4	
Labour	3	▲2	7,139	34.1	
Conservative	1	▼6	5,878	28.1	
Liberal Democrat	0	Steady	141	0.7	
Green	0	Steady	115	0.6	
United People's	0	Steady	50	0.2	+0.2

Division Results

Breydon
Party	Candidate	Votes	%	±%
UKIP	Alan Grey	903	37.0	+12.3
Labour	Trevor Wainwright	822	33.7	+1.0
Conservative	Graham Plant *	715	29.3	−5.9
Majority		81	3.3	+0.8
Turnout		2,440	29.3	−2.8
UKIP gain from Conservative		Swing	+9.1	

Caister-on-Sea
Party	Candidate	Votes	%	±%
Labour	Patrick Hacon	875	34.7	+6.0
UKIP	Jack Cutting	802	31.8	+31.8
Conservative	Ronald Hanton *	688	27.3	−26.8
Green	Harry Webb	115	4.6	+4.6
Liberal Democrats	Nicholas Dyer	44	1.7	−15.5
Majority		73	2.9	−22.4
Turnout		2,524	35.0	−3.4
Labour gain from Conservative		Swing	+16.4	

East Flegg
Party	Candidate	Votes	%	±%
UKIP	Jonathon Childs	997	41.7	+41.7
Conservative	Jim Shrimplin *	906	37.9	−22.0
Labour	Brian Pilkington	486	20.3	+9.0
Majority		91	3.8	−41.5
Turnout		2,389	32.8	−7.8
UKIP gain from Conservative		Swing	+31.9	

Gorleston St Andrews
Party	Candidate	Votes	%	±%
UKIP	Matthew Smith	874	36.7	+7.9
Labour	Tony Wright	854	35.9	+13.2
Conservative	Patricia Page	653	27.4	−21.1
Majority		20	0.8	−18.8
Turnout		2,381	33.2	−0.4
UKIP gain from Conservative		Swing	+14.5	

Lothingland
Party	Candidate	Votes	%	±%
UKIP	Colin Aldred	930	37.6	+5.2
Conservative	Barry Stone *	856	34.6	−10.8
Labour	Brian Walker	685	27.7	+5.6
Majority		74	3.0	−10.0
Turnout		2,471	29.5	−4.7
UKIP gain from Conservative		Swing	+8.0	

Magdalen
Party	Candidate	Votes	%	±%
Labour	Colleen Walker *	1,086	48.0	+11.9
UKIP	Matthew Swann	757	33.5	+3.5
Conservative	Brian Dolton	419	18.5	−15.4
Majority		329	14.5	+12.3
Turnout		2,262	28.9	−2.0
Labour hold		Swing	+4.2	

West Flegg
Party	Candidate	Votes	%	±%
Conservative	Michael Carttiss *	802	40.7	−18.2
UKIP	Daniel Thistlewaite	629	31.9	+31.9
Labour	Lee Sutton	542	27.5	+15.1
Majority		173	8.8	−21.3
Turnout		1,973	34.1	−4.3
Conservative hold		Swing	−25.0	

Yarmouth Nelson & Southtown
Party	Candidate	Votes	%	±%
UKIP	Rex Parkinson-Hare *	825	42.1	+3.8
Labour	Kerry Robinson-Payne	814	41.5	+7.0
Conservative	Barry Coleman	271	13.8	−13.3
United People's	Shaun Wright	50	2.6	+2.6
Majority		11	0.6	−3.2
Turnout		1,960	21.8	−0.2
UKIP hold		Swing	−1.6	

Yarmouth North & Central
Party	Candidate	Votes	%	±%
Labour Co-op	Michael Castle	975	38.5	+9.3
UKIP	Kay Grey	892	35.2	+16.5
Conservative	Penny Carpenter	568	22.4	−11.7
Liberal Democrats	Anthony Harris	97	3.8	−5.7
Majority		83	3.3	−1.7
Turnout		2,532	27.9	−4.3
Labour gain from Conservative		Swing	+10.5	

=== King's Lynn and West Norfolk ===
District Summary

Party	Seats	+/-	Votes	%	+/-
Conservative	7	▼7	12,034	35.6	
UKIP	3	▲3	8,249	24.4	
Labour	3	▲3	8,054	23.9	
Independent	1	▲1	3,579	10.6	
Liberal Democrat	0	Steady	1,080	3.2	
Green	0	Steady	773	2.3	

Division Results

Clenchwarton & King's Lynn South
Party	Candidate	Votes	%	±%
Labour	Alexandra Kemp *	955	44.1	+32.4
UKIP	Jason Edwards	631	29.1	+29.1
Conservative	David Whitby	582	26.9	−12.4
Majority		324	14.9	+4.4
Turnout		2,168	29.1	−5.8
Labour gain from Conservative		Swing	+22.4	

Dersingham
Party	Candidate	Votes	%	±%
Conservative	John Dobson *	1,422	46.6	+3.4
UKIP	Irene Ramsbotham	844	27.7	+27.7
Labour	Richard Pennington	627	20.6	+9.1
Liberal Democrats	Erika Coward	158	5.2	−10.9
Majority		578	18.9	−3.3
Turnout		3,051	35.1	−9.0
Conservative hold		Swing	−12.1	

Docking
Party	Candidate	Votes	%	±%
Conservative	Michael Chenery of Horsbrugh *	1,138	42.6	−13.0
Independent	David Holmes	1,012	37.9	+37.9
Labour	Ian Gourlay	523	19.6	+6.3
Majority		126	4.7	−34.6
Turnout		2,673	33.4	−6.7
Conservative hold		Swing	−25.4	

Downham Market
Party	Candidate	Votes	%	±%
Conservative	Tony White *	878	36.3	−24.3
UKIP	Karen Head	774	32.0	+32.0
Labour Co-op	Peter Smith	523	21.6	+5.9
Independent	Sheridan Payne	245	10.1	+10.1
Majority		104	4.3	−40.5
Turnout		2,420	30.8	−5.9
Conservative hold		Swing	−28.1	

Feltwell
Party	Candidate	Votes	%	±%
Conservative	Martin Storey	1,273	44.6	−10.1
UKIP	John Bankhead	1,095	38.4	+38.4
Labour	Phil Davies	485	17.0	+9.9
Majority		178	6.2	−26.7
Turnout		2,853	30.2	−6.5
Conservative hold		Swing	−24.3	

Fincham
Party	Candidate	Votes	%	±%
Conservative	Brian Long	990	38.6	−28.1
UKIP	Ashley Collins	872	34.0	+34.0
Labour	Jonathan Toye	556	21.7	+10.5
Liberal Democrats	Kate Sayer	146	5.7	−16.4
Majority		118	4.6	−40.0
Turnout		2,564	30.0	−8.5
Conservative hold		Swing	−31.1	

Freebridge Lynn
Party	Candidate	Votes	%	±%
Conservative	Jason Law	917	33.4	−21.1
Green	Michael De Whalley	773	28.2	+15.8
UKIP	Neville Manley	589	21.5	+21.5
Labour	Gary Howman	389	14.2	+3.0
Liberal Democrats	Tony Bubb	76	2.8	−11.1
Majority		144	5.2	−35.4
Turnout		2,744	36.3	−5.6
Conservative hold		Swing	−18.4	

Gayton & Nar Valley
Party	Candidate	Votes	%	±%
UKIP	Richard Coke	783	28.3	+28.3
Independent	Mike Knights	723	26.2	+26.2
Conservative	Paul Foster	548	19.8	−40.9
Liberal Democrats	Elaine Oliver	369	13.4	+13.4
Labour	Peter Wilkinson	201	7.3	−7.8
Independent	Baljinder Anota	141	5.1	+5.1
Majority		60	2.2	−34.4
Turnout		2,765	33.7	−4.7
UKIP gain from Conservative		Swing	+34.6	

Gaywood North & Central
Party	Candidate	Votes	%	±%
UKIP	Jim Perkins	697	35.6	+26.8
Labour	John Collop	625	31.9	+14.6
Conservative	Jean Mickleburgh *	478	24.4	−18.0
Liberal Democrats	John Loveless	158	8.1	−6.3
Majority		72	3.7	−21.4
Turnout		1,958	26.4	−8.1
UKIP gain from Conservative		Swing	+26.8	

Gaywood South
Party	Candidate	Votes	%	±%
Labour	Margaret Wilkinson	835	37.4	+17.0
UKIP	Michael Stone	758	34.0	+20.0
Conservative	Michael Langwade *	466	20.9	−11.2
Liberal Democrats	Richard Coward	173	7.8	−8.4
Majority		77	3.5	−8.2
Turnout		2,232	22.8	−5.7
Labour gain from Conservative		Swing	+14.1	

King's Lynn North & Central
Party	Candidate	Votes	%	±%
Labour	David Collis	1,026	72.6	+42.9
Conservative	Thomas Smith	387	27.4	−5.3
Majority		639	45.2	+42.3
Turnout		1,413	18.1	−8.5
Labour gain from Conservative		Swing	+24.1	

Marshland North
Party	Candidate	Votes	%	±%
UKIP	Fred Agnew	751	37.1	+37.1
Conservative	Tony Wright *	621	30.7	−49.0
Independent	Sally Rust	333	16.5	+16.5
Labour	Holly Rust	317	15.7	−4.6
Majority		130	6.4	−53.0
Turnout		2,022	26.5	−4.9
UKIP gain from Conservative		Swing	+43.1	

Marshland South
Party	Candidate	Votes	%	±%
Conservative	Harry Humphrey *	1,375	65.5	+14.5
Labour	Heather Fouracre	723	34.5	+27.3
Majority		652	31.1	−1.2
Turnout		2,098	21.5	−12.0
Conservative hold		Swing	−6.4	

North Coast
Party	Candidate	Votes	%	±%
Independent	Richard Bird	1,125	40.1	+40.1
Conservative	Gary Sandell	959	34.2	−28.7
UKIP	John Crane	455	16.2	+16.2
Labour	Emilia Rust	269	9.6	−1.9
Majority		166	5.9	−44.0
Turnout		2,808	37.7	−4.0
Independent gain from Conservative		Swing	+34.4	

=== North Norfolk ===
District Summary

Party	Seats	+/-	Votes	%	+/-
Liberal Democrat	5	▼2	8,388	25.8	
Conservative	4	Steady	8,774	27.0	
UKIP	2	▲2	8,388	25.6	
Labour	0	Steady	5,234	16.1	
Green	0	Steady	1,237	3.8	
Independent	0	Steady	532	1.8	

Division Results

Cromer
Party	Candidate	Votes	%	±%
Conservative	Hilary Cox	1,127	34.7	−7.3
UKIP	Stephen Scott-Fawcett	804	24.7	+5.6
Liberal Democrats	Richard Harbord	585	18.0	−14.3
Labour	Scott Eastwood	551	17.0	+10.4
Green	Rupert Eris	127	3.9	+3.9
Independent	John Morgan	56	1.7	+1.7
Majority		323	9.9	+0.3
Turnout		3,250	39.5	−3.7
Conservative hold		Swing	−6.5	

Fakenham
Party	Candidate	Votes	%	±%
Conservative	Tom Fitzpatrick	764	31.8	−6.8
Labour	Janet Holdom	646	26.9	+17.0
UKIP	Terence Comber	639	26.6	+26.6
Liberal Democrats	Gloria Lisher	249	10.4	−41.2
Green	Frances Collinson	106	4.4	+4.4
Majority		118	4.9	−8.1
Turnout		2,404	29.7	−5.8
Conservative gain from Liberal Democrats		Swing	+17.2	

Holt
Party	Candidate	Votes	%	±%
UKIP	Michael Baker	1,341	35.4	+8.7
Conservative	Helen Eales	991	26.2	−12.6
Liberal Democrats	Sarah Butikofer	851	22.5	+3.9
Labour	Jono Read	399	10.5	+7.9
Green	Martin Langsdon	204	5.4	−0.1
Majority		350	9.2	−2.8
Turnout		3,786	50.8	−3.6
UKIP gain from Conservative		Swing	+10.7	

Hoveton & Stalham
Party	Candidate	Votes	%	±%
Conservative	Nigel Dixon *	833	31.7	−18.2
UKIP	Duncan Baker	641	24.4	+24.4
Labour	Sheila Cullingham	554	21.1	+13.2
Liberal Democrats	Steve Riley	521	19.8	−22.5
Green	Alicia Hull	83	3.2	+3.2
Majority		192	7.3	−0.3
Turnout		2,632	36.7	−4.8
Conservative hold		Swing	−21.3	

Melton Constable
Party	Candidate	Votes	%	±%
UKIP	David Ramsbotham	1,144	35.7	+20.3
Conservative	Russell Wright *	945	29.5	−11.4
Labour	Callum Ringer	568	17.7	+12.5
Liberal Democrats	Jacqueline Howe	355	11.1	−18.3
Green	Thomas Robinson	193	6.0	+3.1
Majority		199	6.2	−5.3
Turnout		3,205	42.7	−4.2
UKIP gain from Conservative		Swing	+15.9	

Mundesley
Party	Candidate	Votes	%	±%
Conservative	Wyndham Northam	742	26.3	−14.1
UKIP	Jason Patchett	624	22.1	+22.1
Liberal Democrats	Edward Maxfield	582	20.6	−34.1
Independent	Graham Jones *	283	10.0	+10.0
Labour	Liz Cornwall	255	9.0	+4.0
Independent	Philip Keddell	249	8.8	+8.8
Green	Peter Crouch	92	3.3	+3.3
Majority		118	4.2	−10.1
Turnout		2,827	38.9	−9.8
Conservative gain from Liberal Democrats		Swing	+10.0	

North Walsham East
Party	Candidate	Votes	%	±%
Liberal Democrats	Edward Foss	1,068	35.1	−17.3
UKIP	Lynette Comber	705	23.2	+10.4
Labour	Stephen Burke	645	21.2	+16.0
Conservative	Richard Shepherd	500	16.4	−7.7
Green	Paul Oakes	124	4.1	−1.4
Majority		363	11.9	−16.3
Turnout		3,042	34.9	−6.6
Liberal Democrats hold		Swing	−13.9	

North Walsham West & Erpingham
Party	Candidate	Votes	%	±%
Liberal Democrats	John Timewell	804	28.3	−25.7
Labour Co-op	Dave Spencer	765	26.9	+19.9
Conservative	Norman Smith	591	20.8	−18.3
UKIP	John Arthurson	546	19.2	+19.2
Green	Roger Fredenburgh	140	4.9	+4.9
Majority		39	1.4	−13.5
Turnout		2,846	39.3	−4.8
Liberal Democrats hold		Swing	−22.8	

Sheringham
Party	Candidate	Votes	%	±%
Liberal Democrats	Brian Hannah *	1,084	36.8	−22.4
Conservative	Rhodri Oliver	850	28.8	−7.9
UKIP	David Wilson	557	18.9	+18.9
Labour	Noel Gant	361	12.2	+8.1
Green	Alistair Cormack	97	3.3	+3.3
Majority		234	7.9	−14.5
Turnout		2,949	43.0	−2.3
Liberal Democrats hold		Swing	−7.2	

South Smallburgh
Party	Candidate	Votes	%	±%
Liberal Democrats	David Thomas	879	30.6	−8.1
Conservative	Paul Rice *	844	29.4	−5.1
UKIP	Jeffrey Parkes	768	26.7	+5.9
Labour	Denise Burke	274	9.5	+3.6
Green	Ingrid Dodd	107	3.7	+3.7
Majority		35	1.2	−3.0
Turnout		2,872	40.1	−6.2
Liberal Democrats hold		Swing	−1.5	

Wells
Party	Candidate	Votes	%	±%
Liberal Democrats	Marie Strong *	1,410	49.0	−1.3
Conservative	Simon Hester	587	20.4	−20.7
UKIP	Harry Askew	561	19.5	+19.5
Labour Co-op	Martyn Sloman	216	7.5	−1.1
Green	Sharon Harvey	104	3.6	+3.6
Majority		823	28.6	+19.4
Turnout		2,878	41.9	−5.3
Liberal Democrats hold		Swing	+9.7	

=== Norwich ===
District Summary

Party	Seats	+/-	Votes	%	+/-
Labour	8	▲6	12,365	39.4	
Green	4	▼3	8,471	27.0	
Liberal Democrat	1	▼1	3,370	10.7	
Conservative	0	▼2	5,424	17.3	
UKIP	0	Steady	1,755	5.6	

Division Results

Bowthorpe
Party	Candidate	Votes	%	±%
Labour	Mike Sands	1,144	50.6	+24.9
Conservative	Paul Wells *	676	29.9	−5.7
Green	Jean Bishop	342	15.1	+0.6
Liberal Democrats	Felicity Hartley	97	4.3	−19.8
Majority		468	20.7	+10.9
Turnout		2,259	27.1	−4.5
Labour gain from Conservative		Swing	+15.3	

Catton Grove
Party	Candidate	Votes	%	±%
Labour	Steve Morphew	945	43.9	+19.2
UKIP	Michelle Ho	484	22.5	+4.2
Conservative	Christopher Gray	416	19.3	−10.2
Green	Tony Park	208	9.7	−7.3
Liberal Democrats	Leigh Tooke	99	4.6	−5.9
Majority		461	21.4	+16.6
Turnout		2,152	27.1	−4.9
Labour gain from Conservative		Swing	+14.7	

Crome
Party	Candidate	Votes	%	±%
Labour	George Nobbs *	1,061	49.3	+15.8
UKIP	Ann Williams	506	23.5	+23.5
Conservative	Jonathan Emsell	342	15.9	−13.5
Green	Judith Ford	173	8.0	−13.4
Liberal Democrats	Jane Wright	71	3.3	−12.4
Majority		555	25.8	+21.7
Turnout		2,153	29.6	−5.0
Labour hold		Swing	−3.9	

Eaton
Party	Candidate	Votes	%	±%
Liberal Democrats	Brian Watkins	1,460	41.3	−0.2
Conservative	Anthony Little	1,034	29.2	−7.7
Labour	Jack Sinclair	647	18.3	+9.7
Green	Jane Saunders	396	11.2	−1.8
Majority		426	12.0	+7.4
Turnout		3,537	48.7	−8.5
Liberal Democrats hold		Swing	+3.7	

Lakenham
Party	Candidate	Votes	%	±%
Labour Co-op	Susan Whitaker *	1,149	50.6	+23.8
Liberal Democrats	David Fairbairn	539	23.7	−7.9
Green	Tim Jones	323	14.2	+1.5
Conservative	Mathew Morris	259	11.4	−1.6
Majority		610	26.9	+22.0
Turnout		2,270	31.1	−8.4
Labour gain from Liberal Democrats		Swing	+15.9	

Mancroft
Party	Candidate	Votes	%	±%
Green	Richard Bearman *	1,140	44.7	+2.9
Labour	Stephanie Friend	906	35.5	+16.5
Conservative	Thomas Stringer	328	12.9	−6.3
Liberal Democrats	Jeremy Hooke	175	6.9	−13.1
Majority		234	9.2	−12.7
Turnout		2,549	31.8	−4.2
Green hold		Swing	−6.8	

Mile Cross
Party	Candidate	Votes	%	±%
Labour	Deborah Gihawi	913	44.6	+15.3
Green	Richard Edwards *	435	21.2	−8.3
UKIP	John Youles	397	19.4	+19.4
Conservative	Simon Harrison	217	10.6	−15.5
Liberal Democrats	Sarah Cunningham	86	4.2	−11.0
Majority		478	23.3	+23.1
Turnout		2,048	26.1	−2.3
Labour gain from Green		Swing	+11.8	

Nelson
Party	Candidate	Votes	%	±%
Green	Andrew Boswell *	1,341	54.0	−9.8
Labour	Layla Dickerson	775	31.2	+18.4
Conservative	Alexandra Davies	221	8.9	−1.9
Liberal Democrats	Helen Whitworth	147	5.9	−6.8
Majority		566	22.8	−28.2
Turnout		2,484	34.3	−11.2
Green hold		Swing	−14.1	

Sewell
Party	Candidate	Votes	%	±%
Labour	Julie Brociek-Coulton	805	36.8	+10.1
Green	Jonathan Hill	631	28.8	−3.8
UKIP	Glenn Tingle	368	16.8	+16.8
Conservative	Evelyn Collishaw	322	14.7	−7.1
Liberal Democrats	Stuart Beadle	64	2.9	−15.9
Majority		174	7.9	+2.0
Turnout		2,190	28.0	−6.1
Labour gain from Green		Swing	+6.9	

Thorpe Hamlet
Party	Candidate	Votes	%	±%
Green	Adrian Dearnley	959	38.1	−8.0
Labour	Eamonn Burgess	772	30.7	+17.0
Conservative	Philip Hardy *	567	22.5	+3.3
Liberal Democrats	Simon Nobbs	217	8.6	−12.3
Majority		187	7.4	−17.9
Turnout		2,515	28.4	−8.8
Green hold		Swing	−12.5	

Town Close
Party	Candidate	Votes	%	±%
Labour Co-op	Emma Corlett	1,234	39.1	+25.8
Green	Paul Neale	1,117	35.4	−7.3
Conservative	Barry Chochrane	604	19.1	−0.9
Liberal Democrats	Roderic Beale	203	6.4	−17.6
Majority		117	3.7	−15.0
Turnout		3,158	37.4	−7.1
Labour gain from Green		Swing	+25.8	

University
Party	Candidate	Votes	%	±%
Labour	Bert Bremner *	1,137	62.6	+21.9
Green	Elliot Folan	371	20.4	−15.1
Conservative	Thomas Cannon	192	10.6	−2.7
Liberal Democrats	Philip Jimenez	117	6.4	−4.1
Majority		766	42.2	+37.0
Turnout		1,817	24.1	−9.9
Labour hold		Swing	+18.5	

Wensum
Party	Candidate	Votes	%	±%
Green	Elizabeth Morgan	1,035	45.9	−3.5
Labour	Martin Peek	877	38.9	+16.9
Conservative	Joe Ferris	246	10.9	−6.5
Liberal Democrats	Alex Barry	95	4.2	−7.0
Majority		158	7.0	−20.4
Turnout		2,253	27.3	−4.6
Green hold		Swing	−10.2	

=== South Norfolk ===
District Summary

Party	Seats	+/-	Votes	%	+/-
Conservative	11	Steady	14,627	43.2	
Liberal Democrat	1	Steady	4,664	13.8	
UKIP	0	Steady	6,136	18.1	
Labour	0	Steady	4,544	13.4	
Independent	0	Steady	2,053	6.1	
Green	0	Steady	1,840	5.4	

Division Results

Clavering
Party	Candidate	Votes	%	±%
Conservative	Margaret Somerville	906	31.4	−8.2
UKIP	Carole Bryant	712	24.7	+7.3
Liberal Democrats	Andrew Barber	644	22.3	−4.0
Labour	Stephen Simmonds	356	12.3	+6.2
Green	Derek West	271	9.4	−1.4
Majority		194	6.7	−6.6
Turnout		2,889	33.7	−11.2
Conservative hold		Swing	−7.8	

Costessey
Party	Candidate	Votes	%	±%
Liberal Democrats	Tim East *	1,108	38.0	−16.8
UKIP	Tom Burkard	614	21.1	+21.1
Conservative	Andrew Pond	568	19.5	−5.2
Labour	Cid Gibbs	420	14.4	+7.8
Green	Ian Boreham	203	7.0	−6.6
Majority		494	17.0	−13.1
Turnout		2,913	28.2	−9.4
Liberal Democrats hold		Swing	−18.9	

Diss & Roydon
Party	Candidate	Votes	%	±%
Conservative	Jenny Chamberlin *	1,115	44.2	−12.9
UKIP	Sam Patel	552	21.9	+21.9
Labour	Scott Huggins	382	15.1	+7.8
Liberal Democrats	Trevor Wenman	243	9.6	−26.1
Green	Jacob Eccleston	232	9.2	+9.2
Majority		563	22.3	+1.0
Turnout		2,524	31.5	−5.0
Conservative hold		Swing	−17.4	

East Depwade
Party	Candidate	Votes	%	±%
Conservative	Martin Wilby *	1,473	63.2	+11.2
Liberal Democrats	Gillian Artis	459	19.7	−22.3
Labour	Linda Bellos	398	17.1	+11.0
Majority		1,014	43.5	+33.5
Turnout		2,330	30.6	−11.0
Conservative hold		Swing	+16.7	

Forehoe
Party	Candidate	Votes	%	±%
Conservative	Colin Foulger	825	29.0	−21.3
Independent	John Herbert *	527	18.5	+18.5
UKIP	Jeremy Kent	517	18.2	+18.2
Liberal Democrats	Bob McClenning	469	16.5	−16.4
Labour	Nigel Crouch	324	11.4	+6.0
Green	Roy Walmsley	186	6.5	−4.9
Majority		298	10.5	−7.0
Turnout		2,848	33.8	−11.2
Conservative hold		Swing	−19.9	

Henstead
Party	Candidate	Votes	%	±%
Conservative	Roger Smith *	1,111	42.3	−6.9
UKIP	Ronald Murphy	580	22.1	+22.1
Labour	Nicola Fowler	436	16.6	+9.3
Liberal Democrats	Philippa Grant	299	11.4	−19.5
Independent	Ingo Wagenknecht	199	7.6	+7.6
Majority		531	20.2	+1.9
Turnout		2,625	35.5	−12.1
Conservative hold		Swing	−14.5	

Hingham
Party	Candidate	Votes	%	±%
Conservative	Margaret Dewsbury	1,284	59.7	+3.0
Green	Peter Eldridge	404	18.8	+18.8
Labour	Graham Hayden	294	13.7	+5.3
Liberal Democrats	Paul Blathwayt	169	7.9	−27.1
Majority		880	40.9	+19.1
Turnout		2,151	32.2	−12.4
Conservative hold		Swing	−7.9	

Humbleyard
Party	Candidate	Votes	%	±%
Conservative	Judith Virgo *	1,306	45.5	−6.5
UKIP	Ralph Evans	577	20.1	+20.1
Labour	Victoria Smillie	390	13.6	+5.6
Green	Andrew Panes	352	12.3	−3.2
Liberal Democrats	Margaret Pitcher	248	8.6	−16.0
Majority		729	25.4	−2.0
Turnout		2,873	33.1	−13.8
Conservative hold		Swing	−13.3	

Loddon
Party	Candidate	Votes	%	±%
Conservative	Adrian Gunson *	2,001	63.7	−13.9
UKIP	Alan Baugh	594	18.9	+18.9
Labour	David Reekie	383	12.2	+6.3
Liberal Democrats	Judith Tryggvason	163	5.2	−6.9
Majority		1,407	44.8	−20.7
Turnout		3,141	37.6	−11.2
Conservative hold		Swing	−16.4	

Long Stratton
Party	Candidate	Votes	%	±%
Conservative	Alison Thomas *	1,115	42.8	−14.8
UKIP	David Thornton	658	25.3	+25.3
Labour Co-op	Deborah Sacks	371	14.2	+6.9
Liberal Democrats	Linden Parker	269	10.3	−24.7
Green	Daniel Scott	192	7.4	+7.4
Majority		457	17.5	−5.1
Turnout		2,605	33.5	−9.0
Conservative hold		Swing	−20.0	

West Depwade
Party	Candidate	Votes	%	±%
Conservative	Bev Spratt *	1,531	46.2	−18.0
UKIP	Ashley Christopher	829	25.0	+25.0
Liberal Democrats	Ian Spratt	508	15.3	−12.7
Labour	Pamela Reekie	446	13.5	+5.9
Majority		702	21.2	−15.3
Turnout		3314	37.2	−9.7
Conservative hold		Swing	−21.7	

Wymondham
Party	Candidate	Votes	%	±%
Conservative	Joe Mooney *	1,392	38.1	−25.3
Independent	Andy Gardiner	1,203	33.0	+33.0
UKIP	Peter Colby	503	13.8	+13.8
Labour	Kevin O'Grady	344	9.4	+0.6
Liberal Democrats	Paul Seeman	85	2.3	−14.7
Independent	Paco Davila Davila	62	1.7	+1.7
Independent	Mike Welton	62	1.7	+1.7
Majority		189	5.2	−41.3
Turnout		3,651	38.9	−5.4
Conservative hold		Swing	−29.1	
