= Gayton le Marsh =

Village and civil parish in the East Lindsey district of Lincolnshire, England

Coordinates: 53.335945°N 0.139465°E

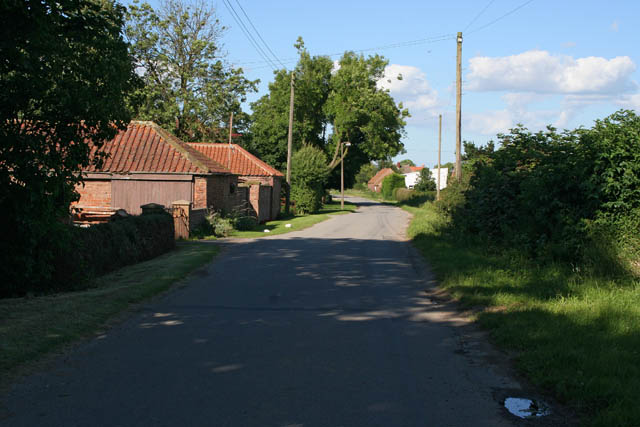
- Gayton le Marsh village

- Location within Lincolnshire
- Population: 155 (2011)
- OS grid reference: TF425842
  - London: 125 mi (201 km) S
- District: East Lindsey
- Shire county: Lincolnshire
- Region: East Midlands
- Country: England
- Sovereign state: United Kingdom
- Post town: Alford
- Postcode district: LN13
- Police: Lincolnshire
- Fire: Lincolnshire
- Ambulance: East Midlands
- UK Parliament: Louth and Horncastle (UK Parliament constituency)

Gayton le Marsh is a village and civil parish in the East Lindsey district of Lincolnshire, England It is situated 6 miles (9.7 km) south-east from the town of Louth and about 6 miles (9.7 km) north from Alford. The population of the civil parish was 155 at the 2011 census.

Gayton le Marsh parish church was dedicated to Saint George. It had a western tower, was rebuilt in 1847, and was demolished in 1971.

A red-brick drainage pumping station was built here about 1850, which is now a Grade II listed building.

Gayton le Marsh CE School was built as a National School in 1837, and closed in 1924.
