= Gayton, Norfolk =

Village in Norfolk, England

Coordinates: 52.744°N 0.557°E

Gayton
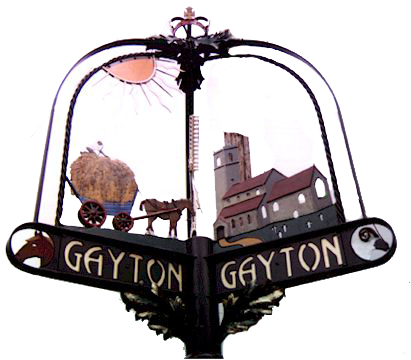
- Gayton Village Sign

- Location within Norfolk
- Area: 8.82 sq mi (22.8 km^{2})
- Population: 1,637 (2021 census)
  - Density: 186/sq mi (72/km^{2})
- OS grid reference: TF720190
  - London: 109 miles (175 km)
- Civil parish: Gayton
- District: Kings Lynn and West Norfolk
- Shire county: Norfolk
- Region: East
- Country: England
- Sovereign state: United Kingdom
- Post town: KING'S LYNN
- Postcode district: PE32
- Dialling code: 01553
- Police: Norfolk
- Fire: Norfolk
- Ambulance: East of England
- UK Parliament: North West Norfolk

Gayton is a village and civil parish in the English county of Norfolk.

Gayton is located 6 miles (9.7 km) east of King's Lynn and 32 miles (51 km) north-west of Norwich, along the Gaywood River and the B1145.

== History ==
Gayton's name is of Anglo-Saxon and Viking origin and derives from either the Old Norse for 'goat settlement' or the Old English for 'Gaega's settlement'.

In the Domesday Book, Gayton is recorded as a settlement of 51 households in the hundred of Freebridge. In 1086, the village was divided between the estates of William de Warenne, William d'Ecouis, Hugh de Montfort and Henry de Ferrers.

Well Hall once stood in the parish, it was built around 1700 on the site of a Benedictine monastery.

== Geography ==
According to the 2021 census, Gayton has a population of 1,637 people which shows an increase from the 1,432 people listed in the 2011 census.

Gayton is located along the course of the Gaywood River and at the junction of B1145, between King's Lynn and Mundesley, and the B1153, between Narborough and Brancaster.

== St. Nicholas' Church ==
Gayton's parish church is dedicated to Saint Nicholas and dates from the Fourteenth Century. St. Nicholas' is located within the village on Lynn Road and has been Grade I listed since 1960. The church no longer holds Sunday services, however, it remains open daily to visitors.

The church holds a font dating from the Fourteenth Century as well as a more modern sculpture by the Swedish artist, Britt Wikstrom. There is also a memorial in the church to Captain Douglas H. Marsham who was killed serving with the British South Africa Police at the Siege of Mafeking as well as a restored memorial to the fallen in the First World War of the Gayton Lodge of the Odd Fellows.

== Gayton Hall ==
Gayton Hall was built in the early-Nineteenth Century by Andrew St John, Baron St John of Bletso whose family eventually sold the estate to Charles Marsham, 4th Earl of Romney. Romney's descendant, Julian Marsham, the 8th Earl, is the current owner of the hall.

== Amenities ==
There is one pub in the village, The Crown. The village also has a butcher's shop, Gayton Goslings care/daycare centre, a hair salon, a fish and chip shop and petrol station combining convenience shop/post office. The village formerly had a windmill and is currently seeing a large increase in the building of residential housing.

Gayton Church of England Primary School is located within the village and is part of the Diocese of Norwich Academies Trust. The headteachers is Mrs N. Allitt.

== Notable residents ==
- Julian Marsham- (born 1948) peer, lives in Gayton.
- Martin Brundle OBE- (born 1959) retired racing driver and commentator, lives in Gayton.

== Governance ==
Gayton is part of the electoral ward of Gayton & Grimston for local elections and is part of the district of King's Lynn and West Norfolk.

The village's national constituency is North West Norfolk which has been represented by the Conservative's James Wild MP since 2010.

== War Memorial ==
Gayton War Memorial is a wooden lychgate at the entrance to St. Nicholas' Churchyard. The memorial lists the following names for the First World War:

Rank	Name	Unit	Date of death	Burial/Commemoration
Cpl.	George Griffin	1/5th Bn., Norfolk Regiment	12 Aug. 1915	Helles Memorial
LCpl.	Stanley Reader	1st Bn., Bedfordshire Regiment	27 Sep. 1918	Fifteen Ravine Cemetery
Pte.	Henry T. Gage	886th (MT) Coy., Army Service Corps	2 Aug. 1917	Dozinghem Cemetery
Pte.	Reuben Meek	6th (Melbourne) Bn., AIF	26 Jul. 1916	Serre Road Cemetery
Pte.	Harold Meek	1st Bn., Essex Regiment	14 Apr. 1917	Arras Memorial
Pte.	Robert R. Shinn	1st Bn., Essex Regt.	14 Apr. 1917	Arras Memorial
Pte.	Alfred D. Nicholls	12th Bn., Royal Fusiliers	3 Aug. 1917	Menin Gate
Pte.	H. Sidney Marsters	Labour Corps	10 Nov. 1918	King's Lynn Cemetery
Pte.	Hedley G. Littleproud	2/7th Bn., Lancashire Fusiliers	31 Mar. 1918	Sains Cemetery
Pte.	George J. Hogger	10th Bn., Lincolnshire Regiment	28 Apr. 1917	Arras Memorial
Pte.	Ralph H. Cullum	163rd Coy., Machine Gun Corps	27 Dec. 1917	Gaza War Cemetery
Pte.	Thornah S. Littleproud	2nd Bn., Norfolk Regiment	25 Aug. 1917	Amara War Cemetery
Pte.	Arthur Bland	1/5th Bn., Norfolk Regt.	19 Apr. 1917	Gaza War Cemetery
Pte.	Ernest Medlock	1/5th Bn., Norfolk Regt.	28 Aug. 1915	Helles Memorial
Pte.	Ernest E. Nicholls	1/5th Bn., Norfolk Regt.	3 Nov. 1917	Deir al-Balah Cemetery
Pte.	Ernest Angell	8th Bn., Norfolk Regt.	1 Jul. 1916	Thiepval Memorial
Pte.	James H. Hunter	9th Bn., Norfolk Regt.	15 Apr. 1918	Tyne Cot
Pte.	George Thrower	2nd Bn., Sherwood Foresters	23 Mar. 1918	Arras Memorial
Rfn.	Frank Lewis	9th Bn., Rifle Brigade	26 Mar. 1917	Avesnes Cemetery

The following names were added after the Second World War:

Rank	Name	Unit	Date of death	Burial/Commemoration
LCpl.	Geoffrey H. R. Dunthorne	Royal Army Service Corps	6 Sep. 1944	Schoonselhof Cemetery
Dvr.	Leslie A. Pearce	R.A.S.C.	12 Mar. 1944	St. Nicholas' Churchyard
Gnr.	Clifford E. Howard	51 (L.A.A.) Regt., Royal Artillery	12 Dec. 1942	Massicault War Cemetery
