= Gaywood River =

River in Norfolk, England

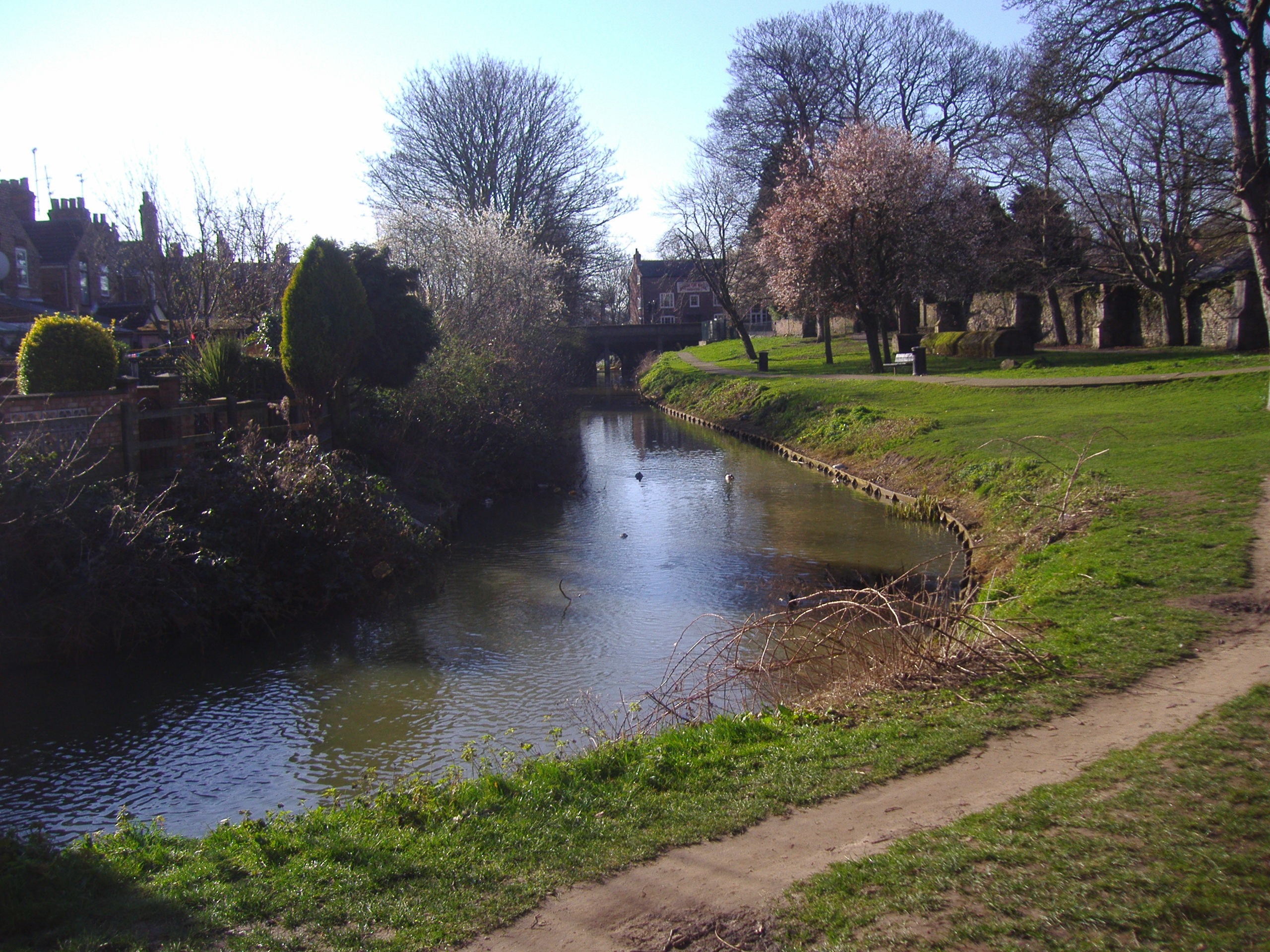
- Gaywood River at Kettlewell mill

- Location of the river mouth within Norfolk

Location
- Country: England
- County: Norfolk
- Region: East of England
- District: North West Norfolk

Physical characteristics
- Source: In Derby Fen, North west of the village of Gayton, Norfolk
- Mouth: At King's Lynn in to the River Great Ouse
  - coordinates: 52°45′0″N 0°23′38″E
- Length: 6.7 mi (10.8 km)

Gaywood River (sometimes known as the River Gay or River Gaywood or, in King's Lynn, as the Mill Fleet) is a tributary of the River Great Ouse in the west of the county of Norfolk. Its source is 11 metres above sea level, northwest of the village of Gayton in Derby Fen, Map Reference TF 705 209. It runs for 6.7 miles (10.8 km) to its outflow into the River Great Ouse in the town of King's Lynn. It is one of the World's rare chalk streams.

Derby Fen is the remnant of a valley fen system once found in these parts. The remnant supports a range of habitats from dry calcareous to damp acidic grasslands and heath which all rely on the river. From Derby Fen the stream runs under Leziate Drove and along the southern side of Sugar Fen, after which the river passes into the open countryside.

In recent years, attempts have been made to restore the river to its original meandering course in this section of the river. With these improvements there have been recordings of water vole and also otter sightings. The river also has a small trout population, although only the lower reaches of the river support any coarse fishing. Just north of the village of Bawsey the river passes under a disused railway track bed and crosses the countryside westwards; the river skirts to the north of the ruins of St. James' Church which stands on the small hill to the south of the river. Then the river passes under the A149, King's Lynn to Hunstanton road. Progressing into its lower reaches and entering the outskirts of King's Lynn, the river banks have been the subject of much flood defence work. Skirting the southern side of South Wootton, the river passes under the A148 and turns southwards alongside a residential street called Riverside for a short distance before running along the eastern boundary of a sports fields close to King's Lynn Leisure Centre. At this point it is now in the district of King's Lynn called Gaywood, and here the river runs alongside River Lane before it dog-legs west towards the town centre along Swan Lane. From Swan Lane it passes through some open land and the allotments to the south before changing direction south again by Kettlewell Lane.

== Kettle Watermill ==
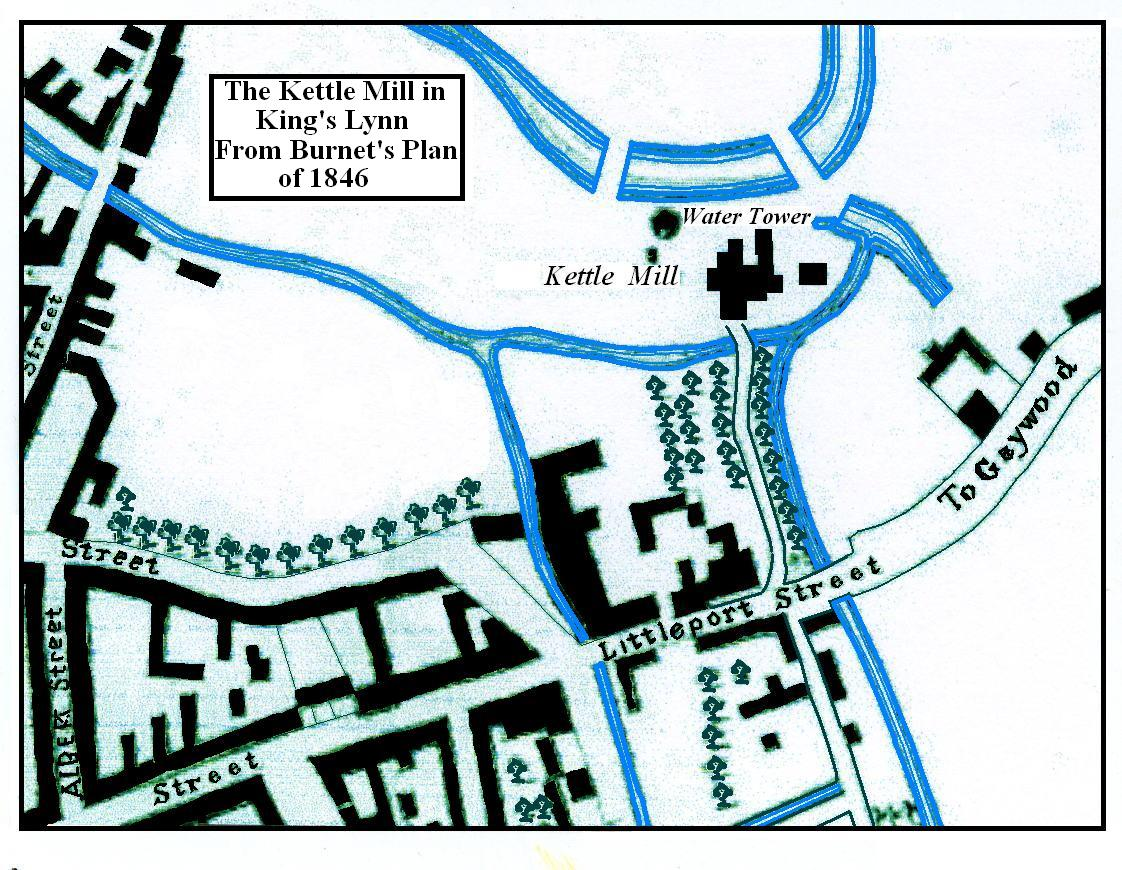
Map of the Kettle Mill in 1846

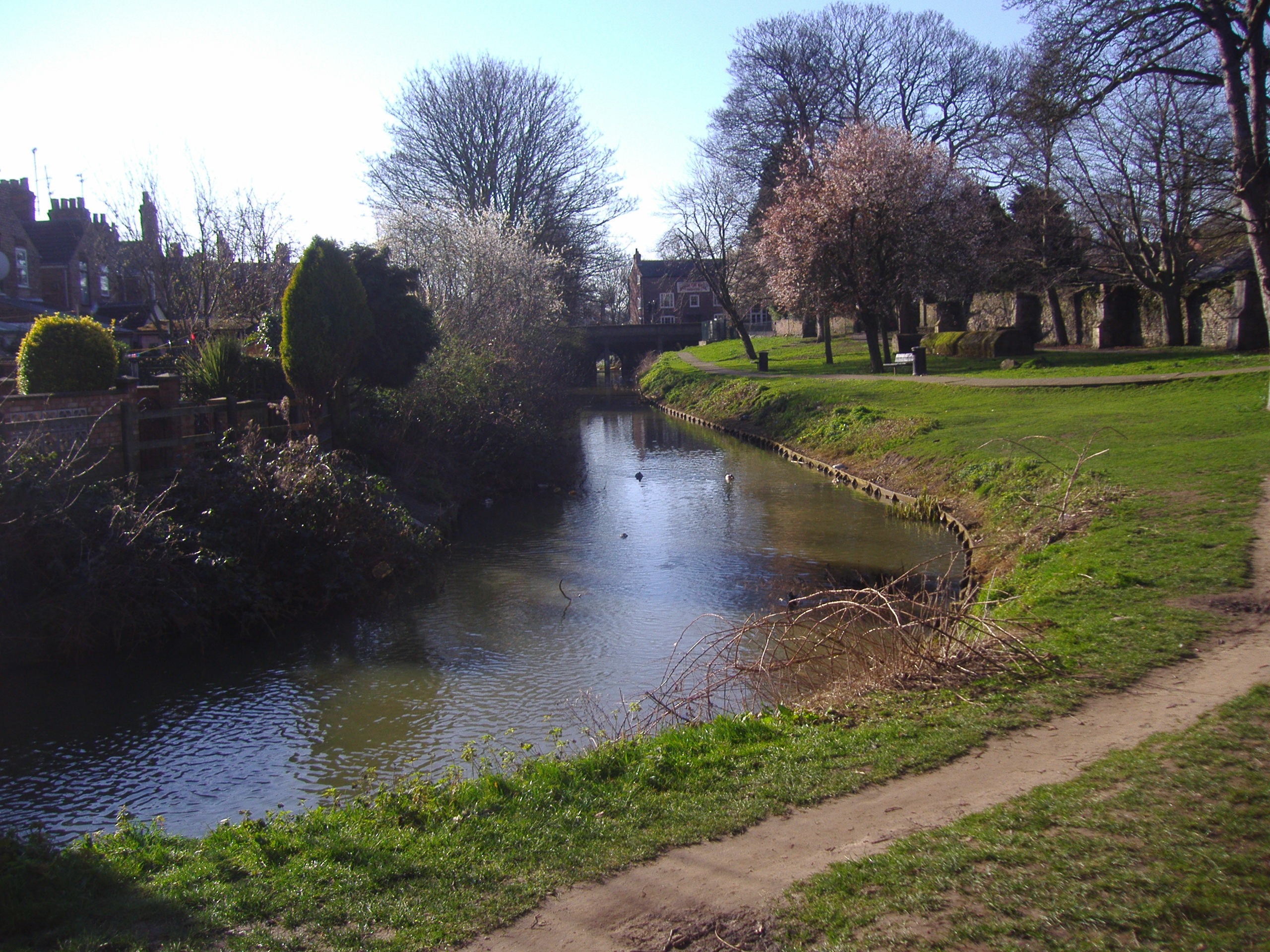
The river close to the site of Kettle Watermill.

It was on the bend at the top of Kettlewell Lane that the mill once stood and was known as King's Lynn Kettle Watermill. The first record shows it as being a building housing lepers. Kettle Mills does not ever appear to have ever been a manufacturing mill. However, at one point during its rich and varied career it was certainly driven by the waters of the Gaywood.

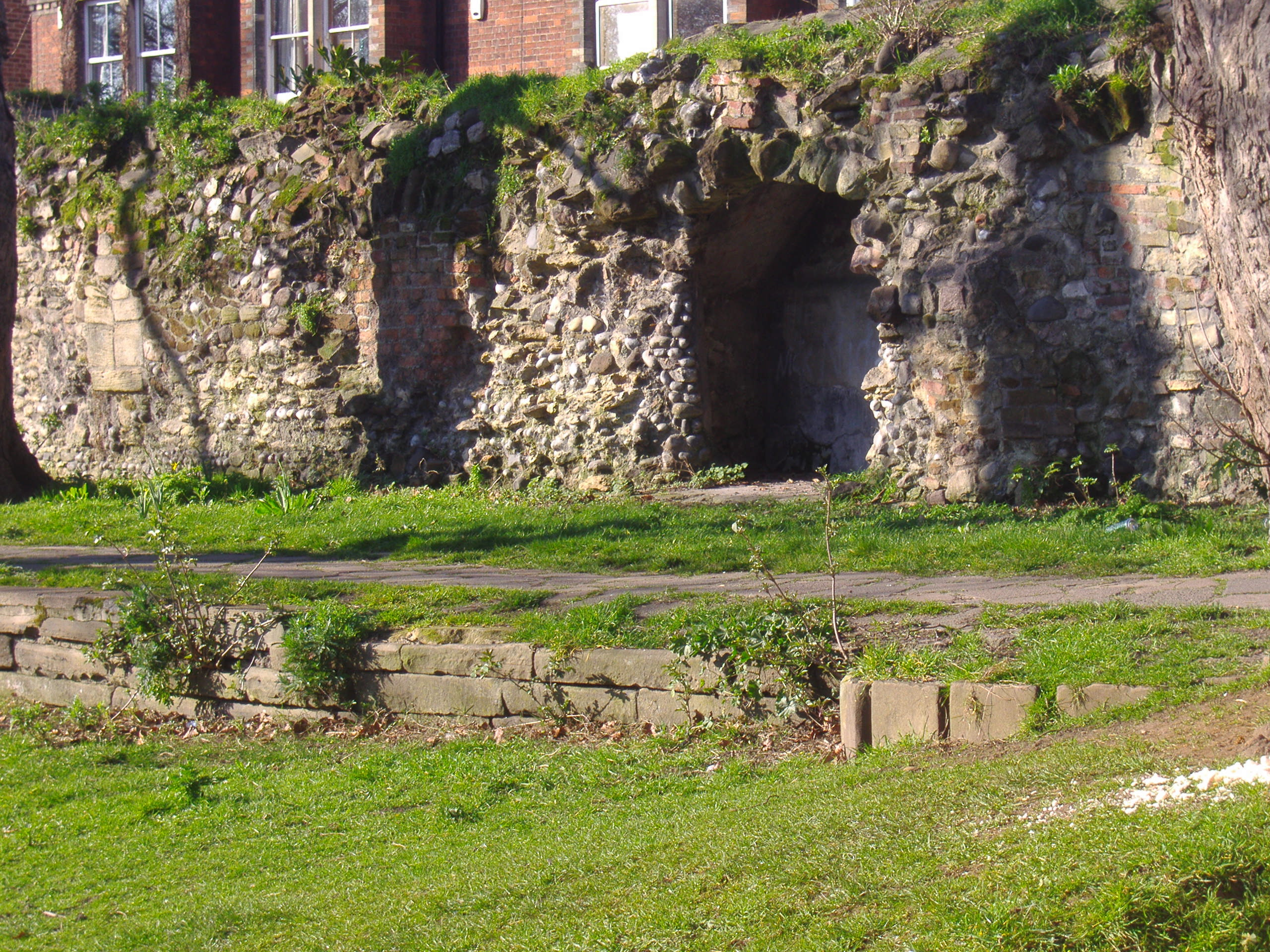
Old Town wall adjacent the river near Kettle Watermill.

Kettle Mill was so called because the mill in the area was originally horse powered and was in operation by the beginning of the 15th century, its purpose being to draw water from the river (in kettle-like containers) to supply the town's freshwater conduits. One of the earliest of which ran from the Kettlemill down Damgate to Gresemarket, with a connection south to the Saturday marketplace. The inventor of this system is said to have been one Peter Morrys, a Dutchman, and his system was adopted not only in King's Lynn, but also in Hull and other large towns and London where several of the wooden pipes were dug up in the area of Marble Arch, elm being the favourite wood as it was more capable of standing up to conditions and pressure than cheaper timbers. This system would eventually be found to be wasteful and dangerous to health as the pipes and pits were near to cesspools and drains. Several of these tree pipes have fairly recently been unearthed in New Conduit Street dated early 19th century. Later Kettlemill was used as a coal-fired electricity plant but was eventually demolished to make way for the offices of the Local Drainage Board. At the southern end of Kettlewell Lane, the river passes under the A148, Littleport Street heading south, it then passes through a culvert underneath the main railway lines to King's Lynn station.

== The "Walks" and more watermills ==
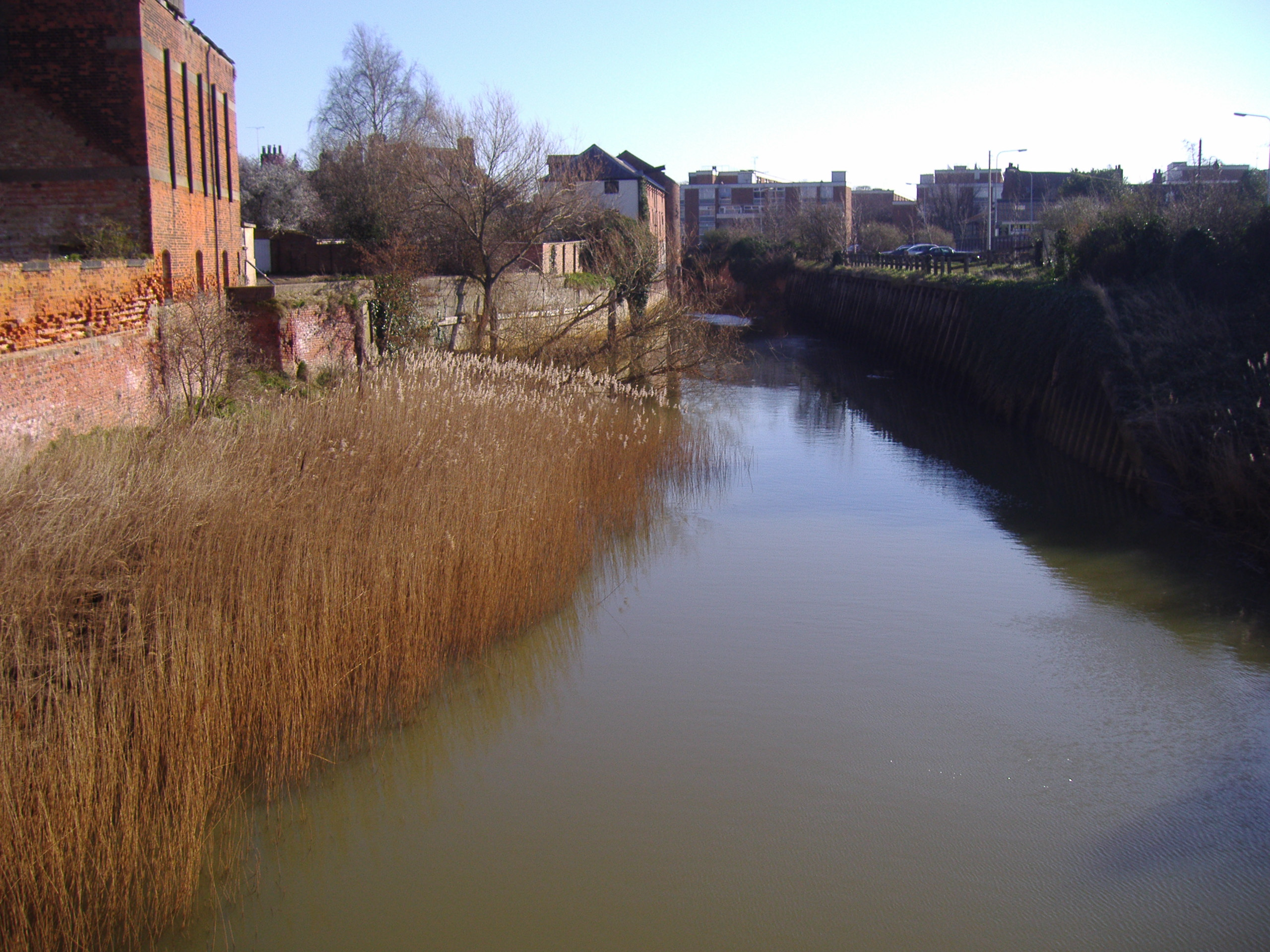
The River Gaywood at Stongate, King's Lynn.

Past the railway culvert, the river curls through the gardens and parkland of what is known as the "Walks". In this parkland remnants of the town wall can still be seen. Also in this vicinity it is thought there was another watermill for corn called the Oyle Mil. The river now heading westwards again reaches London Road where it is thought once stood another watermill called Town Mill. The mill probably stood at the top of the Millfleet near the almshouses. The mill was a single-storey stone building with the two-storey miller's house adjacent and probably stood on the same site as the earlier Swagges Mill. The mill was probably demolished to make way for the London Road in the 19th century.

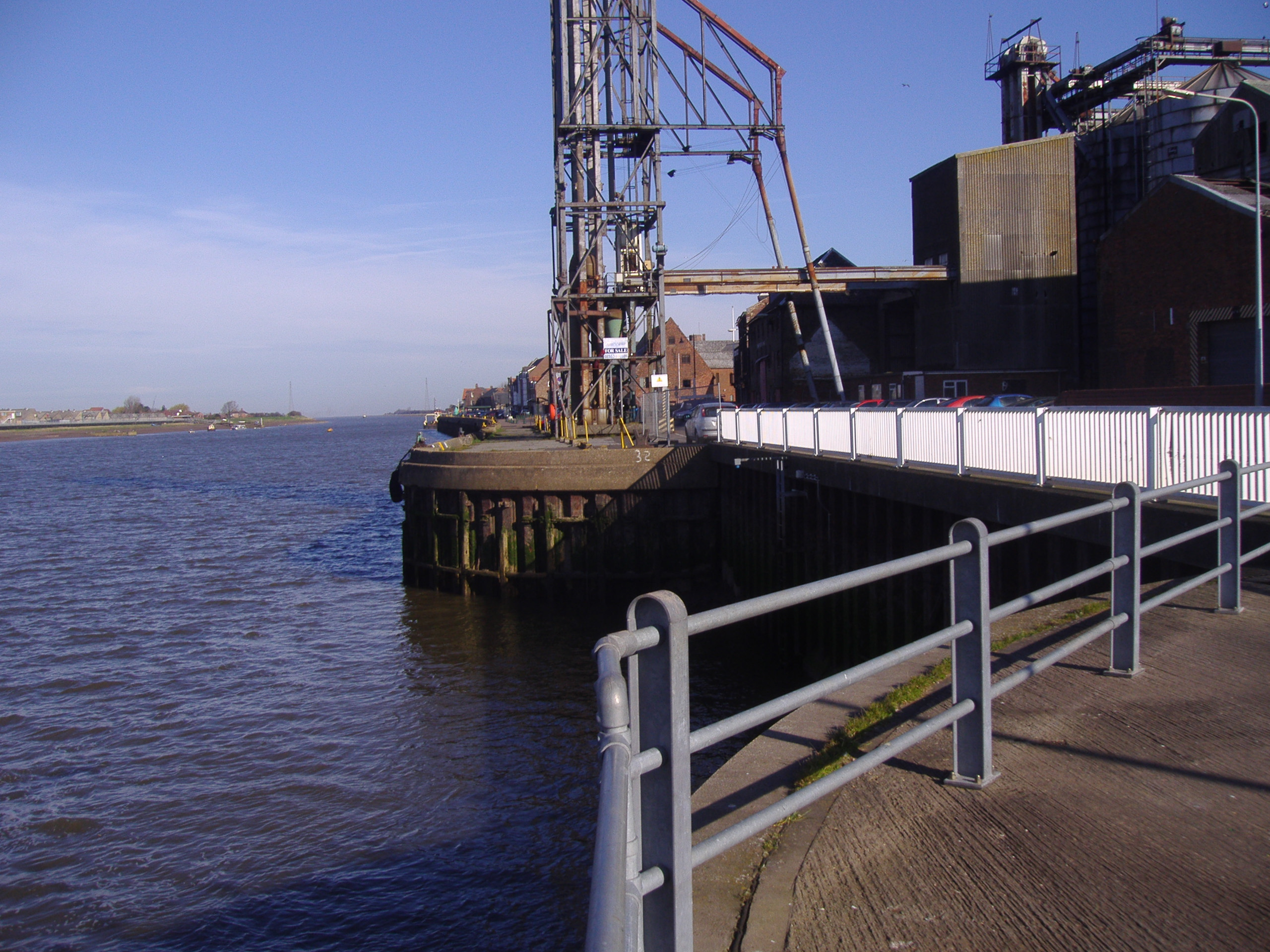
The mouth of the River Gaywood.

At this site the watercourse enters another culvert which passes under the length of Millfleet and then Stonegate Street. At the western end of Stonegate Street, the river leaves the culvert and in a short distance, at the southern end of the South Quay, it outfalls into the River Great Ouse.
