= Gayton Windmill, Norfolk =

Windmill in Gayton, Norfolk, England

Gayton Windmill
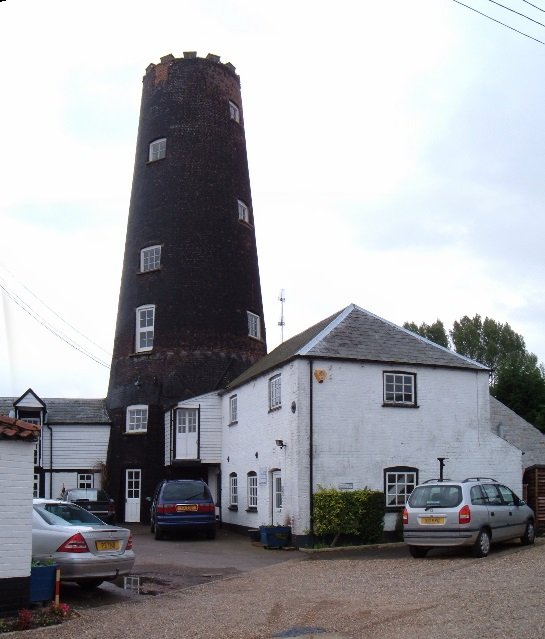
- The mill in 2006
- Interactive map of Gayton Windmill

Origin
- Mill name: Gayton Mill
- Grid reference: TF 7322 1927
- Coordinates: 52.743356°N 0.564771°E
- Operator: Private
- Year built: c1824

Information
- Purpose: Corn
- Type: Tower mill
- Storeys: Eight storeys
- No. of sails: Four sails
- Type of sails: Patent sails
- Windshaft: Cast iron
- Winding: Fantail
- Fantail blades: Six blades
- Auxiliary power: Steam engine, later a paraffin engine then a diesel engine
- No. of pairs of millstones: Three pairs, plus a further three pairs driven by auxiliary engine
- Size of millstones: One pair Peak stones 4 feet (1.22 m) diameter, one pair French Burr stones 4 feet 2 inches (1.27 m) diameter.
- Year lost: Truncated post 1937

For the Gayton Windmill now in Merseyside see Gayton Windmill, Cheshire

Gayton Mill is a Grade II listed tower mill at Gayton, Norfolk, England which has been truncated and converted to holiday accommodation.

== History ==
A post mill was standing at Gayton (TF 7355 1925) in 1797 when it was marked of Faden's map of Norfolk. The mill was advertised for sale in 1815 and 1819. The tower mill had been built by 1824, when it was marked on the first edition Ordnance Survey map of Norfolk. Robert Matthews was the miller in 1836. In 1872, the mill was offered to let. By then a steam mill powered by a 8 horsepower (6.0 kW) Clayton & Shuttleworth steam engine was working an additional three pairs of French Burr millstones. The mills were taken by Edward Lewis, who had previously been at a watermill at West Acre. The mill was sold by auction on 23 September 1873 at the Globe Hotel, King's Lynn. It was bought by Edward Lewis. The mills remained in the Lewis family, and a limited company, Gayton Mills Co Ltd, was formed in 1919. The mill had ceased working by wind at this time, power being provided by a Blackstone paraffin engine. The engine was later replaced by a diesel engine. The sails were removed c1925. The mills were worked by engine until 1937. The mill retained its cap and fanstage in 1933 but had become derelict by 1949. The cap and top storey of the mill had been removed by the time the mill buildings were advertised for sale by auction in King's Lynn on 29 July 1980. They were withdrawn from the auction and later sold privately. The new owners converted the mill to a residential craft centre. They also planned to restore the cap and sails of the mill. In 1987, planning permission was granted to use the mill as seasonal holiday accommodation.

== Description ==
Gayton Mill was an eight storey tower mill with a stage at the third floor. The tower is 22 feet (6.71 m) inside diameter at base level, with walls 2 feet (610 mm) thick. It had an ogee cap, and was winded by a six bladed fantail. It had four Patent sails and drove three pairs of overdrift millstones. The surviving stone nut is of cast iron with wooden teeth. The upright shaft is partly wooden and partly cast iron. The great spur wheel is cast iron, it has a cast iron crown wheel underneath. The tower has been truncated by one storey and the top is crenellated.

== Millers ==
- Robert Matthews 1836–1846
- Walter Hall 1853–1872
- Edward Lewis 1872–1892
- Henry Lewis 1896–900
- Alred Lewis 1998–919
  - Alfred Littleproud 1901
- Gayton Mills Co 1912–1919
- Gayton Mills Co Ltd 1919–1937

Reference for above:-
