= Ophaboom Theatre Company =

English theatre

The Ophaboom Theatre Company (1991–2007) was an English physical theatre company specializing in contemporary works in the Italian Commedia dell'Arte tradition. Ophaboom was founded in 1991 by Geoff Beale and Howard Gayton. The troupe performed both in traditional theatre spaces as well as on street corners and other less conventional venues.

Although based in London, Ophaboom was primarily a touring company. With the aid of Arts Council England, they toured throughout the British Isles and continental Europe. They were the first English company to appear at the Medieval Festival in Le Puy-en-Velay, and they performed four times at the Carnival of Venice.

Performances included comic adaptations of Shakespeare.

== See also ==
- Jacques Lecoq
