= 2026 in United Kingdom politics and government =

A list of events relating to politics and government in the United Kingdom during 2026.

== Events ==
=== January ===
- 1 January –
  - In his new year message, Prime Minister Keir Starmer says his government will "defeat the decline and division offered by others" and that 2026 will see people feeling "positive change" in their lives.
  - In her new year message, the leader of the opposition Kemi Badenoch says that in 2025 there was "no growth, higher taxes and record unemployment" and that the plan for her party would "back business and fix our economy so we can fund our armed forces, police, schools, NHS and build something that we feel proud of".
  - In his new year message, the leader of the Liberal Democrats, Ed Davey, says that his party could "win again in 2026" after their "record-breaking success" in the previous local elections. He also said he would "stop Trump's America becoming Farage's Britain" and "change our country for the better".
  - In his new year message, Nigel Farage, the leader of Reform UK, which has led in national opinion polls since early 2025, says that his party is offering "hope" and "change", predicting that May would be "the single most important set of elections between now and the next general election" and that the country is getting "gloomier" and "poorer", and that with higher unemployment and debt is "running completely out of control".
  - In her new year message, Rachel Millward, the Green Party's co-deputy leader, says they would "do everything" they can "to stop Nigel Farage getting anywhere near Downing Street". Mothin Ali, the other co-deputy, said the party had gained 110,000 new members since the summer and that they are "here to replace Labour".
- 2 January – Mike Nesbitt announces he is stepping down as leader of the Ulster Unionist Party.
- 3 January – Starmer says that the UK was not involved in the US strikes on Venezuela, which resulted in the capture of its president Nicolas Maduro.
- 5 January –
  - Starmer says that Greenland, a Danish territory, should decide its own future, after President Donald Trump suggests the US could invade it.
  - Dame Emily Thornberry, who chairs the House of Commons Foreign Affairs Committee, describes the US action in Venezuela as a breach of international law, and says that the UK should make clear it is "unacceptable".
  - Foreign Secretary Yvette Cooper tells the House of Commons she has reminded her US counterpart of that country's obligations under international law following the capture of Maduro.
- 6 January –
  - In Scotland, Cabinet Secretary for Justice Angela Constance is found by an investigation to have broken the ministerial code with comments she made about a grooming gangs expert in parliament.
  - The Scottish Parliament confirms that MSPs will receive a 4.3% pay rise from April, taking their annual income from £74,507 to £77,710.
- 7 January –
  - Starmer says that MPs will vote on the deployment of British troops to Ukraine.
  - Laila Cunningham is announced as the Reform candidate for the 2028 London mayoral election.
- 8 January – The House of Lords votes to approve a proposal to allow more time for it to debate the Terminally Ill Adults (End of Life) Bill.
- 11 January –
  - Peter Mandelson is interviewed on Sunday with Laura Kuenssberg about Jeffrey Epstein. Kemi Badenoch says a Conservative government would ban social media for under 16s.
  - The government releases a pothole map, showing how various local authorities are faring in tackling them. The map is accompanied by a new traffic light rating system.
- 12 January –
  - Former Conservative Party Chancellor Nadhim Zahawi defects to Reform UK.
  - Michael Forsyth is elected as the new Speaker of the House of Lords, succeeding John McFall.
  - Grok sexual deepfake scandal: Science Secretary Liz Kendall announces the enabling of offences against the creation, or the request for creation, of intimate images of another person who has not consented to this, for example by using Generative AI, provided for in the Data (Use and Access) Act 2025, in response to the Grok AI image generation scandal. Social Democratic and Labour Party MLA Cara Hunter, who was the victim of a deepfake video, quits social media platform X due to what she describes as a "complete negligence in protecting women and children online".
- 13 January –
  - The UK government drops plans to require people to sign up to their digital ID card scheme in order to prove their eligibility to work in the UK.
  - Finance Secretary Shona Robison delivers the 2026 Scottish budget, which includes changes to tax thresholds, an increase in taxation on residential properties worth over £1m and an increase in the Scottish Child Payment.
- 15 January –
  - Malcolm Offord is announced as the leader of Reform UK in Scotland.
  - Robert Jenrick loses the Conservative whip and is sacked as Shadow Secretary of State for Justice over an alleged plan to defect to Reform UK. Jenrick then announces he has joined Reform UK later the same day.
  - 23 councils apply to have the 2026 United Kingdom local elections delayed.
  - Jon Burrows is the only candidate for the Ulster Unionist Party leadership election after deputy leader Robbie Butler announces he will not seek election to the post.
- 17 January
  - Former UK Prime Minister Tony Blair is among a number of high-profile figures to be named by the US Trump administration as members of Gaza's Board of Peace.
  - The Scottish Information Commissioner warns the Scottish Government that it could face legal action after it missed a deadline to release files from an inquiry into whether former first minister Nicola Sturgeon broke the ministerial code during an investigation into her predecessor, Alex Salmond.
- 18 January –
  - Downing Street says that Starmer has told Trump in a phone call that it would be wrong for the United States to impose tariffs on countries for opposing his wish to annex Greenland.
  - Writing in The Sunday Telegraph, Farage says that Reform UK will not become the "Conservative Party 2.0" following the defection of Robert Jenrick.
  - Shadow minister Andrew Rosindell resigns from the Conservative Party to join Reform UK in anger at his former party's handling of the sovereignty of the Chagos Islands when it was in government.
- 20 January – Member of the Senedd and shadow cabinet James Evans is expelled from the Welsh Conservatives after telling leader Darren Millar he is involved in talks to join Reform UK. Reform's leader, Nigel Farage, later says he has held no such talks with Evans.
- 21 January –
  - The Parliamentary Commissioner for Standards rules that Reform UK leader Nigel Farage breached MPs' rules 17 times by failing to register financial interests totalling £384,000 within the 28-day limit, but concludes that the breaches were "inadvertent" and do not require sanctions.
  - Peers vote 251–150 to amend the UK government's Schools Bill to include a social media ban for under 16s.
  - MPs at Westminster vote to amend the Troubles Legacy Act, removing a measure providing conditional immunity from prosecutions for Troubles-era crimes.
- 22 January –
  - Foreign Secretary Yvette Cooper says that the UK is holding off joining Donald Trump's Board of Peace amid concerns about Vladimir Putin's involvement.
  - Labour MP and former Minister Andrew Gwynne announces he is stepping down from his Gorton and Denton constituency, triggering a by-election.
  - Secretary of State for Local Government Steve Reed confirms that 29 councils in England planning elections for May 2026 will have these postponed until May 2027.
  - Chris Watkins is removed as leader of Nuneaton and Bedworth Borough Council following a vote of no confidence over a disagreement about the postponement of local elections. Steve Hey is voted in to replace him.
- 23 January –
  - A BBC News report suggests that with election delays due to local government reorganisation, around 250 councillors could end up serving terms of seven years, rather than the usual four.
  - Belfast City Council's strategic and resources committee votes to suspend its use of X over concerns about the Grok AI tool, with the proposal to be put to the full council on 2 February.
- 24 January –
  - Andy Burnham, the mayor of Greater Manchester and former MP for Leigh, applies to stand as Labour's candidate in the 2026 Gorton and Denton by-election.
  - A Sinn Féin billboard near Newry that bears a pro-Palestine slogan is under investigation by council planners after being erected without permission.
- 25 January – Andy Burnham is blocked by Labour's National Executive Committee from standing as a candidate in the Gorton and Denton by-election.
- 26 January –
  - Former Home Secretary Suella Braverman defects to Reform UK.
  - Former Scottish Conservatives leader Ruth Davidson and former Mayor of the West Midlands Andy Street launch Prosper UK, a centrist organisation that will target an estimated seven million politically homeless voters in a bid to encourage them to vote Conservative.
  - Scottish Conservative councillor for Dunoon ward Daniel Hampsey defects to Reform UK.
- 27 January –
  - Starmer departs for a three-day visit to China, the first time for a UK Prime Minister since 2018.
  - Matt Goodwin is announced as the Reform UK candidate in the Gorton and Denton by-election.
  - Shahbaz Sarwar is announced as the Workers Party of Britain candidate for the Gorton and Denton by-election.
  - Around 50 Labour MPs sign a letter objecting to the decision to block Andy Burnham from standing in the Gorton and Denton by-election.
  - Former MP Conor McGinn is charged with sexual assault.
  - The Rwandan government launches legal action against the UK government to seek payments it says it is owed under the Rwanda asylum plan.
  - The Parliamentary Commissioner for Standards finds that Plaid Cymru MP Liz Saville Roberts breached MPs' rules by failing to register donations worth £47,250 to a cross-party group she chairs within 28 days of receiving the money.
  - The Senedd votes to approve the 2026 Welsh budget, worth £27bn, following a deal between Labour and Plaid Cymru.
- 28 January – Sarah Mullally is installed as the 106th Archbishop of Canterbury in a ceremony at Canterbury Cathedral.
- 30 January –
  - Chinese authorities lift travel bans imposed on seven senior Labour politicians, including Baroness Helena Kennedy, for their criticism of China's human rights against the Uyghur minority.
  - Jackie Pearcey is chosen as the Liberal Democrats candidate for the Gorton and Denton by-election.
  - Hannah Spencer, the Green Party candidate in the 2024 Greater Manchester mayoral election, is chosen as the party's candidate for the Gorton and Denton by-election.
- 31 January –
  - Starmer arrives in Japan following a four-day visit to China, and meets Japanese Prime Minister Sanae Takaichi in Tokyo.
  - Angeliki Stogia is selected as the Labour Party candidate for the Gorton and Denton by-election.
  - 2026 Ulster Unionist Party leadership election: Jon Burrows officially becomes leader of the Ulster Unionist Party.

=== February ===
- 1 February –
  - Peter Mandelson resigns his membership of the Labour Party saying he does not want to "cause further embarrassment" after documents released as part of the Epstein files suggest Jeffrey Epstein paid him $75,000 over three separate payments during 2003 and 2004.
  - Charlotte Cadden, a former police detective, is selected as the Conservative Party candidate for the Gorton and Denton by-election.
  - Speaking to Sky's Sunday Morning with Trevor Phillips, First Minister of Northern Ireland Michelle O'Neill says there should be a referendum for the people of Northern Ireland to decide whether they want to be part of a United Ireland by 2030.
- 2 February –
  - Former minister Tulip Siddiq is sentenced in her absence to four years in prison by a Bangladesh court for charges of corruption.
  - The Workers Party of Britain withdraws from the Gorton and Denton by-election.
  - The Scottish Government says it will not support the Prostitution (Offences and Support) (Scotland) Bill, a bill tabled by Independent MSP Ash Regan that would criminalise payment for sex.
- 3 February
  - Peter Mandelson resigns from the House of Lords following allegations he leaked sensitive information to Jeffrey Epstein.
  - Robert Alden, the leader of Birmingham City Council's Conservative group, writes to Sharon Osbourne inviting her to stand for the party if she moves to the city.
  - MSPs reject the Prostitution (Offences and Support) (Scotland) Bill by 64 votes to 54.
  - The Senedd approves Welsh Government proposals to increase the minimum unit price of alcohol by 30%, from 50p to 65p, from October.
- 4 February – After Labour MPs force a government u-turn over plans to withhold some material relating to Peter Mandelson's appointment as the United Kingdom's ambassador to the United States, MPs approve the amended proposal for the release of government documents .
- 5 February –
  - MSPs back the Non-surgical Procedures and Functions of Medical Reviewers (Scotland) Bill, which would see the introduction of restrictions on cosmetic procedures including botox injections and non-surgical Brazilian butt lifts.
  - Former Conservative Party councillor Dan Thomas is appointed as Leader of Reform UK Wales.
  - It is confirmed that Senedd Member James Evans has joined Reform UK after being expelled from the Conservatives after telling the party he was talking to Reform about defecting.
  - Reform UK win their first council seat in Anglesey, in a local by-election in Ynys Gybi ward, their first gain from Plaid Cymru.
- 6 February –
  - The Liberal Democrats suspend peer Chris Rennard from the party after launching a fresh investigation into allegations he sexually harassed female colleagues.
  - Jo Monk, the leader of the Reform UK-led Worcestershire County Council, warns that the authority faces bankruptcy without financial assistance from central government or a sharp increase in council tax.
- 7 February – The Foreign and Commonwealth Office announces a review into a pay-off given to Peter Mandelson after he was dismissed as the UK's ambassador to the United States.
- 8 February –
  - Morgan McSweeney resigns as Downing Street Chief of Staff over his role in the appointment of Peter Mandelson as the UK's ambassador to the United States.
  - David Taylor, a Worcestershire County Councillor for Redditch East, announces his resignation from Reform UK over the council's plan to increase council tax by 10% from April. Taylor will sit as an independent.
- 9 February –
  - Downing Street Director of Communications, Tim Allan, resigns amid fallout from the Epstein files release.
  - Scottish Labour leader Anas Sarwar calls for Starmer to resign.
  - The UK government says it will spend £5bn paying off 90% of debts built up by local authorities in England covering the cost of children and young people with special educational needs and disabilities.
- 10 February –
  - The Parliamentary Labour Party suspends Matthew Doyle, a former Downing Street Director of Communications, over his links to a convicted sex offender.
  - Bangor University's Debating and Political Society refuses a request for a question and answer session from Reform UK campaigner Jack Anderton and MP Sarah Pochin, citing "zero tolerance for any form of racism, transphobia or homophobia displayed by the members of Reform". The University distances itself from the decision.
  - Scottish Labour removes the party whip from MSP Pam Duncan-Glancy while it investigates her links with a convicted sex offender.
  - The Scottish Government has paid around £400,000 to the campaign group For Women Scotland after it lost a legal case brought by the group over the definition of a woman.
- 11 February –
  - The Liberal Democrats announce they would break up HM Treasury and create a new Department of Growth if they form the next government, with the new department based in Birmingham.
  - Speaking on Sky News, Sir Jim Ratcliffe, co-owner of Manchester United and founder of Ineos, says that the UK has been "colonised by immigrants" and suggests Starmer is "too nice" to do "difficult things" to stabilise the country's economy. Starmer rejects the comments as "offensive and wrong".
  - Reform UK's Francesca O'Brien says the party will not defund Bangor University after the party's Head of Policy, Zia Yusuf, suggested they would remove £30m of funding from the university after its debating society rejected a request for a Q&A session by two Reform politicians.
- 12 February –
  - Sir Chris Wormald announces his resignation as Cabinet Secretary.
  - Two senior parliamentary aides to Welsh Conservatives leader Darren Millar – former deputy chief of staff Zak Weaver and senior communications officer Tomos Llewelyn – defect to Reform UK on the eve of the Welsh Conservative Party conference in Llandudno.
  - Sir Jim Ratcliffe apologises for "offending some people" over his comments on Sky News.
- 13 February –
  - A US Congress hearing into Jeffrey Epstein urges Peter Mandelson to attend to answer questions about his links to the convicted paedophile.
  - It emerges that former Scottish National Party chief executive Peter Murrell is to face charges of embezzling £459,000 from the party over a period of twelve years.
  - Pádraig Delargy, the Sinn Féin MLA for Foyle, confirms he will not be seeking re-election at the next Stormont Assembly election.
  - Former Reform UK MP Rupert Lowe launches a new political party titled Restore Britain.
- 14 February – Starmer addresses the 62nd Munich Security Conference, telling delegates Europe must be ready to fight to protect its people, values and way of life.
- 16 February –
  - The UK government abandons plans to delay local elections in 30 local authorities following legal advice, and ahead of a proposed legal challenge to the delays.
  - An amendment to the Crimes and Policing Bill proposes making hate crimes targeted at members of the LGBTQ community and people with disabilities aggravated offences.
  - Warrington Borough Councillor John Roddy, elected as a Reform UK councillor in an August 2025 by-election, defects to the Conservatives.
- 17 February –
  - Reform UK unveils what Farage describes as its shadow cabinet, with former Conservative ministers Robert Jenrick as financial spokesman and Suella Braverman taking charge of education and skills.
  - Seven ex-Reform councillors on Kent County Council join Rupert Lowe's Restore Britain, and form their own group on the council.
- 18 February – Reform UK shifts its policy on the two child benefit cap, saying that it would now reintroduce the cap if it were elected to government. The party also says it would keep the Office for Budget Responsibility and maintain the independence of the Bank of England.
- 19 February –
  - Starmer appoints Dame Antonia Romeo as the new Cabinet Secretary and Head of the Civil Service, the first woman to hold the post in the role's 110-year history.
  - Warwickshire County Councillors Scott Cameron and Luke Cooper are expelled from the council's Reform UK group amid accusations they were about to defect to Restore Britain.
  - The Democracy and Boundary Commission Cymru approves a 6.4% pay increase for local councillors in Wales, taking their basic annual salary to £21,044.
  - MLA's at Stormont are to receive a £14,200 pay increase from April, taking their annual salaries to £67,200.
  - The UK government refuses to allow military bases in the UK to be used to support potential United States strikes on Iran.
- 20 February – The UK government confirms is considering introducing legislation to remove Andrew Mountbatten-Windsor from the royal line of succession.
- 21 February – Kenny MacAskill, leader of the Alba Party, says the party is unlikely to contest the 2026 Scottish Parliament election because of its "perilous financial situation".
- 22 February – Tommy Sheridan, Angus MacNeil, Christina Hendry and Suzanne Blackley issue a joint statement in which they offer to take over leadership of the Alba Party to ensure it can contest the 2026 Scottish Parliament election.
- 23 February –
  - in a letter to Starmer, Australian Prime Minister Anthony Albanese says that his government would back plans to remove Andrew Mountbatten-Windsor from the royal line of succession.
  - Lord Mandelson is arrested on suspicion of misconduct in public office, following an investigation over allegations he shared market-sensitive government information with Jeffrey Epstein while a government minister.
- 24 February –
  - Parliament backs a motion proposed by the Liberal Democrats to release documents relating to the appointment of Andrew Mountbatten-Windsor as a trade envoy.
  - A spokesman for New Zealand's Prime Minister Christopher Luxon says the New Zealand government backs plans to remove Andrew Mountbatten-Windsor from the royal line of succession.
  - Mandelson says he was arrested following "baseless" information passed to the police that he was about to permanently leave the UK for the British Virgin Islands.
  - Reform UK suspends Adam Mitula, who was helping the party in its campaign in the Gorton and Denton by-election, for making racist and antisemitic comments on social media.
  - MSPs reject the Scottish Parliament (Recall and Removal of Members) Bill, which would have introduced a recall system for MPs suspended from parliament for ten days or longer.
  - The Senedd votes to give its approval to the provision of assisted dying services in Wales.
- 25 February –
  - Sir Lindsay Hoyle confirms he passed on information to the police suggesting Peter Mandelson was a flight risk prior to Mandelson's arrest. The Metropolitan Police subsequently apologises for "inadvertently revealing information" relating to the case.
  - The High Court rules that Gorton and Denton by-election candidate Matt Goodwin and his election agent will not face sanctions for the absence of a "statutory imprint" on leaflets. The judge said the two had taken "appropriate steps to put it right" and that the "error occurred due to a change of font" during the production of the leaflets that "was neither requested nor authorised by the claimants".
  - MSPs vote 66–29 to approve the £68bn 2026 Scottish budget, which includes changes to income tax rates and levies on properties.
  - Former leader of the Scottish Conservatives, Douglas Ross, is banned from Holyrood for a day for questioning the impartiality of the Presiding Officer.
- 26 February –
  - The Green Party wins the Gorton and Denton by-election, their first-ever Westminster by-election win. Hannah Spencer, a 34-year-old plumber, becomes the new MP for the Greater Manchester constituency, with Reform in second place and Labour pushed into third.
  - Allies of Jeremy Corbyn, dubbed "The Many" win 14 of the 21 seats on the central executive committee of Your Party, paving the way for Corbyn to become the party's leader.
- 27 February –
  - Reform UK contacts Greater Manchester Police over reports of "family voting" (where family members enter a polling booth and collude or discuss with or influence others over how to vote) at the Gorton and Denton by-election.
  - A number of Christian groups have expressed their disgust that Reform UK were allowed to use the Assembly Hall of Church House for a press conference in which Nigel Farage announced his frontbench team. The groups say Reform's immigration policy is against Church teachings and beliefs.
- 28 February – Labour MP Josh Simons resigns as Cabinet Office minister, following allegations that his former think tank investigated the background of journalists.

=== March ===
- 1 March –
  - Former Labour Party MP Jonathan Ashworth reveals he is recovering from a stroke he experienced on New Year's Day.
  - The Green Party hits 200,000 members for the first time, after winning the Gorton and Denton by-election. Commenting on the rise, leader Zack Polanski said it 'proves that the future of progressive politics belongs to the Greens'.
- 2 March –
  - Ashley Dalton resigns as a health minister from the UK government as she undergoes chemotherapy for advanced breast cancer.
  - Hannah Spencer is sworn into Parliament following her by-election win.
- 3 March –
  - Chancellor Rachel Reeves delivers the spring statement to the House of Commons.
  - It is reported that West Northamptonshire Councillors Kathryn Shaw and Joanne Blythe have resigned from Reform UK and will sit as independents.
- 4 March –
  - Sally Donald, an SNP candidate in the forthcoming Scottish Parliament election, stands down after it emerges she is being investigated for benefit fraud.
  - Former Labour mayor of Newham Sir Robin Wales and ex-councillor Clive Furness join Reform UK.
- 5 March –
  - Joani Reid voluntarily suspends herself from the Labour Party following her husband's arrest the previous day on suspicion of spying for China.
  - Electoral Commission figures show Reform UK received £5.4m in donations in the final three months of 2025, more than Labour and the Conservatives.
- 6 March –
  - Markus Campbell-Savours, who was suspended from the Labour Party in December for voting against planned changes to inheritance tax for farmers, has the Labour whip restored.
  - Peter Gummer, Baron Chadlington is to resign from the Conservative Party and the House of Lords after an investigation concluded he breached the Lords code of conduct over his role in assisting a subsidiary of a company he chaired to secure contracts to provide personal protective equipment (PPE) during the COVID-19 pandemic, and recommends he is suspended from parliament for a year.
  - Police are investigating death threats against Green Party deputy leader Mothin Ali following claims he attended a pro-Iranian demonstration.
  - Labour's Julie Griffiths wins a by-election for the Murton seat on Durham County Council, taking the seat back from Reform UK, which won it in 2025.
- 8 March – Kenny MacAskill announces that the Alba Party will be wound down due to its "dire financial plight".
- 9 March – Warwickshire County Council's Green Party members have asked for a vote of no confidence in Reform UK's George Finch, the UK's youngest council leader, after accusing him of bringing the authority "into disrepute" and "[abusing] the office of leader". Finch dismisses the attempt as a "political stunt".
- 10 March –
  - The Courts and Tribunals Bill, which would restrict the use of juries in criminal trials, passes its first House of Commons vote, with MPs voting 304–203 in favour.
  - MPs vote to reject a House of Lords proposal for an Australia-style ban on social media for under 16s.
  - Reform Senedd member Laura Anne Jones is criticised for a speech in which she claimed rival parties had "entertained" the idea of children self-identifying as cats.
  - Peers have approved a bill that abolishes the remaining 92 hereditary peerages from the House of Lords.
- 11 March –
  - The Unite union votes to cut its Labour Party affiliation fee by 40%.
  - Andrea Manson resigns as convener of Shetland Islands Council two weeks after being banned as a company director over unpaid tax.
- 12 March –
  - A review finds that Scottish Parliament staff have reported 84 cases of bullying, harassment or sexual harassment since 2021.
  - The pay rise for members of the Stormont Assembly is confirmed.
- 13 March –
  - Starmer holds a summit with Taoiseach Micheál Martin in Cork, where he says the Iran war has increased the importance of good relations between the UK and Ireland.
  - Following Worcestershire County Council's decision to approve a 9% rise in council tax, Farage says he wishes Reform UK "hadn't bothered" to form a minority administration there, because of its financial problems.
- 17 March –
  - Addressing around 60 parliamentarians at Westminster, Ukrainian president Volodymyr Zelenskyy describes the Iranian and Russian regimes as "brothers in hatred" as he warns about the dangers of drone warfare.
  - MSPs vote 69–57 against legalising assisted dying in Scotland.
  - Councillor George Finch survives a vote of no confidence by one vote after Warwickshire County Councillors vote 27–26 against a motion proposed by the Green Party.
  - Unite the Union is fined £265,000 for breaching an injunction during the Birmingham bin strike by "slow walking" in front of waste lorries near depots.
  - Senedd members vote 39–10 to ban greyhound racing in Wales, but the legislation could face a legal challenge after it emerges civil servants warned there was not enough evidence to justify a ban.
  - The Senedd votes to make it illegal to lie during election campaigns, with the legislation expected to become law in 2030.
  - Angela Rayner makes a speech critical of the Labour government.
- 18 March –
  - King Charles hosts the first Nigerian state visit to the UK for 37 years, with President Bola Ahmed Tinubu visiting with his wife Oluremi Tinubu.
  - Volodymyr Zelenskyy visits the UK and speaks at Parliament.
  - Liam McArthur, whose bill to allow assisted dying in Scotland, was defeated in the previous day's Scottish Parliament vote, rules out reintroducing it after the 2026 election.
  - MSPs vote to approve the Prohibition of Greyhound Racing (Scotland) Bill, outlawing greyhound racing in Scotland, 24 hours after the Welsh Senedd passed similar legislation.
  - Councillor Luna Martin, who represents Oban North and Lorn on Argyll and Bute Council, defects from the Scottish Greens and joins the Scottish National Party.
- 19 March –
  - Kemi Badenoch launches the Conservative campaign for the 2026 United Kingdom local elections.
  - Reform UK launch their manifesto for the 2026 Scottish Parliament election. They also unveil their constituency candidates.
  - Former Conservative councillor on Dumfries and Galloway Council John Denerley is suspended for three months after an investigation into behaviour.
  - The House of Lords back an amendment to decriminalise abortion.
  - Nigel Farage is criticised by rival parties for describing Welsh people as "foreign speakers" in one of the videos he produced for Cameo where customers pay a fee for a celebrity to work to the script they supply.
- 20 March –
  - Martin Hewitt announces his resignation as chief of the UK Border Security Command.
  - Nigel Farage stops recording personalised videos on the Cameo platform after a Guardian report he recorded a video for a man convicted of violent disorder at a neo-Nazi rally.
  - Stuart Niven, announced as a Reform UK candidate for Dundee City West for the Scottish Parliament the previous day, is suspended from the party following reports he was disqualified as a company director.
  - The High Court rejects a legal challenge brought by the Greyhound Board of Great Britain over legislation banning greyhound racing in Wales.
- 23 March – Former Conservative Justice Secretary Sir Robert Buckland will lead an independent review into the murder of Sir David Amess.
- 24 March –
  - Ed Davey launches the Liberal Democrat campaign for the local elections at an event in Surrey.
  - Chris Parry, Reform UK's candidate for the 2026 Hampshire and the Solent mayoral election, is suspended by the party for alleged anti-Jewish posts on social media.
  - Malcolm Offord, Reform UK's leader in Scotland, apologises for a joke he made about George Michael at a Burns Night supper in 2018.
  - MSPs pass legislation on the restraint and seclusion of school children in Scotland, requiring the Scottish Government to issue guidelines on the matter.
- 25 March –
  - Starmer announces a ban on cryptocurrency donations to UK political parties following the publication of a review into foreign interference in UK politics.
  - Dame Sarah Mullally is installed as the 106th Archbishop of Canterbury during a ceremony at Canterbury Cathedral.
  - Former Conservative MP and justice minister Crispin Blunt is fined £1,200 by magistrates after pleading guilty to possessing illegal drugs, including cannabis and crystal meth.
  - Reform UK's sole MSP, Graham Simpson, gives his backing to Malcolm Offord following the previous day's reports concerning a joke being allegedly homophobic.
  - Reform UK candidate Andrew Barry withdraws from the 2026 Senedd election and quits the party over party anger about "parachuting" candidates into seats and the number of defections from the Conservatives.
  - Peers vote 266–141 in favour of an amendment to the Children's Wellbeing and Schools Bill that would bring into a law a ban on social media use for under 16s, the second time the amendment has been made to the bill.
- 26 March –
  - Reform UK launches its election campaign for the local elections in England.
  - Following a freedom of information request, BBC Radio 5 Live obtains the 61 letters and emails about conduct and behaviour during prime minister's questions sent by the public to the speaker of the house of commons, Sir Lindsay Hoyle, in January 2026. The "overwhelming majority" of the correspondents complain about Starmer's "failure to answer questions" and Hoyle's "inability to do anything about it".
- 27 March –
  - A police investigation concludes there was "no evidence" of "family voting" or voter coercion during the 2026 Gorton and Denton by-election.
  - Edward Fitzalan-Howard, 18th Duke of Norfolk and Rupert Carington, 7th Baron Carrington will be allowed to keep their peerages when hereditary peers are abolished because of their roles in organising state occasions.
  - Corey Edwards, a leading candidate for Reform UK in the forthcoming Senedd election, withdraws his candidacy after a photograph emerged appearing to show him performing a Nazi salute.
- 29 March –
  - Labour MP Sarah Owen announces she is suspending face-to-face meetings with constituents following three security incidents in the past three weeks.
  - Reform UK candidate Patrick Benham-Crosswell who was standing in Gŵyr Abertawe resigns from the party.
- 30 March –
  - Starmer launches the Labour campaign for the 2026 United Kingdom local elections.
  - The prime minister gives the British Medical Association (BMA) 48 hours to call off their six-day doctor strike after Easter.
  - Eluned Morgan launches the Welsh Labour manifesto for the 2026 Senedd election at an event in Swansea.
  - Rhun ap Iorwerth launches the Plaid Cymru manifesto for the 2026 Senedd election at an event in Bedwas.
  - Former Reform UK Councillor Adam Smith resigns from West Northamptonshire Council.
- 31 March –
  - MP for Kingston upon Hull East Karl Turner is suspended from the Labour Party.
  - Reform UK councillor and Senedd candidate Owain Clatworthy quits the party.
  - Zack Polanski and Anthony Slaughter launch the Wales Green Party manifesto for the 2026 Senedd election.
  - The government announces an overhaul of the rules over non-crime hate incidents.
  - Buckingham Palace confirms the state visit of King Charles III and Queen Camilla to the United States, where they will meet President Donald Trump.
  - The Conservative Party says they will not stand candidates for newly established town councils in Broadstone and Poole.

=== April ===
- 1 April –
  - MPs' basic annual salary will rise by 5% to £98,599.
  - Scottish Labour drops Mohammed Ameen, its candidate for Glasgow Southside, after he was charged with fraud.
  - North Lanarkshire councillor and SNP parliamentary candidate Tracy Carragher is suspended from the party after she was criticised for her handling of complaints about former council leader Jordan Linden, who was convicted of sexually assaulting young men.
- 2 April –
  - Simon Dudley is sacked as Reform UK's housing spokesman following comments made about the Grenfell tower disaster.
  - Plaid Cymru candidate Vivek Thuppil, who described Israel as a "terrorist state" on social media, will remain available for selection in the 2026 Senedd election, the party confirms.
- 3 April – A new national democracy protection unit is offering local police forces help and advice to protect MPs as threats against politicians increase.
- 9 April –
  - Democratic Unionist Party politician Gary Middleton announces he is stepping down from the Northern Ireland Assembly to deal with "significant" mental health challenges.
  - The Green Party of England and Wales launch their local elections campaign.
  - The Green Party win a by-election in Kent, gaining from Reform UK.
- 10 April – Senedd members Rhys ab Owen and Russell George, who were expelled from Plaid Cymru and the Welsh Conservatives respectively, confirm they will run in the 2026 Senedd election as independents.
- 12 April – Reform UK dismisses a row over tax paid by deputy leader Richard Tice's property company as "a minor administrative error".
- 13 April – The Electoral Office for Northern Ireland confirms that Julie Middleton has replaced her husband, Gary, as the MLA for Foyle following his resignation.
- 14 April – The Welsh Liberal Democrats unveil their manifesto for the Senedd election.
- 16 April –
  - The UK government says Starmer did not know that Peter Mandelson had failed the vetting for the role of United Kingdom ambassador to the United States until a few days ago.
  - First Minister of Scotland John Swinney announces that the price of essential foods would be legally capped if the Scottish National Party wins the 2026 Scottish Parliament election.
- 19 April – Former Scottish Labour leader Kezia Dugdale is appointed as chairwoman of Stonewall, and will take up the post in September.
- 20 April –
  - Addressing Parliament, Starmer tells MPs that information regarding Peter Mandelson having failed vetting for the job of UK ambassador to the United States was deliberately withheld from him by Foreign Office officials.
  - Reform UK's Lee Anderson and Your Party's Zarah Sultana are ejected from the House of Commons for accusing Starmer of being a liar over his statement concerning Mandelson's appointment.
  - Education minister Jacqui Smith announces that the UK government is to table an amendment to its Children's Wellbeing and Schools Bill to require schools in England to ban smartphones.
- 21 April –
  - Former senior Foreign Office official Sir Olly Robbins appears before a committee of MPs, where he says Downing Street took a "dismissive attitude" to vetting during Mandelson's appointment as the UK's ambassador to the United States.
  - Starmer confirms that conversations took place regarding a diplomatic role for his former aide Matthew Doyle.
  - The Tobacco and Vapes Bill is cleared by Parliament, meaning that in the UK it will be illegal to sell cigarettes to anyone born after 2008.
- 22 April – Northern Ireland Secretary Hilary Benn announces that the UK government will bring forward a "substantial package of amendments" to its Troubles legacy legislation.
- 23 April –
  - The UK and France agree a new £662m deal to deal with the small boats crisis.
  - US President Donald Trump says that the state visit of King Charles and Queen Camilla to the United States could help repair relations between the UK and the US.
  - Eluned Morgan admits she is at risk at losing her seat in a "knife edge" election.
  - The Environmental Audit Select Committee recommend a ban of forever chemicals in uniforms and frying pans.
  - The Green Party of England and Wales pledges to create "affordable" leases for local businesses, as part of its plan to revive high streets.
- 24 April –
  - The Terminally Ill Adults (End of Life) Bill fails to become law after running out of parliamentary time.
  - Downing Street issues a statement saying that sovereignty of the Falkland Islands "rests with the UK" following reports the United States is to review its support on the issue.
  - Reform Wales leader Dan Thomas distances himself from online comments made by Senedd candidate Martin Roberts that "abuse in nurseries will skyrocket" if parents receive more free childcare.
  - The Northern Ireland Local Government Standards Commissioner suspends Colin Kennedy, a Democratic Unionist Party councillor on Ards and North Down Borough Council, for three months over comments he made during 2023 in which he linked members of the LGBTQ community with Hamas.
- 25 April – Paul Doherty, the deputy lord mayor of Belfast, quits the Social Democratic and Labour Party in a dispute over a council vote on a statue of IRA hunger striker Bobby Sands.
- 26 April –
  - Buckingham Palace says the King's state visit to the United States will go ahead as planned following the White House Correspondents' Dinner shooting.
  - Independent councillor Janet Cleverly, who told a council call handler to "speak English", has been reprimanded following an ombudsman investigation, and must complete extra training.
- 27 April –
  - King Charles and Queen Camilla land in the United States for their four-day state visit.
  - House of Commons Speaker Sir Lindsay Hoyle says he will allow MPs to vote on whether there should be a parliamentary investigation over Starmer's claims about the vetting of Mandelson, which is scheduled to take place the next day.
- 28 April –
  - MPs vote 335–223 against holding a parliamentary investigation into whether Starmer misled parliament over the appointment of Peter Mandelson as UK ambassador to the United States.
  - Morgan McSweeney, Starmer's former chief of staff, tells MPs on the Foreign Affairs Select Committee he made "a serious mistake" in recommending Mandelson's appointment to the position of ambassador.
- 29 April –
  - Peter Dowd, who has served as MP for Bootle since 2015, rejects rumours he is to stand aside in order to allow Andy Burnham to return to Parliament.
  - In an article in The Telegraph, Reform UK leader Nigel Farage reveals he was given a £5m donation by party donor Christopher Harborne in early 2024 to pay for personal protection "so that I would be safe and secure for the rest of my life".
  - Nigel Farage says prominent Reform member Arron Banks should apologise over "poor taste" online comments that sparked accusations of racism after he posted "Welsh Lad?" on X in response to a Plaid Cymru video of a black community organiser from Cardiff.
- 30 April –
  - The Electoral Commission says it is considering whether or not to investigate Nigel Farage's £5m gift from Christopher Harborne.
  - Hereditary peers sit in the House of Lords for the last time as a new law removing them from the chamber takes effect as the first parliamentary session of the Starmer government comes to an end.
  - US President Donald Trump announces that tariffs on whisky will be lifted following the King's visit to the United States.

=== May ===
- 1 May –
  - King Charles III arrives in Bermuda for his first trip to a British Overseas Territory as King.
  - In an interview recorded for BBC Radio 5 Live and Newsnight, former prime minister Sir John Major warns against the frequency at which the UK has changed prime ministers in recent years, and says that some people treat politics like a "game show", while choosing to ignore issues that are left to the next generation to deal with.
  - Green Party leader Zack Polanski apologises for sharing a social media post that criticised police for their handling of the arrest of the Golders Green attack suspect.
  - The Green Party says it will raise the UK minimum wage to £15 an hour should it be elected at the next general election.
  - Restore Britain returns donations from a cryptocurrency project after concerns were raised with the Electoral Commission.
- 2 May –
  - Starmer tells the BBC that he is concerned about the "cumulative" effect of pro-Palestinian marches on the Jewish community, and that in some cases they may need to be stopped.
  - Conservative Party leader Kemi Badenoch apologises after a video opposing reforms to the Legacy Act that featured footage of soldiers on Bloody Sunday was posted to her social media.
  - On the final day of his visit to Bermuda, King Charles III visits a new UK Space Agency observatory and launches a project to track space debris.
  - Wales Green Party leader Anthony Slaughter says he would form a coalition with other parties to stop Reform UK getting into government in Wales.
- 4 May –
  - Starmer attends a meeting of European leaders in Armenia to discuss a £78bn European Union loan to Ukraine.
  - Cardiff Council said it is urgently investigating reports that some people who applied for postal votes have not received the documentation through the post.
- 5 May –
  - Farage says he had no obligation to declare the £5m donation given to him by Christopher Harborne.
  - Reform UK launches an investigation into Phil Tierney, a candidate for Chelmsley Wood in the 2026 Solihull Metropolitan Borough Council election following a social media post in which he said all mosques should be closed.
  - South Ayrshire Council apologises after sending out polling cards in envelopes that incorrectly say photo identification will be needed to vote in the 2026 Scottish Parliament election.
- 6 May
  - The final day of campaigning for the UK local elections, and Wales and Scotland parliament elections.
  - Jordan Linden, the former SNP leader of North Lanarkshire Council, is jailed for 18 months for sexually assaulting five young men.
  - Zack Polanski says he was wrong to say he had been a spokesman for the British Red Cross.
  - More than 1,300 postal vote applicants in Cardiff have not received their ballot papers through the post, it is confirmed.
- 7 May
  - 2026 United Kingdom local elections
  - 2026 Scottish Parliament election
  - 2026 Senedd election
- 8 May
  - Vote counts are completed in England, Wales and Scotland.
  - Reform UK makes big gains from Labour and the Conservatives in the English local elections.
  - Labour suffers an historic defeat in the Welsh Senedd election, taking 9 of the 96 available seats while Plaid Cymru take the most at 43 and Reform UK take 34.
  - Eluned Morgan resigns as First Minister of Wales.
  - Rhun ap Iorwerth is declared elected; meaning he is expected to become First Minister.
  - The Scottish National Party wins the most seats in the Scottish Parliament election for the fifth time.
  - The Liberal Democrats win every seat in the 2026 Richmond upon Thames London Borough Council election, leaving the authority without an official opposition.
- 9 May
  - Starmer appoints Gordon Brown and Harriet Harman as advisers.
  - Labour MP and former minister Catherine West urges cabinet members to challenge Starmer for the Labour Party leadership, saying she will give them a deadline of Monday 11 May to do so, or she will launch a leadership challenge herself.
  - John Swinney declares victory.
  - Sam Ammar, a Bromsgrove councillor, is suspended from the Liberal Democrats over claims she made antisemitic comments on social media.
  - Kamel Hawwash, a newly elected Green Party councillor in Birmingham, is reported to have described the 7 October 2023 attacks as "courage in the face of aggression".
  - Atikur Rahman, a newly elected Green Party councillor in Birmingham, is reported to have shared anti-Israel conspiracy theories on social media that Israel was "attacking the UK" by funding the 2024 summer riots and the far-right activist Tommy Robinson.
  - Saiqa Ali, a newly elected Green Party councillor in south London, is reported to have been arrested on suspicion of stirring up racial hatred.
  - Ifhat Shaheen, a newly elected Green Party councillor in Stoke Newington, is reported to have reposted a tweet saying (after the 2026 Golders Green attack) "Since Golders Green is now in the news, I want to take the opportunity to make people aware that the Jewish community in North London hosts IDF soldiers in their synagogues and raise funds for the IDF".
  - The Home Office recorded more than 200,000 migrants have crossed the English Channel in small boats since records began in 2018.
- 10 May
  - Angela Rayner claims that Labour faces its "last chance" after heavy election losses and supports Andy Burnham to return to Westminster.
  - Anas Sarwar says he will stay on as leader of Scottish Labour.
  - Glenn Gibbins, a newly elected Reform UK councillor in Sunderland becomes under investigation by the party following allegations of racism.
  - Reform UK appoints the first woman to its cabinet at Lancashire County Council by giving Ella Worthington the portfolio for civic pride, an office that had not previously existed at the council.
  - Gillian Mackay, co-leader of the Scottish Greens tells BBC Scotland's The Sunday Show she is confident MSP Q Manivannan, who is in the UK on a student visa, will be able to renew their visa when required.
  - Plaid Cymru leader Rhun ap Iorwerth will become Wales's next First Minister within days after the other parties in the Senedd indicated they will either back him or not oppose him.
- 11 May
  - Angela Rayner delivers a speech at the Communication Workers Union conference in Bournemouth during which she attacks the prime minister for blocking Andy Burnham's return, says that Labour must deliver and that words are not enough.
  - Catherine West backs down from launching a leadership challenge against Starmer, but urges him to set a timetable for his departure.
  - Stuart Prior, a newly-elected Reform UK councillor in Essex resigns and is expelled from the party after creating racist and Islamophobic posts on social media.
- 12 May
  - 2026 Labour Party leadership crisis
    - Jess Phillips resigns as a government minister.
    - Alex Davies-Jones resigns as a government minister.
  - The Green Party admits that Zack Polanski has, until recently, been living on a houseboat in London and may have failed to pay council tax.
  - Ben Rowe, a newly-elected Reform UK councillor on Plymouth City Council is suspended from the party after Islamophobic posts on social media.
  - Jay Cooper, a newly elected Reform UK councillor in Sefton, resigns after revelations that he said the Holocaust was a hoax.
  - Starmer speaks to Scotland's first minister, John Swinney, to congratulate him on his election win, and agrees to discuss the constitution with Swinney.
  - Rhun ap Iorwerth is sworn in as First Minister of Wales. Becoming the first, First Minister to come from a party other than Welsh Labour.
- 13 May
  - The 2026 State Opening of Parliament takes place.
  - The Parliamentary Commissioner for Standards launches an inquiry into whether Reform UK leader Nigel Farage broke Commons rules.
  - Prince Edward, Duke of Edinburgh joins MSPs for the traditional Kirking of the parliament at Edinburgh's St Giles' Cathedral.
  - The Ap Iorwerth government is formed with new ministers appointed to the Welsh Cabinet.
  - Former MS Caroline Jones is reported to be receiving palliative care after being diagnosed with severe sepsis.
  - Nathaniel Menday, a newly-elected Reform UK councillor on Sheffield City Council is suspended from the party after the emergence of deleted social media posts in which he described the UK as having a "subhuman underclass".
  - Reform UK suspends Sunderland councillor Glenn Gibbins for a social media post in which he suggested the city's Nigerian population should be melted down to "fill in potholes".
  - The All Party Parliamentary Group on beauty calls for a ban on advertising sunbeds and warnings about the dangers of skin cancer.
- 14 May –
  - Wes Streeting resigns as Secretary of State for Health and Social Care.
  - Josh Simons resigns as MP for Makerfield triggering a by-election that could pave the way for Andy Burnham to return to Parliament.
  - Angela Rayner says she has settled her tax bill with HMRC.
  - Reform UK loses control of Worcestershire County Council; the Conservative Party suspends its group leader after he struck a deal with the Green Party and others to oust the minority administration.
  - MSPs are sworn in for the 7th Scottish Parliament, and Cunninghame North MSP Kenneth Gibson is elected as Presiding Officer.
  - Just days after standing in the Senedd election, Caroline Jones succumbs to sepsis after being taken to hospital the day before.
  - The Welsh Government says that Starmer has spoken to First Minister Rhun ap Iorwerth, and said he is open to giving the Senedd more law-making powers.
- 15 May –
  - Labour's National Executive Committee clears Andy Burnham to seek selection as the party's candidate for the Makerfield by-election.
  - Conservative Party leader Kemi Badenoch says she is delighted after rapper Nicki Minaj compared her to Margaret Thatcher.
- 18 May –
  - In a speech, Mayor of Greater Manchester Andy Burnham says that Brexit has been "damaging" to the UK, but that he would not re-run the Brexit argument because "Britain will be stuck in a permanent rut if we're just constantly arguing".
  - The UK government is to transfer funding for some youth justice initiatives in Wales to the Welsh Government from April 2027.
  - King Charles III accepts an invitation to make a state visit to Ireland from Irish President Catherine Connolly during a meeting at Buckingham Palace.
- 19 May –
  - 2026 Makerfield by-election:
    - Labour confirms Andy Burnham as its candidate for the Makerfield by-election.
    - Reform announces Robert Kenyon as its candidate for Makerfield.
  - MSPs vote to re-appoint John Swinney as Scotland's first minister.
  - First Minister of Wales Rhun ap Iorwerth confirms he raised the topic of Welsh independence during a call with Starmer.
- 20 May –
  - James Roscoe, the UK's deputy ambassador to the United States, abruptly resigns from his post.
  - John Swinney unveils his new eight-person cabinet.
  - George Finch, leader of Warwickshire County Council, is elected leader of Nuneaton and Bedworth Borough Council.
  - Derby City Council holds its annual Mayor Making Ceremony, with the outgoing mayor choosing an instrumental version of the 1999 Dr. Dre track "Still D.R.E." as one of the pieces of music played at the event. This leads to criticism from other councillors over the choice of music.
  - A meeting of Kirklees Council ends without electing a leader after Sarah Wood, leader of the council's Reform group, says her members do not understand the rules. After a video of the meeting goes viral, attracting some derision, Wood says that her members have received the appropriate training.
- 21 May –
  - Starmer says he will campaign for Andy Burnham in Makerfield.
  - Chris Kennedy is selected as the Green Party candidate for the Makerfield by-election, but is forced to withdraw from the election several hours later following the emergence of social media posts in which he described an attack on ambulances belonging to a Jewish charity as a "false flag".
  - Kenneth Gibson, the new Presiding Officer of the Scottish Parliament, announces that First Minister's Questions will increase from one to two sessions a week, with a second 30-minute session occurring on a Tuesday in addition to the Thursday session.
- 22 May –
  - Carla Denyer takes a leave of absence due to occupational burnout.
  - Andy Burnham says net migration needs to fall further.
  - Gavin Williamsons pet tarantula dies.
  - The Liberal Democrats announce Jake Austin as their candidate for the 2026 Makerfield by-election.
  - It is announced that the attorney general will review the sentencing of three teenage boys who raped two girls in separate attacks in Fordingbridge.
  - Jamie Hanlon, who represents Penwithick and Boscoppa on Cornwall Council, leaves Reform UK.
  - It is reported that Nigel Farage was issued with a court judgement for a £9,400 debt.
  - Lincolnshire councillor Trevor Bridgwood quits Reform UK.
- 23 May –
  - It is reported that Emma Beck, a Reform UK councillor in St Helens was convicted of assault.
  - Starmer calls on TNT Sports to make the Champions League final between Arsenal and Paris St-Germain free-to-air.
- 25 May – Former SNP chief executive Peter Murrell pleads guilty to embezzling more than £400,000 from the party and is remanded in custody to await sentence.
- 26 May –
  - Former Prime Minister Sir Tony Blair publishes a 5,600 word essay in which he argues the Labour government has "no coherent plan" for the UK, and has introduced policies that have held back business.
  - Sarah Wakefield is announced as the Green Party candidate for the Makerfield by-election.
  - MSPs endorse a Scottish Government call for the UK government to hold a Second Scottish independence referendum after the policy receives backing from the SNP and the Greens.
  - First Minister of Wales Rhun ap Iorwerth confirms there will be no Wales-wide ban on mobile phones in schools.
  - Corey Edwards, a Senedd candidate who stood down after appearing to perform a Nazi salute, is taken on as an adviser by Reform Wales leader Dan Thomas.
- 28 May – First Minister of Scotland John Swinney rejects calls for a Scottish Parliament inquiry into former SNP chief executive Peter Murrell.
- 30 May Labour councillor Sue Riley resigns from Monmouthshire County Council.
- 31 May – Doug Beattie announces his resignation from the Ulster Unionist Party, of which he is a former leader, saying his position within the party is no longer "tenable", and amid the prospect that he could be deselected from his Upper Bann constituency.

=== June ===
- 3 June – Robert Kenyon, Reform UK's candidate for the Makerfield by-election, admits to making "crass" comments online after revelations regarding his past social media activity.
- 4 June –
  - Lowestoft MP Jess Asato is suing Elon Musk's SpaceXAI, saying in a statement that the Grok AI platform was used to create fake sexualised images of her.
  - During an edition of the BBC's Question Time, Andy Burnham confirms that he would seek to enter any future Labour Party leadership election if elected to Parliament.
- 7 June –
  - Ukrainian president Volodymyr Zelenskyy arrives in the UK for talks with top European allies at Downing Street.
  - Deputy Prime Minister David Lammy says he has spoken to US Vice President JD Vance to say his comments regarding the murder of Henry Nowak were "wrong".
  - Wales's Health Minister Mabon ap Gwynfor says the NHS in Wales is not fundamentally broken and can live within its means, and that he will look at using money and resources differently to reduce costs.
- 8 June – Staffordshire County Councillor Charlotte Kelly defects from Reform UK to the Conservatives, citing bullying and sexism within her former party.
- 9 June –
  - Reform UK leader Nigel Farage says he has contacted X about a series of fake adverts depicting him fighting with Bank of England Governor Andrew Bailey.
  - A number of trade unions have distanced themselves from an invitation issued by Nigel Farage for them to affiliate themselves with Reform UK rather than Labour.
- 10 June – The Scottish Parliament rejects a call for an inquiry into former SNP chief executive Peter Murrell in favour of a wider inquiry into the financing of political parties.
- 11 June –
  - John Healey resigns as Secretary of State for Defence over the government's defence spending plans, warning that the proposed settlement would reduce the readiness of the British Armed Forces and could make the country less safe.
  - Dan Jarvis is appointed to replace John Healey as Defence Secretary.
  - Al Carns resigns as Armed Forces Minister.
- 12 June –
  - Starmer tells the BBC it is his "duty" to stay on as prime minister, saying he has made "hard-edged" choices, including getting every department to make cuts in order to pay for defence.
  - A French government agency alleges that social media accounts linked to an Israeli firm targeted John Swinney by spreading disinformation online before the 2026 Scottish Parliament election.
- 14 June – Labour MP Lauren Edwards announces she will make a fresh attempt to legalise assisted dying in England and Wales by introducing an identical bill to the one that ran out of time before the end of the current parliament's first session.
- 15 June – Medway councillor Robbie Lammas, who defected from the Conservatives to Reform, leaves the party, describing his decision to join Reform as the "biggest mistake of my life".
- 16 June – Plaid Cymru accuses Reform politician Joe Martin of inflammatory and dangerous rhetoric after he claimed attacks from Sudanese asylum seekers were "inevitable".
- 17 June – Senedd members from Plaid Cymru, Labour and the Greens walk out as Reform's Joe Martin gives a speech in which he said that Welsh students are unable to read, and that Indian nurses are taking Welsh jobs.
- 18 June –
  - Three By-elections take place in Makerfield, Aberdeen South and Arbroath and Broughty Ferry after the sitting MPs, Josh Simons, Stephen Flynn and Stephen Gethins, Simons resigned to get Andy Burnham into parliament, and Flynn and Gethins were elected to the Scottish Parliament in May.
  - Liberal Democrat MP Cameron Thomas has had the party whip withdrawn pending the outcome of a police investigation, a party spokesperson announces.
  - Scottish Parliament officials announce that journalists will be restricted to a designated area when speaking to politicians after First Minister's Questions.
  - The Welsh Government expresses its disappointment that a planned meeting between First Minister Rhun ap Iorwerth and Prime Minister Keir Starmer, scheduled for June, will not take place.
- 19 June –
  - 2026 Makerfield by-election: Andy Burnham of the Labour and Co-operative Party wins the Makerfield by-election, defeating Reform UK candidate Rob Kenyon by 9,231 votes. The result returns Burnham to the House of Commons and clears the way for a possible challenge to Starmer's leadership of the Labour Party.
  - Douglas Lumsden wins the Aberdeen South by-election for the Scottish Conservatives, the party's first by-election win since 1973, with the SNP falling to second place. James Adams will succeed him as MSP.
  - Lara Bird wins the Arbroath and Broughty Ferry by-election for the SNP, retaining the seat for the party.
  - The Conservative Party win two seats from Reform in council by-elections in Essex.
  - John Edwards resigns as the UK's information commissioner following a workplace investigation into allegations of inappropriate humour.
  - Ruth Charteris KC is sworn in as Lord Advocate, while B. J. Gill KC is sworn in as Solicitor-General of Scotland.
- 22 June
  - Starmer announces his pending resignation as prime minister and Labour Party leader following the return of Andy Burnham to parliament in the 2026 Makerfield by-election, prompting a leadership election.
  - Andy Burnham is sworn in as Makerfield's new MP.
  - Former Democratic Unionist Party leader Jeffrey Donaldson is found guilty at Newry Crown Court of 18 historic child sexual offences, including one count of rape, 13 counts of indecent assault and four counts of gross indecency, against two complainants between 1985 and 2008. Judge Paul Ramsey says Donaldson will receive a lengthy prison sentence at a later date.
- 23 June –
  - Peter Murrell, former chief executive of the Scottish National Party, is sentenced to five years and three months in prison after pleading guilty to eight charges of embezzling a total of £459,000 between 2010 and 2023.
  - Labour names Bev Craig, the leader of Manchester City Council, as its candidate for the 2026 Greater Manchester mayoral by-election.
  - Farage says "it's not the public's business" to know how he spends a £5m gift from a Reform UK donor.
- 24 June –
  - Starmer holds talks with Andy Burnham on a leadership transition.
  - Darren Jones announces he will not challenge Andy Burnham for the leadership of the Labour Party.
  - Following his conviction for historical child sex offences, Jeffrey Donaldson asks for his knighthood to be forfeited, and tenders his resignation from the Privy Council with immediate effect.
  - The Welsh Government announces plans for automatic voter registration in time for the 2027 local elections.
  - A code of conduct hearing clears George Finch, the leader of Warwickshire County Council, of any wrongdoing over comments he made on social media about a rape case involving an asylum seeker.
- 25 June – Chancellor Rachel Reeves gives her backing to Andy Burnham as the next Labour leader, but urges him to continue with her economic plan "because it is beginning to bear fruit".
- 26 June –
  - The Green Party is forced to return a £1,500 donation made by its leader, Zack Polanski, because it was considered to be impermissible.
  - The Democratic Unionist Party says it is commissioning an independent review into a "number of issues arising following the conviction of Jeffrey Donaldson".
- 27 June – King Charles III opens the seventh session of the Scottish Parliament, urging MSPs to help build a "fair and prosperous society".
- 28 June –
  - Phil Eckersley is chosen as the Conservative candidate for the 2026 Greater Manchester mayoral by-election.
  - The Liberal Democrats are facing a call for an independent investigation into their deselection of BBC journalist David Campanale as a candidate before the 2024 general election on the basis of his religion.
- 29 June –
  - In his first speech since launching his bid to become Labour Party leader, Andy Burnham says he will redistribute power across the UK and establish a Downing Street team in Manchester dubbed "Number 10 North".
  - Former Conservative MP Craig Williams pleads guilty to cheating at gambling after placing bets on the outcome of the 2024 general election.
  - Sian Astley is announced as the Reform UK candidate for the 2026 Greater Manchester mayoral by-election.
- 30 June –
  - BBC News reports that Andy Burnham plans to spend some of the working week based in Manchester if he becomes prime minister.
  - Nigel Farage has declared earnings of £270,000 for work advertising gold bullion of about four hours per month over three months, his largest single payment since becoming an MP.
  - A Progress Pride flag is removed from the headquarters of Huntingdonshire District Council after a Reform UK objection revealed it should have been granted planning permission.

=== July ===
- 1 July –
  - Claire Ward, the mayor of the East Midlands, criticises UK government proposals to scrap two major road projects in the region as part of cuts planned to help pay for increases in defence spending.
  - A Reform Wales proposal to scrap the Welsh Government's Nation of Sanctuary policy for asylum seekers is defeated in a Senedd vote 38–52.
- 2 July –
  - Andy Burnham meets trade union leaders ahead of his expected premiership.
  - Former Downing Street Chief of Staff Morgan McSweeney says that Labour did not prepare for government before winning the 2024 general election.
  - Culture Secretary Lisa Nandy announces she and her department are leaving X because it "isn't healthy for our democracy or are communities".
- 3 July –
  - Andy Burnham rules out calling a snap general election if he becomes prime minister.
  - Hollie Ridley announces that she will stand down as General Secretary of the Labour Party following the Labour Party Conference in the autumn.
  - Nigel Farage hires Miles Goslett as Reform UK's new chief of communications.
- 5 July –
  - Robert Jenrick says that no rules were broken after The Sunday Times reports that Reform UK leader, Nigel Farage, did not declare what he said was a personal gift given to him before he became an MP, by an old friend once convicted of fraud in the United States.
  - Green Party leader Zack Polanski confirms he will pay any outstanding council tax he owes, having believed he was not liable for it while living on a houseboat in London.
  - Police are making inquiries after a complaint concerning the finances of Yes Scotland.
- 6 July – Four councillors who voted to allow a rapist taxi driver to keep his operator's licence have resigned from Highland Council's licensing committee.
- 7 July – Nigel Farage announces his intention to resign as MP for Clacton, triggering a by-election in which he intends to stand.
- 9 July –
  - 2026 Labour Party leadership election: Nominations open for the Labour Party leadership election, with Andy Burnham the only declared candidate, and receiving 322 nominations.
  - Andy Burnham issues an apology for Labour's initial response to the Gaza war.
  - Rupert Lowe, the leader of Restore Britain, faces criticism after describing the Dunblane massacre as "one murder" during his appearance on a podcast to criticise UK gun laws.
  - Parliament officially triggers a by-election in Clacton, with a provisional date of Thursday 13 August.
  - Former Conservative MP and current Reform UK spokeswoman Ann Widdecombe is found dead at her home, police launch a murder investigation.
  - A statue of Rhodri Morgan is unveiled in Cardiff Bay.
- 10 July –
  - The date of the Clacton by-election is confirmed as 13 August.
  - Police are reported to be investigating at least £500,000-worth of donations made to Reform UK by the mother of convicted fraudster George Cottrell.
- 11 July – Devon and Cornwall Police believe Ann Widdecombe was attacked around 24 hours before her body was discovered. The force says enquiries are "moving at pace for a suspect who is believed to be a white male", while a 26-year-old man arrested the previous day is released and is no longer regarded as a suspect. A 28-year-old man is subsequently arrested in South Yorkshire.
- 12 July – Devon and Cornwall Police say there is no suggestion of a political motive to the death of Ann Widdecombe.
- 13 July –
  - Counter terrorism police take over the Ann Widdecombe murder investigation.
  - Andy Burnham has secured nominations from 349 of Labour's 403 MPs, effectively guaranteeing he will be the next prime minister.
  - Hannah Spencer introduces the Maximum Workplace Temperature Bill, aiming to set up an independent body to enforce maximum temperatures for workplaces.
- 14 July – The House of Commons unanimously approves the Public Office (Accountability) Bill, known as the Hillsborough Law, which would impose a statutory duty of candour on public officials and require them to tell the truth during investigations into public tragedies. The bill proceeds to the House of Lords.
- 15 July –
  - Keir Starmer takes his last ever Prime Minister's Questions in the Commons, telling MPs "this is the end of my political journey".
  - A man is arrested over social media posts threatening to shoot Nigel Farage.
  - 2026 Welsh Labour leadership election: Ken Skates officially becomes permanent leader of Welsh Labour unopposed; he was previously appointed interim leader on 9 May.
  - First Minister of Wales Rhun ap Iorwerth promises an "even more cooperative" approach to working with opposition parties in the Senedd after the Welsh Government's budget was defeated.
- 16 July –
  - Keir Starmer visits Ukraine, his final overseas visit as prime minister.
  - Downing Street announces the creation of 26 new life peers, including Mayor of London Sadiq Khan, television presenter June Sarpong and former judge Sir Brian Leveson.
  - UK government plans are published to abolish two-tier councils in 14 local authority areas, and replace them with unitary authorities.
  - An employee of the University of Aberdeen is arrested and charged over social media posts relating to the death of Ann Widdecombe.
  - UK government proposals to stop paying coastguard volunteers for callout time are abandoned after some threatened to quit the service over the plans.
  - 2026 Norfolk Police and Crime Commissioner by-election is held.
  - Nominations for leader of the Labour party close in the leadership contest.
  - BBC News reports that Andy Burnham will go on a summer tour across the UK during the early weeks of his premiership.
- 17 July
  - 2026 Labour Party leadership election: Andy Burnham is formally declared leader of the Labour Party after standing unopposed. In his first speech as leader, he pledges to restore hope and transfer power from Westminster and Whitehall to local communities. He is expected to succeed Keir Starmer as prime minister on 20 July.
  - A total of 34 candidates are confirmed as standing in the Clacton by-election, including multiple candidates from the Official Monster Raving Loony Party.
  - Conservative MP Patrick Spencer is cleared of two counts of sexual assault after a jury finds him not guilty.
  - 2026 Norfolk Police and Crime Commissioner by-election: Former police detective Colin Sutton is elected as Reform UK's first police and crime commissioner.
  - China criticises the nationalisation of British Steel.
  - Ashley Baxter, the leader of South Kesteven District Council, announces he is considering a legal challenge against plans to reorganise local government in Lincolnshire.
  - Police are reported to be investigating an alleged death threat against Reform UK MS Cai Parry-Jones and his family.
  - Lawyers representing former DUP leader Jeffrey Donaldson lodge an appeal against his conviction for historic child abuse.
- 18 July –
  - Andy Burnham announces he will scrap plans to introduce digital ID cards in the UK in order to tackle cost of living problems when he becomes prime minister in order.
  - The Liberal Democrats urge the Football Association and UEFA to withdraw from FIFA after accusing FIFA of "destroying the integrity of the beautiful game".
- 19 July – Lucy Powell says the new government will stay with the 2024 manifesto.
- 20 July –
  - Premiership of Andy Burnham:
    - Andy Burnham becomes prime minister.
    - Burnham appoints John Healey as Chancellor of the Exchequer.
    - Ed Miliband is appointed as Foreign Secretary.
    - Louise Haigh is appointed Cabinet Office Minister.
    - Burnham announces that Douglas Alexander will remain in the role of Secretary of State for Scotland.
    - Jo Stevens confirms she will leave the role of Secretary of State for Wales after Andy Burnham becomes prime minister.
    - It is confirmed that Hilary Benn will leave his role as Secretary of State for Northern Ireland.
    - James Timpson resigns as Minister of State for Prisons, Probation and Reducing Reoffending.
    - Darren Jones is dismissed as chief secretary to the prime minister.
    - A 28-year-old man is charged with Ann Widdecombe's murder.
- 21 July –
  - The Burnham cabinet have their first cabinet meeting.
  - The UK government announces that VAT on domestic electricity bills will be abolished on 1 October, saving a typical household less than £1 per week on their bills. The government say it will be funded using the £1.8 million saved by scrapping the previously announced digital ID programme. Labour's Darren Jones, who was sacked as chief secretary to the prime minister on 20 July, says the tax cut is unfunded.
  - The Department for Science, Innovation and Technology is abolished.
  - BBC News reports that civil servants working for government departments based in London have been offered relocation packages to encourage them to move to the North of England.
  - Stephen Kinnock is appointed as Secretary of State for Wales.
  - Sir Chris Bryant is appointed as Secretary of State for Northern Ireland.
  - A suspect is remanded in custody at the Old Bailey charged with the murder of Ann Widdecombe. A provisional trial date is set for 8 June 2027.
  - Former Carmarthen MP Gwynoro Jones is found not guilt of sexual assault.
  - An attempt by the minority Reform UK administration to reverse a declaration of a climate emergency by Warwickshire County Council is thwarted by the Conservatives.
- 22 July –
  - Natalie Fleet resigns as Parliamentary Under-Secretary of State for Safeguarding and Violence Against Women and Girls.
  - Sinn Féin MLA Gerry Kelly announces he will not contest the next Stormont election.
  - Anas Sarwar resigns as Scottish Labour leader following his appointment to the Burnham ministry and elevation to the House of Lords.
  - Al Carns refuses to take a ministerial role.
  - Lewisham Council becomes the first in the UK to vote to refuse to assist the Home Office with immigration raids wherever possible.
- 23 July –
  - Burnham meets the respective First Ministers of Scotland and Wales, John Swinney and Rhun ap Iorwerth, in Glasgow ahead of the 2026 Commonwealth Games opening ceremony. 10 Downing Street later confirms that the prospect of a second Scottish independence referendum was "off limits".
  - The application of former Conservative Party MP, party chairman, and cabinet minister, Grant Shapps, to stand again for the Conservatives at the next general election, is declined by the party.
  - Angela Rayner says she will not repay a £16,876 ministerial severance payment returning to the cabinet.
  - Patriotic Millionaires, a group of 120 wealthy people, including Gary Lineker and Brian Eno, send an openn letter to Burnham asking for an increase in taxes for wealthy people.
  - Jeffrey Donaldson has his knighthood removed.
  - West Yorkshire Police and Wakefield Council launch an investigation after claims Reform UK councillors attempted to have a music event shut down due to posters featuring the face of Nigel Farage.
- 24 July – Launch of Andy Burnham's Number 10 North in Manchester.
- 25 July – BBC News reports that the Metropolitan Police is investigating four donations totalling £1 million made to Reform UK before the 2024 United Kingdom general election, including two payments from major party donor Fiona Cottrell and two from Britain Means Business, a company owned and controlled by Reform deputy leader Richard Tice. Cottrell had transferred £1 million to the company shortly before it donated £500,000 to the party.
- 26 July –
  - In a BBC interview, Andy Burnham rules out calling an early general election.
  - Monica Lennon announces she will stand in the 2026 Scottish Labour leadership election.
- 27 July –
  - Burnham hosts Ukrainian president Volodymyr Zelenskyy and expresses the UK's "unwavering support" for Ukraine.
  - Reform UK report Green Party leader Zack Polanski to the police after he shared an Instagram post including a photo of a man wearing a top featuring the name "Nigel" alongside an image of a guillotine.
  - Michael Marra announces he will stand in the Scottish Labour leadership election.
- 28 July –
  - Bridget Phillipson is appointed as Chair of the Labour Party.
  - Joe Fagan announces he will stand as a candidate in the Scottish Labour leadership election.
- 29 July – The Metropolitan Police says it will take no further action against Zack Polanski over his sharing of a post depicting a man in a t-shirt showing a guillotine and referencing the name Nigel.
- 30 July –
  - Polls open for the 2026 Greater Manchester mayoral by-election.
  - Andy Burnham criticises virtual job interviews for negatively affecting young people.
  - Burnham announces plans to give regional mayors a share of income tax revenue as part of his drive to devolve power from Westminster.
  - The Supreme Court of the United Kingdom announces they will review the ban of palestine action.
  - The Labour whip is restored to MPs Diane Abbott and Joani Reid.
  - The Green Party is reported to be reviewing its social media policy following controversy over a post shared by Zack Polanski.
  - Michael Fife Cook, the leader of Devon County Council's Reform UK group, is told to apologise to council officers and undergo training after raising concerns about "the sexualisation of children" in an email following a controversial LGBTQ event at Exeter Library.
  - Reform-controlled South Tyneside Council votes 35-11 to scrap the local authority's 2019 Green Party declaration of a climate emergency. The opposition was from rival councillors.
- 31 July –
  - Chancellor John Healey announces 28 October as the date of his first budget.
  - Bev Craig is elected as Mayor of Greater Manchester, retaining the seat for Labour.
  - Several trade unions announce they will boycott the 2026 Labour Women's Conference because of a ban on transgender women taking part.
  - Concerns are raised about the level of debt accrued by Northumberland County Council, which stood at £898.4m at the start of the 2026–27 financial year.

=== August ===
- 3 August –
  - Bev Craig assumes office as Mayor of Greater Manchester, succeeding Andy Burnham.
  - Richard Tice, the deputy leader of Reform UK, is investigated by a parliamentary watchdog over a possible failure to declare an interest. Tice says the investigation is related to a debate on UK democracy and Israeli influence, following a complaint from an "anti-Israel" lobby group.
- 4 August – Green councillor Andy Davies resigns from Sheffield City Council.
- 5 August –
  - Ed Miliband meets Marco Rubio in Washington.
  - Number 10 says they are not "actively considering" an inquiry into the UK activities of Jeffrey Epstein.
  - Joshua Bonehill-Paine, a former neo-Nazi who was selected as a Conservative Party council candidate, says he will not contest an election for them following controversy over his selection. He will instead advise the party on how to tackle political extremism.
  - The Scottish Government announces 5 million pounds to help businesses affected by a major fire at Princes Street.
- 6 August – Rhys Carr, a councillor for Ackworth, North Elmsall and Upton, elected to represent Reform UK in the 2026 Wakefield Metropolitan District Council election, defects to the Social Democratic Party (SDP).
- 7 August –
  - Defence Secretary Wes Streeting responds to reports of rape and sexual abuse of young female recruits at the Army Foundation College (AFC) in Harrogate, saying he will be "looking in detail specifically at what's gone wrong at Harrogate, but also looking more broadly at how we lead a programme of culture change across our armed forces and across defence.".
  - Counter-terrorism police investigating the killing of Ann Widdecombe reopen inquiries into an attempted burglary that occurred at Nigel Farage’s London address in April 2025.
- 8 August – It is reported that Nigel Farage and Richard Tice are to sue the National Crime Agency over alleged leaks of confidential information.
- 10 August – Scottish Greens MSP Q Manivannan issues an apology following controversy over comments made about the "demonisation" of rape.
- 12 August –
  - Andy Burnham calls for retailers to stop selling disposal barbeques.
  - The funeral of Ann Widdecombe is held at Buckfast Abbey.
  - Siobhan Harper-Nunes, a Green Party member of Birmingham City Council is charged with attacking a member of the public, three police officers and a member of police staff.
  - The Democratic Unionist Party accuses Sinn Féin of trying to "avoid responsibility for its own failures" after former MP Francie Molloy suggested delays to the A5 upgrade could be linked to landowner opposition rooted in the Plantation of Ulster.
  - Estonian Justice Minister Liisa Pakosta rejects the idea of taking British prisoners.
  - A South Tyneside councillor 'voluntarily resigns' from Reform UK.
- 13 August –
  - 2026 Clacton by-election is held.
  - Dave Rowan, a Reform UK councillor in Kirklees Council is suspended for controversial social media posts about John Bercow.
  - Green Party councillor Laurie Needham resigns from Charnwood Borough Council.
  - Rhun ap Iorwerth calls for retailers to stop selling disposal barbeques.
- 14 August –
  - 2026 United Kingdom heatwaves: Judith Blake is appointed as fire minister amid damaging wildfires, serving in the Ministry of Housing, Communities and Local Government.
  - 2026 Clacton by-election:
    - Nigel Farage is re-elected as Clacton's MP with 22,239 votes; Count Binface receives 9,455 votes and a 26.9% share, reported as the highest ever for a novelty candidate.
    - The parliamentary investigation into Farage's £5m donation is reopened following his election win.
  - The former Labour leader of Melton Borough Council is charged with sexual assault.
- 16 August – in a Sunday Times article, Reform UK treasury spokesman Robert Jenrick announces the party would aim to make £50bn of welfare cuts if in government. Proposals include replacing the Personal Independence Payment and the Universal Credit health element with a system that would continue to pay "severe, enduring and high-risk cases", with the others being supported by councils on a "verifiable additional costs" as a result of their disability basis. The party also plans to introduce a cost-neutral scheme requiring employers to continue to pay employees who are signed off as sick for up to two years by using insurance cover funded from a reduction in employer National Insurance contributions. Modelled on the Dutch system, Reform UK say employers would be incentivised to find ways to encourage people back to work to reduce their insurance premiums. Labour describes the plans as "fantasy economics" while the Conservatives say they are "half-baked".
- 17 August –
  - The Politico website reports that Prime Minister Andy Burnham exchanged messages with a person posing as Susie Wiles, the chief of staff to US President Donald Trump.
  - Labour MP Bayo Alaba is suspended from the Parliamentary Labour Party following a newspaper report questioning whether he repaid a Covid loan.
  - Reform UK announces more proposals related to their plans to cut welfare spending by £50 billion. Additional proposals include requiring long-term benefit claimants deemed able to work to undertake community work or risk losing their payments, restricting disability and sickness benefits, and barring most foreign nationals from claiming benefits.
  - Democratic Unionist Party MP Jim Shannon is charged with common assault.
- 18 August
  - The Department for Transport announce disabled people in England will be able to have 24-hour free bus travel.
  - The Conservatives say they would change the law to end a "two-tier planning system" over unauthorised traveller caravans.
  - Reform UK suspends Conservative defector Tim Montgomerie after he criticised senior party figures, including Nigel Farage and Zia Yusuf.
  - Helen Butler, who was Reform UK councillor for Shepshed ward, resigns from Leicestershire County Council.
  - Mike Nesbitt resigns as Stormont's health minister amid a row with Ulster Unionist Party leader Jon Burrows.
- 19 August – Jules and Bob Rogers, two Labour councillors with Pontypool Community Council, lose their seats after not turning up to meetings for six months.
- 20 August –
  - Reform Scotland leader Malcolm Offord reveals he was diagnosed with prostate cancer on 7 May, and has undergone surgery to have his prostate removed.
  - Robbie Butler is appointed as Stormont's new health minister, replacing Mike Nesbitt.
  - Members of Oldham Borough Council, which was left with no party in overall control following the May elections, fail to vote on forming an administration, triggering the possibility that central government officials will take over the running of the authority.
- 21 August – Ofcom launches an investigation into Sky News over claims of harassment made by Nigel Farage concerning his family.
- 23 August – The UK government announces that Mayors across England will be given new powers to overrule local councils on some planning decisions.
- 25 August – The Parliamentary Commissioner on Standards launches an investigation into Democratic Unionist Party MP Gregory Campbell over potential spending breaches.
- 26 August –
  - Andy Burnham calls for a summit of Welsh, Scottish and Northern Irish first ministers.
  - A portrait of Ann Widdecombe is installed in Parliament following her death in July.
  - William Clouston resigns as leader of the Social Democratic Party (SDP).
  - Anne Donaghy, a former chief executive of Mid and East Antrim Council, is convicted of two charges connected to deleting or attempting to delete an email to prevent disclosure under the Freedom of Information Act.
- 27 August –
  - Andy Burnham makes his first visit to Northern Ireland.
  - UK Prime Minister Andy Burnham makes his first official visit to Wales, to Port Talbot, accompanied by Secretary of State for Wales (and local MP) Stephen Kinnock.
  - Senedd member Helen Jenner says she has faced criticism for attending the National Eisteddfod because she is a member of Reform.
- 28 August –
  - Burnham says he will not vote in the Terminally Ill Adults (End of Life) Bill when it is debated by Parliament in September.
  - The Scottish Government publishes a draft bill setting out plans for a Scottish independence referendum.
  - Zack Polanski calls for a moratorium on data centres.
- 29 August –
  - James Cleverly resigns as Shadow Secretary of State for Housing, Communities and Local Government to stand in the 2028 London mayoral election.
  - Reform UK form a shadow cabinet on Plymouth City Council.
- 31 August – 2026 British shadow cabinet reshuffle: Kemi Badenoch reshuffles the Shadow Cabinet, appointing Andrew Griffith as Shadow Chancellor of the Exchequer in place of Mel Stride. Claire Coutinho succeeds Griffith as Shadow Business Secretary, while Tom Tugendhat replaces Priti Patel as Shadow Foreign Secretary.

=== September ===
- 1 September –
  - The sitting of parliament resumes following summer break.
  - Sir Keir Starmer announces he is standing down as an MP to focus on a role in international affairs, triggering a by-election.
  - 2026 British shadow cabinet reshuffle: Alex Burghart is appointed as Deputy Leader of the Conservative Party.
- 2 September –
  - Andy Burnham attends his first Prime Minister's Questions as prime minister.
  - A criminal prosecution against mayor of London Sadiq Khan will be withdrawn after he was wrongfully convicted of not taxing a 24-year-old Nissan Micra, the DVLA confirms.
- 3 September –
  - Burnham meets with French president Emmanuel Macron at 10 Downing Street to discuss illegal immigration, defence, and Ukraine, as well as strengthening the UK-EU relationship.
  - Green Party leader Zack Polanski announces he wants to stand as a candidate in the Holborn and St Pancras by-election.
  - At their annual party conference in Birmingham, Reform UK announces plans to cut £80bn of public spending within five years by reducing welfare, net zero policies, overseas aid and the number of civil servants.
  - An undercover investigation for Channel 4 News appears to show aides working for Nigel Farage plotting to subvert UK electoral laws on foreign donations, as well as paying for private polls showing a favourable outcome for Reform.
  - Nathan Gill, the former leader of Reform Wales, is ordered to pay £22,500 after accepting bribes to ask pro-Russia questions in the European Parliament.
- 4 September –
  - Reform UK financial allegations:
    - Reform UK's head of policy James Orr and senior Nigel Farage aide Dan Jukes step down pending an internal investigation after a Channel 4 News undercover report alleges they sought to circumvent rules prohibiting foreign political donations. Labour and the Liberal Democrats report Reform to the Metropolitan Police, while Conservative leader Kemi Badenoch calls for police and Electoral Commission investigations.
    - Nigel Farage delivers his party conference speech setting out the first 100 days of a Reform government; the speech is overshadowed by the Channel 4 News allegations, and interrupted by hecklers.
- 7 September – Nigel Swales, who was elected to Lancashire County Council in 2025, becomes the first councillor to defect from Reform UK to Labour.
- 8 September –
  - Former Conservative MP Jane Stevenson, who lost her seat at the 2024 general election, defects to Reform UK.
  - Tim Montgomerie, who defected from the Conservatives to Reform in 2025, announces he has resigned from Reform, and tells Nigel Farage to "get a grip" of the party.
- 9 September –
  - At Prime Minister's Questions, Andy Burnham suggests that a second Scottish independence referendum could be held if there is public demand for it.
  - The Metropolitan Police launches a criminal investigation into Reform UK's donations, following the Channel 4 News report broadcast on 3 September.
- 10 September –
  - Burnham tells First Minister of Scotland John Swinney that a second independence referendum remains "off limits".
  - Anthony Lee, the Conservatives Party's former director of campaigning, and his wife, Laura, plead guilty to cheating at gambling by placing bets on the date of the 2024 general election.
  - Ricky Bell is appointed leader of Glasgow City Council, replacing Susan Aitken.
  - Reform UK expels Daniel Astley, a councillor in Newcastle upon Tyne, shortly after he apologised for a series of derogatory comments about Muslims made on a deleted X account.
- 11 September –
  - A second attempt to legalise assisted dying in England and Wales is rejected by the Commons, in a vote of 286–270. The bill would have allowed adults with fewer than six months to live to apply to be given help to end their own life, subject to certain safeguards.
  - Zack Polanski is selected as the Green Party candidate for the Holborn and St Pancras by-election.
- 12 September –
  - Reform UK receives £36 million from crypto billionaire Ben Delo, later in the day, Christopher Harborne matches the amount with a further £36 million. Both are the largest single political donations in UK history, and the total £72 million is larger than all political donations combined in 2025; calls are made on the government to impose a limit on donations.
  - During a visit to the Republic of Ireland, US President Donald Trump gave his support for a united Ireland in a meeting with the Taoiseach.
- 14 September –
  - In a joint accord signed at a rare meeting in Cardiff, the leaders of the major Scottish, Northern Irish, and Welsh parties affirm their right to "self determination."
  - Prime Minister Andy Burnham cancels all official engagements for 14 and 15 September following the death of his father, Roy.
  - Former councillor Ewan Cameron is selected as the Conservative Party candidate for the Holborn and St Pancras by-election.
  - Councillor Patrick Stillman is selected as the Liberal Democrats candidate for the Holborn and St Pancras by-election.
- 15 September –
  - Dan Thomas resigns as leader of Reform UK in Wales and leader of the opposition in the Senedd following an arrest on suspicion of assault, Helen Jenner as deputy became the acting leader.
  - Sarah Cooper-Lesadd, Senedd Member for Pen-y-Bont Bro Morgannwg defects from Reform UK to Plaid Cymru.
  - Lyndsey Fox, a councillor on Durham County Council announces her departure from Reform UK on Sky News; she is followed by two other councillors, Nicole Brown and Paul Sexton, who also leave the party, leaving them with a small majority.
  - The village of Piddington, Oxfordshire in a referendum, voted in favour of leaving the United Kingdom.
- 16 September –
  - Irish President Catherine Connolly meets First Minister John Swinney at the beginning of a four-day visit to Scotland.
  - Colin Sutton, the Norfolk Police and Crime Commissioner, cancels plans to participate in a 127-date theatre tour following criticism from senior politicians.
  - James Evans rules himself out of succeeding Dan Thomas as leader of Reform Wales.
  - Reform Wales's chief whip, Llyr Powell, says Dan Thomas will not be suspended from the party following his arrest.
- 17 September – BBC News reports that Helen Jenner is favourite to be appointed Dan Thomas's successor as Leader of Reform Wales.
- 18 September – Burnham meets Irish Taoiseach Micheál Martin for talks at Number 10 North in Manchester.
- 19 September – Michael Marra wins the 2026 Scottish Labour leadership election.
- 21 September –
  - The Scottish Government publishes proposals for council reforms that could see Scotland's 32 councils replaced with as few as six.
  - Helen Jenner is unveiled as Leader of Reform UK Wales following a vote among the party's Senedd members.
  - Former Ashfield District Council leader Jason Zadrozny is found guilty of fraud and tax evasion after setting up a fake heritage group to defraud money from Nottinghamshire County Council.
  - Steve Hunt resigns as leader of Neath Port Talbot Council following allegations he drank a whole bottle of gin at a Welsh Local Government Association conference and threatened to "wipe out" Plaid Cymru. A new council leader will be appointed on 14 October.
- 22 September –
  - Andy Burnham meets US President Donald Trump in New York during the United Nations General Assembly, their first face-to-face meeting since Burnham became prime minister. The two discuss trade, migration, the wars in Ukraine and the Middle East, the Chagos Islands, the Falkland Islands and the detention of British citizen Jimmy Lai.
  - Reform UK Scotland MSPs walk out of the Scottish Parliament's debating chamber in protest at a debate about Scottish independence.
  - Laura Anne Jones is elected as deputy leader of Reform Wales.
  - Linzi McLaren, a former Ulster Unionist Party councillor, is selected to run as a Social Democratic and Labour Party in the 2027 Stormont election.
- 23 September –
  - Defence Secretary Wes Streeting announces that the UK is reviewing its decision to hand control of the Chagos Islands to Mauritius following criticism of the deal from US President Donald Trump.
  - A man is cautioned by police as part of an investigation into assaults at the Reform UK conference in Birmingham.
- 24 September –
  - Senedd members narrowly vote to reject a motion declaring that Wales should remain as part of the UK; the motion is split 45–45, with the Presiding Officer casting a vote against it.
  - The UK government declines to offer the Stormont Government anything more than the £1.5bn made by Northern Ireland Secretary Chris Bryant.
- 25 September –
  - Burnham says he is not tempted to call an early general election, arguing it would throw "the country into a backward-looking process".
  - Burnham rules out handing the Senedd powers to call a referendum on Welsh independence.
- 26 September – A march for Wales independence takes place in Aberystwyth, and is attended by First Minister Rhun ap Iorwerth.
- 29 September –
  - Burnham tells the Labour Party Conference that the government will end the pensions "triple lock" and instead move to a "double lock" by 2030. He also announces a new "national care service", as well as plans for electoral reform, an overhaul of the leasehold system for housing, and greater public ownership of water companies.
  - First Minister John Swinney announces a review into the roles of Scotland's two most senior law officers – the Lord Advocate and Solicitor General.

=== October ===
- 4 October – At the annual party conference, members of the Green Party back a motion declaring "Zionism is racism".
- 4 October - Hounslow Labour councillor Gurbachan Singh Athwal has been arrested and charged with fraud by abuse of position.[https://www.standard.co.uk/news/politics/hounslow-labour-councillor-charged-fraud-b1299438.html West London Labour councillor arrested and charged with fraud]
- 6 October – Deputy leader of the Wales Green Party, Phil Davies, announces he has left the party after a motion to declare "Zionism is racism" is passed at the 2026 Green Party Conference.
- 8 October – The Holborn and St Pancras by-election takes place; Labour retain the seat, with Camden council leader Sagal Abdi-Wali elected as the constituency's MP.
- 9 October –
  - Zack Polanski says he will remain as Leader of the Green Party after internal pressure to step down following his loss to Labour in the Holborn and St Pancras by-election.
  - Charlie Maynard resigns from the Liberal Democrats' frontbench team in protest at Ed Davey's leadership.
- 10 October – Ellie Chowns, leader of the Green Party at Westminster, tells BBC News her party needs to make sure it is not "vulnerable to capture by extremists and racists" after members voted in favour of a motion describing Zionism as racist.
- 12 October –
  - Home Secretary Shabana Mahmood announces that political figures who are not serving MPs will be provided with police support.
  - Reform UK announces it would effectively suspend the UK's asylum system for the duration of a parliament if it were elected.
  - Votes of no confidence in First Minister Michelle O'Neill and three other Sinn Féin ministers over the Drumcree dispute fail to garner enough cross-community support from unionists and nationalists in Stormont.
- 13 October – Plaid Cymru and Welsh Labour agree a deal to provide a further £60m for the education of children with additional needs to secure Labour's support for the Welsh Government's mini-budget, which failed to pass the Senedd in the summer.
- 14 October –
  - ITV News airs a report following an undercover investigation in which councillors and candidates within Reform UK are seen to make threats of extremist behaviour and express misogynistic and racist opinions. Three councillors resign from the party as a result of the revelations, while Reform UK says it will launch an investigation into the matter.
  - Burnham rules out a coalition with the Green Party while it maintains its stance declaring Zionism as a form of racism.
- 15 October –
  - ITV News airs further footage from its undercover investigation into Reform UK, which features senior figures recorded discussing instances of racism and chauvinism within the party.
  - King Charles and Queen Camilla officially open the seventh session of the Senedd during which the King gives a speech praising the people of Wales's "sense of belonging".
  - Former DUP leader Jeffrey Donaldson is sentenced to 15 years in prison for child sex abuse.
- 16 October –
  - Burnham invites the Scottish Government to work alongside the UK government to achieve greater devolution for Scotland.
  - Alan Feeney, a Reform UK councillor who was filmed describing Asian voters as "parasites" during an ITV News undercover operation, resigns from his seats on Solihull Council and Birmingham City Council; he is also no longer a member of the party.
- 18 October – Green Party leader Zack Polanski says he will not overturn the party's rule declaring Zionism as racism.
- 19 October –
  - Amanda Bland, an MSP for Central Scotland and Lothians West, quits Reform Scotland to sit as an independent MSP at Holyrood.
  - Luke Campbell, Reform UK's elected mayor of Hull and East Yorkshire, is under police investigation for allegedly sharing naked images of himself online.
- 22 October – Carla Lockhart resigns as DUP's party officer amid a difference of opinion over how to deal with the fallout of the Drumcree dispute.
- 23 October – At a hearing at Southwark Crown Court, Anthony Lee, a former Conservative Party director of campaigning, and his wife, Laura, are given suspended prison sentences after they pleaded guilty to cheating at gambling by placing bets on the date of the 2024 general election.
- 25 October – The Board of Deputies of British Jews declares the Green Party to be a racist party following its backing of a motion that Zionism is racist.
- 25 October - Liberal Democrat Cllr Tim Casswell, speaker of Bedford Borough Council, has been charged with making threats to kill, making threats to damage or destroy property and possession of an offensive weapon in a private place.[https://www.bedfordindependent.co.uk/bedford-borough-councillor-charged-with-threats-to-kill-after-home-disturbance/ ]
- 27 October –
  - King Charles arrives in the Bahamas to begin nine day tour of the Caribbean, his first as monarch.
  - SNP MP Lara Bird, Labour MP Clive Lewis and Scottish Greens MSP Kate Nevens say they were detained by Israeli authorities for eight hours after attempting to enter the West Bank.

=== November ===
- 3 November –
  - The Plaid Cymru Welsh Government mini budget is passed in the Senedd, four months after the first attempt was defeated. Plaid Cymru and Welsh Labour came to an agreement to vote for the proposals.
  - George Madgwick, the leader of Reform UK in Hampshire, is charged with 35 offences against four victims over a 13-year period, including rape, sexual assault, controlling or coercive behaviour, and making indecent images of a child.
- 9 November – Sunderland city councillor Glenn Gibbins, a former member of Reform UK who was suspended from the party, is sentenced to a 12-month community order with 150 hours of unpaid work for a "grossly offensive" Facebook post about Nigerians made in March 2024.
- 10 November –
  - In his first major speech since becoming Scottish Labour leader, Michael Marra calls for the UK to rejoin the European Union.
  - The Welsh Government announces the establishment of the National Commission for Wales, a new body that will examine the case for Welsh independence as well as greater devolved powers for the Senedd.
  - Reform Wales MS Joe Martin is banned from speaking in the Senedd until he apologises for asking the Welsh government for a statement on the "demographic replacement of white British people".
- 11 November – Reform Wales boycotts much of the day's Senedd proceedings in protest after one of its members, MS Joe Martin, was banned from speaking after saying that white people were being "replaced" in the UK. Reform's Welsh leader Helen Jenner called it an "infringement on freedom of speech".
- 13 November - A government planning document about a planned camp for housing asylum seekers near Piddington, Oxfordshire states that the proposed security measures at the camp, a former military garrison that will house up to 1,250 male asylum seekers, "cannot eliminate all risk" to the villagers.
- 18 November –
  - Reform Wales withdraws its plans for a Senedd debate on freedom of speech as its boycott of the chamber continues.
  - SDLP Stormont MLA Daniel McCrossan apologises after using taxpayer-funded expenses to install a £500 coffee machine in his constituency office.
- 19 November –
  - Sir James Cleverly is selected as the Conservative Party candidate for the 2028 London mayoral election.
  - Bradford City Councillor Ibrar Ali is seriously injured in a stabbing incident. A man is subsequently arrested and charged with attempted murder.
- 20 November –
  - Prime Minister Andy Burnham writes to First Minister of Wales Rhun ap Iorwerth to say he is "not persuaded" by the case to devolve responsibilities over policing and justice, the Crown Estate and rail infrastructure to Wales.
  - Reform UK selects Robert Jenrick as its candidate for Newark, allowing the former Conservative MP to defend his seat at the next election.
- 21 November – The SNP writes off £60,000 in outstanding loan payments owed to the party's former chief executive, Peter Murrell, following his conviction for embezzlement.

=== December ===
- 2026 Wales Green Party leadership election

== Publications ==
- 26 October – Bank Job: A Short Book on How the Bank of England Broke the Bond Market and Brought Down the Government by Liz Truss, Free Speech Press.

== Deaths ==
- 2 January – Sir Patrick Duffy, 105, British politician, MP (1963–1966, 1970–1992) and president of the NATO Assembly (1988–1990).
- 3 January – Gerry Gable, 88, British political activist and magazine editor (Searchlight).
- 27 January – Joan Hall, 90, British politician, MP (1970–1974) and Margaret Thatcher's chauffeur.
- 29 January – Jim Wallace, Baron Wallace of Tankerness, 71, Scottish politician, acting first minister (2000, 2001) and deputy first minister (1999–2005), complications from surgery.
- 30 January – David Triesman, Baron Triesman, 82, British politician and trade union leader, member of the House of Lords (since 2004).
- 5 February – Ken Weetch, 92, British politician, MP (1974–1987).
- 6 February – John Burton, 85, British political agent in Sedgefield.
- 7 February – Jeane Freeman,72, British businesswoman and politician, MSP (2016–2021) and cabinet secretary for health and sport (2018–2021), cancer.
- 16 February – Harry Barnes, 89, English politician, MP (1987–2005), cancer.
- 27 February – Margaret Farquhar, 95, Scottish politician, lord provost of Aberdeen (1996–1999). (death announced on this date)
- 3 March – Andrew Watson, 64, British Anglican clergyman, bishop of Aston (2008–2014) and Guildford (since 2014), member of the House of Lords (since 2022), pancreatic cancer.
- 14 March – Phil Woolas, 66, British politician, MP (1997–2010), brain cancer.
- 25 March – David Winnick, 92, British politician, MP (1966–1970, 1979–2017).
- 30 March – Christopher Haskins, 88, Irish-born businessman and life peer, member of the House of Lords (1998–2020). (death announced on this date)
- 9 April – Jeremy Beecham, Baron Beecham, 81, British politician, member of the House of Lords (2010–2021), complications from Alzheimer's disease.
- 16 April – Tony Clarke, Baron Clarke of Stone-cum-Ebony, 82, British lawyer, judge and life peer, member of the House of Lords (2009–2020).
- 20 April – Julian Hunt, Baron Hunt of Chesterton, 84, British meteorologist and life peer, member of the House of Lords (2000–2021), vascular dementia.
- 21 April – Robin Vanden-Bempde-Johnstone, 5th Baron Derwent, 95, British hereditary peer, member of the House of Lords (1986–1999).
- 4 May – Dame Shirley Porter, 95, British politician, leader of the Westminster City Council (1983–1991) and lord mayor of Westminster (1991–1992). (death announced on this date)
- 14 May – Caroline Jones, 71, British politician, leader of UKIP in the Senedd and former MS, sepsis.
- 22 May – Sir Jeremy Hanley, 80, British politician, MP (1983–1997).
- 25 May – Flick Rea, 88, English Liberal Democrat politician, Camden Borough councillor (1986–2021).
- 28 May – Meta Ramsay, Baroness Ramsay of Cartvale, 89, Scottish intelligence officer and peer, member of the House of Lords (since 1996).
- 1 June –
  - Alan Haselhurst, Baron Haselhurst, 88, British politician, MP (1970–1974, 1977–2017) and member of the House of Lords (2018–2024).
  - Michael Meadowcroft, 84, English politician, MP (1983–1987).
- 13 June – Roy Hattersley, 93, British politician, MP (1964–1997) and member of the House of Lords (1997–2017).
- 16 June – John Savile, 8th Earl of Mexborough, 95, British hereditary peer.
- 22 June – John Dewar, 4th Baron Forteviot, 88, British hereditary peer, member of the House of Lords (1994–1999).
- 30 June – Sir Neville Trotter, 94, British politician, MP (1974–1997). (death announced on this date)
- 6 July – Sir George Howarth, 77, British politician, MP (1986–2024). (death announced on this date)
- 7 July – James Mackay, Baron Mackay of Clashfern, 99, Scottish lawyer and life peer, Lord Advocate (1979–1984), Lord Clerk Register (2007–2022), and member of the House of Lords (1979–2022).
- 10 July – Ann Widdecombe, 78, British politician and television personality, MP (1987–2010), suspected murder. (death announced on this date)
- 15 July – Herbert Laming, Baron Laming, 89, British social worker and life peer, member of the House of Lords (since 1998).
- 23 July – Annie Courtney, Northern Irish politician, member of the Derry City Council (1985–2005) and MLA (2000–2003).
- 25 July – John Horam, Baron Horam, 87, British politician, MP (1970–1983, 1992–2010) and member of the House of Lords (since 2013), complications from a fall. (death announced on this date)
- 14 August – Peter Snape, Baron Snape, 84, British politician, MP (1974–2001) and member of the House of Lords (since 2004). (death announced on this date)
- 24 August – Gathorne Gathorne-Hardy, 5th Earl of Cranbrook, 93, British zoologist and peer, member of the House of Lords (1978–1999).
- 19 September – Keith Wakefield, 78, English politician, leader of Leeds City Council (2003–2004, 2010–2015).
- 23 September – Paul Butler, Northern Irish politician, MLA (2007–2011).
- 5 October – Jeffrey Archer, Baron Archer of Weston-super-Mare, 86, British politician and author (Kane and Abel, Only Time Will Tell, A Prison Diary), MP (1969–1974) and member of the House of Lords (1992–2024).
- 9 October – Alan Thornett, 89, British activist and car worker.
- 12 October – James Lindesay-Bethune, 16th Earl of Lindsay, 70, Scottish hereditary peer, businessman and politician, member of the House of Lords (1989–2026). (death announced on this date)
- 14 October – Pat Karney, 78, Irish-born British politician.
- 19 October – Andy King, 78, British politician, MP (1997–2005). (death announced on this date)
- 23 October – Lorn Cowie, Lord Cowie, 100, Scottish rugby union player (West of Scotland, national team) and jurist, senator of the College of Justice (1977–1994).
