= List of wards in Nuneaton and Bedworth by population =

This is a guide to the size of the wards in Nuneaton and Bedworth based on the data from the 2001 UK Census. The entire population of the district was 119,132.

Rank	Ward	Population
1	Galley Common	7,593
2	Attleborough	7,564
3	Bar Pool	7,451
4	Whitestone	7,435
5	Exhall	7,381
6	Camp Hill	7,325
7	Weddington	7,286
8	Abbey	7,234
9	Wem Brook	7,082
10	St Nicolas	7,073
11	Slough	7,058
12	Kingswood	6,878
13	Poplar	6,850
14	Bede	6,760
15	Heath	6,377
16	Bulkington	6,303
17	Arbury	5,482

NB Ward populations may differ from the population of the suburb or village after which they are named, as ward boundaries are often somewhat arbitrary and do not always match the generally accepted boundaries of localities.
