= Nuneaton Town Hall =

Municipal building in Nuneaton, Warwickshire, England

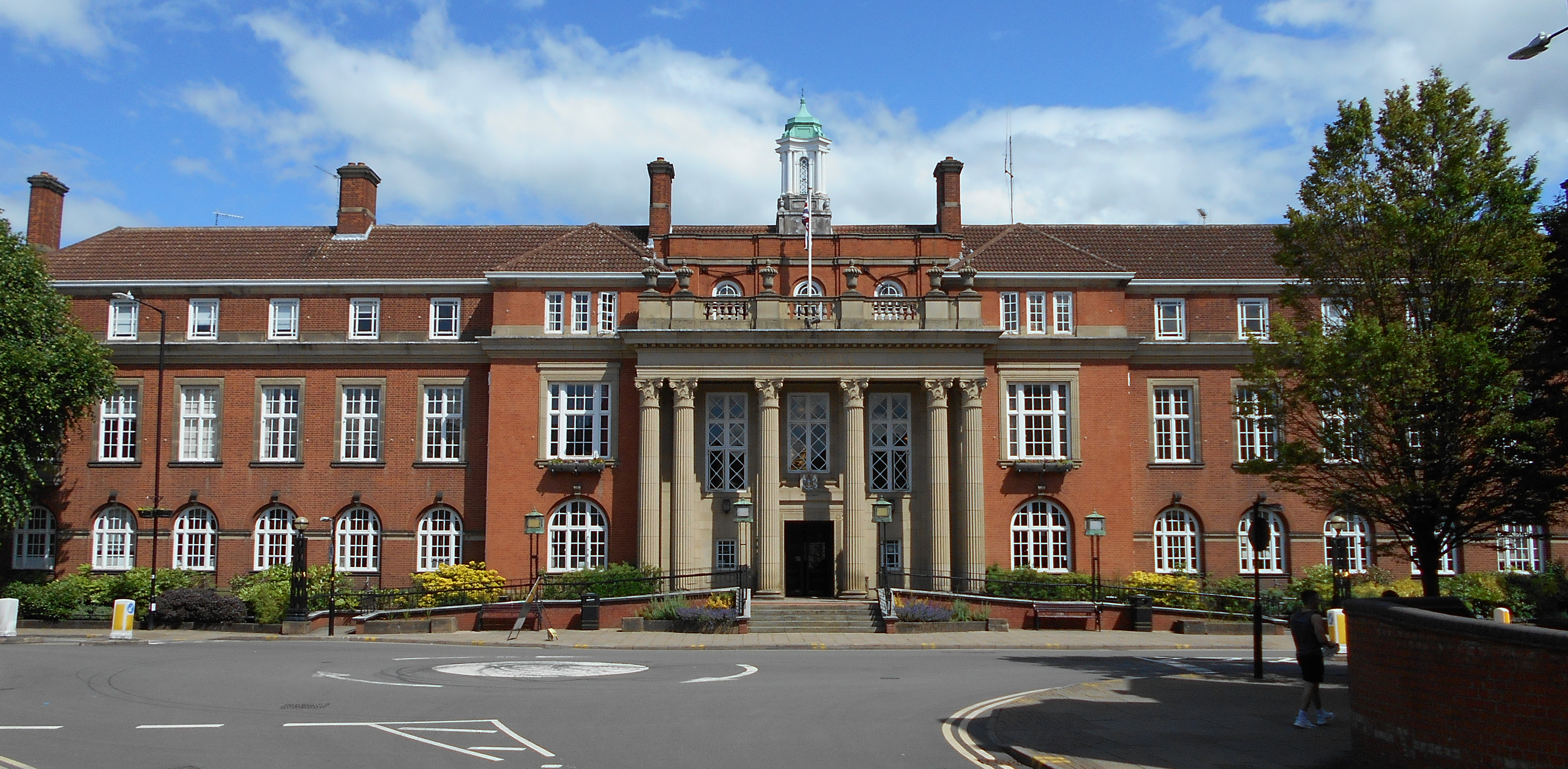
- Nuneaton Town Hall
- Interactive map of the Nuneaton Town Hall area

General information
- Architectural style: Neoclassical
- Location: Coton Road, Nuneaton, Warwickshire
- Coordinates: 52.521832°N 1.467305°W
- Inaugurated: 1934
- Owner: Nuneaton and Bedworth Borough Council

Nuneaton Town Hall is a municipal building on Coton Road in the town of Nuneaton, Warwickshire, England. The building is the headquarters of Nuneaton and Bedworth Borough Council.

== History ==
From 1894, the Nuneaton Urban District Council (which became Nuneaton Borough Council in 1907 when Nuneaton became a municipal borough) had operated from offices in Queen's Road. By 1930 these had become too small to house the growing demand for municipal services, and so the council looked to construct a larger building. Land was purchased at the site on Coton Road for this purpose. Buildings demolished on the site included the old Nuneaton Free Library and Clare Speight's photographic studios.

The building was designed by Peacock & Bewley of Birmingham in a restrained neoclassical style. The design involved a symmetrical main frontage with 17 bays; a projecting central section included a large three-bay, two-storey, hexastyle composite order portico with a doorway surmounted by the borough coat of arms on the ground floor and three windows with entablature above on the first floor. A lantern was erected at roof level. Using mostly local materials, the construction works started in December 1931 and took two years to complete. The building was formally opened by the former local member of parliament, Sir Francis Newdegate, on 26 April 1934.

The three-storey building housed all of the council's departments, as well as the council chamber, committee rooms, and the mayor's parlour. The building was initially known as the "Council House", but was later renamed as the "Town Hall". Local government reorganisation in 1974 merged the Borough of Nuneaton with the urban district of Bedworth, and the Town Hall became the headquarters of the newly constituted Nuneaton and Bedworth Council.

After the local electricity works, located just to the south of the town hall, had been demolished, a modern extension, which became known as the "Council House", was built in the 1980s to accommodate some of the council officers and their departments. In 2015, the town hall was identified as one of several buildings in the town which "convey messages of authority and civic pride".

On 16 December 2019, a fire broke out in part of the building causing it to be evacuated. 30 firefighters from Warwickshire Fire and Rescue Service were involved in tackling the fire, which was successfully contained to a small area of the upper floors and roof. An investigation showed that it had been started accidentally by workmen using a blowtorch while carrying out roof repairs.
