= 2026 Nuneaton and Bedworth Borough Council election =

Local election in Warwickshire, England

2026 Nuneaton & Bedworth Borough Council election
- 7 May 2026

19 out of 38 seats to Nuneaton & Bedworth Borough Council 20 seats needed for a majority
	First party	Second party	Third party
Leader		Steve Hey	Kris Wilson
Party	Reform	Labour	Conservative
Last election	Did not stand	20 seats, 45.0%	16 seats, 44.1%
Seats before	0	18	17
Seats won	15	2	0
Seats after	15	11	9
Seat change	▲15	▼7	▼8
Popular vote	16,715	6,860	7,963
Percentage	43.3%	17.8%	20.6%
Swing	N/A	▼27.2%	▼23.5%
	Fourth party	Fifth party
Leader	Michele Kondakor	Rob Roze
Party	Green	Liberal Democrats
Last election	2 seats, 7.7%	0 seats, 0.1%
Seats before	2	1
Seats won	2	0
Seats after	3	0
Seat change	▲1	▼1
Popular vote	6,575	334
Percentage	17.0%	0.9%
Swing	▲9.3%	▲0.8%
- Winner of each seat at the 2026 Nuneaton & Bedworth Borough Council election.
Leader before election
Steve Hey
Labour
No overall control (Note: Labour minority.)
Leader after election
George Finch
Reform
No overall control (Note: Reform minority.)

The 2026 Nuneaton and Bedworth Borough Council election was held on 7 May 2026, alongside the other local elections across the United Kingdom being held on the same day, to elect 19 of 38 members of Nuneaton and Bedworth Borough Council in Warwickshire, England.

Prior to the election, the council was under no overall control, being run by a Labour minority administration. The council remained under no overall control at this election. Reform UK, which held no seats on the council before the election, won 15 of the 19 seats contested at this election. They therefore overtook Labour to become the largest party on the council, but were left five seats short of a majority. The incumbent Labour leader of the council, Steve Hey, lost his seat. After the election, the new Reform group chose George Finch, who was already the leader of Warwickshire County Council, to be its group leader. He was formally confirmed as the new leader of Nuneaton and Bedworth Borough Council at its subsequent annual council meeting on 20 May 2026, leading a Reform minority administration.

Due to ongoing local government reorganisation, this will be the final election to Nuneaton & Bedworth Borough Council before it is abolished and replaced by a successor unitary authority. Elections to the successor authority are due to take place in 2027.

== Summary ==
=== Background ===
In 2024, the Conservative Party lost control of the council to the Labour Party. Subsequent changes of allegiance saw Labour lose its majority in December 2024, but the party continued to run the council afterwards as a minority administration.

Due to ongoing local government reorganisation, the Local Government Secretary, Steve Reed, wrote to all local authorities due to have elections in 2026, asking if they would like to delay their elections to 2027. The council's Labour group supported delaying the election, while the opposition parties were against the plans. The Labour leader of the council, Chris Watkins, said, "it was felt that holding [the election] for a local authority that is shortly to be abolished is not a prudent use of resources".

Following this, an extraordinary meeting of the council was held on 21 January 2026, and a motion of no confidence in the council leader was moved by Conservative leader Kris Wilson (Whitestone). The motion passed with the support of the Conservative, Green, and Liberal Democrat councillors, and Watkins was removed from the position. Labour councillor Steve Hey (Attleborough) was subsequently selected at the same meeting to replace Watkins as leader. He was confirmed in this role after receiving support from the Labour and Green groups.

=== Council composition ===
After 2024 election		Before 2026 election	
Party	Seats	Party	Seats
Labour	20	Labour	18
Conservative	16	Conservative	17
Green	2	Green	2
Liberal Democrats	0	Liberal Democrats	1

Changes 2024–2026:

- December 2024: Will Markham (Labour) joins Conservatives
- August 2025: Rob Roze (Labour) leaves party to sit as an independent
- September 2025: Rob Roze (Independent) joins Liberal Democrats

== Incumbents ==
Ward	Incumbent councillor	Party	Re-standing
Arbury	Christian Smith	Labour	No
Attleborough	Steve Hey	Labour	Yes
Bede	Anne-Marie Bull	Labour	No
Bulkington	Richard Smith	Conservative	No
Camp Hill	Eric Amaechi	Labour	Yes
Chilvers Coton	Tony Venson	Labour	Yes
Eastboro	Mark Etienne	Conservative	No
Exhall	Tim Jenkins	Labour	No
Galley Common	Samuel Croft	Conservative	No
Heath	Rob Roze (Note: Originally elected as a Labour councillor, but subsequently defected to the Liberal Democrats.)	Liberal Democrats	Yes
Milby	Jonathan Collett	Conservative	No
Poplar	Amarhit Khangura	Conservative	No
Slough	Martin Walsh	Conservative	Yes
St Mary's	Jill Sheppard	Labour	No
St Nicolas	Jamie Hartshorn	Conservative	Yes
Stockingford East	Nicky King (Note: Standing in St Mary's.)	Labour	Yes
Stockingford West	Kathleen Price	Labour	Yes
Weddington	Mike Wright	Green	Yes
Whitestone	Julian Gutteridge	Conservative	No

== Election result ==
Council composition after the 2024 election

Council composition after the 2026 election

2026 Nuneaton & Bedworth Borough Council election
Party	This election				Full council			This election		
Party	Candidates	Seats	Net	Seats %	Other	Total	Total %	Votes	Votes %	+/−
Reform	{{{candidates}}}	15	▲15	78.9	0	15	39.5	16,715	43.3	N/A
Labour	{{{candidates}}}	2	▼7	10.5	9	11	29.0	6,860	17.8	–27.2
Conservative	{{{candidates}}}	0	▼8	0.0	9	9	23.7	7,963	20.6	–23.5
Green	{{{candidates}}}	2	▲1	10.5	1	3	7.9	6,575	17.0	+9.3
Liberal Democrats	{{{candidates}}}	0	▼1	0.0	0	0	0.0	334	0.9	+0.8
TUSC	{{{candidates}}}	0	Steady	0.0	0	0	0.0	169	0.4	–1.2

== Ward results ==
=== Arbury ===
Arbury
Party	Candidate	Votes	%	±%
Reform	Nita Bagga	958	46.5	N/A
Conservative	Pauly Palamattom	396	19.2	–24.4
Labour	Fred Harper	324	15.7	–30.9
Green	Maggie Morrissey	264	12.8	N/A
Liberal Democrats	Paul Hadley	111	5.4	N/A
TUSC	Eve Miller	8	0.4	–9.4
Majority		562	27.3	N/A
Turnout		2,061	36.5	+9.6
Reform gain from Labour				

=== Attleborough ===
Attleborough
Party	Candidate	Votes	%	±%
Reform	Mike Bannister	900	46.5	N/A
Conservative	Vijay Rughoo	365	18.9	–19.6
Labour Co-op	Steve Hey*	355	18.3	–28.6
Green	Tess Brookes	316	16.3	N/A
Majority		535	27.6	N/A
Turnout		1,936	35.2	+9.9
Reform gain from Labour Co-op				

=== Bede ===
Bede
Party	Candidate	Votes	%	±%
Reform	George Finch	1,320	57.3	N/A
Labour	Ivy Winters-Wanjiru	618	26.8	–35.2
Conservative	Steven Coleman	364	15.8	–22.2
Majority		702	30.5	N/A
Turnout		2,302	36.4	+12.1
Reform gain from Labour				

=== Bulkington ===
Bulkington
Party	Candidate	Votes	%	±%
Reform	Paul Smith	956	42.5	N/A
Conservative	Jack Markham	804	35.7	–26.3
Labour	Campbell McKee	247	11.0	–27.0
Green	Richard Cope	244	10.8	N/A
Majority		152	6.8	N/A
Turnout		2,251	42.8	+11.2
Reform gain from Conservative				

=== Camp Hill ===
Camp Hill
Party	Candidate	Votes	%	±%
Reform	Colin Cape	740	46.1	N/A
Labour	Eric Amaechi*	370	23.1	–32.3
Green	Emma Shiers	285	17.8	N/A
Conservative	Romaine Tabet	185	11.5	–21.8
TUSC	Christopher Gamble	24	1.5	–9.8
Majority		370	23.0	N/A
Turnout		1,604	28.8	+9.7
Reform gain from Labour				

=== Chilvers Coton ===
Chilvers Coton
Party	Candidate	Votes	%	±%
Labour	Tony Venson*	627	35.5	–12.9
Reform	Carolyn Russell	609	34.4	N/A
Green	Jamal Lydon	367	20.8	–0.5
Conservative	Susan Dalziel	152	8.6	–7.2
TUSC	Max McGee	13	0.7	–13.9
Majority		18	0.1	N/A
Turnout		1,768	35.3	+10.6
Labour hold				

=== Eastboro ===
Eastboro
Party	Candidate	Votes	%	±%
Reform	Richard Brill	647	36.7	N/A
Conservative	Hari Khela	528	29.9	–18.1
Green	James Hunter	364	20.6	+1.8
Labour	Sunday Ajayi	225	12.8	–20.4
Majority		119	6.8	N/A
Turnout		1,764	37.2	+8.0
Reform gain from Conservative				

=== Exhall ===
Exhall
Party	Candidate	Votes	%	±%
Reform	Chris Morris	840	43.6	N/A
Labour	Sinead Mulholland	377	19.6	–19.1
Conservative	Pete Gilbert	357	18.5	–25.7
Green	Merle Gering	314	16.3	+6.9
TUSC	Eileen Hunter	39	2.0	–2.1
Majority		463	24.0	N/A
Turnout		1,927	34.9	+6.1
Reform gain from Labour				

=== Galley Common ===
Galley Common
Party	Candidate	Votes	%	±%
Reform	James Bartlett	1,159	53.4	N/A
Conservative	Richard Baxter-Payne	384	17.7	–29.8
Labour	Theo Osemele	316	14.6	–37.9
Green	Gemma Perry	312	14.4	N/A
Majority		775	35.7	N/A
Turnout		2,171	34.6	+7.7
Reform gain from Conservative				

=== Heath ===
Heath
Party	Candidate	Votes	%	±%
Reform	Ali Brassington	1,121	50.1	N/A
Labour	Julie Jackson	425	19.0	–35.9
Conservative	Sandra Walsh	324	14.5	–30.6
Green	Richard Green	200	8.9	N/A
Liberal Democrats	Rob Roze*	169	7.5	N/A
Majority		696	31.1	N/A
Turnout		2,239	35.3	+9.8
Reform gain from Liberal Democrats				

=== Milby ===
Milby
Party	Candidate	Votes	%	±%
Green	Keith Kondakor	639	44.8	▲19.4
Reform	Paul Biggs	404	28.3	N/A
Conservative	Harvey Gill	304	21.3	▼26.8
Labour	Michael Fowler	80	5.6	▼20.9
Majority		235	16.5	N/A
Turnout		1,427	49.6	▲17.0
Green gain from Conservative				

=== Poplar ===
Poplar
Party	Candidate	Votes	%	±%
Reform	Stan Carvell	746	39.7	N/A
Conservative	Jas Singh	461	24.5	–23.2
Green	Krissi Cope	346	18.4	+6.9
Labour	Adam Bourne	326	17.3	–23.5
Majority		285	15.2	N/A
Turnout		1,879	34.0	+5.4
Reform gain from Conservative				

=== Slough ===
Slough
Party	Candidate	Votes	%	±%
Reform	Bobbie Greenwood	1,063	45.8	N/A
Conservative	Martin Walsh*	691	29.8	–9.1
Labour	Paul Waldron	350	15.1	–19.9
Green	Dan Walker	184	7.9	N/A
TUSC	Mark Burdett	32	1.4	–3.3
Majority		372	16.0	N/A
Turnout		2,320	39.6	+9.4
Reform gain from Conservative				

=== St Mary's ===
St Mary's
Party	Candidate	Votes	%	±%
Labour	Nicky King*	770	39.2	–30.3
Reform	Jon-Paul Clift	639	32.5	N/A
Green	Richard Heathcock	329	16.8	N/A
Conservative	Scott Harbison	194	9.9	–20.6
TUSC	Steven Gee	32	1.6	N/A
Majority		131	6.7	N/A
Turnout		1,964	32.2	+10.2
Labour hold				

=== St Nicolas ===
St Nicolas
Party	Candidate	Votes	%	±%
Reform	Jake Groves	844	35.3	N/A
Conservative	Jamie Hartshorn*	684	28.6	–22.1
Green	Miranda Bishop-Timings	636	26.6	+4.9
Labour	Mustafa Dogal	224	9.4	–14.6
Majority		160	6.7	N/A
Turnout		2,388	50.3	+12.7
Reform gain from Conservative				

=== Stockingford East ===
Stockingford East
Party	Candidate	Votes	%	±%
Reform	Stuart Finch	856	46.1	N/A
Labour	Matthew Smith	427	23.0	–36.1
Green	Spring Vernon	292	15.7	N/A
Conservative	Sebastian Gran	261	14.1	–26.8
TUSC	Daniel Webb	21	1.1	N/A
Majority		429	23.1	N/A
Turnout		1,857	34.4	+9.4
Reform gain from Labour				

=== Stockingford West ===
Stockingford West
Party	Candidate	Votes	%	±%
Reform	Shane Coates-Jarman	1,086	57.1	N/A
Labour	Kath Price*	355	18.7	–38.2
Green	David Fletcher	236	12.4	N/A
Conservative	Abi Olaifa	224	11.8	–22.1
Majority		731	38.4	N/A
Turnout		1,901	32.1	+9.9
Reform gain from Labour				

=== Weddington ===
Weddington
Party	Candidate	Votes	%	±%
Green	Mike Wright*	969	44.3	▼9.4
Reform	John New	775	35.5	N/A
Conservative	Lilian Pilkington	266	12.2	▼9.6
Labour	Kani Dogal	122	5.6	▼11
Liberal Democrats	Joy Salaja	54	2.5	▼0.2
Majority		194	8.8	N/A
Turnout		2,186	42.2	▼9.6
Green hold				

=== Whitestone ===
Whitestone
Party	Candidate	Votes	%	±%
Reform	Daljit Boughan	1,052	39.4	N/A
Conservative	Michael Green	1,019	38.2	–20.5
Labour	Dianne Fowler	322	12.1	–16.3
Green	Mick Ludford	278	10.4	–2.4
Majority		33	0.2	N/A
Turnout		2,671	48.8	+11.4
Reform gain from Conservative				

== By-elections ==
=== Camp Hill ===
A by-election was called after the resignation of councillor Sharon Dhillon.

Camp Hill by-election: 25 June 2026
Party	Candidate	Votes	%	±%
Reform	Peter Gilbert	460	48.7	+2.6
Labour	Eric Amaechi	400	42.4	+19.3
Conservative	Hari Khela	84	8.9	−2.6
Turnout			16.8	−12.0
Reform gain from Labour				
