= Nuneaton and Bedworth =

Coordinates: 52.5218°N 1.4676°W

- Borough and non-metropolitan district
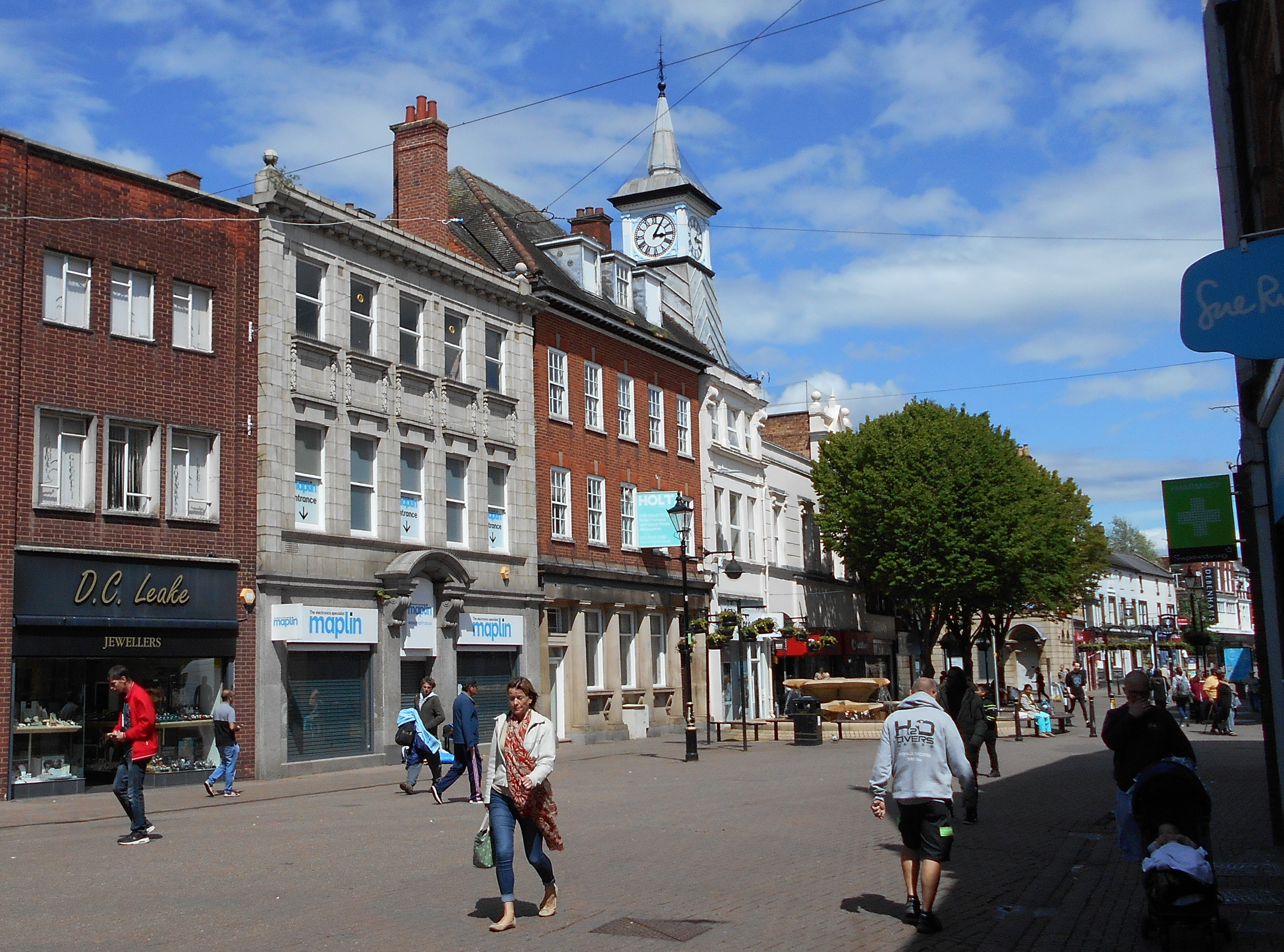
- Market Place in Nuneaton, the borough's largest town

- Shown within Warwickshire
- Sovereign state: United Kingdom
- Constituent country: England
- Region: West Midlands
- Non-metropolitan county: Warwickshire
- Admin. HQ: Nuneaton

Government
  - Type: Non-metropolitan borough
  - MPs: Jodie Gosling; Rachel Taylor; John Slinger

Area
  - Total: 31 sq mi (79 km^{2})
  - Rank: 218th

Population (2024)
  - Total: 141,565
  - Rank: Ranked 167th
  - Density: 4,600/sq mi (1,800/km^{2})

Ethnicity (2021)
  - Ethnic groups: List: 87.1% White; 8% Asian; 1.8% Mixed; 1.8% Black; 1.2% other

Religion (2021)
  - Religion: List: 48.5% Christianity; 37.8% no religion; 3% Islam; 1.6% Hinduism; 0.1% Judaism; 2.6% Sikhism; 0.5% Buddhism; 0.6% other; 5.3% not stated
- Time zone: UTC+0 (Greenwich Mean Time)
  - Summer (DST): UTC+1 (British Summer Time)
- Postcode: CV7, CV10, CV11, CV12
- ONS code: 44UC (ONS); E07000219 (GSS)

Nuneaton and Bedworth is a local government district with borough status in Warwickshire, England. It includes the towns of Nuneaton (where the council is based) and Bedworth, as well as a modest rural hinterland including the village of Bulkington.

The neighbouring districts are Rugby, Coventry, North Warwickshire and Hinckley and Bosworth.

== History ==
The district was created on 1 April 1974 under the Local Government Act 1972, by a merger of two former districts which were both abolished at the same time, these were:

- Bedworth Urban District (which included Ash Green, Bulkington, Exhall, and part of Keresley)
- Nuneaton Municipal Borough

The new district was initially named Nuneaton, after its largest town. Nuneaton's borough status, which it had held since 1907, was transferred to the enlarged district, allowing the chair of the council to take the title of mayor. Following a campaign from Bedworth residents the borough's name was changed to "Nuneaton and Bedworth" with effect from 1 October 1980.

== Abolition ==
Under current local government reorganisation plans, all district councils in Warwickshire, as well as the county council, will be abolished in 2028, with the district forming part of a new North Warwickshire unitary authority, also including the areas of the Rugby and North Warwickshire districts.

== Governance ==
Nuneaton and Bedworth Borough Council

Type
- Type: Non-metropolitan district

Leadership
- Mayor: Colin Cape, Reform UK since 22 May 2026
- Leader: George Finch, Reform UK since 20 May 2026
- Chief Executive: Tom Shardlow since 1 June 2024

Structure
- Seats: 38 councillors
- Graph of the party split among 38 seats.
- Political groups: Administration (16) Reform (16) Other parties (22) Labour (10) Conservative (9) Green (3)

Elections
- Voting system: First past the post
- Last election: 2 May 2026

Meeting place
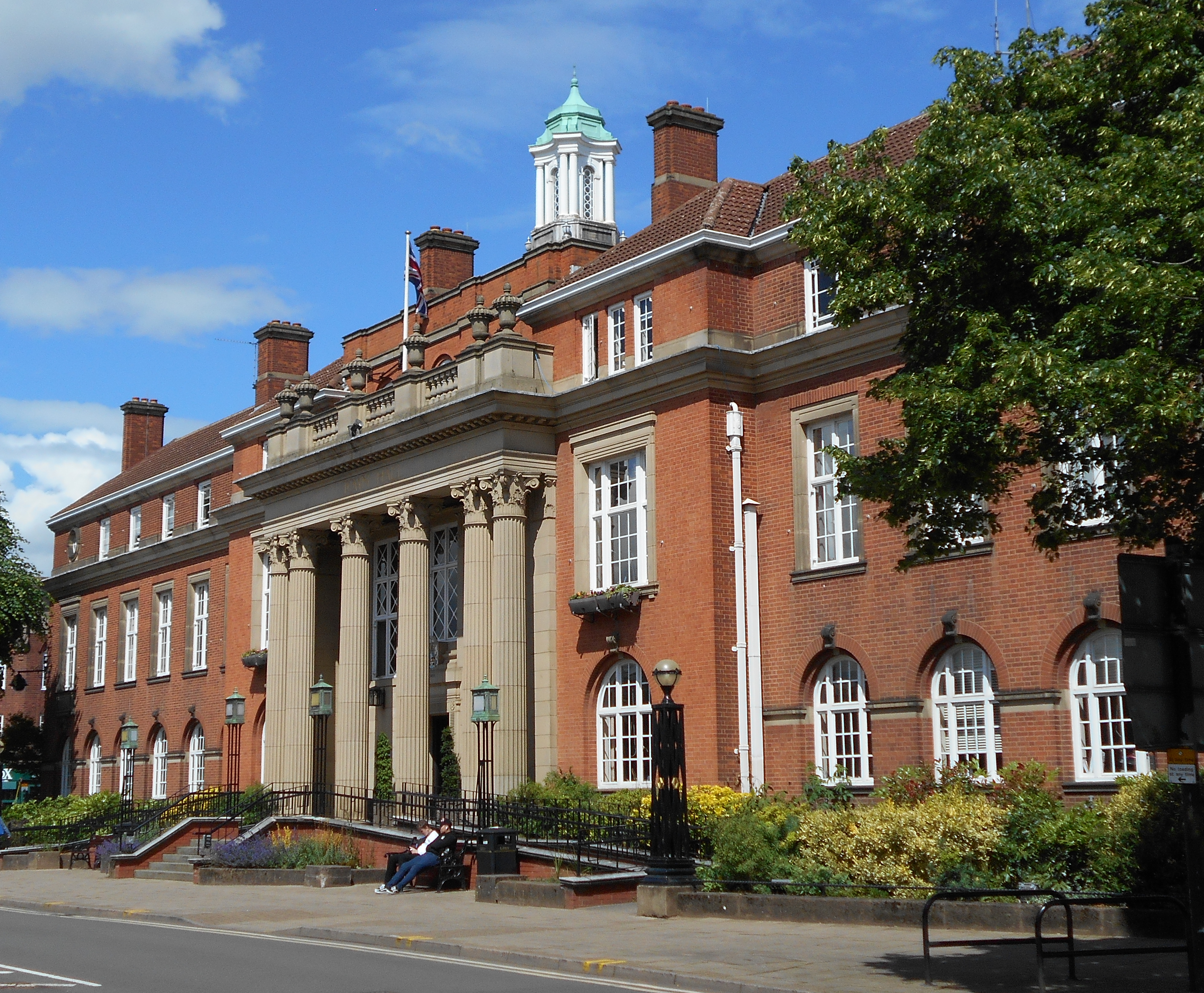
- Town Hall, Coton Road, Nuneaton, CV11 5AA

Website
- www.nuneatonandbedworth.gov.uk

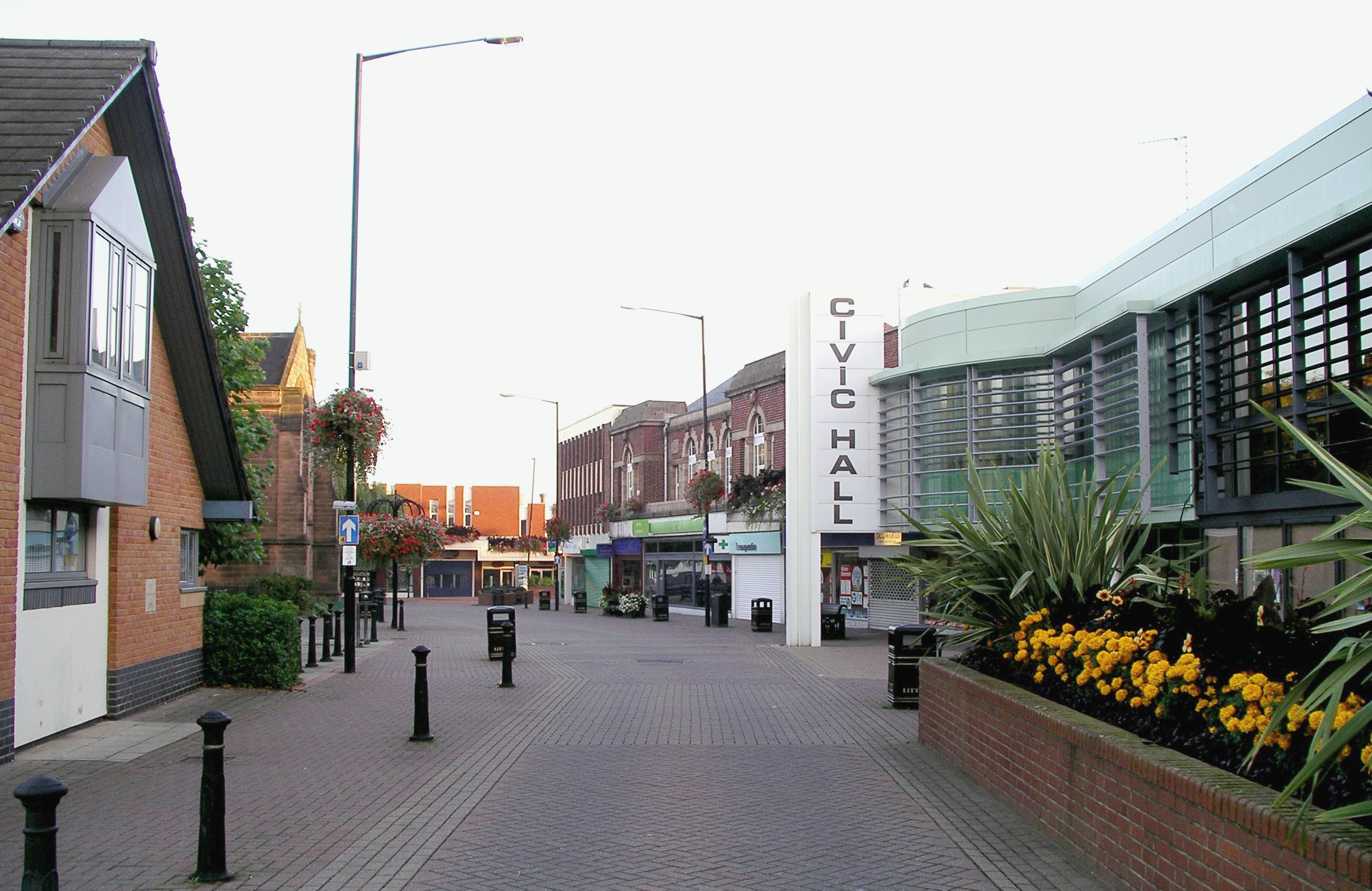
Bedworth, the second town and second-largest settlement in the borough

Nuneaton and Bedworth Borough Council provides district-level services. County-level services are provided by Warwickshire County Council. There are no civil parishes in the borough, which is an unparished area.

=== Political control ===
The council has been under no overall control since December 2024. At the 2026 election the council remained under no overall control, but Reform UK overtook Labour to become the largest party, since when Reform have been running the council as a minority administration.

Political control of the council since the 1974 reforms has been as follows:

Party in control	Years
Labour	1974–2008
Conservative	2008–2010
No overall control	2010–2012
Labour	2012–2018
No overall control	2018–2021
Conservative	2021–2024
Labour	2024–2024
No overall control	2024–present

=== Leadership ===
The role of mayor is largely ceremonial in Nuneaton and Bedworth. Political leadership is provided instead by the leader of the council. The leaders since 1974 have been:

Councillor	Party	From	To
Fred Warr	Labour	1 Apr 1974	Jan 1975
John Haynes	Labour	Feb 1975	1982
Bill Olner	Labour	May 1982	May 1986
Dennis Harvey	Labour	1986	May 2008
Marcus Jones	Conservative	May 2008	2009
Peter Gilbert	Conservative	2009	May 2010
Dennis Harvey	Labour	May 2010	May 2018
Julie Jackson	Labour	16 May 2018	May 2021
Kris Wilson	Conservative	19 May 2021	15 May 2024
Chris Watkins	Labour	15 May 2024	21 Jan 2026
Steve Hey	Labour	21 Jan 2026	May 2026
George Finch	Reform	20 May 2026	

=== Composition ===
Following the 2026 election, and a subsequent by-election in June 2026, the composition of the council was:

Party	Councillors
Reform	16
Labour	10
Conservative	9
Green	3
Total	38

=== Elections ===
Since the last boundary changes in 2024 the council has comprised 38 councillors representing 19 wards, with each ward electing two councillors. Elections are held in alternate years, with half the council (one councillor for each ward) elected each time for a four-year term of office.

=== Premises ===
The council is based at Nuneaton Town Hall on Coton Road in Nuneaton. The building was purpose-built for the old Nuneaton Borough Council and opened in 1934.

== Subdivisions ==
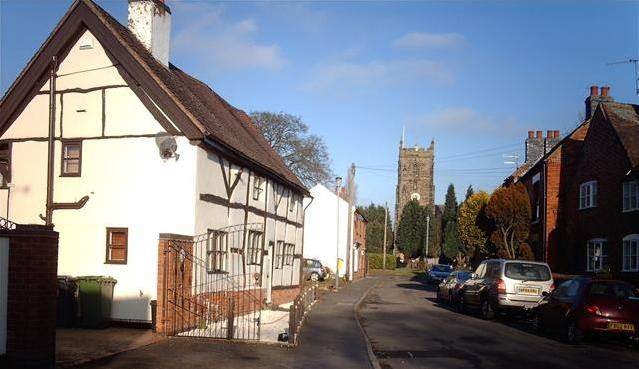
Bulkington, the third-largest settlement in the borough

Wards of Nuneaton and Bedworth 2002 - 2024

Nuneaton and Bedworth are divided into 19 wards, each represented by 2 councillors, giving a total of 38 councillors. The borough has no civil parishes.

Ward name	Approximate coverage	Population (2001 census)	Population (2011 census)
Arbury	Heath End, Glendale, Bermuda, Arbury	5,482	6,736
Attleborough	Attleborough, Maple Park, SW Whitestone	7,564	7,676
Bede	Collycroft (east), Furnace Fields (north), Bedworth town centre, Burnside, Water Tower estate	6,760	6,666
Bulkington	Bulkington, Weston-in-Arden, Ryton, Marston Jabbett, Bramcote (west)	6,303	6,146
Camp Hill	Camp Hill	7,325	7,321
Chilvers Coton	Chilvers Coton		
Eastboro	Eastboro		
Exhall	Exhall (west), Ash Green, Neals Green, Keresley End	7,381	8,006
Galley Common	Galley Common, Chapel End, Whittleford	7,593	8,233
Heath	Bedworth Heath, Goodyers End, Market End	6,377	7,473
Milby	Milby		
Poplar	Furnace Fields (south), Coalpit Field, Exhall (east), Hawkesbury Village	6,850	8,043
Slough	Collycroft (west), Mount Pleasant, Bedworth Woodlands, Woodland Park	7,058	7,041
St Mary's	St Mary's		
St Nicolas	Horeston Grange, Hinckley Road, The Long Shoot, St Nicolas Park (south)	7,073	6,943
Stockingford East	Stockingford East		
Stockingford West	Stockingford West		
Weddington	Weddington, St Nicolas Park (north)	7,286	7,256
Whitestone	Whitestone (except SW part), Attleborough Fields	7,435	6,877
TOTAL	NUNEATON & BEDWORTH	119,132	125,252

For a sortable list of wards in Nuneaton and Bedworth by population, see List of wards in Nuneaton and Bedworth by population.

== Twinnings ==
Nuneaton and Bedworth is twinned with:

- Roanne, France
- Guadalajara, Castile-La Mancha, Spain
- Cottbus, Germany
