= Courts and Tribunals Bill =

- Bill
- Parliament of the United Kingdom
- Long title: A Bill to Make provision in relation to criminal courts in England and Wales; to make provision about the leadership of tribunals; to amend section 1 of the Children Act 1989 to remove the presumption relating to the involvement of parents in the life of a child; and for connected purposes.
- Introduced by: David Lammy (Commons)

Status: Not passed

The Courts and Tribunals Bill is a proposed act of parliament that would, most notably, restrict the use of juries in trials.

The bill passed a vote in the House of Commons on the 10th of March 2026, with MPs voting 304-203 in favour. The bill is now in the committee stage.

In restricting the use of the jury trials, the bill has seen some controversy. In a criticism of the bill in parliament, Conservative MP, Geoffrey Cox, argued "It is the jury that protects us from the allegation that the state is deciding upon that citizen’s future. That is what protects, preserves and enhances the reputation of the administration of justice."
