= George Finch (councillor) =

British politician (born 2006)

Cllr George Finch
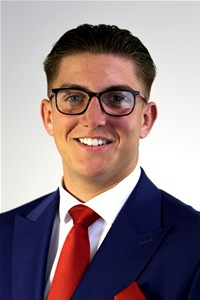
- Official portrait, 2025

Leader of Warwickshire County Council
- Incumbent
- Assumed office 22 July 2025 (Note: Acting leader 19 June 2025-22 July 2025)
- Deputy: Stephen Shaw
- Preceded by: Rob Howard

Leader of Nuneaton and Bedworth Borough Council
- Incumbent
- Assumed office 20 May 2026
- Preceded by: Steve Hey

Portfolio Holder for Children & Families
- Incumbent
- Assumed office 16 May 2025
- Council: Warwickshire County Council
- Preceded by: Sue Markham

Deputy Leader of Warwickshire County Council
- In office 16 May 2025 – 22 July 2025
- Leader: Rob Howard
- Preceded by: Peter Butlin
- Succeeded by: Stephen Shaw

Member of Warwickshire County Council
- Incumbent
- Assumed office 6 May 2025
- Division: Bedworth Central
- Preceded by: Brian Hammersley

Member of Nuneaton and Bedworth Borough Council
- Incumbent
- Assumed office 7 May 2026
- Ward: Bede
- Preceded by: Anne-Marie Bull

Personal details
- Born: July 2006 (age 20)
- Party: Reform UK (since 2024)
- Other political affiliations: Conservative (2024)
- Education: Ash Green School
- Occupation: Politician

George Finch (born July 2006) is a British politician who has served as leader of Warwickshire County Council since July 2025 and as leader of Nuneaton and Bedworth Borough Council since 20 May 2026.

He is the youngest council leader ever in British history, taking permanent office on 22 July 2025 at the age of 19.

On the 20 May 2026, Finch also became the first council leader in British history to lead two councils simultaneously.

== Education and early life ==
Finch was educated at Higham Lane School in Nuneaton. Prior to his role as a councillor, Finch was a youth councillor for Nuneaton and Bedworth, and served as associate editor for the New Reformer website. He had been planning to attend university in order to study history, with a view to becoming a history teacher, but decided not to do so because he did not like the curriculum and believed universities and colleges to be "a conveyor belt for socialist wokeism".

== Political career ==
Finch was a member of the Conservative Party prior to the 2024 general election, but has variously said he was "kicked out" of the party and that he left because he felt frustrated because he saw "no traction in the way to stop illegal immigration". He has said he was encouraged to join Reform following a visit to Nuneaton by Reform MP Lee Anderson. After joining Reform, he was first elected as a councillor for the Bedworth Central ward in the 2025 Warwickshire County Council election. Reform went from having no councillors before the election to being the largest party after the election, albeit falling short of an overall majority. He was selected as deputy leader of the council on 16 May 2025, with fellow Reform councillor Rob Howard being selected as leader.

On 25 June 2025, Howard resigned as council leader for health reasons, leading to the then-18-year-old Finch serving as interim leader. He was confirmed as permanent leader on 22 July after Conservative councillors abstained, leading to a tie that was resolved by the council chairman and Reform member, Edward Harris. Finch's election as council leader put him in charge of a local authority with £1.5bn worth of assets and an annual budget of £500m, and faced criticism from opposition politicians due to his age and lack of experience. Finch has dismissed his critics as "ageist" and "not relevant".

One of his first acts as leader was to oversee a vote on a proposal to hire political advisers, at a cost of £150,000, something that was criticised by opposition politicians as a waste of public funds. The proposal was narrowly passed by councillors. In August 2025, he published a letter on social media where he accused Warwickshire Police of covering up that the suspects of an alleged rape were asylum seekers, risking a charge of contempt of court. It was later revealed that the two men were Afghan asylum seekers living in a local house in multiple occupation. Yvette Cooper, the Home Secretary, also appealed for the police to be more transparent in cases such as this.

Following his election as council leader, Finch embroiled himself in a disagreement with the council's chief executive, Monica Fogarty, over the flying of a Pride Progress flag outside the council building. He asked for the flag to be removed, but Fogarty rejected his request. This prompted Reform's leader, Nigel Farage, to suggest it was time she "looked for another job". At a meeting on 4 September, Finch's cabinet voted to strip the chief executive of responsibility for deciding what flags can be flown outside its building, and handed the decision to the council's chairman. On 25 September, Judy Falp, a fellow Warwickshire councillor, told a council meeting the "matter was handled very badly", particularly as Finch had chosen not to support the chief executive.

In September 2025 he addressed an event at his party's annual conference titled "The lost boys: a response to the crisis facing young men", held in Birmingham, where he describing sixth form education as a "complete joke" that helps teenagers to develop a "woke mindset", and called for the teaching of subjects such as engineering and design technology.

In a Daily Mail article published on 13 October 2025, Finch alleged he was called a "racist" and a "fascist" and assaulted during a confrontation a few days earlier in Nuneaton, and blamed what he called "the dangerous rhetoric of Labour and the Greens" for the incident.

In October 2025, Finch wrote to Bridget Phillipson, the Secretary of State for Education, seeking permission to launch a review of the rules governing pupils' eligibility for home to school transport in Warwickshire, arguing that allowing local authorities to set the criteria for eligibility could save money. Phillipson criticised the move as an attempt to take "children back to the Victorian era" when it emerged that a review could see children as young as eight having to walk up to five miles a day to and from school. Finch subsequently accused Phillipson of using his letter as a "political football" to attack both him and Warwickshire County Council, telling BBC CWR: "People have said I want to increase [the statutory distance] to five miles. I don't. I never said I want to. All I did was send a letter to the Secretary of State asking for more devolved powers.".

On 19 February 2026, Finch expelled councillors Scott Cameron and Luke Cooper from the Reform UK group amid accusations they were about to defect to Restore Britain, a party that had been launched by former Reform MP Rupert Lowe a few days earlier.

On 9 March, Warwickshire County Council's Green Party members asked for a vote of no confidence in Finch after accusing him of bringing the authority "into disrepute" and "[abusing] the office of leader". Finch dismissed the attempt as a "political stunt". On 17 March, Finch survived the vote of no confidence by one vote after Warwickshire County Councillors voted 27–26 against the motion. Speaking after the vote, Finch said he did not want to "waste any more time" discussing it.

On 16 March, Finch announced he would stand as a candidate in the 2026 Nuneaton and Bedworth Borough Council election for the Bede ward. He won his seat by a substantial margin. On 20 May, he was elected as leader of Nuneaton and Bedworth Borough Council.

In July 2026, Reform attempted to reverse Warwickshire County Council's 2020 declaration of a climate emergency, but their motion was defeated at a council meeting on 21 July with the help of the Conservatives. Finch received laughs of derision from the chamber when he described flooding in Nuneaton's River Anker as being an "Act of God" rather than a consequence of climate change. At a meeting later in July, Nicki Scott, a Green councillor, raised concerns about bullying at Warwickshire County Council, claiming that officers were reporting weekly concerns about harassment under the Reform UK administration, and accused Finch of creating a culture of fear. Finch rejected the allegations as "untrue" and said opposition rhetoric was fuelling a false narrative.

== Code of conduct investigations ==
In 2025, Finch was the subject of three separate code of conduct investigations relating to his social media posts and public comments. In one instance, a complaint was made concerning a video posted on social media which referred to the then leader of Nuneaton and Bedworth Borough Council. Another complaint related to images depicting local councillors, and a third complaint was filed with the council’s monitoring officer regarding the tone and content of additional online material. According to reporting by WarwickshireWorld, the matters were under consideration by the monitoring officer at Warwickshire County Council, and Finch stated that he stood by his previous comments and described at least one post as being intended as a joke. In June 2026, a code of conduct hearing cleared Finch of any wrongdoing over the comments he made about the rape case.

In June 2026, it was reported that Warwickshire Pride had submitted a code of conduct complaint against Finch after he said that books containing "contested gender ideology" should be removed from libraries in Warwickshire, and that a new policy would be developed on the issue. Finch had claimed that he had received "a number" of complaints about the topic but a Freedom of Information request revealed zero complaints had been made about books inappropriate for children in Warwickshire libraries since at least March 2024.

== Personal life ==
Finch lives in Nuneaton. His father, Stuart Finch, was a carpenter, but gave up work after developing sepsis, and became unemployed, while their mother continued working as a teaching assistant. However, in 2026, Stuart Finch stood in the Nuneaton and Bedworth Borough Council elections, claiming "new treatments" now enabled him to be fit for work.

Finch has played rugby union since the age of four, something he says has given him "great team-building skills and leadership skills".
