= Hillsborough Law =

Proposed British legislation for a duty of candour

Public Office (Accountability) Bill
- Bill
- Parliament of the United Kingdom
- Long title: A Bill to Impose a duty on public authorities and public officials to act with candour, transparency and frankness; to make provision for the enforcement of that duty in their dealings with inquiries and investigations; to require public authorities to promote and take steps to maintain ethical conduct within all parts of the authority; to create an offence in relation to public authorities and public officials who mislead the public; to create further offences in relation to the misconduct of persons who hold public office and to abolish the common law offence of misconduct in public office; to make provision enabling persons to participate at inquiries and investigations where the conduct of public authorities may be in issue; and for connected purposes.
- Citation: Bill 306 2024–26
- Introduced by: David Lammy, Lord Chancellor (Commons); Lord Levitt (Lords)

Status: Pending

The Hillsborough Law, known officially as the Public Office (Accountability) Bill is a proposed piece of legislation which would impose a duty on public authorities and officials to act with candour, transparency and frankness and establish offences to prosecute those who mislead the public or engage in misconduct relating to their duties as public officials. In July 2026, the bill was approved by the House of Commons and will be scrutinised by the House of Lords before becoming law.

== Overview of bill ==
In its current form, the Public Office (Accountability) Bill would:

- Create a statutory "duty of candour and assistance" (a legal obligation to act transparently) for public authorities and officials when engaging with inquiries, inquests and similar investigations.
- Create a framework to ensure ethical conduct in public authorities including mandatory codes of conduct.
- Create new criminal offences of failing to uphold the duty of candour and assistance and misleading the public.
- Create two new statutory offences to replace the common law offence of misconduct in public office.
- Introduce "parity of representation" for bereaved families at inquests involving public authorities.

== History ==
=== Hillsborough disaster and early campaigns (1989 to the 2010s) ===
In the aftermath of the Hillsborough disaster in 1989 and the resulting investigations over subsequent decades, grieving families of the 97 individuals who died called for a duty of candour, forcing public officials to tell the truth. Not only was the disaster in Hillsborough caused by police inaction and misconduct, but a campaign of covering up information, falsifying records and slandering in particular football fans of Liverpool Football Club in attendance, led families of the victims to campaign for a duty of candour, that an event and the subsequent ordeal to get the truth out would never happen again.

Pete Weatherby KC, who represented the families of the 96 through the Hillsborough Inquiry, believed that not only a duty of candour was needed, but also a duty to assist: to force officials to proactively supply information to inquiries. The families also had to raise funds totalling £63 million, which was eventually partially funded by the Home Office through a unique fund. The authorities had access to state-funded legal representation throughout court cases and inquiries, Weatherby's argument being that there is an imbalance for those pleading injustice against the state, with its effectively limitless funds to pay for legal representation. Weatherby, along with other barristers who represented family members of the 96, penned a draft of the Public Office (Accountability) Bill, which enshrined the full duty of candour and equal funding. The bill was brought to parliament in 2017 as a private member's bill by MP Andy Burnham and had cross-party support, but it did not reach its second reading before the 2017 general election, after which Burnham left the Commons; subsequent Conservative governments did not pick the legislation up again.

=== More injustices, mounting pressure (2010s and 20s) ===
The late 2010s and early 2020s saw a number of scandals and injustices involving public institutions and officials; particularly the Post Office scandal which saw hundreds of innocent subpostmasters privately prosecuted by the Post Office between 1999 and 2015 for theft, that turned out to be a software fault; the Grenfell Tower fire in 2017, which led to the deaths of 72 residents, caused by substandard cladding. Others include the Infected blood scandal and the Nuclear test veterans scandal, all of which have had campaigns for compensation to victims.

A duty of candour bill was announced in the 2024 King's Speech following the Labour Party's general election victory, later clarified in the transcript of the speech as a Hillsborough Law.

In July 2025 Ian Byrne, MP for Liverpool West Derby, attempted to reintroduce the original 2017 bill, introduced by Burnham, to parliament, due to fears that the duty of candour element of the original bill had been removed. This attempt was blocked by the government, who are said to want to draft their own version of the bill.

Amendments to the bill, particularly relating to how the bill would effect the security services, have been tabled, causing progress to stall. The government issued a carry-over motion, allowing work on the bill to be continued into the second session of the current parliament. Bryne expressed his urgent belief that 'ministers must end the delays and deliver the law in full without carve outs', a sentiment echoed by campaigners including Margaret Aspinall.

== Parliamentary progress ==
=== House of Commons ===
==== First reading ====
The bill had its first reading on 16 September 2025.

==== Second reading ====
Keir Starmer introduced the bill for its second reading. The bill was debated in the Commons on 3 November 2025 and passed to committee stage.

==== Committee stage ====
The bill was in from 27 November 2025 to 14 July 2026. Witnesses include Weatherby, now working with the Hillsborough Law Now campaign, Burnham and Steve Rotheram, Mayor of Liverpool City Region.

==== Report stage ====
Having been carried-over to the second session of the 2024-present parliament, the bill progressed slowly through the report stage. A total of 159 amendments were tabled. An amendment was put forward by Liberal Democrat MP Jess Brown-Fuller which would introduce an offence of "wilfully destroying information or records relevant to an inquiry or investigation"; A further amendment tabled by Labour MP Luke Myer would "[expand] the offence of misleading the public to apply to Members of either House of Parliament",, which received cross-party support.

In January 2026, the government shelved a planned final debate on the bill amid controversy over a government-introduced amendment to make co-operation from intelligence services personnel contingent on approval from the head of their service, with oversight from the Intelligence and Security Committee. This led to a pushback from the Intelligence and Security Committee, which did not support the amendment, and from multiple Labour MPs, including Ian Byrne, who tabled his own amendment which would "remove the exemption for a person who works for an intelligence service to notify an inquiry or investigation of relevant acts or information".. Amid the deadlock, BBC News reported that the director general of MI5, Sir Ken McCallum, "was personally involved in speaking to some MPs" to resolve the issue.

==== Third reading ====
Keir Starmer introduced the bill for its third reading. The bill was debated in the Commons on 14 July 2026 and passed to the House of Lords.

==== Final stages ====
In July 2026, the bill was approved by the House of Commons and is due to be further scrutinised by the House of Lords. The government hopes the law will be in effect by April 2027, in time for the anniversary of the Hillsborough disaster. The bill was passed with MP Andy Burnham present as one of the final acts of the Keir Starmer premiership. Both had been involved in the original drafting of the bill.

=== House of Lords ===
==== First reading ====
After being carried over till 29 January 2027, the bill was first read in the House of Lords on 16 July 2026.

==== Second reading ====
Lord Lemos introduced the bill for its second reading. The bill was debated in the Commons on 1 September 2026 and passed to committee stage.
