= Warwickshire County Council elections =

Local government elections in Warwickshire, England

Warwickshire County Council elections are held every four years. Warwickshire County Council is the upper-tier authority for the non-metropolitan county of Warwickshire in England. Since the last boundary changes in 2017, 57 councillors have been elected from 57 electoral divisions.

== Council elections ==
Summary of the council composition after each election; click on the year for full details of each election.

Year	Conservative	Labour	Liberal Democrats (Note: Includes totals for the predecessors of the Liberal Democrats, the Liberal Party and SDP (both of which participated in the Alliance).)	Reform	Green	Independents & Others (Note: Includes Residents Associations)	Council control after election
Local government reorganisation; council established (55 seats)
1973	27	21	5	–	–	1	No overall control
1977	43	10	0	–	0	2	Conservative
New division boundaries; seats increased from 55 to 62
1981	30	27	3	–	0	2	No overall control
1985	26	24	10	–	0	2	No overall control
1989	32	24	4	–	0	2	Conservative
1993	19	30	10	–	0	3	No overall control
1997	22	31	8	–	0	1	No overall control
2001	20	28	13	–	0	1	No overall control
New division boundaries
2005	27	23	7	–	0	1	No overall control
2009	39	10	12	–	0	1	Conservative
2013	26	22	9	–	2	3	No overall control
New division boundaries
2017	36	10	7	–	2	2	Conservative
2021	42	6	5	0	3	1	Conservative
2025	9	3	14	23	7	1	No overall control

== Results maps ==
2005 results map

2009 results map

2013 results map

2017 results map

2021 results map

2025 results map

== By-election results ==
=== 1997–2001 ===
Rugby Hillmorton By-Election 7 May 1998
Party	Candidate	Votes	%	±%
Labour		1,011	43.1	−6.9
Conservative		741	33.1	+6.0
Liberal Democrats		489	21.8	+0.9
Majority		270	10.0	
Turnout		2,241		
Labour hold		Swing		

=== 2005–2009 ===
Wellesbourne By-Election 20 July 2006
Party	Candidate	Votes	%	±%
Conservative	Laura Main	1,112	52.6	+3.0
Liberal Democrats	David Johnston	776	36.7	−6.0
Labour	John Ritchie	227	10.7	+10.7
Majority		336	15.9	
Turnout		2,115	35.6	
Conservative hold		Swing		

Lawford and New Bilton By-Election 6 March 2008
Party	Candidate	Votes	%	±%
Labour	Douglas Hodkinson	724	33.8	−7.9
Conservative	Jane Watson	723	33.7	+4.7
BNP	George Jones	313	14.6	+14.6
Liberal Democrats	Diane Pask	235	11.0	−3.3
Green	Philip Godden	148	6.9	+6.9
Majority		1	0.1	
Turnout		2,143	28.9	
Labour hold		Swing		

=== 2009–2013 ===
Arbury and Stockingford By-Election 16 July 2009
Party	Candidate	Votes	%	±%
Labour	Barry Longden	1,331	41.7	+13.5
Conservative	Tom Wilson	1,079	33.8	+2.6
BNP	Martyn Findley	449	14.1	−10.4
Green	Michael Wright	170	5.3	−10.8
Liberal Democrats	Alice Field	118	3.7	+3.7
Socialist Alternative	Steven Gee	43	1.3	+1.3
Majority		252	7.9	
Turnout		3,190	21.4	
Labour gain from Conservative		Swing		

Nuneaton St Nicholas By-Election 6 May 2010
Party	Candidate	Votes	%	±%
Conservative	Jeffrey Clarke	3,195	56.3	−8.5
Labour	Paul Hickling	1,616	28.5	+9.0
Green	Keith Kondakor	589	10.4	−5.4
Independent	Thomas Wilson	280	4.9	+4.9
Majority		1,579	27.8	
Turnout		5,680		
Conservative hold		Swing		

Studley By-Election 6 May 2010
Party	Candidate	Votes	%	±%
Liberal Democrats	Clive Rickhards	1,906	44.6	−1.2
Conservative	Justin Kerridge	1,755	41.1	−1.5
Labour	Jacqueline Abbott	480	11.2	+6.4
Green	Karen Varga	128	3.0	−3.7
Majority		151	3.5	
Turnout		4,269	70.3	
Liberal Democrats hold		Swing		

=== 2013-2017 ===
Bedworth West by-election, 12 December 2013
Party	Candidate	Votes	%	±%
Labour	Brian Hawkes	904	62.56	
Conservative	Janet Batterbee	353	24.42	
UKIP	Andrew Hutchings	142	9.82	
TUSC	Natara Hunter	46	3.18	
Majority		551	38.13	
Turnout		1,445	16.94	

Hartshill Ward by-election, 22 May 2014
Party	Candidate	Votes	%	±%
Labour	Chris Clark	738	32.9	−2.0
UKIP	Bella Wayte	699	31.2	−2.3
Conservative	David Wright	616	27.5	−1.2
Independent	Carol Fox	190	8.5	+8.5
Majority		39	1.7	
Turnout		2,243		
Labour hold		Swing		

Nuneaton Whitestone Ward by-election, 13 August 2015
Party	Candidate	Votes	%	±%
Conservative	Jeff Morgan	1,281	58.4	+5.5
Labour	Andrew Crichton	503	22.9	−8.5
UKIP	Alwyn Waine	292	13.3	+13.3
Green	Mick Ludford	119	5.4	−10.3
Majority		778	35.4	
Turnout		2,195		
Conservative hold		Swing		

=== 2017-2021 ===
Leamington Willes by-election, 3 May 2018
Party	Candidate	Votes	%	±%
Labour	Helen Adkins	1,164	44.7	−1.2
Green	Martin Luckhurst	1139	43.7	+9.0
Conservative	Stacey Calder	266	10.2	−5.7
Liberal Democrats	George Begg	36	1.4	−2.1
Majority		25	1.0	
Turnout		2,605		
Labour hold		Swing		

Stratford North by-election, 29 November 2018
Party	Candidate	Votes	%	±%
Liberal Democrats	Dominic Skinner	877	40.7	+16.3
Conservative	Lynda Organ	610	28.3	−0.1
Stratford First Independent	Juliet Short	345	16.0	−17.1
Labour	Joshua Payne	180	8.3	−0.9
Green	John Riley	144	6.7	+1.5
Majority		267	12.4	
Turnout		2,156		
Liberal Democrats gain from Stratford First Independent		Swing		

=== 2021–2025 ===
Arden by-election, 14 July 2022
Party	Candidate	Votes	%	±%
Conservative	Ian Shenton	1,609	59.3	−14.7
Liberal Democrats	Thom Holmes	854	31.5	+24.3
Labour	Bryn Turner	251	9.2	−0.8
Majority		755	27.7	
Turnout		2,712		
Conservative hold		Swing		

Dunsmore and Leam Valley by-election, 14 December 2023
Party	Candidate	Votes	%	±%
Conservative	Dale Keeling	911	42.8	−23.0
Liberal Democrats	Stephen Pimm	649	30.5	+23.6
Labour	Alison Livesey	350	16.4	−2.5
Green	Helen Ford	219	10.3	+1.9
Majority		262	12.3	
Turnout		2,129		
Conservative hold		Swing		
