= 2021 Warwickshire County Council election =

Warwickshire County Council election

← 2017	6 May 2021	2025 →

All 57 seats to Warwickshire County Council 29 seats needed for a majority
	First party	Second party
Party	Conservative	Labour
Last election	36	10
Seats before	33	7
Seats won	42	6
Seat change	▲6	▼4
	Third party	Fourth party
Party	Liberal Democrats	Green
Last election	7	2
Seats before	8	2
Seats won	5	3
Seat change	▼2	▲1
- Map showing the results of the 2021 Warwickshire County Council election

- Composition of the council after the election
Council control before election
Conservative Party
Council control after election
Conservative Party

The 2021 Warwickshire County Council election was held on 6 May 2021 alongside other local elections across England. All 57 seats on Warwickshire County Council were contested returning one councillor for each division by first-past-the-post voting for a four-year term in office. The electoral divisions were the same as those used at the previous election held in 2017.

== Previous council composition ==
After 2017 election		Before 2021 election	
Party	Seats	Party	Seats
Conservative	36	Conservative	33
Labour	10	Labour	7
Liberal Democrats	7	Liberal Democrats	8
Green	2	Green	2
Whitnash Residents	1	Whitnash Residents	1
Independent	1	Independent	3
Vacant	0	Vacant	3

== Summary ==
=== Election result ===
2021 Warwickshire County Council election
Party	Candidates	Seats	Gains	Losses	Net gain/loss	Seats %	Votes %	Votes	+/−
Conservative	57	42	8	2	▲6	73.7	48.6	82,051	–0.7
Labour	57	6	2	6	▼4	10.5	21.5	36,276	–2.1
Liberal Democrats	38	5	0	3	▼3	8.8	15.3	25,822	–0.7
Green	53	3	2	1	▲1	5.3	12.6	21,255	+5.1
Whitnash Residents	1	1	0	0	Steady	1.8	0.7	1,160	±0.0
Independent	9	0	0	0	Steady	0.0	0.9	1,562	+0.4
SDP	5	0	0	0	Steady	0.0	0.2	257	N/A
TUSC	3	0	0	0	Steady	0.0	0.1	182	±0.0
Reform UK	2	0	0	0	Steady	0.0	0.1	166	N/A
UKIP	2	0	0	0	Steady	0.0	0.1	112	–1.6
Volt	1	0	0	0	Steady	0.0	<0.1	63	N/A
Libertarian	1	0	0	0	Steady	0.0	<0.1	53	N/A

== Results by district ==
=== North Warwickshire ===
North Warwickshire district summary
Party	Seats	+/-	Votes	%	+/-
Conservative	7	▲2	10,301	65.6	+10.3
Labour	0	▼2	4,447	28.3	–7.9
Green	0	Steady	849	5.4	+1.9
Liberal Democrats	0	Steady	112	0.7	N/A
Total	7	Steady	15,709		

Division results

Atherstone
Party	Candidate	Votes	%	±%
Conservative	Mejar Singh	1,143	58.59	+18.4
Labour Co-op	Neil Dirveiks	688	35.26	−5.7
Green	Luke Haslam	120	6.15	+2.8
Majority		455	23.32	
Turnout		1,951		
Conservative gain from Labour		Swing		

Baddesley and Dordon
Party	Candidate	Votes	%	±%
Conservative	Andy Wright	1,658	72.7	+17.2
Labour	Smita Jalaf	622	27.3	−14.1
Majority				
Turnout				
Conservative hold		Swing		

Coleshill North and Water Orton
Party	Candidate	Votes	%	±%
Conservative	Martin Watson	1,382	67.5	+5.0
Labour	Abi Olaifa	464	22.7	−12.2
Green	Peggy Wright	201	9.8	+7.2
Majority				
Turnout				
Conservative hold		Swing		

Coleshill South and Arley
Party	Candidate	Votes	%	±%
Conservative	Dave Humphreys	1,550	62.3	−5.7
Labour Co-op	Jodie Gosling	680	27.3	−0.1
Green	Max Wilson	145	5.8	+1.2
Liberal Democrats	Tony Hayden	112	4.5	N/A
Majority				
Turnout				
Conservative hold		Swing		

Hartshill and Mancetter
Party	Candidate	Votes	%	±%
Conservative	Margaret Bell	1,470	66.2	+14.2
Labour	Bob Copeland	554	24.9	−11.2
Green	Joshua Smith	198	8.9	+5.3
Majority				
Turnout				
Conservative hold		Swing		

Kingsbury
Party	Candidate	Votes	%	±%
Conservative	Andy Jenns	1,947	80.6	+21.8
Labour	Simon Greenaway	468	19.4	−5.0
Majority				
Turnout				
Conservative hold		Swing		

Polesworth
Party	Candidate	Votes	%	±%
Conservative	Marian Humphreys	1,151	49.9	+4.6
Labour Co-op	Dave Parsons	971	42.1	−8.2
Green	Jill Chapman	185	8.0	+3.6
Majority				
Turnout				
Conservative gain from Labour		Swing		

=== Nuneaton and Bedworth ===
Nuneaton & Bedworth district summary
Party	Seats	+/-	Votes	%	+/-
Conservative	12	▲4	18,987	57.0	+6.9
Labour	1	▼3	8,506	25.5	–9.8
Green	0	▼1	4,515	13.5	+1.6
Independent	0	Steady	1,048	3.1	+2.6
TUSC	0	Steady	182	0.5	N/A
Reform UK	0	Steady	54	0.2	N/A
Liberal Democrats	0	Steady	34	0.1	N/A
Total	13	Steady	33,326		

Division results

Arbury
Party	Candidate	Votes	%	±%
Conservative	Clare Golby	1,447	63.6	+6.2
Labour Co-op	Joe Bevan	615	27.0	−8.9
Green	Maggie Morrissey	138	6.1	−0.6
Independent	Katrina Slomczynski	41	1.8	N/A
Liberal Democrats	Joy Salaja	34	1.5	N/A
Majority		832	36.6	+21.5
Turnout		2,275		
Conservative hold		Swing		

Attleborough
Party	Candidate	Votes	%	±%
Conservative	Richard Baxter-Payne	1,042	44.2	−4.8
Independent	Andy Sargeant	643	27.3	−21.7
Labour	Stephen Hey	474	20.1	−23.1
Green	Laurel Brindley	154	6.5	−1.4
Reform UK	Rob Howard	45	1.9	N/A
Majority		399	16.9	
Turnout		2,358		
Conservative hold		Swing		

Bedworth Central
Party	Candidate	Votes	%	±%
Conservative	Brian Hammersley	1,413	66.2	+27.9
Labour	Julie Jackson	722	33.8	−17.1
Majority		691	32.4	
Turnout		2,135		
Conservative gain from Labour		Swing		

Bedworth East
Party	Candidate	Votes	%	±%
Conservative	Bhagwant Pandher	1,378	62.4	+16.8
Labour	Helen Sinclair	673	30.5	−12.2
Green	Alice Twyman	159	7.2	+3.5
Majority		705	31.9	
Turnout		2,210		
Conservative hold		Swing		

Bedworth North
Party	Candidate	Votes	%	±%
Conservative	Sue Markham	1,442	63.1	−1.1
Labour	Bill Hancock	660	28.9	−2.8
Green	Ian Morrissey	136	5.9	+1.7
TUSC	Max McGee	49	2.1	N/A
Majority		782	34.9	
Turnout		2,287		
Conservative hold		Swing		

Bedworth West
Party	Candidate	Votes	%	±%
Conservative	Pete Gilbert	1,438	60.8	+11.5
Labour	Ian Lloyd	704	29.8	−10.7
Green	Merle Gering	149	6.3	+1.8
TUSC	Eileen Hunter	75	3.2	N/A
Majority		734	31.0	
Turnout		2,366		
Conservative hold		Swing		

Bulkington & Whitestone
Party	Candidate	Votes	%	±%
Conservative	Jeff Morgan	2,632	75.2	+4.0
Labour	Alan Lewis	619	17.7	−5.9
Green	Mike Wright	248	7.1	+1.9
Majority		2,013	57.5	
Turnout		3,499		
Conservative hold		Swing		

Camp Hill
Party	Candidate	Votes	%	±%
Conservative	Brett Beetham	961	54.1	+23.4
Labour	Jill Sheppard	561	31.6	−15.6
Green	Laura Hulme	195	11.0	+1.7
TUSC	Paul Reilly	58	3.3	N/A
Majority		400	22.5	
Turnout		1,775		
Conservative gain from Labour		Swing		

Galley Common
Party	Candidate	Votes	%	±%
Conservative	Mandy Tromans	1,406	59.5	+2.6
Labour	Chris Watkins	757	32.0	+1.4
Green	Spring Vernon	199	8.4	+3.2
Majority		649	27.48	
Turnout		2,362		
Conservative hold		Swing		

Nuneaton Abbey
Party	Candidate	Votes	%	±%
Labour	Caroline Phillips	1,196	50.9	−16.3
Conservative	Scott Harbison	805	34.2	+10.3
Green	Sophie Bonner	219	9.3	+0.8
Independent	Kieran Grant	66	2.8	N/A
No Description	J B Webb-Benjamin	66	2.8	N/A
Majority		391	16.6	
Turnout		2,352		
Labour hold		Swing		

Nuneaton East
Party	Candidate	Votes	%	±%
Conservative	Jeffery Clarke	2,114	57.9	−5.5
Green	Michele Kondakor	973	26.7	+5.6
Labour	Neil Phillips	407	11.2	−4.0
Independent	Jayne Sargeant	155	4.2	N/A
Majority		1,141	31.3	
Turnout		3,649		
Conservative hold		Swing		

Stockingford
Party	Candidate	Votes	%	±%
Conservative	Jack Kennaugh	1,132	53.8	+12.7
Labour	Fatma Bibi	718	34.1	−16.3
Green	Tess Brookes	178	8.5	−0.1
Independent	Alan Baxter	77	3.7	N/A
Majority		414	19.7	
Turnout		2,105		
Conservative gain from Labour		Swing		

Weddington
Party	Candidate	Votes	%	±%
Conservative	Robert Tromans	1,777	45.1	+2.6
Green	Keith Kondakor	1,767	44.8	−1.5
Labour	Brian Walmsley	400	10.1	−1.1
Majority		10	0.3	
Turnout		3,944		
Conservative gain from Green		Swing		

=== Rugby ===
Rugby district summary
Party	Seats	+/-	Votes	%	+/-
Conservative	7	Steady	14,789	49.6	–2.0
Labour	2	Steady	7,796	26.1	+0.7
Liberal Democrats	1	Steady	4,687	15.7	–1.0
Green	0	Steady	2,505	8.4	+3.7
Libertarian	0	Steady	53	0.2	N/A
Total	10	Steady	29,830		

Division results

Admirals & Cawston
Party	Candidate	Votes	%	±%
Conservative	Peter Butlin	1,577	51.0	−1.1
Labour	Ish Mistry	965	31.2	+0.8
Liberal Democrats	Lee Chase	344	11.1	+2.7
Green	Kate Crowley	209	6.8	+3.0
Majority				
Turnout				
Conservative hold		Swing		

Benn
Party	Candidate	Votes	%	±%
Labour	Sarah Feeney	1,116	48.4	−5.7
Conservative	Dave Cranham	684	29.7	+4.0
Green	Becca Stevenson	326	14.1	+7.1
Liberal Democrats	Hugh Trimble	180	7.8	−1.9
Majority				
Turnout				
Labour hold		Swing		

Bilton & Hillside
Party	Candidate	Votes	%	±%
Conservative	Kam Kaur	1,680	45.9	−3.3
Liberal Democrats	Stephen Pimm	1,215	33.2	−0.2
Labour	Phil Bates	555	15.2	+2.2
Green	Richard Brook	207	5.7	+1.3
Majority				
Turnout				
Conservative hold		Swing		

Brownsover & Coton Park
Party	Candidate	Votes	%	±%
Conservative	Jill Simpson-Vince	1,321	49.1	+1.8
Labour	Jim Ellis	1,008	37.5	−0.2
Green	Carrie Pailthorpe	165	6.1	−1.1
Liberal Democrats	Edward Blackburn	142	5.3	−2.5
Libertarian	Jamie Pullin	53	2.0	N/A
Majority				
Turnout				
Conservative hold		Swing		

Dunsmore & Leam Valley
Party	Candidate	Votes	%	±%
Conservative	Howard Roberts	1,990	65.8	−9.3
Labour	Bob Hughes	571	18.9	+6.5
Green	Roy Sandison	255	8.4	+4.3
Liberal Democrats	Lesley Kennedy-George	210	6.9	−1.5
Majority				
Turnout				
Conservative hold		Swing		

Earl Craven
Party	Candidate	Votes	%	±%
Conservative	Heather Timms	1,938	64.2	−1.9
Labour	Richard Harrington	633	21.0	−1.1
Green	Lesley Summers	447	14.8	+9.4
Majority				
Turnout				
Conservative hold		Swing		

Eastlands
Party	Candidate	Votes	%	±%
Liberal Democrats	Jerry Roodhouse	1,554	50.4	−3.6
Conservative	Heidi Thomas	827	26.8	+1.4
Labour	Mark Gore	522	16.9	−0.4
Green	Angie Dunne	178	5.8	+2.4
Majority				
Turnout				
Liberal Democrats hold		Swing		

Fosse
Party	Candidate	Votes	%	±%
Conservative	Adrian Warwick	2,404	63.5	−4.8
Labour	Kieran Brown	849	22.4	+2.9
Green	Mark Summers	305	8.1	+4.1
Liberal Democrats	Patricia Trimble	225	5.9	−2.2
Majority				
Turnout				
Conservative hold		Swing		

Hillmorton
Party	Candidate	Votes	%	±%
Conservative	Yousef Dahmash	1,615	55.1	−0.8
Labour	Sean Baulk	678	23.1	−2.3
Liberal Democrats	Noreen New	456	15.5	+0.8
Green	Bob Beggs	184	6.3	+2.3
Majority				
Turnout				
Conservative hold		Swing		

New Bilton & Overslade
Party	Candidate	Votes	%	±%
Labour	Barbara Brown	899	40.0	−5.9
Conservative	Sally Bragg	753	33.5	+1.3
Liberal Democrats	Neil Sandison	361	16.1	+1.1
Green	Maralyn Pickup	232	10.3	+5.3
Majority				
Turnout				
Labour hold		Swing		

=== Stratford-on-Avon ===
Stratford-on-Avon district summary
Party	Seats	+/-	Votes	%	+/-
Conservative	11	▲2	23,179	52.0	–2.6
Liberal Democrats	2	▼1	13,258	29.7	±0.0
Green	0	Steady	4,098	9.2	+4.8
Labour	0	Steady	3,914	8.8	+0.9
Reform UK	0	Steady	121	0.3	N/A
SDP	0	Steady	40	0.1	N/A
Independent	0	▼1	N/A	N/A	–2.2
Total	13	Steady	44,610		

Division results

Alcester
Party	Candidate	Votes	%	±%
Conservative	Piers Daniell	1,642	46.4	−8.8
Liberal Democrats	Susan Juned	1,356	38.3	+1.5
Labour	Jack Fildew	369	10.4	+5.6
Green	Sarah Elgin	173	4.9	+1.7
Majority				
Turnout				
Conservative hold		Swing		

Arden
Party	Candidate	Votes	%	±%
Conservative	John Horner	2,588	74.0	−7.6
Labour	Bryn Turner	350	10.0	N/A
Green	Penny Stott	311	8.9	+2.7
Liberal Democrats	Karyl Rees	250	7.1	−5.1
Majority				
Turnout				
Conservative hold		Swing		

Bidford & Welford
Party	Candidate	Votes	%	±%
Conservative	Daren Pemberton	2,016	50.4	−8.6
Liberal Democrats	Manuela Perteghella	1,335	33.4	+12.1
Labour	Cat Price	415	10.3	+0.5
Green	Tom Genders	230	5.8	+1.3
Majority				
Turnout				
Conservative hold		Swing		

Feldon
Party	Candidate	Votes	%	±%
Conservative	Christopher Kettle	2,016	55.8	−10.5
Liberal Democrats	Nick Solman	775	21.4	+6.2
Green	Richard Fowler	441	12.2	+6.1
Labour	David Robinson	376	10.4	−2.0
Majority				
Turnout				
Conservative hold		Swing		

Kineton & Red Horse
Party	Candidate	Votes	%	±%
Conservative	Chris Mills	2,180	66.6	+21.6
Green	Rob Ballantyne	368	11.2	+7.4
Labour	Jan Sewell	365	11.1	+5.2
Liberal Democrats	Elizabeth Greetham	360	11.0	−29.5
Majority				
Turnout				
Conservative hold		Swing		

Shipston
Party	Candidate	Votes	%	±%
Conservative	Jo Barker	1,765	49.2	−16.5
Green	Dave Passingham	1104	30.8	+25.1
Liberal Democrats	John Dinnie	540	15.0	−6.1
Labour	Kathrin Foster	174	4.8	−2.6
Majority				
Turnout				
Conservative hold		Swing		

Southam, Stockton & Napton
Party	Candidate	Votes	%	±%
Conservative	Andy Crump	2,633	74.9	+4.2
Labour	Bernadette Jenkins	435	12.3	−7.3
Liberal Democrats	David Booth	243	6.9	+2.1
Green	Zoë James	202	5.7	+0.8
Majority				
Turnout				
Conservative hold		Swing		

Stour and the Vale
Party	Candidate	Votes	%	±%
Conservative	Izzi Seccombe	1,687	52.5	−21.7
Liberal Democrats	David Cowcher	1,181	36.8	+25.7
Green	Elliot Wassell	189	5.9	−0.9
Labour Co-op	Alastair Nealon	153	4.7	−3.2
Majority		506	15.7	−47.4
Turnout		3,210	47.5	+7.0
Conservative hold		Swing		

Stratford North
Party	Candidate	Votes	%	±%
Conservative	Tim Sinclair	1,283	41.7	+13.3
Liberal Democrats	Cohl Warren-Howles	1,168	38.0	+13.8
Labour	Sam Scott	345	11.2	+2.0
Green	John Stott	276	8.9	+3.8
Majority				
Turnout				
Conservative gain from Stratford First		Swing		

Stratford South
Party	Candidate	Votes	%	±%
Liberal Democrats	Kate Rolfe	2,330	57.7	+5.9
Conservative	Marilyn Bates	1,165	28.8	−9.4
Labour	Alexander Monk	218	5.4	−1.5
Green	Steve Michaux	203	5.0	+1.8
Reform UK	James Crocker	121	2.9	N/A
Majority				
Turnout				
Liberal Democrats hold		Swing		

Stratford West
Party	Candidate	Votes	%	±%
Liberal Democrats	Jennifer Fradgley	1,607	56.5	−2.6
Conservative	Peter Richards	841	29.5	−1.7
Labour	Wayne Bates	205	7.2	+0.7
Green	Peter Pettifor	190	6.6	+3.4
Majority				
Turnout				
Liberal Democrats hold		Swing		

Studley
Party	Candidate	Votes	%	±%
Conservative	Justin Kerridge	1,367	48.1	+4.8
Liberal Democrats	Clive Rickhards	1,146	40.3	−3.9
Labour	Andrew Foster	191	6.7	−3.3
Green	Val Gaize	133	4.6	+2.1
Majority				
Turnout				
Conservative gain from Liberal Democrats		Swing		

Wellesbourne
Party	Candidate	Votes	%	±%
Conservative	Penny-Anne O'Donnell	1,996	55.4	+1.7
Liberal Democrats	David Johnston	967	26.8	−8.0
Labour	Bob Williams	318	8.8	+4.1
Green	Helen Mitchell	278	7.7	+4.5
SDP	Timothy Griffiths	40	1.1	N/A
Majority				
Turnout				
Conservative hold		Swing		

=== Warwick ===
Warwick district summary
Party	Seats	+/-	Votes	%	+/-
Conservative	5	▼2	14,795	32.5	–6.5
Labour	3	▲1	11,613	25.5	+2.6
Green	3	▲2	9,285	20.4	+9.9
Liberal Democrats	2	▼1	7,731	17.0	–5.2
Whitnash Residents	1	Steady	1,160	2.6	–0.2
Independent	0	Steady	514	1.1	+0.3
SDP	0	Steady	217	0.5	N/A
UKIP	0	Steady	112	0.2	–1.5
Volt	0	Steady	63	0.1	N/A
Total	14	Steady	45,490		

Division results

Budbrooke & Bishop's Tachbrook
Party	Candidate	Votes	%	±%
Conservative	Jan Matecki	2,197	55.0	−11.5
Labour	Kelly Box	970	24.3	+7.3
Green	Dominic Harrison	512	12.8	+7.8
Liberal Democrats	Gerry Jackson	313	7.8	−3.7
Majority		1227	30.7	
Turnout				
Conservative hold		Swing		

Cubbington & Leek Wootton
Party	Candidate	Votes	%	±%
Conservative	Wallace Redford	1,791	56.3	−6.0
Labour	John Roberts	647	20.4	+3.6
Green	Angela Smith	397	12.5	+2.6
Liberal Democrats	Nicola Lomas	281	8.8	−2.1
Volt	Luis Perdigao	63	2.0	N/A
Majority		1144	35.9	
Turnout				
Conservative hold		Swing		

Kenilworth Park Hill
Party	Candidate	Votes	%	±%
Green	Tracey Drew	1,983	55.3	+44.7
Conservative	Andy Metcalf	1,153	32.2	−20.9
Liberal Democrats	Samantha Cooke	225	6.3	−17.0
Labour	Jeremy Eastaugh	223	6.2	−6.8
Majority		830	23.1	
Turnout				
Green gain from Conservative		Swing		

Kenilworth St John's
Party	Candidate	Votes	%	±%
Conservative	Richard Spencer	1,513	40.4	−1.9
Liberal Democrats	Adrian Marsh	1,195	30.9	−8.5
Green	Wendy Edwards	504	13.5	+8.9
Labour	Jane Green	477	12.7	+1.9
SDP	Wayne Harris	57	1.5	N/A
Majority		318	9.5	
Turnout				
Conservative hold		Swing		

Lapworth & West Kenilworth
Party	Candidate	Votes	%	±%
Conservative	John Cooke	1,450	47.4	−12.9
Green	John Watson	606	19.8	+16.2
Independent	Sue Gallagher	411	13.4	N/A
Liberal Democrats	Rob Eason	309	10.1	−14.6
Labour	Nicholas Hoten	283	9.3	0.0
Majority		844	27.6	
Turnout				
Conservative hold		Swing		

Leamington Brunswick
Party	Candidate	Votes	%	±%
Green	Jonathan Chilvers	1,466	58.5	+3.2
Labour	Jojo Norris	683	27.2	−4.7
Conservative	Charlton Sayer	245	9.8	+0.2
Liberal Democrats	Perjit Aujla	72	2.9	−0.3
SDP	Dhesh Chehal	21	0.8	N/A
UK Voice	Benjamin Spann	21	0.8	N/A
Majority		783	31.3	
Turnout				
Green hold		Swing		

Leamington Clarendon
Party	Candidate	Votes	%	±%
Labour	Sarah Millar	1,388	42.0	+15.7
Liberal Democrats	Nicola Davies	814	24.6	−9.4
Conservative	Charlotte Earl	738	22.3	−9.9
Green	Ignaty Dyakov-Richmond	281	8.5	+3.8
Independent	Hafeez Ahmed	82	2.5	N/A
Majority		574	17.4	
Turnout				
Labour gain from Liberal Democrats		Swing		

Leamington Milverton
Party	Candidate	Votes	%	±%
Liberal Democrats	Bill Gifford	1,926	58.0	−0.8
Conservative	Luke Shortland	597	18.0	−7.9
Labour	Rosemary Dixon	576	17.3	+5.5
Green	Sally Duns	224	6.7	+3.2
Majority		1,329	40.0	
Turnout				
Liberal Democrats hold		Swing		

Leamington North
Party	Candidate	Votes	%	±%
Liberal Democrats	Sarah Boad	1,702	50.4	+6.6
Labour	Chris King	738	21.9	−6.2
Conservative	James Butler	631	18.7	−5.7
Green	Marcia Watson	261	7.7	+4.0
UKIP	Gerry Smith	43	1.3	N/A
Majority		964	28.5	
Turnout				
Liberal Democrats hold		Swing		

Leamington Willes
Party	Candidate	Votes	%	±%
Green	Will Roberts	1,670	54.7	+20.0
Labour	Helen Adkins	1,055	34.6	−11.3
Conservative	Bronwen Davies	281	9.2	−6.7
Liberal Democrats	Jo-Anne Kandola	46	1.5	−2.0
Majority		615	20.1	
Turnout				
Green gain from Labour		Swing		

Warwick North
Party	Candidate	Votes	%	±%
Labour	Jackie D'Arcy	1,339	47.1	+8.2
Conservative	Pam Williams	1,239	43.6	−1.5
Liberal Democrats	Rana Das-Gupta	157	5.5	−1.3
SDP	Josh Payne	105	3.7	N/A
Majority		100	3.5	
Turnout				
Labour gain from Conservative		Swing		

Warwick South
Party	Candidate	Votes	%	±%
Conservative	Parminder Singh Birdi	1,286	37.6	−12.2
Green	Kathleen Gorman	890	26.0	+19.1
Labour	Linda Hugl	715	20.9	+3.7
Liberal Democrats	Trevor Barr	493	14.4	−6.0
SDP	Christopher Burr	34	1.0	N/A
Majority		296	11.6	
Turnout				
Conservative hold		Swing		

Warwick West
Party	Candidate	Votes	%	±%
Labour	John Holland	1,852	51.6	+10.0
Conservative	Neale Murphy	1266	35.3	−6.2
Green	Paul Atkins	311	8.7	+5.1
Liberal Democrats	Mubarik Chowdry	159	4.4	−4.4
Majority		586	16.3	
Turnout				
Labour hold		Swing		

Whitnash
Party	Candidate	Votes	%	±%
Whitnash Residents	Judy Falp	1,160	46.0	−1.9
Labour	Pip Burley	667	26.4	+9.0
Conservative	David Norris	408	16.2	+5.7
Green	Sarah Richards	180	7.1	−2.0
UKIP	Laurie Steele	69	2.7	N/A
Liberal Democrats	Chris Walsh	39	1.5	−0.2
Majority		493	19.6	
Turnout				
Whitnash Residents hold		Swing		
