= 2025 Warwickshire County Council election =

2025 UK local government election

- 1 May 2025

All 57 seats in the Warwickshire County Council 29 seats needed for a majority

	First party	Second party	Third party
Leader	Rob Howard	Jerry Roodhouse	Izzi Seccombe
Party	Reform	Liberal Democrats	Conservative
Leader's seat	Attleborough	Eastlands	Stour and the Vale (lost)
Last election	0 seats, 0.1%	5 seats, 15.3%	42 seats, 48.6%
Seats before	0	5	41
Seats won	23	14	9
Seat change	▲23	▲9	▼32
Popular vote	48,790	27,985	40,400
Percentage	30.4%	17.5%	25.20%
Swing	▲30.3 pp	▲2.2 pp	▼23.4 pp
	Fourth party	Fifth party	Sixth party
Leader	Jonathan Chilvers	Sarah Feeney	Judy Falp
Party	Green	Labour	Whitnash Residents
Leader's seat	Leamington Brunswick	Benn	Whitnash
Last election	3 seats, 12.6%	6 seat, 21.5%	1 seat, 0.7%
Seats before	3	6	1
Seats won	7	3	1
Seat change	▲4	▼3	1
Popular vote	19,268	20,907	971
Percentage	12.0%	13.0%	0.6%
Swing	▼0.6 pp	▼8.5 pp	▼0.1 pp

- Composition of the council after the election
Leader before election
Izzi Seccombe
Conservative
Leader after election
Rob Howard
Reform

The 2025 Warwickshire County Council election took place on 1 May 2025 to elect members to Warwickshire County Council in Warwickshire, England. All 57 seats were elected. The election took place on the same day as other local elections in England. The council was under Conservative majority control prior to the election. The election saw the council go under no overall control, with Reform UK becoming the largest party.

== Background ==
At the 2021 election, the Conservatives won a majority of seats.

== Previous council composition ==
After 2021 election		Before 2025 election	
Party	Seats	Party	Seats
Conservative	42	Conservative	41
Labour	6	Labour	6
Liberal Democrats	5	Liberal Democrats	5
Green	3	Green	3
Whitnash Residents	1	Whitnash Residents	0
Independent	0	Independent	2

=== Changes 2021–2025 ===
- May 2022: John Horner (Conservative) dies – by-election held July 2022
- July 2022: Ian Shenton (Conservative) wins by-election
- November 2023: Howard Roberts (Conservative) resigns – by-election held December 2023
- December 2023: Dale Keeling (Conservative) wins by-election
- February 2025: Wallace Redford (Conservative) leaves party to sit as an independent
- Judy Falp (Whitnash Residents) leaves party to sit as an independent

== Summary ==
The council was under Conservative majority control prior to the election, led by Izzi Seccombe. The election saw the council go under no overall control; the Conservatives fell back to being only the third largest party, being overtaken by both Reform UK and the Liberal Democrats, and Seccombe lost her seat. There had been no Reform UK councillors prior to the election, but they emerged as the largest party, with 23 seats. They chose Rob Howard to be their new group leader, and he was formally appointed as the new leader of the council at the subsequent annual council meeting on 16 May 2025. (Howard resigned as leader just over a month later.)

=== Election result ===
2025 Warwickshire County Council election
Party	Candidates	Seats	Gains	Losses	Net gain/loss	Seats %	Votes %	Votes	+/−
Reform	57	23	23	0	▲23	40.4	30.44	48,790	+30.34
Liberal Democrats	57	14	9	0	▲9	24.6	17.46	27,985	+2.16
Conservative	57	9	0	32	▼32	15.7	25.20	40,400	-23.4
Green	47	7	4	0	▲4	12.3	12.02	19,268	-0.58
Labour	57	3	1	4	▼3	5.3	13.04	20,907	-8.46
Whitnash Residents	1	1	0	0	Steady	1.8	0.61	971	-0.1
TUSC	12	0	0	0	Steady		0.34	540	
Independent	6	0	0	0	Steady		0.73	1,173	
Freedom Alliance (UK)	1	0	0	0	Steady		0.02	40	
Heritage	1	0	0	0	Steady		0.03	55	
National Housing Party	1	0	0	0	Steady		0.02	33	
UKIP	1	0	0	0	Steady		0.02	32	
Workers Party	1	0	0	0	Steady		0.06	104	

== Results by district ==
=== North Warwickshire ===
North Warwickshire district summary
Party	Seats	+/-	Votes	%	+/-
Reform UK	7	▲7	7,791	46.6	N/A
Conservative	0	▼7	4,379	26.2	-39.4
Labour	0	Steady	2,700	16.2	-12.1
Independent	0	Steady	967	5.8	N/A
Liberal Democrats	0	Steady	530	3.2	2.5
Green	0	Steady	279	1.8	-3.6
Heritage Party	0	Steady	55	0.3	N/A
Total	7	Steady	16,701		

Division results

Atherstone
Party	Candidate	Votes	%	±%
Reform	Robert Gisbourne	956	43.5	New
Conservative	Mejar Singh*	683	31.1	▼27.5
Labour	Dawn Wilkinson	434	19.8	▼15.5
Green	Joshua Wickham-Young	86	3.9	▼2.2
Liberal Democrats	Rambir Khatkar	38	1.7	New
Majority		273	12.4	N/A
Turnout		2197		
Registered electors				
Reform gain from Conservative		Swing	▲35.5	

Baddesley & Dordon
Party	Candidate	Votes	%	±%
Reform	Edward Harris	1,192	45.5	New
Conservative	Andy Wright	796	30.4	▼42.3
Labour	Owen Phillips	549	21.0	▼6.3
Liberal Democrats	Richard Vos	83	3.2	New
Majority		396	15.1	N/A
Turnout		2620		
Registered electors				
Reform gain from Conservative		Swing	▲43.9	

Coleshill North & Water Orton
Party	Candidate	Votes	%	±%
Reform	Robert Aitkenhead	845	40.0	New
Independent	Steve Stuart	733	34.7	New
Conservative	Martin Watson*	298	14.1	▼53.4
Labour	Olwen Brown	150	7.1	▼15.6
Green	Peggy Wiseman	39	1.8	▼8.0
Liberal Democrats	Karyl Rees	28	1.3	New
Independent	Paul Hopkins	22	1.0	New
Majority		112	5.3	N/A
Turnout		2115		
Registered electors				
Reform gain from Conservative		Swing	▲46.7	

Coleshill South & Arley
Party	Candidate	Votes	%	±%
Reform	Scott Cameron	1,263	51.3	New
Conservative	Dave Humphreys*	635	25.8	▼36.5
Labour	Tony Short	338	13.7	▼13.6
Green	Margaret Hughes	154	6.3	▲0.5
Liberal Democrats	Thom Holmes	73	3.0	▼1.5
Majority		628	25.5	N/A
Turnout		2463		
Registered electors				
Reform gain from Conservative		Swing	▲43.9	

Hartshill & Mancetter
Party	Candidate	Votes	%	±%
Reform	Jennifer Warren	1,210	50.1	New
Labour	Katie Hobley	577	23.9	▼1.0
Conservative	Richard Baxter-Payne*	469	19.4	▼46.8
Liberal Democrats	Iain Duck	104	4.3	New
Heritage	Peter Downes	55	2.3	New
Majority		633	26.2	N/A
Turnout		2415		
Registered electors				
Reform gain from Conservative		Swing	▲48.5	

Kingsbury
Party	Candidate	Votes	%	±%
Reform	Stuart Green	1,174	47.9	New
Conservative	Andy Jenns*	917	37.4	▼43.2
Labour	Hayden Phillips	252	10.3	▼9.1
Liberal Democrats	Elizabeth Coles	108	4.4	New
Majority		257	10.5	N/A
Turnout		2451		
Registered electors				
Reform gain from Conservative		Swing	▲45.6	

Polesworth
Party	Candidate	Votes	%	±%
Reform	Stephen Shaw	1,151	47.2	New
Conservative	Marian Humphreys*	583	23.9	▼26.0
Labour	Neil Chapman	400	16.4	▼25.7
Independent	Michael Osborne	212	8.7	New
Liberal Democrats	Roger Harding	95	3.9	New
Majority		568	23.3	N/A
Turnout		2441		
Registered electors				
Reform gain from Conservative		Swing	▲36.6	

=== Nuneaton and Bedworth ===
Nuneaton & Bedworth district summary
Party	Seats	+/-	Votes	%	+/-
Reform UK	12	▲12	14,094	44.7	+44.5
Green	1	▲1	3,654	11.6	-1.6
Conservative	0	▼12	7,052	22.4	-34.6
Labour	0	▼1	4,881	15.5	-10.0
Liberal Democrats	0	Steady	1,180	3.7	+3.8
TUSC	0	Steady	540	1.7	+1.2
Workers Party	0	Steady	104	0.1	N/A
Total	13	Steady	31,505		

Division results

Arbury
Party	Candidate	Votes	%	±%
Reform	Wayne Briggs	1,118	52.7	New
Conservative	Michael Green	449	21.2	▼42.4
Labour	Eric Amaechi	378	17.8	▼9.2
Liberal Democrats	Victoria Alcock	121	5.7	▲4.2
TUSC	Eve Miller	54	2.5	New
Majority		669	31.6	N/A
Turnout		2120		
Registered electors				
Reform gain from Conservative		Swing	▲47.6	

Attleborough
Party	Candidate	Votes	%	±%
Reform	Rob Howard	1,014	47.9	▲46.0
Conservative	Graham Curtis	376	17.8	▼26.4
Labour Co-op	Steve Hey	367	17.3	▼2.8
Green	Spring Vernon	153	7.2	▲0.7
Workers Party	John Homer	104	4.9	New
Liberal Democrats	Peter Brown	102	4.8	New
Majority		638	30.2	N/A
Turnout		2116		
Registered electors				
Reform gain from Conservative		Swing	▲36.2	

Bedworth Central
Party	Candidate	Votes	%	±%
Reform	George Finch	1,563	62.1	New
Labour	Julie Jackson	421	16.7	▼17.1
Conservative	Martin Walsh	346	13.8	▼52.4
Liberal Democrats	Alan Beddow	126	5.0	New
TUSC	George Clark	60	2.4	New
Majority		1142		
Turnout		2516	45.4	N/A
Registered electors				
Reform gain from Conservative		Swing	▲57.3	

Bedworth East
Party	Candidate	Votes	%	±%
Reform	Stan Carvell	1,083	48.8	New
Labour Co-op	Rob Roze	472	21.3	▼9.2
Conservative	Brian Hammersley*	405	18.3	▼44.1
Green	Krissi Cope	169	7.6	▲0.4
Liberal Democrats	Ian Eccleston	68	3.1	New
TUSC	Steve Gee	21	0.9	New
Majority		611	27.5	N/A
Turnout		2218		
Registered electors				
Reform gain from Conservative		Swing	▲46.5	

Bedworth North
Party	Candidate	Votes	%	±%
Reform	Neil Garland	1,191	48.7	New
Conservative	Sue Markham*	743	30.4	▼32.7
Labour	Brandon Jiggins	372	15.2	▼13.7
Liberal Democrats	Lynn Bowring	98	4.0	New
TUSC	Mark Burdett	40	1.6	▼0.5
Majority		448	18.3	N/A
Turnout		2444		
Registered electors				
Reform gain from Conservative		Swing	▲40.7	

Bedworth West
Party	Candidate	Votes	%	±%
Reform	Chris Morris	1,097	49.5	New
Conservative	Pete Gilbert*	556	25.1	▼35.7
Labour	Sunday Ajayi	344	15.5	▼14.3
Green	Merle Gering	141	6.4	▲0.1
Liberal Democrats	Ederyn Williams	53	2.4	New
TUSC	Eileen Hunter	26	1.2	▼2.0
Majority		541	24.4	N/A
Turnout		2217		
Registered electors				
Reform gain from Conservative		Swing	▲42.6	

Bulkington & Whitestone
Party	Candidate	Votes	%	±%
Reform	John Waine	1,215	40.1	New
Conservative	Richard Smith	1,185	39.1	▼36.1
Labour	Verity Robinson	349	11.5	▼6.2
Green	Tess Brookes	164	5.4	▼1.7
Liberal Democrats	Chris Walsh	101	3.3	New
TUSC	Paul Reilly	18	0.6	New
Majority		30	1.0	N/A
Turnout		3032		
Registered electors				
Reform gain from Conservative		Swing	▲38.1	

Camp Hill
Party	Candidate	Votes	%	±%
Reform	Dale Bridgewater	947	48.9	New
Labour	Alex Ratcliffe	357	18.4	▼13.2
Conservative	Colin Cape	294	15.2	▼38.9
Green	Emma Shiers	246	12.7	▲1.7
Liberal Democrats	Gerry Jackson	75	3.9	New
TUSC	Christopher Gamble	16	0.8	▼2.5
Majority		590	30.5	N/A
Turnout		1935		
Registered electors				
Reform gain from Conservative		Swing	43.9	

Galley Common
Party	Candidate	Votes	%	±%
Reform	Luke Shingler	1,289	52.5	New
Conservative	Neal Pointon	449	18.3	▼41.2
Labour	Sutish Badhan	369	15.0	▼17.0
Green	David Fletcher	200	8.1	▼0.3
Liberal Democrats	Toby Lee	119	4.8	New
TUSC	Catherine Mosey	30	1.2	New
Majority		840	34.2	N/A
Turnout		2456		
Registered electors				
Reform gain from Conservative		Swing	▲46.9	

Nuneaton Abbey
Party	Candidate	Votes	%	±%
Reform	Mike Bannister	654	32.5	New
Labour	Caroline Phillips*	572	28.4	▼22.5
Conservative	Scott Harbison	254	12.6	▼21.6
Green	Mike Wright	240	11.9	▲2.6
TUSC	Keith Claridge	225	11.2	New
Liberal Democrats	Frederik Dahlmann	67	3.3	New
Majority		82	4.1	N/A
Turnout		2012		
Registered electors				
Reform gain from Labour		Swing	▲27.5	

Nuneaton East
Party	Candidate	Votes	%	±%
Reform	Darren Cheshire	1,269	40.7	New
Conservative	Jeff Clarke*	955	30.6	▼27.3
Green	Michele Kondakor	465	14.9	▼11.8
Labour	Christopher Holland	299	9.6	▼1.6
Liberal Democrats	Thomas Reidy	119	3.8	New
TUSC	Joshua Loveridge	13	0.4	New
Majority		314	10.1	New
Turnout		3120		
Registered electors				
Reform gain from Conservative		Swing	▲34.0	

Stockingford
Party	Candidate	Votes	%	±%
Reform	Nigel Golby	1,036	53.3	New
Labour	Nicky King	366	18.8	▼15.3
Conservative	Pauly Palamattom	308	15.9	▼37.9
Green	Alan Baxter	161	8.3	▼0.2
Liberal Democrats	Dani Hunter	50	2.6	New
TUSC	Daniel Webb	22	1.1	New
Majority		670	34.5	N/A
Turnout		1943		
Registered electors				
Reform gain from Conservative		Swing	▲45.6	

Weddington
Party	Candidate	Votes	%	±%
Green	Keith Kondakor	1,715	44.8	0.0
Reform	Kirk Holland	1,070	28.0	New
Conservative	Tom Byrne	732	19.1	▼26.0
Labour	Matthew Smith	215	5.6	▼4.5
Liberal Democrats	Joy Salaja	81	2.1	New
TUSC	Bernadette Quinn	15	0.4	New
Majority		645	16.8	N/A
Turnout		3828		
Registered electors				
Green gain from Conservative		Swing	▲13.0	

=== Rugby ===
Rugby district summary
Party	Seats	+/-	Votes	%	+/-
Conservative	4	▼3	8,708	30.1	-19.5
Reform UK	2	▲2	8,085	27.9	N/A
Labour	2	Steady	5,406	18.7	-7.4
Liberal Democrats	2	▲1	5,267	18.2	+2.5
Green	0	Steady	1,448	5.0	-3.4
National Housing Party	0	Steady	33	0.1	N/A
Total	10	Steady	28,947		

Division results

Admirals & Cawston
Party	Candidate	Votes	%	±%
Conservative	Dean Richards	1,113	35.7	▼15.3
Reform	John Birch	828	26.6	New
Labour	Alan Pavis	727	23.3	▼7.9
Liberal Democrats	Lee Chase	242	7.8	▼3.3
Green	Frank Green	207	6.6	▼0.2
Majority		285	9.1	▼10.7
Turnout		3,117	33.3	
Registered electors				
Conservative hold		Swing	▼21.0	

Benn
Party	Candidate	Votes	%	±%
Labour	Sarah Feeney*	842	42.5	▼5.9
Reform	Shane Benton	471	23.8	New
Conservative	Christopher Johnson	272	13.7	▼16.0
Green	Becca Stevenson	259	13.1	▼1.0
Liberal Democrats	James Moran	136	6.9	▼0.9
Majority		371	18.7	0.0
Turnout		1,980	23.4	
Registered electors				
Labour hold		Swing	▼14.9	

Bilton & Hillside
Party	Candidate	Votes	%	±%
Liberal Democrats	Stephen Pimm	1,183	37.2	▲4.0
Conservative	Michael Howling	905	28.5	▼17.4
Reform	Gareth Burgess	764	24.0	New
Labour	David Buckingham	327	10.3	▼4.9
Majority		278	8.7	N/A
Turnout		3,179	42.4	
Registered electors				
Liberal Democrats gain from Conservative		Swing	▲10.7	

Brownsover & Coton Park
Party	Candidate	Votes	%	±%
Labour	Senthil Karadiar	816	32.4	▼5.1
Reform	Jamie Pullin	724	28.7	New
Conservative	Wayne Rabin	715	28.4	▼20.7
Liberal Democrats	Edward Blackburn	265	10.5	▲5.2
Majority		92	3.7	N/A
Turnout		2,520	31.4	
Registered electors				
Labour gain from Conservative		Swing	▲7.8	

Dunsmore & Leam Valley
Party	Candidate	Votes	%	±%
Conservative	Dale Keeling	1,177	32.1	▼33.7
Reform	Ian Jones	1,034	28.2	New
Liberal Democrats	Isabelle McKenzie	997	27.2	▲20.3
Labour	Nicola Jones	246	6.7	▼12.2
Green	Helen Ford	213	5.8	▼2.6
Majority		143	3.9	▼43.0
Turnout		3,667	38.8	
Registered electors				
Conservative hold		Swing	▼31.0	

Earl Craven
Party	Candidate	Votes	%	±%
Reform	Anne-Marie Sonko	960	33.7	New
Conservative	Devenne Kedward	915	32.1	▼32.1
Labour	Rishi Caleyachetty	563	19.8	▼1.2
Green	Pete Nash	225	7.9	▼6.9
Liberal Democrats	Nicky Bainbridge	185	6.5	New
Majority		45	1.6	N/A
Turnout		2,848	34.6	
Registered electors				
Reform gain from Conservative		Swing	▲32.9	

Eastlands
Party	Candidate	Votes	%	±%
Liberal Democrats	Jerry Roodhouse*	1,293	48.0	▼2.4
Reform	Francis Holden	697	25.9	New
Labour	Philip Burns	281	10.4	▼6.5
Conservative	Sarah Downes	274	10.2	▼16.6
Green	Bob Beggs	148	5.5	▼0.3
Majority		596	22.1	▼1.5
Turnout		2,693	34.8	
Registered electors				
Liberal Democrats hold		Swing	▼14.2	

Fosse
Party	Candidate	Votes	%	±%
Conservative	Adrian Warwick*	1,794	47.0	▼16.5
Reform	Paignton Morris	1,132	29.7	New
Labour	Tony Freeman	451	11.8	▼10.6
Green	Maralyn Pickup	224	5.9	▼2.2
Liberal Democrats	Victoria Edwards	215	5.6	▼0.3
Majority		662	17.3	▼23.8
Turnout		3,816	29.8	
Registered electors				
Conservative hold		Swing	▼23.1	

Hillmorton
Party	Candidate	Votes	%	±%
Conservative	Yousef Dahmash*	1,257	40.2	▼14.9
Reform	Gareth Keeley	834	26.7	New
Labour	Alison Livesey	580	18.5	▼4.6
Liberal Democrats	Mark Thomas	424	13.6	▼1.9
National Housing Party	Lloyd Morgan	33	1.0	New
Majority		423	13.5	▼18.5
Turnout		3,128	32.7	
Registered electors				
Conservative hold		Swing	▼20.8	

New Bilton & Overslade
Party	Candidate	Votes	%	±%
Reform	Dan Glover	641	32.1	New
Labour	Barbara Brown*	573	28.7	▼11.3
Liberal Democrats	Samuel Edwards	327	16.4	▲0.3
Conservative	JP Downes	286	14.3	▼19.2
Green	Christopher Mawby	172	8.6	▼1.7
Majority		68	3.4	N/A
Turnout		1,999	27.8	
Registered electors				
Reform gain from Labour		Swing	▲21.7	

=== Stratford-on-Avon ===
Stratford-on-Avon district summary
Party	Seats	+/-	Votes	%	+/-
Liberal Democrats	7	▲5	13,493	32.1	
Conservative	4	▼7	13,063	31.1	
Reform UK	2	▲2	10,876	25.9	
Green	0	Steady	2,844	6.8	
Labour	0	Steady	1,789	4.3	
Total	13	Steady	42,065		

Division results

Alcester
Party	Candidate	Votes	%	±%
Liberal Democrats	James Norris	1,196	35.0	▼3.3
Reform	Ashley Jones	898	26.3	New
Conservative	Sarah Hession	820	24.0	▼22.4
Labour	Andrew Foster	381	11.2	▲0.8
Green	Tom Genders	119	3.5	▼1.4
Majority		298	8.7	N/A
Turnout		3414	41.2	
Registered electors				
Liberal Democrats gain from Conservative		Swing	▲9.6	

Arden
Party	Candidate	Votes	%	±%
Reform	James Crocker	1,273	37.3	New
Conservative	India Tibbs	988	28.9	▼45.1
Liberal Democrats	Stuart Keighley	917	26.9	▲19.8
Green	Helen Mitchell	147	4.3	▼4.6
Labour	Jude Doherty	90	2.6	▼7.4
Majority		285	8.3	N/A
Turnout		3415	40.5	
Registered electors				
Reform gain from Conservative		Swing	▲41.2	

Bidford & Welford
Party	Candidate	Votes	%	±%
Liberal Democrats	Cliff Brown	1,356	35.0	▲1.6
Reform	Neil Lawrence	1,340	34.6	New
Conservative	Bill Fleming	873	22.5	▼27.9
Green	Sarah Cohen	177	4.6	▼1.2
Labour	John Hartigan	127	3.3	▼7.0
Majority		16	0.4	N/A
Turnout		3873	34.9	
Registered electors				
Liberal Democrats gain from Conservative		Swing	▲14.8	

Feldon
Party	Candidate	Votes	%	±%
Conservative	Christopher Kettle*	1,133	33.4	▼22.4
Liberal Democrats	Louis Adam	1,126	33.2	▲11.8
Reform	Joshua Hearne-Wilkins	783	23.1	New
Labour	Rachel Frenguelli	192	5.7	▼4.7
Green	Michael Mordue	159	4.7	▼7.5
Majority		7	0.2	▼34.2
Turnout		3393	37.3	
Registered electors				
Conservative hold		Swing	▼17.1	

Kineton & Red Horse
Party	Candidate	Votes	%	±%
Conservative	Christopher Mills*	1,404	45.3	▼21.3
Reform	John Leary	799	25.8	New
Liberal Democrats	Nick Solmoan	359	11.6	▲0.6
Green	Rob Ballantyne	351	11.3	▲0.1
Labour	Bruno Frenguelli	183	5.9	▼5.2
Majority		605	19.5	▼35.9
Turnout		3096	38.4	
Registered electors				
Conservative hold		Swing	▼23.6	

Shipston
Party	Candidate	Votes	%	±%
Conservative	Jo Barker*	1,325	37.4	▼11.8
Green	Julie Hudson	899	25.4	▼5.4
Reform	Robert Palmer	823	23.3	New
Liberal Democrats	Andy Fincham	384	10.9	▼4.1
Labour	Mary Fraser	108	3.1	▼1.7
Majority		426	12.0	▼6.4
Turnout		3539	42.4	
Registered electors				
Conservative hold		Swing	▼3.2	

Southam, Stockton & Napton
Party	Candidate	Votes	%	±%
Conservative	Andy Crump*	1,780	60.1	▼14.8
Reform	James Mosscrop	569	19.2	New
Green	Zoe James	261	8.8	▲3.1
Liberal Democrats	Chris Lambert	201	6.8	▼0.1
Labour	Trevor Dutton	151	5.1	▼7.2
Majority		1211	40.9	▼21.7
Turnout		2962	33.5	
Registered electors				
Conservative hold		Swing	▼17.0	

Stour and the Vale
Party	Candidate	Votes	%	±%
Liberal Democrats	David Curtis	1,129	37.1	▲0.3
Conservative	Izzi Seccombe*	961	31.6	▼20.9
Reform	Sean Edmunds	760	25.0	New
Green	Allison Aves	127	4.2	▼1.7
Labour	Sally Bigwood	67	2.2	▼2.5
Majority		168	5.5	N/A
Turnout		3044	43.1	
Registered electors				
Liberal Democrats gain from Conservative		Swing	▲10.6	

Stratford North
Party	Candidate	Votes	%	±%
Liberal Democrats	Lorraine Grocott	1,118	38.0	0.0
Conservative	Tim Sinclair*	1,027	34.9	▼6.8
Reform	Julie Allison	532	18.0	New
Labour Co-op	Jacob Hill	148	5.0	▼6.2
Green	Niki Carpenter	117	4.0	▼4.9
Majority		91	3.1	N/A
Turnout		2942	36.4	
Registered electors				
Liberal Democrats gain from Conservative		Swing	▲3.4	

Stratford South
Party	Candidate	Votes	%	±%
Liberal Democrats	Kate Rolfe*	2,181	60.3	▲2.6
Reform	Helen Cooper	786	21.7	▲18.8
Conservative	Krish Bengarajli	443	12.3	▼16.5
Labour	Matthew Peacock	111	3.1	▼2.3
Green	Peter Pettifor	95	2.6	▼2.4
Majority		1395	38.6	▲9.7
Turnout		3616	41.6	
Registered electors				
Liberal Democrats hold		Swing	▼8.1	

Stratford West
Party	Candidate	Votes	%	±%
Liberal Democrats	Steve Albon	1,259	46.1	▼10.4
Reform	Tina Brough	678	24.8	New
Conservative	Jane Meehan	519	19.0	▼10.5
Labour	Jason Fojtik	140	5.1	▼2.1
Green	Vince Herbert	135	4.9	▼1.7
Majority		581	21.3	▼5.7
Turnout		2731	36.9	
Registered electors				
Liberal Democrats hold		Swing	▼17.6	

Studley
Party	Candidate	Votes	%	±%
Reform	Luke Cooper	871	32.8	New
Conservative	Justin Kerridge*	828	31.2	▼16.9
Liberal Democrats	Peter Hencher-Serafin	768	28.9	▼11.4
Green	Sherron Guise	99	3.7	▼0.9
Labour	Alastair Nealon	91	3.4	▼3.3
Majority		43	1.6	N/A
Turnout		2657	35.8	
Registered electors				
Reform gain from Conservative		Swing	▲24.9	

Wellesbourne
Party	Candidate	Votes	%	±%
Liberal Democrats	George Cowcher	1,499	43.0	▲16.2
Conservative	Penny-Anne O'Donnell*	962	27.6	▼27.8
Reform	James Pink	764	21.9	New
Green	Tess Venus	158	4.5	▼3.2
Labour	David Spillane	105	3.0	▼5.8
Majority		537	15.4	N/A
Turnout		3488	40.0	
Registered electors				
Liberal Democrats gain from Conservative		Swing	▲22.0	

=== Warwick ===
Warwick district summary
Party	Seats	+/-	Votes	%	+/-
Green	6	▲3	10,764	26.5	+6.1
Liberal Democrats	5	▲3	7,515	18.5	+1.5
Conservative	1	▼4	7,198	17.7	-14.8
Labour	1	▼2	6,026	14.8	-10.7
Whitnash Residents	1	Steady	939	2.3	-0.3
Reform UK	0	Steady	7,944	19.5	N/A
Independent	0	Steady	206	0.5	-0.6
Freedom Alliance	0	Steady	40	0.1	N/A
UKIP	0	Steady	32	0.1	-0.1
Total	14	Steady	40,664		

Division results

Budbrooke & Bishop's Tachbrook
Party	Candidate	Votes	%	±%
Conservative	Jan Matecki*	1,386	33.5	▼21.5
Labour	Jenny Bevan	1,060	25.6	▲1.3
Reform	Colin Oliver	1,010	24.4	N/A
Green	Marcia Watson	343	8.3	▼4.5
Liberal Democrats	Paul McCloskey	341	8.2	▲0.4
Majority		326	7.9	▼22.8
Turnout				
Registered electors				
Conservative hold		Swing	▼11.4	

Cubbington & Leek Wootton
Party	Candidate	Votes	%	±%
Liberal Democrats	Ben Edwards	805	28.1	▲19.3
Reform	Stephen Esslemont	629	22.0	N/A
Conservative	Isabella Moore	624	21.8	▼34.5
Green	Becky Davidson	463	16.2	▲3.7
Labour	Linda Hugl	198	6.9	▼13.5
Independent	Wallace Redford*	146	5.1	N/A
Majority		176	6.1	N/A
Turnout				
Registered electors				
Liberal Democrats gain from Conservative		Swing	▲26.9	

Kenilworth Park Hill
Party	Candidate	Votes	%	±%
Green	Tracey Drew*	1,365	46.0	▼7.3
Conservative	Malcolm Graham	794	26.7	▼5.5
Reform	Andrew Harwood	485	16.3	N/A
Liberal Democrats	Adrian Marsh	268	9.0	▲2.7
Labour	Sarah Purdy	141	4.7	▼1.5
Independent	Trevor Wright	47	1.4	N/A
Majority		571	19.3	▼3.8
Turnout				
Registered electors				
Green hold		Swing	▼0.9	

Kenilworth St John's
Party	Candidate	Votes	%	±%
Liberal Democrats	Richard Dickson	1,352	38.7	▲8.8
Conservative	Rik Spencer*	730	20.9	▼19.5
Green	Joe Rukin	638	18.3	▲4.8
Reform	Tim Wade	513	14.7	N/A
Labour	Jeremy Eastaugh	260	7.4	▼5.3
Majority		622	17.8	
Turnout				
Registered electors				
Liberal Democrats gain from Conservative		Swing	▲13.7	

Lapworth & West Kenilworth
Party	Candidate	Votes	%	±%
Green	Mark Stevens	1,032	34.9	▲15.1
Conservative	Richard Hales	907	30.7	▼16.7
Reform	Stillyan Petrov	594	20.1	N/A
Liberal Democrats	John Dubber	340	11.5	▲1.4
Labour	Kevin Purdy	86	2.9	▼6.4
Majority		125	4.2	
Turnout		2959		
Registered electors				
Green gain from Conservative		Swing	▲15.9	

Leamington Brunswick
Party	Candidate	Votes	%	±%
Green	Jonathan Chilvers*	1,273	61.1	▲2.6
Reform	Ethan Liddell	370	17.8	New
Labour Co-op	Chris Knight	287	13.8	▼13.4
Conservative	Jack Alexander	101	4.8	▼5.0
Liberal Democrats	Perjit Aujla	53	2.5	▼0.4
Majority		903	43.3	▲12.0
Turnout		2,084		
Registered electors				
Green hold		Swing	▼7.6	

Leamington Clarendon
Party	Candidate	Votes	%	±%
Liberal Democrats	Max Langer	777	31.3	▲6.7
Labour	Sarah Millar*	749	30.2	▼11.8
Reform	Geoff Diamond	352	14.2	New
Green	Eloise Chilvers	301	12.1	▲3.6
Conservative	William de Save	252	10.1	▼12.2
Freedom Alliance	Alex Mackay	40	1.6	New
Independent	Eyal Zimran	13	0.5	New
Majority		28	1.1	N/A
Turnout		2,484		
Registered electors				
Liberal Democrats gain from Labour		Swing	▲9.3	

Leamington Milverton
Party	Candidate	Votes	%	±%
Liberal Democrats	Jennifer McAllister	1,461	53.5	▼4.5
Reform	Ross Garner	379	13.9	New
Labour	Ruby Turok-Squire	324	11.9	▼5.4
Conservative	Hayley Key	287	10.5	▼7.5
Green	Christopher Tagg	279	10.2	▲3.5
Majority		1082	39.6	▼0.4
Turnout		2,730		
Registered electors				
Liberal Democrats hold		Swing	▼9.2	

Leamington North
Party	Candidate	Votes	%	±%
Liberal Democrats	Sarah Boad*	1,579	50.4	0.0
Reform	Adam Allen	694	22.1	New
Green	Angela Smith	346	11.0	▲3.3
Labour	Jane Knight	276	8.8	▼13.1
Conservative	Lucy Marshall	241	7.7	▼11.0
Majority		885	28.2	▼0.3
Turnout		3,136		
Registered electors				
Liberal Democrats hold		Swing	▼11.1	

Leamington Willes
Party	Candidate	Votes	%	±%
Green	Will Roberts*	1,506	62.3	▲7.6
Labour	Krish Bhardwaj	384	15.9	▼18.7
Reform	Siobhan Gibbs	352	14.6	New
Conservative	Jack McCann	116	4.8	▼4.4
Liberal Democrats	Paulo Viana	58	2.4	▲0.9
Majority		1,122	46.4	▲26.3
Turnout		2,416		
Registered electors				
Green hold		Swing	▲13.2	

Warwick North
Party	Candidate	Votes	%	±%
Green	Sam Jones	1,254	46.4	New
Reform	David Norris	615	22.8	New
Conservative	Oliver Jacques	381	14.1	▼29.5
Labour	Simon Pargeter	378	14.0	▼33.1
Liberal Democrats	Laurence Byrne	75	2.8	▼2.7
Majority		639	23.6	New
Turnout		2,703		
Registered electors				
Green gain from Labour		Swing	▲39.8	

Warwick South
Party	Candidate	Votes	%	±%
Green	Nicki Scott	1,627	45.9	▲19.9
Conservative	Phillip Rothwell	664	18.7	▼18.9
Reform	Mike Dudley	653	18.4	New
Labour Co-op	Julie Stevens	459	12.9	▼8.0
Liberal Democrats	Kelvin Lambert	143	4.0	▼10.4
Majority		963	27.2	N/A
Turnout		3,546		
Registered electors				
Green gain from Conservative		Swing	▲19.4	

Warwick West
Party	Candidate	Votes	%	±%
Labour	John Holland*	1,161	37.7	▼13.9
Reform	Nigel Clarke	859	27.9	New
Conservative	Moira-Ann Grainger	523	17.0	▼18.3
Green	Supreet Tangri	337	10.9	▲2.2
Liberal Democrats	Mubarik Chowdry	200	6.5	▲2.1
Majority		302	9.8	▼6.5
Turnout		3,080		
Registered electors				
Labour hold		Swing	▼10.5	

Whitnash
Party	Candidate	Votes	%	±%
Whitnash Residents	Judy Falp*	939	42.5	▼3.5
Reform	Aidan Flaherty	439	19.9	New
Green	Sarah Richards	279	12.6	▲5.5
Labour Co-op	Daniel Wilkinson	263	11.9	▼14.5
Conservative	Ben Jackson	192	8.7	▼7.5
Liberal Democrats	Justine Ragany	63	2.9	▲1.4
UKIP	Laurie Steele	32	1.4	▼1.3
Majority		500	22.7	▲3.1
Turnout		2,207		
Registered electors				
Whitnash Residents hold		Swing	▼11.7	

== See also ==
- Warwickshire County Council elections
