= 2019 Warwick District Council election =

2019 UK local government election

- 2 May 2019

All 44 seats to Warwick District Council 23 seats needed for a majority

	First party	Second party	Third party
Party	Conservative	Liberal Democrats	Green
Last election	31 seats, 43.3%	2 seats, 13.1%	1 seat, 13.4%
Seats won	19	9	8
Seat change	▼12	▲7	▲7
Popular vote	30,953	24,720	23,722
Percentage	29.4%	23.5%	22.5%
Swing	▼13.9%	▲10.4%	▲9.1%
	Fourth party	Fifth party
Party	Labour	Whitnash Residents
Last election	9 seats, 22.7%	3 seats, 3.7%
Seats won	5	3
Seat change	▼4	Steady
Popular vote	20,552	4,123
Percentage	19.5%	3.9%
Swing	▼3.2%	▲0.2%
- Winner of each seat at the 2019 Warwick District Council election

- Composition of the council after the election
Council control before election
Conservative
Council control after election
No overall control

The 2019 Warwick District Council election took place on 2 May 2019 to elect members of Warwick District Council in England. This was on the same day as other local elections. The whole council was up for election on new boundaries. The Conservative Party lost control of the council.

== Summary ==
=== Election result ===
2019 Warwick District Council election
Party	Candidates	Seats	Gains	Losses	Net gain/loss	Seats %	Votes %	Votes	+/−
Conservative	44	19	0	0	▼12	43.2	29.4	30,953	–13.9
Liberal Democrats	29	9	0	0	▲7	20.5	23.5	24,720	+10.4
Green	41	8	0	0	▲7	18.2	22.5	23,722	+9.1
Labour	32	5	0	0	▼4	11.4	19.5	20,552	–3.2
Whitnash Residents	3	3	0	0	Steady	6.8	3.9	4,123	+0.2
UKIP Make Brexit Happen	6	0	0	0	Steady	0.0	1.2	1,285	–1.1

== Ward results ==
=== Bishop's Tachbrook ===
Bishop's Tachbrook (2 seats)
Party	Candidate	Votes	%	±%
Conservative	Andrew Day*	518	49.4	
Conservative	David Norris	430	41.0	
Labour	Martin Drew	422	40.2	
Green	Pippa Austin	165	15.7	
Liberal Democrats	Deborah Pittarello	140	13.3	
Green	Alison Firth	130	12.4	
Majority		8	0.8	
Registered electors		3,125		
Rejected ballots		10	0.9	
Turnout		1,059	33.9	
Conservative hold				
Conservative win (new seat)				

=== Budbrooke ===
Budbrooke (2 seats)
Party	Candidate	Votes	%	±%
Conservative	Alan Rhead*	1,129	55.6	
Conservative	Jan Matecki	991	48.8	
Green	Pam Lunn	538	26.5	
Green	David Armstrong	471	23.2	
Labour	Felix Ling	326	16.0	
UKIP Make Brexit Happen	Terry Court	257	12.6	
Majority		453	22.3	
Registered electors		4,911		
Rejected ballots		19	0.9	
Turnout		2,051	41.8	
Conservative hold				
Conservative hold				

=== Cubbington and Leek Wootton ===
Cubbington & Leek Wootton (2 seats)
Party	Candidate	Votes	%	±%
Conservative	Pamela Redford*	856	51.8	
Conservative	Trevor Wright*	848	51.4	
Labour	Josh Payne	408	24.7	
Labour	Nicholas Hoten	404	24.5	
Green	Chris Philpott	357	21.6	
Green	Anthony O'Brien	308	18.7	
Majority		440	26.7	
Registered electors		4,539		
Rejected ballots		25	1.5	
Turnout		1,676	36.9	
Conservative win (new seat)				
Conservative win (new seat)				

=== Kenilworth Abbey and Arden ===
Kenilworth Abbey & Arden (3 seats)
Party	Candidate	Votes	%	±%
Conservative	John Cooke*	1,357	48.4	
Conservative	Richard Hales	1,346	48.0	
Conservative	George Illingworth*	1,334	47.5	
Liberal Democrats	Pat Ryan	655	23.3	
Green	James Harrison	628	22.4	
Liberal Democrats	Alan Chalmers	610	21.7	
Liberal Democrats	Andy Tulloch	562	20.0	
Green	George Martin	544	19.4	
Green	Peter Jones	481	17.1	
Labour	Peter Shiels	302	10.8	
Majority		679	24.2	
Registered electors		7,515		
Rejected ballots		50	1.8	
Turnout		2,856	38.0	
Conservative win (new seat)				
Conservative win (new seat)				
Conservative win (new seat)				

=== Kenilworth Park Hill ===
Kenilworth Park Hill (3 seats)
Party	Candidate	Votes	%	±%
Green	Alix Dearing	1,629	50.2	
Green	Alistair Kennedy	1,483	45.7	
Green	John Dearing	1,477	45.6	
Conservative	Dave Shilton*	1,177	36.3	
Conservative	Felicity Bunker*	1,097	33.8	
Conservative	Andrew Mobbs*	1,041	32.1	
Liberal Democrats	Jack Worrall	345	10.6	
Liberal Democrats	Samantha Cooke	338	10.4	
Labour	Audrey Mullender	286	8.8	
Labour	Andrew Roadnight	268	8.3	
Labour	Stephen Snart	220	6.8	
Majority		300	9.3	
Registered electors		7,864		
Rejected ballots		51	1.5	
Turnout		3,293	41.9	
Green win (new seat)				
Green win (new seat)				
Green win (new seat)				

=== Kenilworth St John's ===
Kenilworth St John's (3 seats)
Party	Candidate	Votes	%	±%
Liberal Democrats	Richard Dickson	2,299	66.8	
Liberal Democrats	Kate Dickson	2,292	66.6	
Liberal Democrats	Andrew Milton	2,061	59.9	
Conservative	Richard Davies*	1,125	32.7	
Conservative	Marilyn Bates	1,100	32.0	
Conservative	Pat Cain*	1,078	31.3	
Majority		936	27.2	
Registered electors		7,748		
Rejected ballots		70	2.0	
Turnout		3,512	45.3	
Liberal Democrats win (new seat)				
Liberal Democrats win (new seat)				
Liberal Democrats win (new seat)				

=== Leamington Brunswick ===
Leamington Brunswick (3 seats)
Party	Candidate	Votes	%	±%
Green	Amy Evans	1,241	56.3	
Green	Ian Davison*	1,223	55.5	
Green	Naveen Tangri	1,111	50.4	
Labour	Kristie Naimo*	846	38.4	
Labour	Jojo Norris	774	35.1	
Labour	Alec Roberts	625	28.4	
Conservative	James Butler	192	8.7	
Conservative	Tom Peake	142	6.4	
Conservative	David Stevens	127	5.8	
Liberal Democrats	George Begg	101	4.6	
Majority		265	12.0	
Registered electors		7,398		
Rejected ballots		18	0.8	
Turnout		2,222	30.0	
Green win (new seat)				
Green win (new seat)				
Green win (new seat)				

=== Leamington Clarendon ===
Leamington Clarendon (3 seats)
Party	Candidate	Votes	%	±%
Labour	Geraldine Cullinan	1,021	36.6	
Labour	Jonathan Nicholls	977	35.0	
Labour	Jerry Weber	896	32.1	
Liberal Democrats	Perjit Aujla	873	31.3	
Liberal Democrats	John Kelly	817	29.3	
Liberal Democrats	Charles Turner	784	28.1	
Conservative	Daniel Simpson	520	18.6	
Conservative	Thomas Thorp	520	18.6	
Conservative	John Tweedy	504	18.1	
Green	Tony Ross	360	12.9	
Green	Niqui Townsend	357	12.8	
Green	Bernie McCullagh	332	11.9	
UKIP Make Brexit Happen	James Chalmers	188	6.7	
Majority		23	0.8	
Registered electors		7,788		
Rejected ballots		9	0.3	
Turnout		2,798	35.9	
Labour win (new seat)				
Labour win (new seat)				
Labour win (new seat)				

=== Leamington Lillington ===
Leamington Lillington (3 seats)
Party	Candidate	Votes	%	±%
Liberal Democrats	Alan Boad*	1,698	49.7	
Liberal Democrats	Heather Calver	1,505	44.1	
Liberal Democrats	Phil Kohler	1,464	42.9	
Labour	Stef Parkins*	773	22.6	
Labour	Pip Burley	760	22.3	
Labour	Paul Gillett	700	20.5	
Conservative	Jacqueline David	606	17.8	
Conservative	Gordon Cain*	532	15.6	
Conservative	Bryan Poole	485	14.2	
Green	James Barrett	448	13.1	
Green	Marcia Watson	408	12.0	
Green	Angela Smith	362	10.6	
Majority		691	20.2	
Registered electors		9,053		
Rejected ballots		0	0.0	
Turnout		3,414	37.7	
Liberal Democrats win (new seat)				
Liberal Democrats win (new seat)				
Liberal Democrats win (new seat)				

=== Leamington Milverton ===
Leamington Milverton (3 seats)
Party	Candidate	Votes	%	±%
Liberal Democrats	Bill Gifford*	2,131	62.8	
Liberal Democrats	Carolyn Gifford	1,718	50.7	
Liberal Democrats	Sidney Syson	1,583	46.7	
Conservative	Hayley Grainger*	852	25.1	
Conservative	Robert Old	727	21.4	
Conservative	Jake Sargent	628	18.5	
Labour	Susan Rasmussen	609	18.0	
Green	Alison Chakir	500	14.7	
Green	Charles Atkin	468	13.8	
Green	Andrew Stevenson	349	10.3	
Majority		731	21.6	
Registered electors		7,498		
Rejected ballots		24	0.7	
Turnout		3,415	45.5	
Liberal Democrats win (new seat)				
Liberal Democrats win (new seat)				
Liberal Democrats win (new seat)				

=== Leamington Willes ===
Leamington Willes (3 seats)
Party	Candidate	Votes	%	±%
Green	Martin Luckhurst	1,517	53.2	
Green	Will Roberts	1,184	41.5	
Labour	Mini Mangat	1,118	39.2	
Green	Peggy Wiseman	1,108	38.9	
Labour	John Barrott*	1,083	38.0	
Labour	Colin Quinney*	1,049	36.8	
Conservative	Stacey Calder	260	9.1	
Conservative	Luke Shortland	212	7.4	
Conservative	Joe Quick	206	7.2	
Liberal Democrats	David Alexander	205	7.2	
UKIP Make Brexit Happen	Gerry Smith	126	4.4	
Majority		10	0.4	
Registered electors		7,853		
Rejected ballots		16	0.6	
Turnout		2,867	36.5	
Green win (new seat)				
Green win (new seat)				
Labour win (new seat)				

=== Radford Semele ===
Radford Semele
Party	Candidate	Votes	%	±%
Conservative	Valerie Leigh-Hunt	504	48.5	
Liberal Democrats	Helen James	213	20.5	
Green	Tracey Drew	175	16.8	
Labour	Martin McMahon	147	14.1	
Majority		291	28.0	
Registered electors		2,616		
Rejected ballots		16	1.5	
Turnout		1,055	40.3	
Conservative win (new seat)				

=== Warwick All Saints and Woodloes ===
Warwick All Saints & Woodloes (3 seats)
Party	Candidate	Votes	%	±%
Conservative	Moira-Ann Grainger*	1,050	38.9	
Conservative	Jody Tracey	1,049	38.9	
Conservative	Oliver Jacques	919	34.1	
Labour	Jackie D'Arcy*	892	33.1	
Labour	Curtis Oliver-Smith	800	29.7	
Labour	John Sullivan	768	28.5	
Green	Simon Barrow	462	17.1	
Green	Julia Hart	434	16.1	
Liberal Democrats	John Cooper	343	12.7	
Green	Samuel Porter	333	12.3	
UKIP Make Brexit Happen	Martin Mackenzie	325	12.0	
Majority		27	1.0	
Registered electors		7,398		
Rejected ballots		43	1.6	
Turnout		2,741	37.1	
Conservative win (new seat)				
Conservative win (new seat)				
Conservative win (new seat)				

=== Warwick Aylesford ===
Warwick Aylesford (2 seats)
Party	Candidate	Votes	%	±%
Conservative	Liam Bartlett	668	39.9	
Conservative	Martyn Ashford*	661	39.5	
Labour	Daniel Browne	515	30.8	
Labour	Belinda Pyke	514	30.7	
Green	Juliet Nickels	263	15.7	
Liberal Democrats	Timothy Davis	256	15.3	
Green	James Alty	234	14.0	
Liberal Democrats	David Fisher	160	9.6	
Majority		146	8.7	
Registered electors		5,121		
Rejected ballots		32	1.9	
Turnout		1,705	33.3	
Conservative win (new seat)				
Conservative win (new seat)				

=== Warwick Myton and Heathcote ===
Warwick Myton & Heathcote (3 seats)
Party	Candidate	Votes	%	±%
Conservative	Mary Noone	808	41.4	
Conservative	Neale Murphy*	807	41.4	
Conservative	Sukhi Sanghera	756	38.8	
Labour	Viv Kaliczak	549	28.2	
Liberal Democrats	Kelvin Lambert	489	25.1	
Green	Jonathan Hofstetter	457	23.4	
Liberal Democrats	Nicholas Pittarello	456	23.4	
Green	Andrew Barker	454	23.3	
Green	Thomas Hudson	442	22.7	
Majority		207	10.6	
Registered electors		5,758		
Rejected ballots		39	2.0	
Turnout		1,989	34.5	
Conservative win (new seat)				
Conservative win (new seat)				
Conservative win (new seat)				

=== Warwick Saltisford ===
Warwick Saltisford (2 seats)
Party	Candidate	Votes	%	±%
Conservative	Terry Morris*	692	34.1	
Labour	Dave Skinner	679	33.5	
Labour	Nic Ruch	624	30.8	
Conservative	Llywelyn Colnet	602	29.7	
Green	David Cumner	318	15.7	
Liberal Democrats	Antony Butcher	261	12.9	
Green	Matt Swift	252	12.4	
Liberal Democrats	Alan Beddow	211	10.4	
UKIP Make Brexit Happen	Jennifer Instone	195	9.6	
Majority		55	2.7	
Registered electors		5,616		
Rejected ballots		15	0.7	
Turnout		2,044	36.4	
Conservative win (new seat)				
Labour win (new seat)				

=== Whitnash ===
Whitnash (3 seats)
Party	Candidate	Votes	%	±%
Whitnash Residents	Judy Falp*	1,487	60.7	
Whitnash Residents	Tony Heath*	1,376	56.2	
Whitnash Residents	Robert Margrave*	1,260	51.4	
Labour	William Clemmey	661	27.0	
Labour	Liam Jackson	536	21.9	
Green	Eloise Chilvers	317	12.9	
Green	Bob Edge	202	8.2	
Green	Bronwen Reid	200	8.2	
Conservative	Christine Cross	198	8.1	
UKIP Make Brexit Happen	Laurie Steele	194	7.9	
Conservative	Sarah Sabin	157	6.4	
Liberal Democrats	Ajay Pandey	150	6.1	
Conservative	Thomas Raynor	142	5.8	
Majority		599	24.4	
Registered electors		7,578		
Rejected ballots		11	0.4	
Turnout		2,461	32.5	
Whitnash Residents hold				
Whitnash Residents hold				
Whitnash Residents hold				

== Changes 2019–2023 ==
- In September 2019, Liberal Democrat councillor Heather Calver resigned from the Leamington Lillington ward for personal reasons.
- On 15 March 2021, Labour councillor Jerry Weber resigned from the Leamington Clarendon ward.
- On 23 September 2021, Whitnash Residents Association councillor Tony Heath died.
- On 15 March 2022, Labour councillor Jonathan Nicholls died following a car accident.
- In May 2022, Conservative councillors Terry Morris and Jacqui Grey resigned the Conservative whip and sat as independents.
- On 1 December 2022, Conservative councillor David Norris became an independent councillor.

=== By-elections ===
==== Leamington Lillington ====
Leamington Lillington by-election, 29 October 2019
Party	Candidate	Votes	%	±%
Liberal Democrats	Daniel Russell	1,296	55.3	+7.1
Conservative	Hayley Key	664	28.3	+11.1
Labour	Luc Lowndes	384	16.4	–5.5
Majority		632	27.0	
Rejected ballots		11	0.5	
Turnout		2,358	26.3	
Registered electors		8,971		
Liberal Democrats hold		Swing	▼2.0	

The by-election followed the resignation of Liberal Democrat councillor Heather Calver for personal reasons.

==== Warwick Myton & Heathcote ====
Warwick Myton & Heathcote by-election, 12 December 2019
Party	Candidate	Votes	%	±%
Conservative	Jacqui Grey	1,710	39.3	+4.2
Labour	Curtis Oliver-Smith	1,079	24.8	+1.0
Green	Paul Atkins	812	18.7	–1.1
Liberal Democrats	Hugh Foden	644	14.8	–6.4
Independent	Bob Dhillon	103	2.4	N/A
Majority		631	14.5	
Rejected ballots		23	0.5	
Turnout		4,371	74.9	
Registered electors		5,839		
Conservative hold		Swing	▲1.6	

The by-election followed the disqualification of Conservative councillor Sukhi Sanghera after he accepted a Bankruptcy Restrictions Undertaking.

==== Leamington Clarendon (May 2021) ====
Leamington Clarendon by-election, 6 May 2021
Party	Candidate	Votes	%	±%
Labour	Colin Quinney	1,370	42.6	+8.0
Conservative	Frances Lasok	761	23.6	+6.0
Liberal Democrats	Hugh Foden	539	16.7	–12.8
Green	Ignaty Dyakov-Richmond	431	13.4	+1.2
Independent	Hafeez Ahmed	103	3.2	N/A
SDP	Joshua Payne	16	0.5	N/A
Majority		609	29.0	
Rejected ballots		27	0.8	
Turnout		3,247	43.2	
Registered electors		7,521		
Labour hold		Swing	▲1.0	

The by-election followed the resignation of Labour councillor Jerry Weber.

==== Whitnash ====
Whitnash by-election, 2 December 2021
Party	Candidate	Votes	%	±%
Whitnash Residents	Adrian Barton	835	55.2	+5.7
Labour	Lucy Phillips	431	28.5	+6.5
Conservative	John Kane	127	8.4	+1.8
Green	Sarah Richards	88	5.8	−4.7
Liberal Democrats	Trevor Barr	32	2.1	−2.9
Majority		404	26.7	
Rejected ballots		2	0.1	
Turnout		1,526	20.6	
Whitnash Residents hold		Swing	▼0.4	

The by-election followed the death of Whitnash Residents Association councillor Tony Heath.

==== Leamington Clarendon (June 2022) ====
Leamington Clarendon by-election, 16 June 2022
Party	Candidate	Votes	%	±%
Labour	Christopher King	1,064	49.0	+14.5
Liberal Democrats	Justine Ragany	612	28.2	–1.3
Conservative	Frances Lasok	365	16.8	–0.8
Green	Ignaty Dyakov-Richmond	105	4.8	–7.4
UK Independence Party (UKIP)	Gerald Smith	24	1.1	–5.2
Majority		452	20.8	
Rejected ballots		6	0.3	
Turnout		2,176	28.8	
Registered electors		7,566		
Labour hold		Swing	▲7.9	

The by-election followed the death of Labour councillor Jonathan Nicholls following a car accident.
