= 2017 Warwickshire County Council election =

2017 UK local government election

- 4 May 2017

All 57 seats to Warwickshire County Council 29 seats needed for a majority
	First party	Second party	Third party
Party	Conservative	Labour	Liberal Democrats
Last election	26	22	9
Seats won	36	10	7
Seat change	▲10	▼12	▼2
- Map showing the results of the 2017 Warwickshire County Council elections.
Council control before election
No Overall Control
Council control after election
Conservative Party

The 2017 Warwickshire County Council election took place as part of the 2017 local elections in the UK. All 57 councillors were elected for single-member electoral divisions for a four-year term. The voting system used was first-past-the-post.

Boundary changes took effect at this election after a review by the Local Government Boundary Commission for England.

The result was Conservative councillors formed a majority of 15 on the council which had been three seats short of any single political grouping's control before the election. The second-largest party became ten councillors of the Labour Party and the balance of the council became formed by seven Liberal Democrats.

== Results summary ==
Warwickshire County Council election, 2017
Party	Seats	Gains	Losses	Net gain/loss	Seats %	Votes %	Votes	+/−
Conservative	36			+10		49.1	76,519	
Labour	10			-12		23.6	36,678	
Liberal Democrats	7			-2		16.2	25,265	
Green	2			-		7.5	11,666	
Other parties	2			-1		1.0	1,505	
UKIP	0			-		2.6	4,090	

== North Warwickshire ==
North Warwickshire had 7 seats.

Atherstone
Party	Candidate	Votes	%	±%
Labour	Neil Dirveiks	834	41.0	
Conservative	Mark Simpson	817	40.2	
UKIP	Robert Gisbourne	313	15.4	
Green	Aaron Gibson	69	3.4	
Majority		17	0.8	−
Turnout		2,033	29.8	
Labour win (new seat)				

Baddesley and Dordon
Party	Candidate	Votes	%	±%
Conservative	Andy Wright	1,315	55.5	
Labour	Peter Morson	982	41.4	
Green	Ian Davidson	73	3.1	
Majority		333	14.1	
Turnout		2,370	31.8	
Conservative win (new seat)				

Coleshill North & Water Orton
Party	Candidate	Votes	%	±%
Conservative	Dave Reilly	1,676	62.5	
Labour	Adam Farrell	935	34.9	
Green	James Barrett	70	2.6	
Majority		741	27.6	
Turnout		2,681	40.4	
Conservative win (new seat)				

Coleshill South & Arley
Party	Candidate	Votes	%	±%
Conservative	Colin Hayfield	1,732	68.0	
Labour	Carl Jerromes	697	27.4	
Green	Nick Brierley	118	4.6	
Majority		1035	40.6	
Turnout		2,547	35.9	
Conservative win (new seat)				

Hartshill & Mancetter
Party	Candidate	Votes	%	±%
Conservative	Margaret Bell	1,155	52.0	
Labour	Chris Clark	799	36.1	
UKIP	Richard Freer	183	8.3	
Green	Ian Bourne	79	3.6	
Majority		356	15.9	−
Turnout		2,216	31.3	
Conservative win (new seat)				

Kingsbury
Party	Candidate	Votes	%	±%
Conservative	Andy Jenns	1,471	58.8	
Labour	Jacqueline Chambers	611	24.4	
Independent	Brian Moss	346	13.8	
Green	Julia Hart	72	3.0	
Majority		860	34.4	−
Turnout		2,500	36.0	
Conservative win (new seat)				

Polesworth
Party	Candidate	Votes	%	±%
Labour	Dave Parsons	1,191	50.3	
Conservative	Dave Humphreys	1073	45.3	
Green	Alix Dearing	103	4.4	
Majority		118		
Turnout		2367	31.9	
Labour win (new seat)				

== Nuneaton and Bedworth ==
Nuneaton and Bedworth had 13 seats.

Arbury
Party	Candidate	Votes	%	±%
Conservative	Clare Golby	1,249	57.4	
Labour	Steve Hey	782	35.9	
Green	Mike Wright	147	6.7	
Majority		467	21.5	
Turnout		2178	30.13	
Conservative win (new seat)				

Attleborough
Party	Candidate	Votes	%	±%
Conservative	Andy Sargeant	1,086	49.0	
Labour	June Tandy	956	43.1	
Green	Sophie Bonner	176	7.9	
Majority		130	5.9	
Turnout		2218		
Conservative win (new seat)				

Bedworth Central
Party	Candidate	Votes	%	±%
Labour	Richard Chattaway	1,076	50.9	
Conservative	Kyle Evans	809	38.3	
UKIP	Craig Carpenter	181	8.6	
Green	Sarah Richards	47	2.2	
Majority		267	12.6	
Turnout		2113		
Labour win (new seat)				

Bedworth East
Party	Candidate	Votes	%	±%
Conservative	Bhagwant Pandher	971	45.6	
Labour	Julie Jackson	909	42.7	
Independent	Steve Young	171	8.0	
Green	James Alty	79	3.7	
Majority		62	2.9	
Turnout		2130		
Conservative win (new seat)				

Bedworth North
Party	Candidate	Votes	%	±%
Conservative	Seb Gran	1,549	64.1	
Labour	Bob Copland	765	31.7	
Green	Theresa Brookes	102	4.2	
Majority		784	32.4	
Turnout		2416		
Conservative win (new seat)				

Bedworth West
Party	Candidate	Votes	%	±%
Conservative	Pete Gilbert	1,155	49.3	
Labour	Ian Lloyd	947	40.5	
UKIP	Andrew Wilson	133	5.7	
Green	Merle Gering	106	4.5	
Majority		208	8.8	
Turnout		2341		
Conservative win (new seat)				

Bulkington & Whitestone
Party	Candidate	Votes	%	±%
Conservative	Jeff Morgan	2,461	71.2	
Labour	John Beaumont	816	23.6	
Green	Laurel Brindley	180	5.2	
Majority		1645	47.6	
Turnout		3467		
Conservative win (new seat)				

Camp Hill
Party	Candidate	Votes	%	±%
Labour	Corrine Davies	777	47.2	
Conservative	Olu Tokode	506	30.7	
UKIP	Tony Grant	211	12.8	
Green	Christopher Brookes	152	9.3	
Majority		271		
Turnout		1646		
Labour win (new seat)				

Galley Common
Party	Candidate	Votes	%	±%
Conservative	Dan Gissane	1,254	56.87	
Labour	Philip Johnson	675	30.61	
UKIP	Ray Wilkinson	167	7.26	
Green	Amanda Hotley	114	5.17	
Majority		579	26.26	
Turnout		2205	28.1	
Conservative win (new seat)				

Nuneaton Abbey
Party	Candidate	Votes	%	±%
Labour	Bill Olner	1,690	67.17	
Conservative	Sajid Sayed	602	23.93	
Green	Ian Bonner	213	8.14	
Majority		1,088	43.24	
Turnout		2516	32.71	
Labour win (new seat)				

Nuneaton East
Party	Candidate	Votes	%	±%
Conservative	Jeff Clarke	1,949	63.44	
Green	Michele Kondakor	649	21.13	
Labour	Andrew Crichton	462	15.21	
Majority		1,300	42.31	
Turnout		3587	42.11	
Conservative win (new seat)				

Stockingford
Party	Candidate	Votes	%	±%
Labour	Caroline Phillips	952	50.4	
Conservative	Jamie Cummings	776	41.1	
Green	Maggie Morrissey	162	8.6	
Majority		176	9.3	
Turnout		1890		
Labour win (new seat)				

Weddington
Party	Candidate	Votes	%	±%
Green	Keith Kondakor	1,658	46.3	
Conservative	Rob Tromans	1,521	42.5	
Labour	Brian Walmsley	400	11.2	
Majority		137	3.8	
Turnout		3579		
Green win (new seat)				

== Rugby ==
Rugby had 13 seats.

Admirals & Cawston
Party	Candidate	Votes	%	±%
Conservative	Peter Butlin	1,412	52.1	
Labour	Ish Mistry	822	30.4	
Liberal Democrats	Lee Chase	227	8.4	
UKIP	Frank McGowan	144	5.3	
Green	Judith Barrett	103	3.8	
Majority		590	21.7	
Turnout		2708		
Conservative win (new seat)				

Benn
Party	Candidate	Votes	%	±%
Labour	Alan Webb	1,054	54.1	
Conservative	Charlie Hull	502	25.7	
Liberal Democrats	Hugh Trimble	189	9.7	
Green	Graham Bliss	137	7.0	
TUSC	Marian Wakelin	68	3.5	
Majority		552	28.4	
Turnout		1950		
Labour win (new seat)				

Bilton & Hillside
Party	Candidate	Votes	%	±%
Conservative	Kam Kaur	1,691	49.2	
Liberal Democrats	Noreen New	1,146	33.4	
Labour	Howard Davis	446	13.0	
Green	Kate Crowley	151	4.4	
Majority		545	15.8	
Turnout		3434		
Conservative win (new seat)				

Brownsover & Coton Park
Party	Candidate	Votes	%	±%
Conservative	Jill Simpson-Vince	1,007	47.3	
Labour	Mary Webb	802	37.7	
Liberal Democrats	Jerome Perrier	167	7.8	
Green	Peter Reynolds	153	7.2	
Majority		205	9.6	
Turnout		2129		
Conservative win (new seat)				

Dunsmore & Leam Valley
Party	Candidate	Votes	%	±%
Conservative	Howard Roberts	2,636	75.1	
Labour	Bob Hughes	434	12.4	
Liberal Democrats	Laura Slinn	294	8.4	
Green	James Harrison	145	4.1	
Majority		1,562	48.8	
Turnout		3509		
Conservative win (new seat)				

Earl Craven
Party	Candidate	Votes	%	±%
Conservative	Heather Timms	1,735	66.1	
Labour	Scott Prior	580	22.1	
UKIP	John Birch	168	6.4	
Green	Felicity Rock	143	5.4	
Majority		1,155	44.0	
Turnout		3203		
Conservative win (new seat)				

Eastlands
Party	Candidate	Votes	%	±%
Liberal Democrats	Jerry Roodhouse	1,584	54.0	
Conservative	Tony Meeson	745	25.4	
Labour	Matt Weston	507	17.3	
Green	Ellie Roderick	99	3.4	
Majority		545	15.8	
Turnout		2935		
Liberal Democrats win (new seat)				

Fosse
Party	Candidate	Votes	%	±%
Conservative	Adrian Warwick	2,188	68.3	
Labour	Kieren Brown	626	19.5	
Liberal Democrats	Trisha Trimble	260	8.1	
Green	Peggy Wiseman	129	4.0	
Majority		1,562	48.8	
Turnout		3203		
Conservative win (new seat)				

Hillmorton
Party	Candidate	Votes	%	±%
Conservative	Yousef Dahmash	1,625	55.9	
Labour	Jim Ellis	739	25.4	
Liberal Democrats	Craig McQueen	426	14.7	
Green	Julie-Ann Machin	116	4.0	
Majority		886	30.5	
Turnout		2906		
Conservative win (new seat)				

New Bilton & Overslade
Party	Candidate	Votes	%	±%
Labour	Maggie O'Rourke	1,019	45.9	
Conservative	Sara Last	715	32.2	
Liberal Democrats	Neil Sandison	333	15.0	
Green	Roy Sandison	111	5.0	
TUSC	Julie Weekes	44	2.0	
Majority		304	13.7	
Turnout		2222		
Labour win (new seat)				

== Stratford-on-Avon ==
Stratford-on-Avon had 13 seats.

Alcester
Party	Candidate	Votes	%	±%
Conservative	Mark Cargill	1,841	55.2	
Liberal Democrats	Susan Juned	1,227	36.8	
Labour	Andrew Foster	161	4.8	
Green	Duncan Parker	106	3.2	
Majority		614	18.4	
Turnout		3335		
Conservative win (new seat)				

Arden
Party	Candidate	Votes	%	±%
Conservative	John Horner	2,451	81.6	
Liberal Democrats	Karyl Rees	365	12.2	
Green	Mark Griffiths	187	6.2	
Majority		2,086	69.4	
Turnout		3003		
Conservative win (new seat)				

Bidford & Welford
Party	Candidate	Votes	%	±%
Conservative	Mike Brain	1,945	59.0	
Liberal Democrats	William Horton	702	21.3	
Labour	Cat Price	323	9.8	
UKIP	Graham Porter	178	5.4	
Green	Debbie Griffiths	150	4.5	
Majority		1,243	37.7	
Turnout		3298		
Conservative win (new seat)				

Feldon
Party	Candidate	Votes	%	±%
Conservative	Bob Stevens	1,901	66.3	
Liberal Democrats	Bev Veasey-Walshe	436	15.2	
Labour	Matthew Panton	356	12.4	
Green	Pat Hotson	174	6.1	
Majority		590	21.7	
Turnout		2624		
Conservative win (new seat)				

Kineton & Red Horse
Party	Candidate	Votes	%	±%
Conservative	Chris Williams	1,351	45.0	
Liberal Democrats	Laura Steele	1,218	40.5	
Labour	Patrick Jenkins	178	5.9	
UKIP	Edward Fila	143	4.8	
Green	Rob Ballantyne	114	3.8	
Majority		133	4.5	
Turnout		3004		
Conservative win (new seat)				

Shipston
Party	Candidate	Votes	%	±%
Conservative	Jo Barker	2,011	65.7	
Liberal Democrats	Roger Billins	647	21.1	
Labour	John Hartigan	227	7.4	
Green	Dave Passingham	176	5.7	
Majority		1364	44.6	
Turnout		3061		
Conservative win (new seat)				

Southam, Stockton & Napton
Party	Candidate	Votes	%	±%
Conservative	Andy Crump	1,854	70.7	
Labour	Ros Grant	514	19.6	
Green	Derek Price	129	4.9	
Liberal Democrats	Andrew Milton	127	4.8	
Majority		590	21.7	
Turnout		2624		
Conservative win (new seat)				

Stour & the Vale
Party	Candidate	Votes	%	±%
Conservative	Izzi Seccombe	1,862	74.2	
Liberal Democrats	Di Walden	278	11.1	
Labour	Jan Sewell	199	7.9	
Green	Dean Jones	171	6.8	
Majority		1,584	63.1	
Turnout		2510		
Conservative win (new seat)				

Stratford North
Party	Candidate	Votes	%	±%
Stratford First	Edward Keith Lloyd	876	33.1	
Conservative	Anthony Jefferson	753	28.4	
Liberal Democrats	Dominic Skinner	640	24.2	
Labour	John Allan Hartley	244	9.2	
Green	John David Stott	134	5.1	
Majority		123	4.7	
Turnout		2647		
Stratford First win (new seat)				

Stratford South
Party	Candidate	Votes	%	±%
Liberal Democrats	Kate Rolfe	1,949	51.8	
Conservative	Philip Applin	1,437	38.2	
Labour	Emma Bradley	258	6.9	
Green	Tony Dennis	119	3.2	
Majority		512	13.6	
Turnout		3763		
Liberal Democrats win (new seat)				

Stratford West
Party	Candidate	Votes	%	±%
Liberal Democrats	Jenny Fradgley	1,608	59.1	
Conservative	Jonathan Gullis	849	31.2	
Labour	Eleanor Whitehead	177	6.5	
Green	John Riley	86	3.2	
Majority		759	17.9	
Turnout		2720		
Liberal Democrats win (new seat)				

Studley
Party	Candidate	Votes	%	±%
Liberal Democrats	Clive Rickhards	1,195	44.2	
Conservative	Justin Kerridge	1,170	43.3	
Labour	Chris Pilkington	270	10.0	
Green	Alistair Goddon	67	2.5	
Majority		25	0.9	
Turnout		2702		
Liberal Democrats win (new seat)				

Wellesbourne
Party	Candidate	Votes	%	±%
Conservative	Anne Parry	1,852	53.7	
Liberal Democrats	David Johnston	1,201	34.8	
Labour	James Briggs	163	4.7	
UKIP	Frank Rietz	122	3.5	
Green	Roger Fisher	110	3.2	
Majority		651	18.9	
Turnout		3448		
Conservative win (new seat)				

== Warwick ==
Warwick had 14 seats.

Budbrooke & Bishop's Tachbrook
Party	Candidate	Votes	%	±%
Conservative	Les Caborn	2,082	66.5	
Labour	Colin Quinney	533	17.0	
Liberal Democrats	John Cooper	361	11.5	
Green	Derrick Knight	155	5.0	
Majority		1,549	49.5	
Turnout		3131		
Conservative win (new seat)				

Cubbington & Leek Wootton
Party	Candidate	Votes	%	±%
Conservative	Wallace Redford	1,725	62.3	
Labour	Nicholas Hoten	465	16.8	
Liberal Democrats	Helen James	302	10.9	
Green	Chris Philpott	275	9.9	
Majority		1,260	45.5	
Turnout		2767		
Conservative win (new seat)				

Kenilworth Park Hill
Party	Candidate	Votes	%	±%
Conservative	Dave Shilton	1,591	53.1	
Liberal Democrats	Rachel Clayton	699	23.3	
Labour	Audrey Mullender	390	13.0	
Green	John Dearing	317	10.6	
Majority		892	29.8	
Turnout		2997		
Conservative win (new seat)				

Kenilworth St John's
Party	Candidate	Votes	%	±%
Conservative	Alan Cockburn	1,486	42.3	
Liberal Democrats	Richard Dickson	1,385	39.4	
Labour	Wallace McDowell	378	10.8	
Green	Pippa Austin	162	4.6	
UKIP	Martin Mackenzie	102	2.9	
Majority		101	2.9	
Turnout		3513		
Conservative win (new seat)				

Lapworth & West Kenilworth
Party	Candidate	Votes	%	±%
Conservative	John Cooke	1,602	60.3	
Liberal Democrats	Kate Dickson	655	24.7	
Labour	Joshua Payne	246	9.3	
Green	Samuel Porter	96	3.6	
UKIP	Ian Tyres	58	2.2	
Majority		947	35.6	
Turnout		2657		
Conservative win (new seat)				

Leamington Brunswick
Party	Candidate	Votes	%	±%
Green	Jonathan Chilvers	1,340	55.3	
Labour	Jojo Norris	774	31.9	
Conservative	Samuel Carter	233	9.6	
Liberal Democrats	Louis Adam	78	3.2	
Majority		566	23.4	
Turnout		2425		
Green win (new seat)				

Leamington Clarendon
Party	Candidate	Votes	%	±%
Liberal Democrats	Nicola Davies	998	34.1	
Conservative	Elizabeth Phillips	944	32.2	
Labour	Jerry Weber	771	26.3	
Green	Will Roberts	139	4.7	
UKIP	Gerry Smith	76	2.6	
Majority		54	1.9	
Turnout		2928		
Liberal Democrats win (new seat)				

Leamington Milverton
Party	Candidate	Votes	%	±%
Liberal Democrats	Bill Gifford	1,907	58.8	
Conservative	Anne-Marie Campion	839	25.9	
Labour	Andy Marshall	383	11.8	
Green	Will Bryce	116	3.6	
Majority		1,068	32.9	
Turnout		3245		
Liberal Democrats win (new seat)				

Leamington North
Party	Candidate	Votes	%	±%
Liberal Democrats	Sarah Boad	1,501	43.9	
Labour	Diana Taulbut	960	28.1	
Conservative	Stacey Calder	835	24.4	
Green	Marcia Watson	126	3.7	
Majority		541	15.8	
Turnout		3422		
Liberal Democrats win (new seat)				

Leamington Willes
Party	Candidate	Votes	%	±%
Labour	Matt Western	1,244	45.9	
Green	Martin Luckhurst	940	34.7	
Conservative	Sean Rose	430	15.9	
Liberal Democrats	Simon Wheeler	95	3.5	
Majority		304	11.2	
Turnout		2709		
Labour win (new seat)				

Warwick North
Party	Candidate	Votes	%	±%
Conservative	Pam Williams	1,172	45.1	
Labour	Helen Adkins	1,011	38.9	
Liberal Democrats	Chris Begg	177	6.8	
UKIP	Alastair MacBrayne	141	5.4	
Green	Tracey Drew	99	3.8	
Majority		161	6.2	
Turnout		2600		
Conservative win (new seat)				

Warwick South
Party	Candidate	Votes	%	±%
Conservative	Parminder Birdi	1,409	49.8	
Liberal Democrats	Kelvin Lambert	579	20.4	
Labour	Serhan Wade	486	17.2	
Green	Matt Swift	195	6.9	
UKIP	Mark Skinner	163	5.8	
Majority		830	29.4	
Turnout		2832		
Conservative win (new seat)				

Warwick West
Party	Candidate	Votes	%	±%
Labour	John Holland	1,263	41.6	
Conservative	Clare Hopkinson	1,259	41.5	
Liberal Democrats	Dale Cox	268	8.8	
UKIP	Bob Dhillon	137	4.5	
Green	Pam Lunn	109	3.6	
Majority		4	0.1	
Turnout		3036		
Labour win (new seat)				

Whitnash
Party	Candidate	Votes	%	±%
Whitnash Residents	Judy Falp	1,154	47.9	
Labour	Dave Rawcliffe	419	17.4	
Independent	Adrian Barton	323	13.4	
Conservative	Jules Morgan	253	10.5	
Green	Eloise Chilvers	218	9.1	
Liberal Democrats	Chris Walsh	41	1.7	
Majority		735	30.5	
Turnout		2408		
Whitnash Residents win (new seat)				
