= Warwickshire County Council =

UK non-metropolitan county council

Type
- Type: Non-metropolitan county

History
- Succeeded by: North Warwickshire (2029); South Warwickshire (2029)

Leadership
- Chair: Dale Keeling, Conservative since 5 February 2026
- Leader: George Finch, Reform UK since 25 June 2025
- Chief Executive: Monica Fogarty since October 2018

Structure
- Seats: 57 councillors
- Political groups: Administration (17) Reform UK (17) Other parties (40) Liberal Democrats (14) Conservative (9) Green (6) Restore Britain (4) Independent (3) Labour (3) Whitnash Residents Association (1)
- Length of term: 4 years

Elections
- Voting system: First past the post
- Last election: 1 May 2025
- Next election: To be abolished

Meeting place
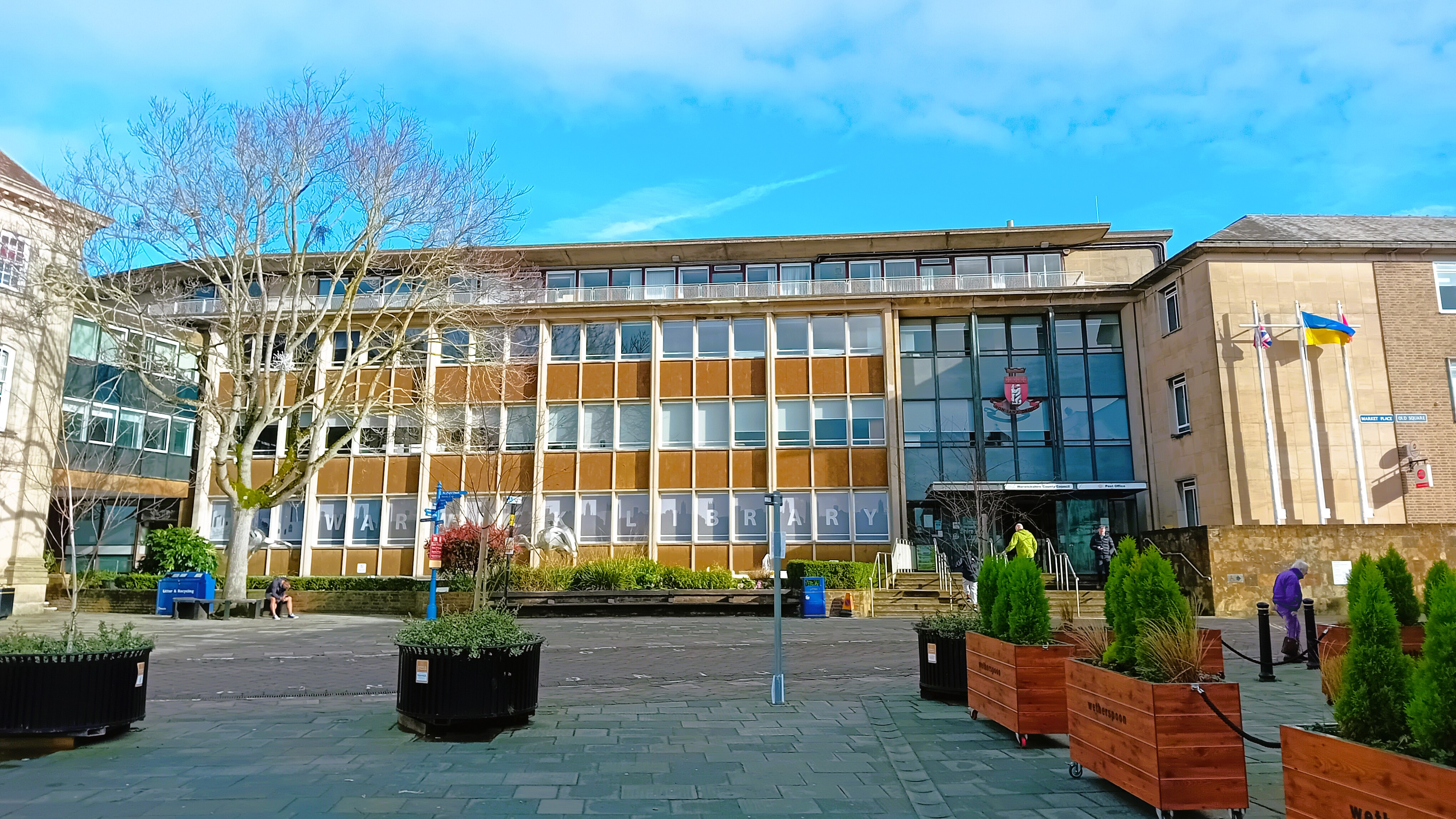
- Shire Hall, Market Place, Warwick, CV34 4RL

Website
- www.warwickshire.gov.uk

Warwickshire County Council is the county council that governs the non-metropolitan county of Warwickshire in England. Its headquarters are at Shire Hall in the centre of Warwick, the county town. The council's principal functions are county roads and rights of way, social services, education and libraries, but it also provides numerous other local government services in its area. The council has been under no overall control since the 2025 election, being run by a Reform UK minority administration.

== History ==
Elected county councils were created in 1889 under the Local Government Act 1888, taking over many administrative functions which had previously been performed by unelected magistrates at the quarter sessions. The cities of Birmingham and Coventry were considered large enough for their existing councils to provide county-level services, and so they were made county boroughs, independent from Warwickshire County Council. (Note: Coventry had previously been a similar county corporate, having its own sheriffs from 1451 until 1842, when it had been brought back under the jurisdiction of the Sheriff of Warwickshire.) The 1888 Act also said that any urban sanitary districts which straddled county boundaries were to be placed entirely in the county which had the majority of that district's population, which saw Warwickshire cede its part of Hinckley to Leicestershire, its part of Redditch to Worcestershire, and its part of Tamworth to Staffordshire. Warwickshire County Council was elected by and provided services to the parts of the county (as thus adjusted) outside the county boroughs of Birmingham and Coventry. The county council's area was termed the administrative county.

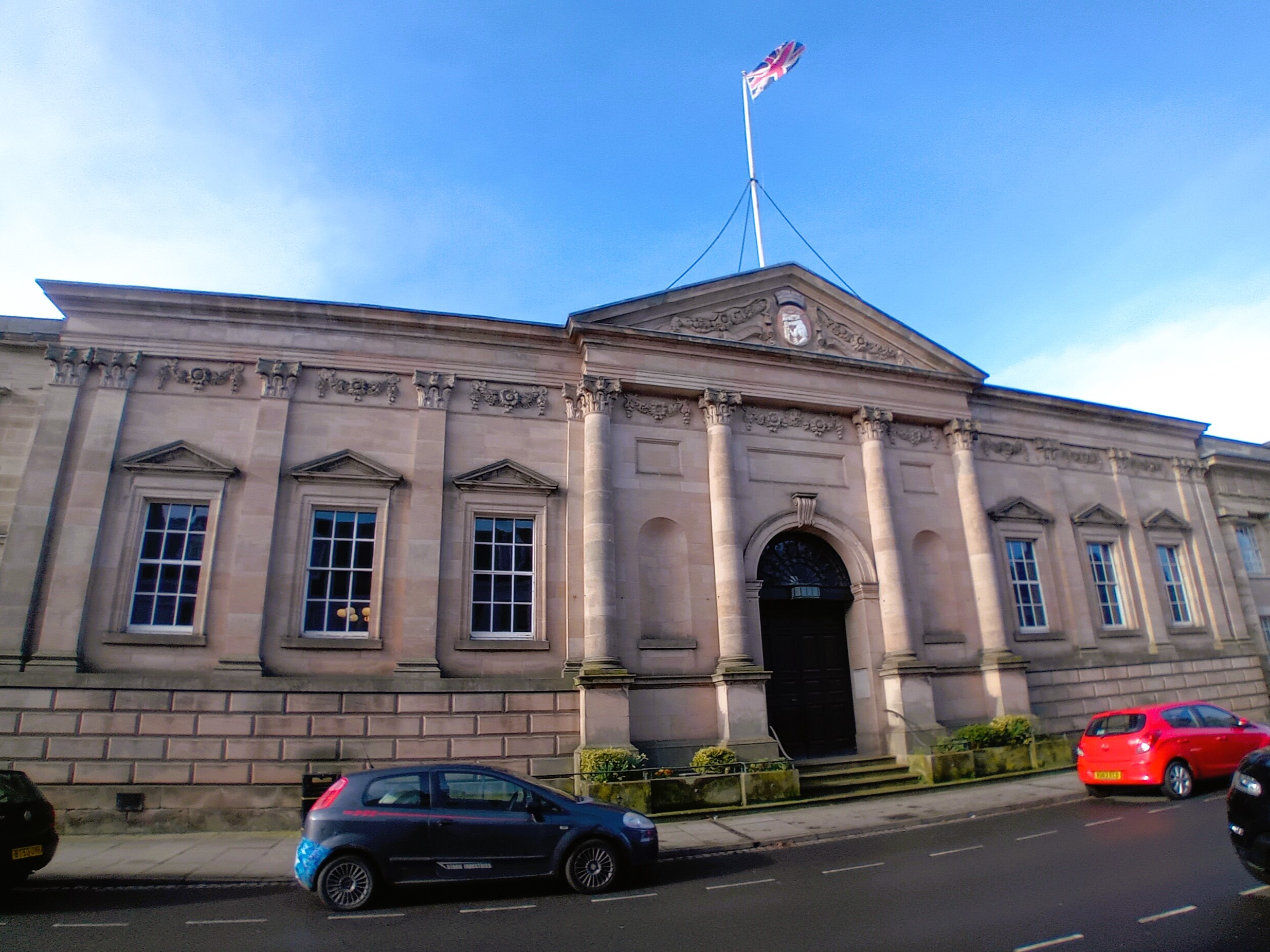
Shire Hall, Warwick: The 1758 courthouse, facing Northgate Street.

The first elections to the county council were held in January 1889 and it formally came into being on 1 April 1889. On that day it held its first official meeting at the Shire Hall in Warwick, the courthouse (built 1758) which had served as the meeting place for the quarter sessions which preceded the county council. John Dugdale, the Conservative MP for Nuneaton, was appointed the first chairman of the council.

The administrative county ceded Aston Manor and Erdington to Birmingham in 1911. Solihull was made a county borough in 1964.

The administrative county was reformed in 1974 to become a non-metropolitan county, at which point it also ceded Sutton Coldfield, Hockley Heath and much of the Meriden Rural District to the new West Midlands metropolitan county, which also covered the already independent county boroughs of Birmingham, Coventry and Solihull, alongside other territory from Staffordshire and Worcestershire. The lower tier of local government was reorganised as part of the same reforms. Previously it had comprised numerous boroughs, urban districts and rural districts; they were reorganised into five non-metropolitan districts.

The council became the centre of a national controversy following comments made by three Conservative councillors during a committee meeting in January 2024 discussing spending on Special Educational Needs (SEND). Following media attention, the council published a statement and apologies from the three councillors. A subsequent investigation cleared all three councillors of having breached the council's code of conduct, but found that some of the language used by two of the councillors had not been respectful. The investigation recommended further training for councillors on how to "engage fully in debate at scrutiny and other committee meetings whilst ensuring that the language used is respectful, courteous, and sensitive to the matter concerned."

=== Abolition ===
In July 2026, as part of the 2027–28 local government reforms, the UK Government announced that it intends to abolish the existing county and district councils in Warwickshire, and divide it into two unitary authority areas by April 2028. The county will be divided north-south, with the northern area combining the current districts of North Warwickshire, Nuneaton and Bedworth, and Rugby, to form a new North Warwickshire unitary authority, and the southern area combining Warwick and Stratford-on-Avon to form a new South Warwickshire unitary authority. Elections to the new unitary councils will take place in May 2027.

== Governance ==
Warwickshire County Council provides county-level services. District-level services are provided by the five district councils:

- North Warwickshire Borough Council
- Nuneaton and Bedworth Borough Council
- Rugby Borough Council
- Stratford-on-Avon District Council
- Warwick District Council

Much of the county is also covered by civil parishes, which form a third tier of local government.

=== Political control ===
The council has been under no overall control since the 2025 election. Reform UK was the largest party following that election, and they subsequently formed a minority administration to run the council.

Political control of the council since the 1974 reforms has been as follows:

Party in control	Years
No overall control	1974–1977
Conservative	1977–1981
No overall control	1981–1989
Conservative	1989–1993
No overall control	1993–2009
Conservative	2009–2013
No overall control	2013–2017
Conservative	2017–2025
No overall control	2025–present

=== Leadership ===
The leaders of the council since 1967 have been:

Councillor	Party	From	To
William Dugdale	Conservative	1967	24 Feb 1976
Michael Hammon	Conservative	Apr 1976	May 1981
Pat Martin	Conservative	1 Jun 1981	Feb 1983
John Brindley	Conservative	May 1983	May 1984
John Vereker	Conservative	May 1984	20 May 1993
Ian Bottrill	Labour	20 May 1993	May 2005
Alan Farnell	Conservative	17 May 2005	May 2013
Izzi Seccombe	Conservative	21 May 2013	May 2025
Rob Howard	Reform	16 May 2025	25 Jun 2025
George Finch	Reform	25 Jun 2025	present

=== Composition ===
The last election to the council was in 2025. Since the election, three councillors have been suspended from or left their groups and four have defected to Restore Britain.

Party	Councillors		
Party	Elected	Current	Difference
Reform	23	17	▼6
Liberal Democrats	14	14	Steady
Conservative	9	9	Steady
Green	7	6	▼1
Labour	3	3	Steady
Independent	0	3	▲3
Restore	0	4	▲4
Whitnash Residents	1	1	Steady
Total	57	57	Steady

== Elections ==
Since the last boundary changes in 2017 the council has been divided into 57 electoral divisions, each electing one councillor. Elections are held every four years.

== Premises ==
The county council is based at the Shire Hall in Market Place, Warwick, a complex of buildings built over many years. The oldest part was a courthouse built in 1758 facing Northgate Street. As the county council's functions grew it built new offices in 1929–32 on the adjoining site of the former county jail, retaining the jail's 1783 façade to Northgate Street. A large extension completed in 1958 included a new council chamber, and a further extension in 1966 created a new frontage and main entrance for the building facing Market Place.
