= Whitnash =

Town in Warwickshire, England

Coordinates: 52.268°N 1.524°W

- Town and civil parish
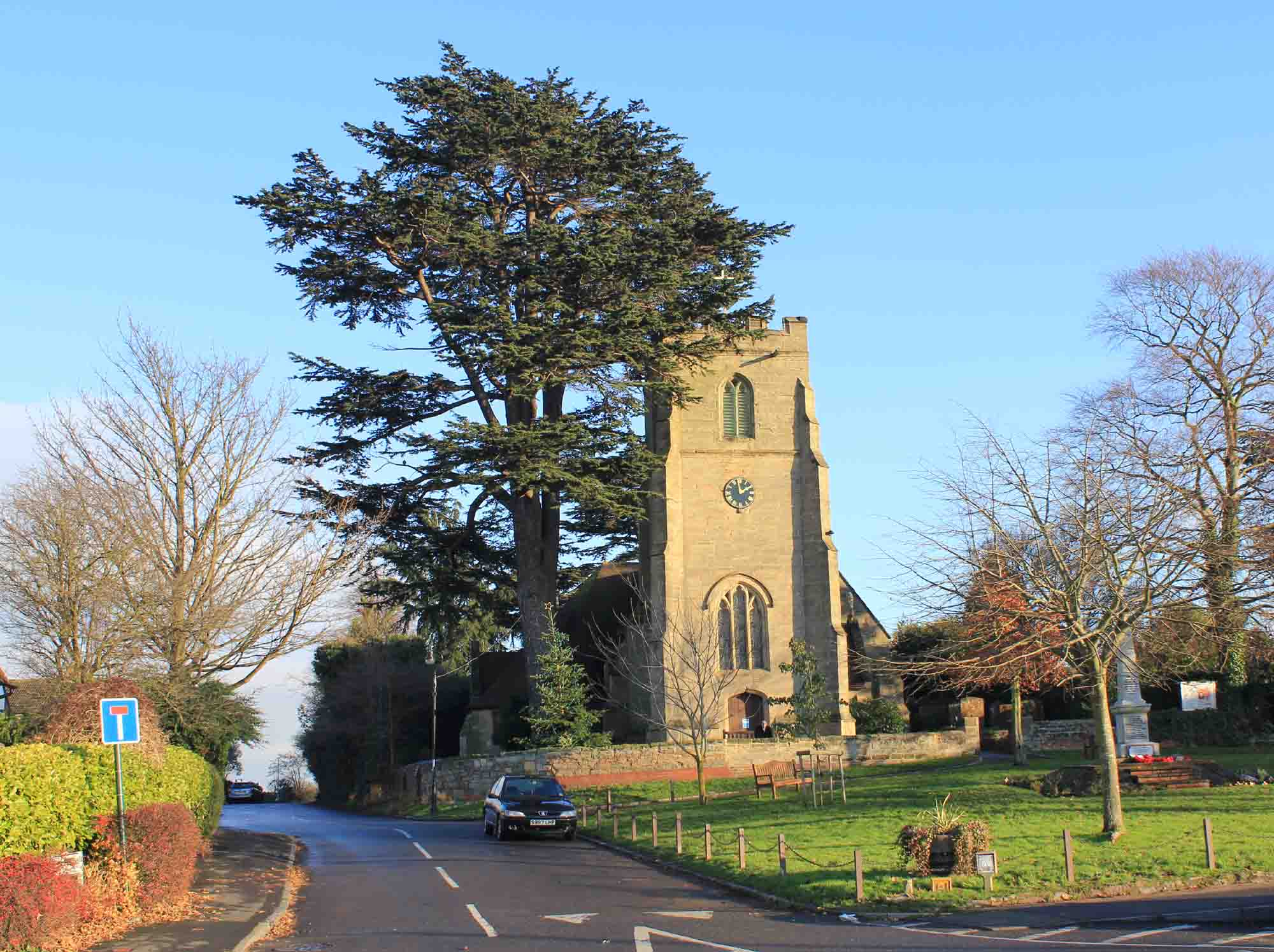
- St Margaret's Church

- Location within Warwickshire
- Interactive map showing the parish boundary
- Population: 10,743 (2021 census)
- District: Warwick
- Shire county: Warwickshire
- Region: West Midlands
- Country: England
- Sovereign state: United Kingdom
- Post town: Leamington Spa
- Postcode district: CV31
- Dialling code: 01926
- Police: Warwickshire
- Fire: Warwickshire
- Ambulance: West Midlands
- UK Parliament: Warwick and Leamington

Whitnash is a town and civil parish located southeast of, and contiguous with, Leamington Spa and Warwick in Warwickshire, England. The parish had a population of 10,743 at the 2021 census.

== History ==
Whitnash was mentioned in the Domesday Book as Witenas, by 1326 it had become Whitenasshe. As Whitnash is generally thought to derive from the Anglo-Saxon 'at the white ash' other derivations have included 'place by the wood', 'sacred ash' or the 'meeting place of the wise'. Whitnash has likely been settled since Celtic times. According to tradition, just east of the town there was a Celtic fortification in a field known as 'Castle Hill Field'. The parish church of St Margaret's is of Anglo-Saxon origin, and stands on a mound which may have been a pre-Christian pagan site, it was largely rebuilt between 1855 and 1880 to designs by Sir George Gilbert Scott.

Whitnash at one time had a holy well, located around 400 metres east of the town. According to a local legend, a church bell was dropped accidentally into the well when it was being taken there to be consecrated, according to the legend, the bell then gained the ability to foretell the future; at night time people would drop a stone into the well and ask a question. Then at daybreak it would give its answer: one ring for yes and two for no. The bell is commemorated in Whitnash's municipal crest.

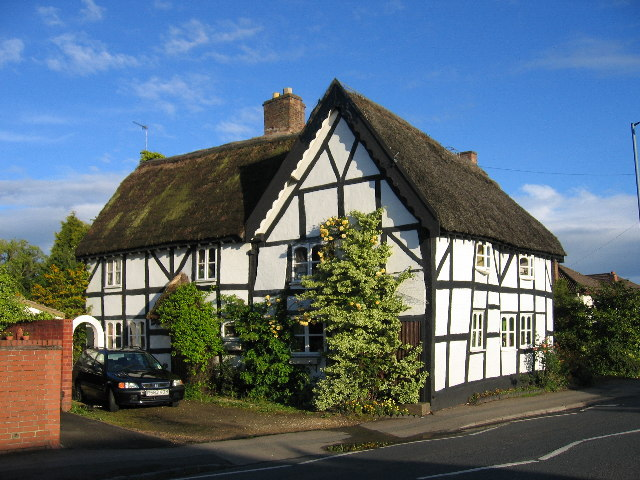
A thatched half timbered cottage in the old part of Whitnash

Whitnash was for most of its history a small village, the population in 1931 was 586. Around the historic core of the old village are a number of older half timbered buildings dating from the 17th century, including the Plough and Harrow inn. Until modern times, Whitnash was a fairly isolated community, which has led to it retaining a strong sense of local identity.

Dramatic population growth began during the second half of the 20th century. Reflecting its much larger size, in 1978 Whitnash became a town through the resolution of its parish council; thenceforth the parish council became a town council.

== Town centre ==
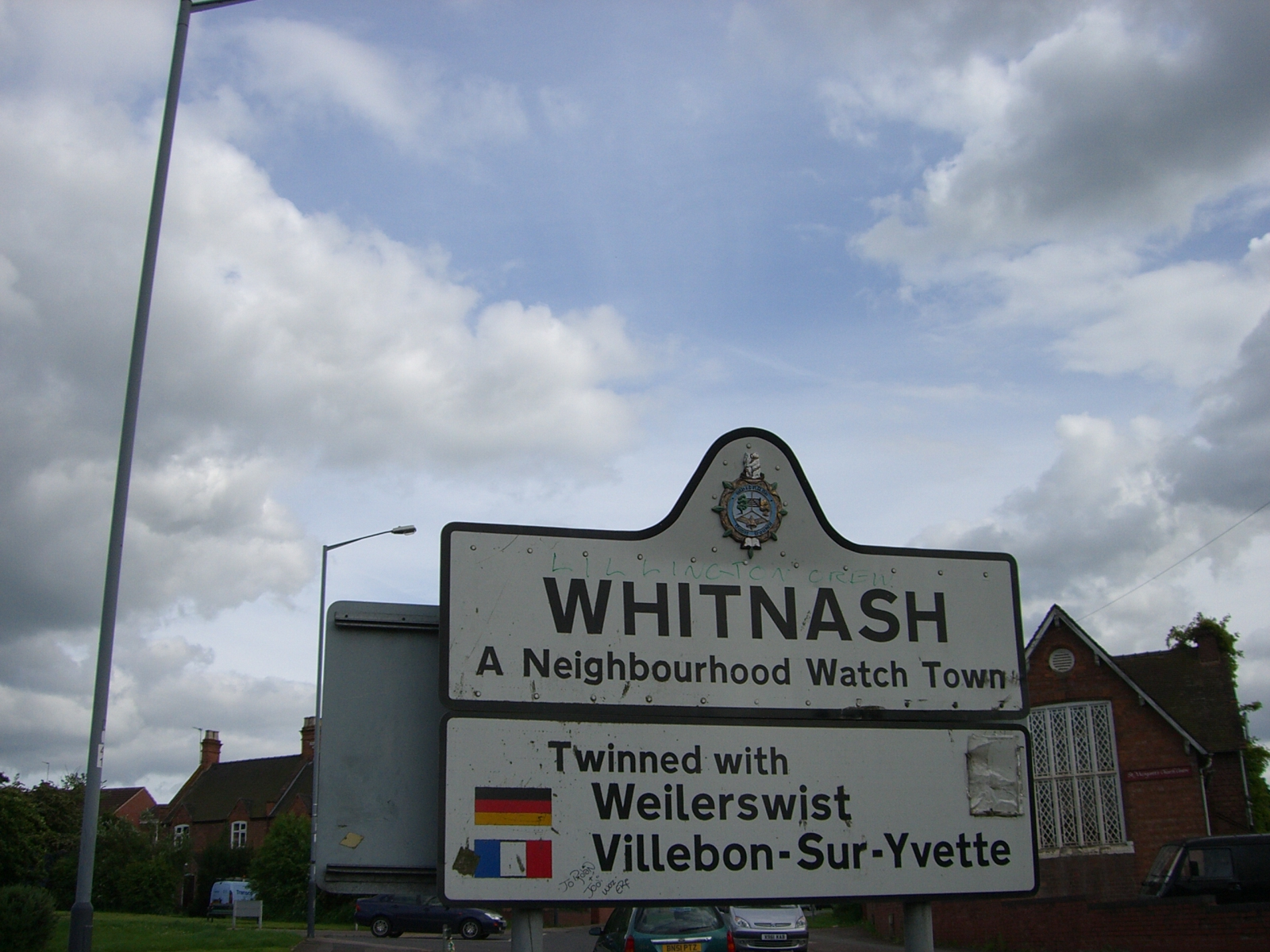
The Whitnash town sign as viewed from the Leamington Spa side

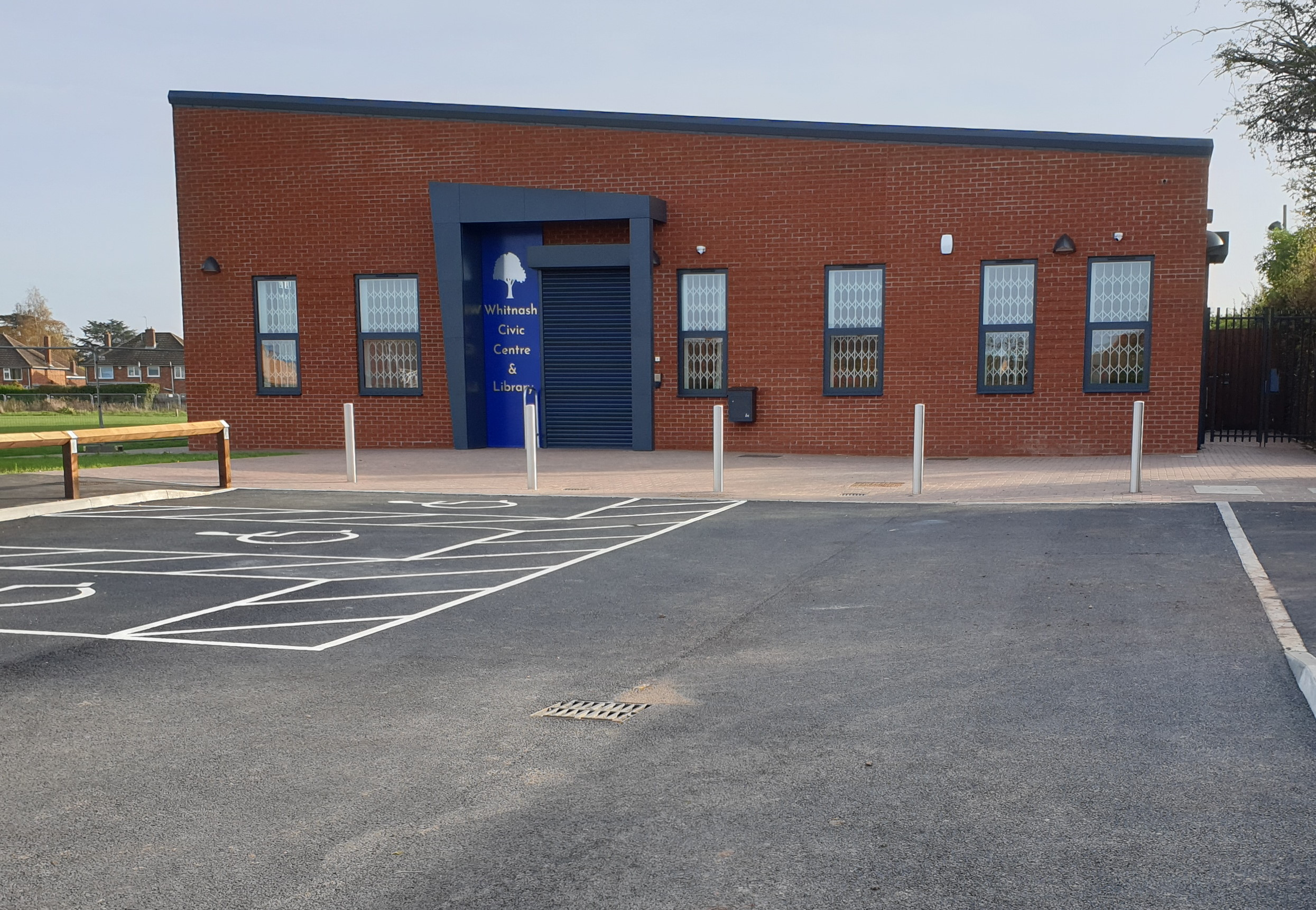
Whitnash Civic Centre, built in 2021 at Acre Close park

Whitnash does not have a well defined town centre as such; with Leamington Spa town centre only 2 miles to the north, a central district for Whitnash never developed, and the town expanded residentially only, around the small historic core around St. Margaret's Church. Whitnash has three neighbourhood shopping areas around Coppice Road, Heathcote Road /Acre Close and Home Farm Crescent. In November 2021, the town council completed development of its new civic centre and library, which has the town council office, library, café, conference room and sports hall suitable for badminton and other recreational activities.

== Education ==
There are four primary schools in the town: Whitnash Primary, St Joseph's RC Primary, St Margaret's Middle School and Briar Hill First School. There are no secondary schools located in Whitnash, but the state schools Campion School, Myton School and Trinity Catholic School name Whitnash as being within their priority areas.

== Politics ==
The Whitnash Residents Association dominates the local political scene, holding all the town's seats on Warwick District Council and Whitnash Town Council. It also holds the town's seat on Warwickshire County Council and has done for many years. The association was founded as the Whitnash Ratepayer's Association in 1977.

== Recreation ==
At the Whitnash Sports & Social Club, there is a petanque club and a lawn bowls club. Whitnash Town FC is the local association football club. The Leamington and County Golf Club is also within the parish. Since the new civic centre was built a number of activities now take place there, such as tai chi, short mat bowls and walking football.

== Transport ==
Stagecoach Midlands operates buses to Leamington and Warwick.

== Local media ==
Local news and television programmes are provided by BBC West Midlands and ITV Central. Television signals are received from the Sutton Coldfield TV transmitter.

Local radio stations are BBC CWR, Capital Mid-Counties, Hits Radio Coventry & Warwickshire, Fresh (Coventry & Warwickshire), Heart West Midlands, Smooth West Midlands, and Greatest Hits Radio Midlands.

Published by the town council from July 2003 until December 2022, Whitnash had a free quarterly news pamphlet called the Whitnash Tymes which was delivered to every residence in the town. Usually entailing messages from the mayor and local authorities, listings, local business advertisements, local news, and events.

== Demographics ==
At the 2021 census, Whitnash civil parish had a population of 10,743 people in 4,257 households. It recorded that 78.2% of residents were White, 15.5% were Asian, 0.9% were Black, 2.8% were Mixed, with 2.5% belonging to any other ethnic group. In terms of religion, 46.1% were Christian, 36.6% had no religion, 12% were Sikh, 3.2% were Hindu, and 1.5% Muslim.

Census population of Whitnash parish
Census	Population	Female	Male	Households	Source
2001	7,798	3,962	3,836	3,077	
2011	8,806	4,491	4,315	3,524	
2021	10,743	5,414	5,329	4,257	

== Twin towns ==
Whitnash is twinned with Weilerswist in Germany and Villebon-sur-Yvette in France. Whitnash no longer has an active twinning association, however, the towns remain twinned.
