= 2025 in United Kingdom politics and government =

A list of events relating to politics and government in the United Kingdom during 2025.

== Events ==
=== January ===
- 2 January –
  - Former Deputy Prime Minister Sir Nick Clegg announces he is standing down as Meta's president of global affairs after almost seven years.
  - Twenty Labour Party councillors on Broxtowe Borough Council in Nottinghamshire have resigned from Labour in protest at the direction of the party under Keir Starmer and will sit as independents.
  - Graham Sheldon resigns as leader of Oldham Council's Conservatives, and from the Conservative Party itself, after police were called to a heated council meeting on 18 December.
  - Kemi Badenoch calls for a public inquiry into grooming gangs.
- 3 January –
  - The UK government announces that the plans for reforms to social care in England may not be published until 2028, or later.
  - Zoe Hughes, a transgender member of Exeter City council, quits the Labour Party in a row over transgender issues.
- 4 January –
  - Reform UK leader Nigel Farage seeks to distance himself from Elon Musk's call for far-right activist Tommy Robinson to be released from prison.
  - At Reform's East of England Conference in Chelmsford, Farage threatens to target Conservative leader Kemi Badenoch's North West Essex seat over her allegations his party's membership figures are weak, and seems to show that the party now has 170,000 members.
- 5 January – In a post on Twitter, Elon Musk says that Nigel Farage "doesn't have what it takes" to lead Reform UK, remarks that Farage says stem from a disagreement over Musk's support for far-right activist Tommy Robinson.
- 6 January –
  - The Prime Minister responds to X owner Elon Musk and others he accuses of "spreading lies and misinformation" over grooming gangs. Starmer tells reporters that these online debates have now "crossed a line", resulting in threats against MPs, including Safeguarding Minister Jess Phillips.
  - MPs debate an online petition calling for a re-run of the 2024 general election in Westminster Hall, a secondary debating chamber.
  - Treasury Minister Tulip Siddiq refers herself to the Independent Adviser on Ministers' Interests after controversy over her links to her aunt's political movement in Bangladesh.
  - Justin Welby's tenure as Archbishop of Canterbury comes to an end following his resignation in November 2024. Archbishop of York Stephen Cottrell assumes temporary charge of the Church of England from the following day.
- 7 January – Minister Jess Phillips says Elon Musk is putting her in danger with misinformation about grooming gangs.
- 8 January –
  - MPs vote 364–111 against a Conservative proposal to require the UK government to establish an inquiry into grooming gangs.
  - The Liberal Democrats are ordered to pay £14,000 to Natalie Bird, a former parliamentary candidate who says she was driven out of the party and barred from standing as an MP over her gender-critical views.
  - Sir Oliver Robbins is appointed Permanent Secretary to the Foreign Office, succeeding Sir Philip Barton.
  - Patrick Harvie, the co-leader of the Scottish Greens, is to take time off from the Scottish Parliament because of a medical procedure.
  - Proposals are published to give Members of the Senedd a 6% pay rise, taking the wages for a backbench MS to £76,380 in 2025–26, up from £72,057.
- 9 January –
  - Former Prime Minister Liz Truss sends Keir Starmer a legal "cease and desist" letter demanding that he stop saying she "crashed the economy".
  - Mick Lynch announces his retirement as general secretary of the National Union of Rail, Maritime and Transport Workers.
- 10 January –
  - Local councils have until this date to decide whether to delay their participation in the May local elections.
  - Ten Reform UK councillors in Derbyshire resign from the party in protest at Nigel Farage's leadership, saying that the party is being run in an "increasingly autocratic manner" and "has lost its sense of direction" since Farage took over as leader. In response, Farage says the members were put forward by a "rogue branch" of the party and that "none of them passed vetting".
- 13 January –
  - Buckingham Palace confirms that King Charles III will travel to Auschwitz concentration camp to attend an event marking the 80th anniversary of its liberation on 27 January.
  - Michael Ellam is appointed at the Cabinet Office's second permanent secretary, European Union and International Economic Affairs.
  - As Chancellor Rachel Reeves faces mounting criticism over her handling of the economy against a backdrop of a falling pound and increases in government borrowing, Downing Street says she will remain in her role "for the whole of this Parliament".
  - In a social media post, former First Minister of Scotland Nicola Sturgeon announces that she and Peter Murrell, the former SNP chief executive, have "decided to end" their marriage and have been separated for some time.
  - According to Reform UK's website they now have 180,000 members.
- 14 January –
  - Tulip Siddiq resigns as Economic Secretary to the Treasury, over a scandal linked to the ousted government of Bangladesh. She becomes the second minister to resign from the Starmer ministry since the general election of July 2024. Emma Reynolds is appointed to replace her.
  - Helen Pitcher resigns as chair of the Criminal Cases Review Commission following criticism from government regarding her tenure in charge of the Commission, and moves to have her removed from the post.
  - Welsh Conservative leader Darren Millar accuses Senedd Presiding Officer Elin Jones of "inappropriately interrupting him" after she tells him to "tone down" a question about grooming gangs while he called for a fresh inquiry into child sexual abuse.
- 15 January –
  - Prime Minister Keir Starmer tells the House of Commons the UK government will look at "every conceivable way" to prevent Gerry Adams, the former President of Sinn Féin, from receiving compensation after it emerged that repealing the Troubles Legacy Act could allow him to claim compensation for unlawful detention during the 1970s.
  - Education Secretary Bridget Phillipson tells Parliament the UK government will proceed with the Higher Education (Freedom of Speech) Act 2023, which proposed fines for universities failing to uphold freedom of speech.
  - Eighteen local authorities have applied to delay their elections until 2026 amid proposals for major reorganisation.
  - Ed Davey calls for Britain to re-join the European Union Customs Union.
  - MP Joe Morris raises the topic of "Holly's Law" in Prime Minister's Questions.
- 16 January –
  - Keir Starmer signs a 100-year treaty with Ukraine in Kyiv.
  - Home Secretary Yvette Cooper announces plans for a nationwide review of grooming gangs including five government-backed local inquiries.
  - Kemi Badenoch criticises her predecessors for mishandling Brexit.
  - Downing Street clears Emma Reynolds to be City Minister despite her past work as a lobbyist.
  - MP Mike Amesbury admits to assault at Chester Magistrates' Court.
  - The White House announces that Ian Paisley Jr will attend the second inauguration of Donald Trump.
- 17 January –
  - The Greater London Authority is to investigate Mayor of London Sadiq Khan for his acceptance of tickets to a Taylor Swift concert.
  - Westminster's Strangers' Bar is to close for a safety and security review after a report that a woman had her drink spiked.
  - The Liberal Democrats urge the UK government to release analysis of the potential impact of the US imposing trade tariffs on the UK economy after US President-elect Donald Trump threatened to impose tariffs of up to 20% on global imports.
- 18 January – The BBC's Laura Kuenssberg reports that the Prime Minister has chaired a series of "mini-cabinet" meetings, along with the Chancellor, Foreign Secretary and Business Secretary, in an attempt to plan "for what might come" in terms of the effect on the UK during the Second Trump Presidency.
- 19 January –
  - Foreign Secretary David Lammy tells the BBC the prime minister will visit the United States within weeks to meet incoming US president Donald Trump.
  - Jeremy Corbyn and John McDonnell agree to be interviewed under caution by police following a pro-Palestinian rally in London. The police are investigating what they say was "a coordinated effort by organisers to breach conditions imposed on the event".
- 21 January –
  - Marcus Bokkerink is dismissed as chair of the Competition and Markets Authority amid concerns the group is not focussed enough on economic growth; Doug Gurr replaces him on a temporary basis.
  - First Minister of Wales Eluned Morgan tells the Senedd she is lobbying the UK government to give the Welsh Government powers over the Crown Estate in Wales, after a UK government minister suggested otherwise.
- 25 January – Sinn Féin lifts its suspension on Belfast City Councillor JJ Magee following an investigation by the Local Government Commissioner for Standards.
- 28 January –
  - Labour's Stephen Timms is reprimanded for attending a Muslim Council of Britain dinner despite official government advice being to not engage with the organisation.
  - Joe Fitzpatrick announces that he will not stand for re-election to the Scottish Parliament seat of Dundee City West at the 2026 Scottish Parliament election.
- 31 January – First Minister of Wales Eluned Morgan confirms she will contest the new seat of Ceredigion Penfro at the 2026 Senedd election.

=== February ===
- 3 February –
  - Prime Minister Keir Starmer rejects an allegation that he broke COVID-19 regulations by having a voice coach present at a press conference where he responded to a Brexit deal negotiated by Boris Johnson.
  - For the first time, Reform UK have led an opinion poll, after coming top with 25% in a YouGov poll for Sky News. Labour are second on 24%, with the Conservatives on 21%.
  - Northern Ireland's Economy Minister, Conor Murphy steps down from the post and announces he will leave Stormont after being elected to the Irish Seanad. Caoimhe Archibald is appointed to replace him as Economy Minister.
- 4 February –
  - BBC News reports that Jack Lopresti, the former Conservative MP for Filton and Bradley Stoke who lost the seat at the last general election has joined the Ukrainian military.
  - Welsh Conservatives leader Darren Millar and his colleague Russell George miss a Senedd vote on the Eluned Morgan government's budget for 2025–26 because they have travelled to the United States for the annual National Prayer Breakfast.
- 5 February –
  - Deputy Prime Minister Angela Rayner confirms that local elections in East Sussex, West Sussex, Essex, Thurrock, Hampshire, the Isle of Wight, Norfolk, Suffolk and Surrey will be delayed for a year to allow major local government reorganisations to take place.
  - Four of the seven MPs suspended from the Labour Party for voting against the child benefit cap are readmitted to the party; they are Richard Burgon, Ian Byrne, Imran Hussain and Rebecca Long-Bailey.
  - The Welsh Conservatives are absent from a Senedd debate concerning their former leader, Andrew RT Davies, but reject allegations they are boycotting the chamber's disciplinary process.
- 6 February – Chris McEleny is suspended as general secretary of the Alba Party following allegations of gross misconduct.
- 7 February – Reform UK chairman Zia Yusuf tells the BBC's Political Thinking podcast that history will judge Boris Johnson as one of the most damaging prime ministers in British history.
- 8 February – Health Minister Andrew Gwynne is sacked by the prime minister after the Mail on Sunday reported he sent a string of abusive and insulting WhatsApp about constituents and colleagues. Gwynne apologises for what he describes as the "badly misjudged" messages.
- 9 February –
  - Conservative shadow minister Alex Burghart tells the BBC's Sunday with Laura Kuenssberg there is "not a conversation to be had" about suggestions of an electoral pact with Reform UK.
  - Oliver Ryan, MP for Burnley, becomes the second MP to apologise for inappropriate comments made in a WhatsApp chat.
- 10 February –
  - Peter Mandelson begins his tenure as United Kingdom ambassador to the United States, and tells the BBC the UK must respect President Donald Trump's "strong and clear mandate for change".
  - Oliver Ryan is suspended from the Parliamentary Labour Party over his membership of a WhatsApp group in which offensive messages were exchanged.
  - King Charles III gives the prime minister and deputy prime minister a tour of his environmentally friendly, sustainable housing project at Nansledan in Cornwall.
  - MPs' basic salary is set to rise by 2.8% to £93,904 from April.
  - Darren Millar tells the Senedd he was in the "right place at the right time" as he defends his decision to attend the National Prayer Breakfast in the United States and miss a vote on the Welsh Government's budget. Millar also says he was promoting Welsh interests while in the US.
  - Simon Case, the former Cabinet Secretary, is appointed as the chair of the Team Barrow Delivery Board, a board that will oversee a £200m project to redevelop Barrow-in-Furness, Cumbria.
- 11 February –
  - Labour suspends 11 councillors in Greater Manchester as part of its investigation into a WhatsApp group in which offensive messages were exchanged.
  - James Garnor resigns as a member of Whittlebury Parish Council after a video was share that appeared to show an explosive device being triggered by a cat.
- 12 February – A review into the events leading up to the murder of David Amess finds that his killer, Ali Harbi Ali, was exited from the government's Prevent anti-terror programme "too quickly" and that its handling of him was "sub-optimal".
- 13 February –
  - A BBC News investigation discovers Chancellor Rachel Reeves was the subject of an expenses investigation while she was a senior manager at Halifax Bank of Scotland in the late 2000s. Her online CV is also reported to have exaggerated the length of time she was employed by the Bank of England. In response, Reeves says that no concerns were raised with her at the time of the investigation.
  - The Church of Scotland (Lord High Commissioner) Bill is introduced into the House of Commons in order to lift the ban on Roman Catholics becoming the King's representative at the Church of Scotland's annual assembly, after Lady Elish Angiolini KC, a practising Catholic, was appointed to be Lord High Commissioner of the 2025 general assembly.
  - Labour MP Kevin McKenna announces in the House of Commons that he is living with HIV.
  - The UK government publishes a list of 100 proposed locations for potential new towns in England, with Housing Minister Matthew Pennycook saying work on them will begin before the next general election.
- 14 February – The UK government scraps the role of independent adviser on political violence, created before the last general election.
- 16 February – Former prime minister Sir John Major warns that the US's isolationist policy could be a threat to world democracy as it could leave a power vacuum and embolden states such as Russia and China.
- 17 February – Social Democratic and Labour Party leader Claire Hanna announces that the party will decline any invitations to the White House for St Patrick's Day celebrations due to Donald Trump's stance on the Gaza conflict.
- 19 February – Business Secretary Jonathan Reynolds faces calls for his resignation after he was accused of falsely saying he was a solicitor in his online CV.
- 20 February –
  - Culture Secretary Lisa Nandy says she will raise concerns with BBC bosses over the documentary Gaza: How To Survive A War Zone, narrated by a 13-year-old boy who is the son of Hamas's deputy minister of agriculture. Hamas is a prescribed terrorist group in the UK, Israel and many other countries. The film is subsequently removed from BBC iPlayer.
  - Nigel Farage gives up ownership of Reform UK, the party he founded as a private limited company in 2018, and relinquishes his shares in the organisation.
  - Nathan Gill, the former leader of Reform UK in Wales, is charged with offences relating to bribery and is scheduled to appear in court on Monday 24 February.
- 21 February –
  - The Parliamentary Commissioner for Standards launches an investigation into former minister Andrew Gwynne over the alleged sending of offensive messages through a WhatsApp group.
  - Scottish Labour leader Anas Sarwar says he will deliver the "biggest reform of the NHS in decades" if his party wins the 2026 Scottish Parliament election.
  - Wales's Social Justice Secretary, Jane Hutt, who is the UK's longest serving minister after service in successive Welsh Governments since 1999, announces she will retire from the Senedd in 2026.
  - Sinn Féin confirms it will boycott St Patrick's Day events at the White House over US President Donald Trump's stance on the Israel-Gaza conflict.
- 24 February –
  - Suspended Labour MP Mike Amesbury is sentenced to ten weeks in prison after admitting to punching a man to the ground in his Cheshire constituency.
  - Westminster's Strangers' Bar is scheduled to reopen following a safety review. The establishment will have CCTV and extra security guards, while bar staff will be trained to look out for any potential safety issues.
  - The UK government rejects a call from Plaid Cymru to devolve responsibility for the Crown Estate in Wales to the Welsh Government, saying it would make no sense to do so.
  - Northern Ireland's Deputy First Minister, Emma Little-Pengelly confirms she will travel to Washington for St Patrick's Day celebrations at the White House.
- 25 February
  - Keir Starmer announces cuts to international aid to fund an increase of defence spending to 2.5% of GDP by 2027.
  - In her first major speech on foreign policy, Kemi Badenoch said the UK should leave the European Convention on Human Rights (ECHR).
  - Reform UK gains its first representative on Cornwall Council following the defection of Conservative councillor Kevin Towill.
  - Business Secretary Jonathan Reynolds apologises for saying he worked as a solicitor before he became an MP.
  - The first round of cross-party talks on social care reform in England is postponed.
- 27 February –
  - Starmer meets with US President Donald Trump at the White House for talks on Ukraine and defence.
  - King Charles III invites Trump to the UK for a second state visit.
  - Labour MP Mike Amesbury's prison sentence is suspended following an appeal.
- 28 February –
  - International Development Minister Anneliese Dodds resigns over the prime minister's cuts to the foreign aid budget, saying the UK's reputation will be deeply harmed.
  - Former Conservative Attorney General Dominic Grieve is appointed by the UK government to lead a review into creating a new definition of Islamophobia.
  - Owen Glass, a 10-year-old from the remote island of Tristan da Cunha, is reported to have become the youngest person to deliver a speech to the House of Commons.

=== March ===
- 1 March – Prime Minister Keir Starmer and Ukrainian president Volodymyr Zelenskyy meet for talks at 10 Downing Street following Zelensky's visit to Washington the previous day.
- 3 March – SNP MSP and deputy presiding officer Annabelle Ewing announces she will not seek re-election to Holyrood in 2026.
- 4 March –
  - The Home Office launches an advertising campaign in Iraq aimed at discouraging people from crossing the English Channel in small boats.
  - Former Scottish Labour leader Richard Leonard announces he will not seek re-election to the Scottish Parliament at the next election.
  - The Senedd votes 29–28 to approve the Welsh Government's £26bn budget for 2025–26 after Labour secured the support of Liberal Democrat Jane Dodds to achieve a majority.
- 5 March –
  - In his first major interview since leaving office, former Prime Minister Rishi Sunak expresses his regret at the use of the "Stop the boats" slogan, describing it as "too stark, too binary".
  - The UK government launches a consultation process on replacing the windfall tax on the profits of energy companies when it comes to an end in 2030.
  - SNP ministers Shona Robison and Fiona Hyslop announce they will stand down from Holyrood at the next Scottish election.
  - In an interview with the Daily Mail, Reform UK MP Rupert Lowe criticises the party's leadership under Nigel Farage, describing it as a "protest party led by the Messiah".
- 6 March –
  - UK officials say that around 20 countries, largely from Europe and the Commonwealth, are interested in joining a "coalition of the willing" to provide support to Ukraine.
  - Starmer attends a UK–Ireland summit in Liverpool alongside Taoiseach Micheál Martin at which he says the two countries have "turned a page on the turbulent years" and are ready for a meaningful partnership.
  - Conservative peer Lord Hamilton apologises after saying the Jewish community should "pay for their own" Holocaust memorial because they have "an awful lot of money" during a House of Lords debate on plans for a memorial near Parliament.
- 7 March –
  - Reform UK suspends MP Rupert Lowe from the party and refers him to police, alleging he has made "threats of physical violence" against party chairman Zia Yusuf.
  - Former Liverpool mayor Joe Anderson and city politician Derek Hatton are charged with bribery and misconduct relating to council contracts, along with 10 others.
  - Former Secretary of State for Wales Simon Hart says that Mark Drakeford, the country's First Minister during the COVID-19 pandemic, "dented people's confidence" in the UK government by saying successful aspects of the fight against COVID were Welsh Government policy and the unsuccessful were UK government policy.
- 8 March – Former national security adviser Mark Sedwill tells the BBC's The Week at Westminster the potential deployment of UK troops to Ukraine could last "many years".
- 10 March –
  - Mike Amesbury confirms he will stand down as the MP for Runcorn and Helsby following his conviction for assault, triggering a by-election.
  - Home Secretary Yvette Cooper rejects calls from the family of David Amess for a public inquiry into his murder.
  - Former Labour MP Thangam Debbonaire is introduced into the House of Lords.
  - Carol Beattie is appointed chief executive of the Scottish National Party after taking on the post in an acting role following the resignation of her predecessor, Murray Foote.
- 11 March –
  - The Metropolitan Police launch an investigation into Rupert Lowe over allegations of making "verbal threats".
  - The Democracy and Boundary Commission has decided that all Senedd seats will have Welsh language only names from 2026.
  - Reform UK gains its first representative on Falkirk Council following the defection of ex-Conservative turned Independent councillor Claire Mackie-Brown.
- 12 March –
  - Keir Starmer says the UK will "keep all options on the table" regarding Donald Trump's steel and aluminium tariffs.
  - All 404 Labour MPs are summoned to Downing Street for a briefing on the spring statement.
  - Former First Minister of Scotland, Nicola Sturgeon, announces she will stand down from the Scottish Parliament at the 2026 election.
  - Health Secretary Wes Streeting calls for his former assistant Sam Gould to resign from Redbridge London Borough Council after he admitted to indecent exposure.
  - The requirement for a High Court judge to approve applications is dropped by the bill committee of the Terminally Ill Adults (End of Life) Bill.
  - South Kesteven councillor Rosemary Trollope-Bellew leaves Reform UK just 11 days after joining.
- 13 March –
  - Keir Starmer announces that NHS England will be abolished in order to "cut bureaucracy".
  - First Minister of Scotland John Swinney holds talks with Eric Trump, the son of US President Donald Trump, at Bute House.
  - Chorley councillor Craige Southern is convicted of assault.
- 14 March –
  - Labour chooses Karen Shore, the deputy leader of Cheshire West and Chester Council to contest the 2025 Runcorn and Helsby by-election.
  - A hearing at the Old Bailey sets a trial date of 29 June 2026 for Nathan Gill, who is accused of accepting bribes to make statements in the European Parliament that would have been beneficial to Russia.
  - The High Court rules that former Home Secretary Suella Braverman acted unlawfully by housing three asylum seekers at MDP Wethersfield in Essex between July 2023 and February 2024, where they lived in "prison like" conditions.
- 17 March –
  - King Charles III meets newly appointed Canadian Prime Minister Mark Carney at Buckingham Palace.
  - Reform UK leader Nigel Farage welcomes a further 29 councillors, who have defected to the party in recent weeks.
  - The Refugee Council report that almost 42,000 asylum seekers are waiting for an appeal hearing after the Home Office.
- 18 March – A crackdown on government-funded credit cards is announced, with plans to reduce the 20,000 estimated to be in circulation by 50%.
- 19 March – King Charles III and Queen Camilla pay an official visit to Northern Ireland, which includes a private meeting with the First and Deputy First Ministers.
- 20 March –
  - Private WhatsApp messages are revealed in which Reform UK leader Nigel Farage accuses Rupert Lowe of "damaging the party just before elections" following a Daily Mail article in which he described Reform as being a "protest party" led by "the Messiah".
  - Former SNP chief executive Peter Murrell appears before Edinburgh Sheriff Court charged with embezzlement, while his estranged wife, former Nicola Sturgeon, is told she will face no further action in the police investigation into SNP finances.
  - Kemi Badenoch launches the Conservative local election campaign at an event in Buckinghamshire.
  - Jo Coburn announces her departure from the BBC and as host of the programme BBC Politics Live.
  - The 2025 City of London Corporation election is held in the City of London.
- 21 March –
  - SNP MSP Fergus Ewing announces he will not stand for the party at the 2026 Holyrood election, but may run as an independent.
  - Leaked messages deepen the row between Nigel Farage and Rupert Lowe.
  - Rachel Reeves pledges no "tax and spend" in her spring statement.
- 22 March – The UK government is reported to be considering establishing "return hubs" for failed asylum seekers in the Balkans.
- 23 March –
  - Chancellor Rachel Reeves confirms plans to reduce government running costs by 15% by the end of the decade.
  - Steve Witkoff, the US special envoy to the Middle East, dismisses Starmer's plan for an international peacekeeping force to support a ceasefire in Ukraine as "a posture and a pose".
- 25 March –
  - The UK government confirms it is ending a contract with Stay Belvedere Hotels to provide places for asylum seekers after an audit identified concerns about the firm's performance.
  - A report by Jacqueline Perry KC finds "credible evidence" Rupert Lowe and his staff mistreated two female team members in ways that "seem to amount to harassment".
  - Laurence Fox is charged with a sexual offence after allegedly sharing an intimate image of television star Narinder Kaur without her consent.
- 26 March – Chancellor Rachel Reeves will deliver the March 2025 United Kingdom spring statement to the House of Commons.
- 28 March –
  - Matthew Doyle announces he is stepping down as Downing Street Director of Communications.
  - Sinn Féin councillor Cathal King is suspended for two months from Newry, Mourne and Down District Council by the Northern Ireland Local Government Commission for Standards for being drunk in charge of a car.
- 28–29 March – 2025 Alba Party leadership election
- 29 March –
  - BBC News reports that Amanda Spielman, who was chief inspector of Ofsted at the time Ruth Perry committed suicide following a poor Ofsted assessment, has been nominated for a peerage by Conservative leader Kemi Badenoch.
  - Three Bolsover District Councillors resign from the Labour Party in protest at Keir Starmer's leadership, and will sit as independents.
- 30 March –
  - Downing Street sources tell the BBC the UK would not hesitate to retaliate against US tariffs if required.
  - Talks are held between the prime minister and US president, which are subsequently described as "constructive".

=== April ===
- 1 April –
  - Former Conservative government minister Sir Alister Jack, who admitted placing three bets on the outcome of the 2024 United Kingdom general election, is to be appointed to the House of Lords.
  - Stephen Flynn, the Scottish National Party's leader at Westminster, confirms his intention to stand for the party in the 2026 Holyrood election.
- 2 April – Patrick Harvie announces he is standing down as co-leader of the Scottish Greens, but will stay on until an election is held in the summer.
- 3 April – The Labour Party campaign for the local elections is launched in Derbyshire.
- 4 April –
  - Jamie Greene, an MSP who left the Scottish Conservatives the previous day, joins the Scottish Liberal Democrats, blaming his decision to leave the Conservative on them becoming "Trump-esque in both style and substance" in an attempt to win the support of right-wing voters. He subsequently says there is "growing disquiet" among former colleagues about the party's direction.
  - Stephen Hartley, a Reform UK candidate for the local elections to Oxfordshire County Council, is suspended from the party after it was revealed he had posted comments in support of child abuser Jimmy Savile on social media.
- 5 April – Labour suspends Dan Norris, the MP for North East Somerset and Hanham, following his arrest on suspicion of rape, child sex offences, child abduction and misconduct in a public office.
- 6 April –
  - Labour MPs Abtisam Mohamed and Yuan Yang say they are "astounded" to have been refused entry to Israel while on a trip to visit the West Bank. Israel say the refusal was because they intended to spread hate speech against Israel.
  - Elin Jones confirms she will stand down as Llywydd of the Senedd following the next election.
- 8 April –
  - Downing Street declines calls to officially back a campaign to buy British goods in the wake of the introduction of US trade tariffs, arguing that the UK is "an open-trading nation" and the government is "not going to tell people where they buy their stuff".
  - The European Court of Human Rights rules that businessman Sir Philip Green's human rights were not breached when he was named in the House of Lords in relation to misconduct allegations in 2018. He was named in Parliament under the rule of Parliamentary privilege, which allows Members of Parliament and peers to speak without the threat of legal repercussions.
- 9 April
  - King Charles gives a speech to the Italian Parliament. He and Queen Camilla also have a private meeting with Pope Francis at Vatican City.
  - Leader of the Fire Brigades Union Steve Wright calls on Labour MPs to reject benefit cuts.
  - Councillor for Talbot and Branksome Woods on Bournemouth, Christchurch and Poole Council Karen Rampton resigns from the Conservative Party.
  - The Welsh Government confirms that the Senedd will vote on whether the Terminally Ill Adults (End of Life) Bill should apply to Wales if it successfully passes through the Westminster parliament.
- 10 April –
  - The Cabinet Office is to lose a third of its posts as part of government reforms to the civil service, with 2,100 of the 6,500 positions to be cut.
  - Former Conservative Party minister Penny Mordaunt is to take up a role with British American Tobacco, as part of their Transformation Advisory Board.
  - Having previously ruled out an electoral pact with Reform at a national level, when asked by BBC News if the same applies at a local level in relation to the upcoming council elections, Conservative leader Kemi Badenoch says that local leaders of her party "would be free to share power" with other parties to keep councils running. Asked a similar question later, Nigel Farage, leader of Reform UK, appears to reject the idea although he does say that there could be "working relationships" with other parties.
- 11 April –
  - Publication of Rishi Sunak's Resignation Honours. They include peerages for Michael Gove, Alister Jack and Simon Hart, and knighthoods for Jeremy Hunt and James Cleverly.
  - Starmer travels to Northern Ireland to meet First Minister Michelle O'Neill and Deputy First Minister Emma Little-Pengelly to discuss US trade tariffs.
- 12 April –
  - Parliament is recalled to discuss emergency legislation to save the Scunthorpe Steelworks from closure. The legislation will see the UK government take control of the steelworks and preventing owners Jingye from closing it.
  - Liberal Democrat MP Wera Hobhouse speaks of her "shock" after being refused entry to Hong Kong a few days earlier.
  - Rail Minister Lord Peter Hendy refers himself to police after admitting he used a mobile phone while driving a vintage double-decker bus through London.
- 13 April – Bangladeshi authorities investigating corruption in relation to the regime of former prime minister Sheikh Hasina issue an arrest warrant for her niece, MP and former Labour minister Tulip Siddiq.
- 14 April –
  - Former MP Craig Williams is among 15 people to face charges in connection with the 2024 United Kingdom general election betting scandal, which have been brought by the Gambling Commission.
  - A report by a committee of MPs into policing during the 2024 riots concludes that the policing response during the riots was "entirely appropriate" given the circumstances, and that there was no evidence to suggest "two-tier policing".
  - The Scottish Government partially lifts a voluntary pay freeze after 16 years, meaning ministers will receive a £19,000 annual pay rise. Junior ministers will receive a salary of £100,575, while cabinet secretaries will receive £116,125.
  - Richard Choi is elected, becoming the first Hong Kong-born member of Sutton London Borough Council.
- 15 April –
  - UK government minister Lucy Powell has her Twitter account hacked to promote a "House of Commons" cryptocurrency scam.
  - Welsh Conservative Senedd member Russell George is removed from two Senedd committees after he is charged over the 2024 United Kingdom general election betting scandal.
- 18 April –
  - Keir Starmer and Donald Trump discussed trade in their first call since the imposition of tariffs on UK goods.
  - Russell Findlay, leader of the Scottish Conservatives, says he will not attend a forthcoming anti-far-right summit being chaired by First Minister of Scotland John Swinney, saying the event is "not required" and is being used to "deflect from the SNP's dismal record".
- 20 April – Yvette Cooper condemns the vandalism of statues in Parliament Square during a transgender rights protest.
- 22 April –
  - The Department for Business and Trade announces that the proposed redundancies at British Steel will not continue.
  - Kemi Badenoch calls for the ban of recording "non-crime hate incidents".
  - Deborah Taylor is announced as the chair of the public inquiry into the 2023 Nottingham attacks.
  - The Scottish Government says it has no plans to bring back the Gender Recognition Reform (Scotland) Bill following the Supreme Court ruling on what defines a woman.
  - Russell George withdraws as a Conservative candidate for the 2026 Senedd election after being charged over the general election betting scandal.
- 23 April – Kemi Badenoch rejects claims of a rift with Conservative frontbencher Robert Jenrick over whether the party should form a coalition with Reform UK after Sky News obtained footage of him speaking about wanting to "unite" the "fight" against Labour at the next general election.
- 24 April –
  - Campaign group Hope Not Hate says that Reform UK is fielding local election candidates who have "posted hate, pushed far-right conspiracies and praised extremists" despite statements by Nigel Farage about improving the party's vetting process.
  - The Senedd Commissioner for Standards finds that Senedd member Siân Gwenllian breached the Senedd's code of conduct after sharing a confidential letter, but recommends no further action is taken against her.
- 25 April – The electoral officer of North Kesteven District Council rules that Andrea Jenkyns is entitled to stand in the 2025 Lincolnshire mayoral election after questions were raised about her eligibility because she is not on the Lincolnshire electoral register, a prerequisite for standing.
- 28 April – Martin Dowey temporarily stands down as leader of South Ayrshire Council over a secret recording in which he appears to suggest he can help award contracts to "pals".
- 29 April – Scottish Greens MSP Maggie Chapman survives an attempt to remove her from the Scottish Parliament's equalities committee following her criticism of the judiciary over the Supreme Court's ruling on biological sex.
- 30 April – The Parliamentary Commissioner on Standards launches an investigation into Chancellor Rachel Reeves' failure to declare receiving theatre tickets within the required time that MPs must declare gifts.

=== May ===
- 1 May – 2025 United Kingdom local elections
- 2 May –
  - Reform UK wins 677 of around 1,600 seats contested in the English local elections, making gains mostly at the expense of the Conservatives. Reform also wins the Runcorn and Helsby by-election and the Lincolnshire mayoral election.
  - The Liberal Democrats gain an extra 160 seats, and control of Oxfordshire County Council, Shropshire County Council and Cambridgeshire County Council.
- 4 May – Conservative Party leader Kemi Badenoch tells the BBC it would be wrong to think a change of leader would "fix everything" following the party's heavy local election losses, and that the Conservatives will "come out fighting".
- 5 May –
  - Reform UK is forced to clarify that it will continue to fly county standards from council buildings in councils it controls following controversy after chairman Zia Yusuf said the only flags permitted to fly would be the Union Flag and St George's Flag.
  - Donna Edmunds, elected for Reform UK in Shropshire on 1 May, resigns from the party after she was suspended for tweeting that she intended to defect to another party.
- 6 May – The UK government says it has no plans to reverse cuts to winter fuel payments despite growing calls from within the Labour Party for it to do so.
- 8 May –
  - 42 Labour MPs sign a letter calling for changes to proposed cuts to disability benefits.
  - John Swinney says he will not support assisted suicide in Scotland.
  - Carla Denyer says she will not be a candidate in the 2025 Green Party of England and Wales leadership election.
  - Reform UK councillor Sean Matthews is selected to be the new leader of Lincolnshire County Council.
  - Luke Shingler, Reform UK councillor for Nuneaton's Galley Common on Warwickshire County Council, leaves the party to sit as an independent.
- 12 May – Adrian Ramsay and Ellie Chowns launch a joint campaign to become co-leaders of the Green Party of England and Wales in the upcoming leadership election.
- 13 May –
  - Labour MP Tahir Ali is being investigated by the Independent Parliamentary Standards Authority over excessive expenses.
  - Conservative MP Patrick Spencer is charged with two sexual assaults that allegedly took place at London's Groucho Club.
  - MSPs vote 70–56 in an initial vote to accept the principles of the Assisted Dying for Terminally Ill Adults (Scotland) Bill, which would allow assisted dying in Scotland.
  - Reform UK leader Nigel Farage says he will not stand in the 2026 Senedd election and has no plans to lead the party in Wales.
- 14 May – The Crown Prosecution Service announces that ex-Reform MP Rupert Lowe will not face charges over alleged threats to party chairman Zia Yusuf.
- 15 May – Lowe, who was suspended from the Reform UK party in March, accuses Farage of running the party like a cult.
- 16 May – Welsh Conservatives leader Darren Millar tells his party's annual conference that the Conservatives may need to work with Plaid Cymru or Reform UK to form a government following the next Senedd election.
- 17 May – Darren Millar describes Reform UK as a "one-man personality cult" with no serious solution for Wales.
- 18 May –
  - Former Conservative cabinet minister Michael Gove tells BBC Scotland's The Sunday Show that he does not believe a second Scottish independence referendum is necessary, but that it could happen if there was "overwhelming support" for one.
  - David Clews, a conspiracy theorist and far-right influencer, and Mark Collett, a Nazi-sympathiser who set up the far-right Patriotic Alternative, have called for supporters to "infiltrate" Reform UK following its recent success to push their own "pro-white" and anti-immigration agenda.
- 20 May – Starmer apologises to Liz Saville-Roberts, Plaid Cymru's leader at Westminster, after saying at the previous week's Prime Minister's Questions that "she talks rubbish".
- 21 May –
  - Conservative Garry Perry resigns as leader of Walsall Council with immediate effect after what he describes as a "campaign of political attrition, deliberate undermining, and personal hostility".
  - Tameside Council appoints Brenda Warrington, whose involvement in a controversial WhatsApp group led to the suspension of several Labour councillors and MPs, as its standards watchdog.
- 22 May –
  - Reform UK are accused of "blatant" racism by Scottish Labour over an online advert which says that Anas Sarwar will "prioritise the Pakistani community".
  - Welsh Labour expels Cardiff councillor Keith Jones after an investigation found he had sexually harassed a teenager.
- 23 May – Conservative leader Kemi Badenoch says she cannot commit to fully restoring winter fuel payments to pensioners.
- 25 May –
  - Deputy Prime Minister Angela Rayner refuses to confirm whether the government will remove the two-child benefit cap in the 2025 budget.
  - Nigel Farage says that Reform UK would scrap the two-child benefit cap, and restore winter fuel payments to pensioners, if elected.
  - Labour's renationalisation of the UK's railways begins as the train operator South Western Railway is taken into public ownership.
- 26 May – King Charles III and Queen Camilla begin a two day visit to Canada, where the King will deliver a Speech from the throne in the Canadian Parliament, the first such speech in the country for 50 years.
- 27 May –
  - Charles III addresses the opening session of the 45th Canadian Parliament, and receives a standing ovation from Canadian MPs following a speech in support of Canada staying "strong and free".
  - Nigel Farage says that a future Reform UK government would introduce generous tax breaks for married couples to make it easier for them to have children, and scrap the two-child benefit cap.
- 29 May –
  - The UK government reveals its plans for overhauling pension investment funds to create models similar to those in Australia and Canada; the plans include the creation of £25bn "megafunds" which will be instructed to make a portion of their investments locally to help fuel economic growth.
  - In a speech attacking Reform policy, Starmer accuses Farage of "fantasy economics" and says his unfunded tax cuts would "crash the economy" like Liz Truss.
  - Former Scottish Conservative leader Douglas Ross is ejected from the Scottish Parliament during First Minister's Questions after talking over John Swinney's answer. Ross later questions the neutrality of the decision to eject him.
- 30 May –
  - Attorney General Lord Hermer says that he regrets comments made during a speech the previous day in which he suggested calls for the UK to depart from international law were similar to arguments being made in 1930s Germany, and describes the comments as "clumsy".
  - Nigel Farage announces that Reform UK will begin accepting donations in Bitcoin, becoming the first UK party to do so.
  - The Black Country Party is launched by six councillors on Dudley Metropolitan Borough Council, who join the party.

=== June ===
- 2 June – Reform UK announces plans to cut "wasteful spending" in councils it controls with the establishment of what it describes as a Department of Government Efficiency (Doge), with Kent County Council the first area to have a Doge department.
- 4 June – In her first question to the prime minister during Prime Minister's Questions, Sarah Pochin, the newly elected Reform UK MP for Runcorn and Helsby, calls on Keir Starmer to introduce a ban of the wearing of burqas "in the interests of public safety". Her request is rejected by the prime minister, and described as "dumb" by Reform's chairman, Zia Yusuf.
- 5 June –
  - Shadow Chancellor Mel Stride seeks to distance the Conservative Party from the September 2022 mini-budget of Liz Truss by saying the Conservatives will "never again" put the UK's economic stability at risk by making "promises we cannot afford".
  - Conservative leader Kemi Badenoch announces plans to establish a commission to look at whether the UK should withdraw from some international agreements, such as the European Convention on Human Rights, which she says are binding hands of the UK government.
  - Zia Yusuf resigns as chairman of Reform UK, saying working to get the party elected is no longer "a good use of [his] time". Technology entrepreneur Nathaniel Fried, seen as a key figure in the party's DOGE strategy, resigns along with Yusuf.
  - The Hamilton, Larkhall and Stonehouse by-election takes place following the death of Christina McKelvie, and is won by Davy Russel for Scottish Labour, who take the seat from the Scottish National Party.
- 6 June –
  - BBC News reports that opposition to the Terminally Ill Adults (End of Life) Bill is growing among MPs, with a number who voted for it or abstained now saying they will vote against it.
  - Following criticism of her performance at Prime Minister's Questions, Kemi Badenoch says she is "going to get better" as her party's leader, and is not "shy about self-criticism".
  - Nathaniel Fried tells Politics South East that he resigned as head of Reform UK's Doge effort because the departure of Zia Yusuf left him with "a bit of doubt" about the project's future.
  - Alexander Walker, the youngest member of Rhyl Town Council, is elected as the town's mayor at the age of 25.
- 7 June – Zia Yusuf announces he will return to Reform UK two days after resigning, and will run its Doge team.
- 8 June –
  - The UK government says it intends to spend £86bn on the science and technology sector by the end of the current parliament.
  - Reform's deputy leader, Richard Tice, insists the party knows "exactly what it is doing" following Zia Yusuf's departure and return.
  - Speaking on BBC Scotland's Sunday Show, Scottish Labour leader Anas Sarwar accuses the Scottish National Party of running a "dishonest and disgraceful" campaign ahead of the Hamilton, Larkhall and Stonehouse by-election by attempting to push voters towards Reform UK, whose candidate came third in the election.
- 9 June – In a major political U-turn, the chancellor, Rachel Reeves confirms that three quarters of old age pensioners – roughly nine million – will receive winter fuel payments during the coming winter, with pensioners on an annual income of £35,000 or less eligible to receive the benefit.
- 10 June – Television presenter David Bull is named as Chairman of Reform UK, replacing Zia Yusuf.
- 12 June – The Data (Use and Access) Bill passes its final reading in the House of Lords and will now become law once it received Royal assent.
- 13 June –
  - Terminally Ill Adults (End of Life) Bill: MPs vote to prevent health professionals from initiating a conversation about assisted dying with anyone under the age of 18.
  - Colin Crawford announces he is stepping down as the Ulster Unionist MLA for North Antrim.
- 17 June – Orkney Islands Council ends its two-year investigation into achieving greater autonomy after a report concluded it would be too difficult and expensive, and instead agrees to look at a single authority model.
- 19 June – Vicky Foxcroft resigns as a government whip over the UK government's plans to cut disability benefits.
- 20 June –
  - The UK government announces an overhaul of local spending that will see the most deprived areas receiving the most money.
  - The Scottish Government announces that WhatsApp and other non-corporate messaging services will be removed from its official phones.
  - Kay Mason Billig, the leader of Norfolk County Council, apologises "unreservedly" for posting a picture of a steak dinner on Facebook with the words: "Wonder what all the poor people are doing?"
- 21 June – An Ipsos poll gives Reform UK its highest poll rating so far, with 34%, nine points ahead of Labour on 25%, and 19 points ahead of the Conservatives on 15%.
- 22 June – Former Pembrokeshire councillor Andrew Edwards is disqualified from holding public office for four years over a racist voice note he posted on WhatsApp.
- 23 June – Reform UK announces that it would give people with non-domicile tax status the chance to avoid some UK taxes by paying a £250,000 fee, with the proceeds going to people on the lowest incomes.
- 25 June –
  - Buckingham Palace confirms that US President Donald Trump will make a full state visit to the UK later in the year.
  - Starmer says the government will press ahead with a parliamentary vote on welfare reform on 1 July, despite a growing rebellion among backbench Labour MPs that could see the proposed legislation defeated.
  - Reform councillor Rob Howard resigns as leader of Warwickshire County Council citing his health, and leaving his 18-year-old deputy, George Finch, as interim leader.
- 29 June – Conservative MP George Freeman refers himself to the Parliamentary Commissioner for Standards after allegations a company he works for asked him to ask a question in Parliament.
- 30 June – Two Reform UK breakaway parties are formed by past Reform members. Advance UK is established by Ben Habib, and Restore Britain is started by Rupert Lowe.

=== July ===
- 1 July – Reform UK accuses the chief executive of Warwickshire County Council of staging a "coup d'état" after she refused to remove a Progress Pride flag from the county's Shire Hall before the end of Pride Month.
- 2 July – A report by the Senedd Standards Commission finds that First Minister of Wales Eluned Morgan failed to declare a donation from the Unite union.
- 3 July – Zarah Sultana, suspended from the Parliamentary Labour Party in 2024, announces she is leaving Labour to establish a political party with former Labour leader Jeremy Corbyn.
- 4 July – Linden Kemkaran, Reform UK's leader of Kent County Council, attracts criticism over a social media post in which he said transgender-related books would be removed from the county's libraries with immediate effect, and described the decision as a "victory for common sense in Kent".
- 5 July –
  - Foreign Secretary David Lammy becomes the first UK minister to visit Syria since the outbreak of the Syrian Civil War in 2011, and meets interim president Ahmed al-Sharaa. The UK government also announces £94.5m of financial support to help the country's recovery.
  - James McMurdock, elected as the Reform UK MP for South Basildon and East Thurrock at the last election, relinquishes the party whip after The Sunday Times raised questions about business loans he took out during the COVID-19 pandemic.
- 6 July – BBC News reports that Reform UK would be highly unlikely to introduce an insurance based healthcare system in Wales should it win the 2026 Senedd election, largely because of the timescale and potential legal implications of doing so.
- 7 July –
  - David Jones, a former Conservative Secretary of State for Wales who stepped down from Parliament at the 2024 election, announces he is defecting to Reform UK.
  - Amazon removes a number of AI-generated unofficial biographies of Scotland's first ministers from sale after BBC News alerts them to a significant number of inaccuracies contained within the books.
- 8 July –
  - French President Emmanuel Macron begins a three-day state visit to the UK, becoming the first French President to visit the UK since 2008, and the first European leader to do so since Brexit.
  - Former prime minister Rishi Sunak joins Goldman Sachs as a senior advisor.
  - James McMurdock says he will not return to Reform UK after asking to have the party whip withdrawn.
  - Sir Robert Chote resigns as chairman of the UK Statistics Authority, the body that oversees the Office for National Statistics.
  - MPs vote 415–98 to approve the Football Governance Bill that will establish a regulatory body for the top five tiers of English football.
- 9 July –
  - Secretary of State for Wales Jo Stevens says public services in Wales will not face cuts despite a shortfall in covering a rise in employers' National Insurance contributions. Her comments follow a warning from Welsh Government Finance Secretary Mark Drakeford, who warned Wales was facing a £36m financial black hole.
  - MPs approve the amended Universal Credit Bill.
  - Former Conservative Party Chair and MP Sir Jake Berry announces he is defecting to Reform UK.
  - Reform UK councillor Mandy Clare is suspended from her job in the office of Sarah Pochin pending a court date.
  - DUP councillor Linda Clarke is suspended from Antrim and Newtownabbey Borough Council.
- 10 July –
  - Kemi Badenoch says Conservative politicians who want to join Reform UK are "welcome to do so".
  - Liberal Democrat Spokesperson for Women and Equalities Christine Jardine is removed from the frontbench after she rebelled on a welfare vote.
  - Bert Bingham, Reform UK's cabinet member for transport and environment at Nottinghamshire County Council, faces criticism after saying that man-made climate change is a "hoax" during a public meeting.
- 11 July –
  - Unite the Union votes to suspend Angela Rayner's membership following a long running dispute over her role in the Birmingham bin strike.
  - The Parliamentary Commissioner for Standards launches an investigation into Rupert Lowe over allegations he failed to register money raised in donations to fund his independent "Rape Gang Inquiry". He is subsequently cleared later the same day following a brief investigation.
  - 18-year-old George Finch is installed as permanent leader of the Reform group at Warwickshire County Council.
- 14 July – It is confirmed that Keir Starmer and John Swinney will meet US President Donald Trump when he travels to Scotland later in July for the opening of his golf course at Menie, Aberdeenshire.
- 16 July – Starmer suspends Neil Duncan-Jordan, Brian Leishman, Chris Hinchliff and Rachael Maskell from the Parliamentary Labour Party for repeated breaches of party discipline.
- 17 July –
  - Prime Minister Keir Starmer and German Chancellor Friedrich Merz sign the Kensington Treaty during Merz's first official visit to the UK. The treaty includes plans for a direct train link between London and Berlin.
  - Publication of the Elections Bill, which includes provisions for lowering the age of voting to 16 for the next general election.
  - Diane Abbott is suspended from the Labour Party pending an investigation into comments she is alleged to have made about racism.
- 18 July – Sir Wayne David announces he is standing down as chief special adviser to Eluned Morgan for health reasons.
- 20 July – Nigel Farage accuses council officials of obstructing the work of Reform UK councillors as he defends the way the party is running some local authorities.
- 21 July –
  - Nigel Farage proposes creating 30,000 prison places by sending some UK prisoners overseas to serve their sentences, repatriating foreign prisoners accommodated in UK prisons and building five new prisons. He also proposes recruiting a further 30,000 police officers.
  - Outgoing Scottish Greens co-leader Patrick Harvie is selected as the party's top candidate for the Scottish Parliament's Glasgow regional constituency, giving him a strong change of re-election at the 2026 Scottish Parliament election.
- 22 July –
  - Kemi Badenoch conducts a shadow cabinet reshuffle, her first as Leader of the Opposition. Among her appointments are James Cleverly, who becomes Shadow Housing Secretary.
  - Welsh Conservative member of the Senedd Laura Anne Jones joins Reform UK.
  - 19-year-old George Finch is formally appointed as leader of Warwickshire County Council, making the Reform UK councillor the UK's youngest permanent council leader.
- 23 July – The Scottish Greens are forced to issue a new list of candidates for the next Holyrood election after an error was found in counting the votes.
- 24 July – Jeremy Corbyn and Zarah Sultana officially launch their new political party, which has the provisional name Your Party.
- 25 July –
  - 220 MPs sign a letter to the prime minister urging him to recognise Palestinian statehood.
  - Former SNP MP Mhairi Black announces that she has left the party, citing its stance over transgender rights and Palestine as her main reasons for doing so.
  - US President Donald Trump arrives at Prestwick Airport to begin a four-day private visit to the United Kingdom during which he will meet Prime Minister Keir Starmer and First Minister of Scotland John Swinney.
- 29 July –
  - Starmer announces the UK will recognise a Palestinian state in September unless Israel takes "substantive steps to end the appalling situation in Gaza". Benjamin Netanyahu, Israel's prime minister, says in response that to do so "rewards Hamas's monstrous terrorism". Ghazi Hamad of Hamas welcomes the announcement as "one of the fruits of October 7".
  - Trump completes his four-day visit to Scotland and returns to the United States.
- 30 July –
  - The Parliamentary Commissioner for Standards launches an investigation into Nigel Farage over a potential breach of parliamentary rules over financial interests.
  - Former Downing Street Chief of Staff Sue Gray is appointed to the board of governors of Queen's University Belfast.
  - Adam Holloway, the former Conservative MP for Gravesham, defects to Reform UK.
- 31 July – James Orr, chairman of the pro-Reform UK think tank, the Centre for a Better Britain, tells the Today programme an incoming Reform government would have to do some "very unpopular" things in its first 100 days in office and force "nasty cough medicine down the country's throat" but that if "Reform ends up governing the country, we should all want them to succeed".

=== August ===
- 1 August –
  - The UK government plans to restrict civil service internships to graduates from "lower socio-economic backgrounds", judged by what jobs their parents did when they were 14, in an attempt to make the civil service more working class.
  - The Ministry of Defence announces that Permanent Secretary David Williams will be replaced as the Ministry's chief civil servant following the Afghan data breach.
  - Bangladesh's Anti Corruption Commission confirms that Labour MP Tulip Siddiq will face trial later in August over corruption allegations.
  - Voting begins in the Green Party leadership and deputy leadership elections.
- 2 August –
  - Cat Eccles, the MP for Stourbridge, is being investigated by the Parliamentary Commissioner on Standards over claims she was late declaring a trip to Israel and Palestine. Overseas trips must be declared within 25 days.
  - An Edinburgh Festival Fringe event involving Scotland's first minister, John Swinney, is disrupted by pro-Palestine protesters.
- 3 August – The UK government plans to amend the Border Security, Asylum and Immigration Bill to create a criminal offence of online advertising Channel crossings for migrants.
- 4 August – Deputy First Minister of Scotland Kate Forbes announces she will not be a candidate in the 2026 Scottish Parliament election.
- 5 August – Warwickshire Police rejects a claim made by George Finch, Warwickshire County Council's Reform UK leader, that it held back information over the alleged rape of a 12-year-old girl in Nuneaton.
- 7 August –
  - Deputy Prime Minister Angela Rayner gives China two weeks to explain why parts of its plans for a new embassy in London are blanked out.
  - Rushanara Ali resigns as homelessness minister following criticism about the way she handled a rent increase on a property she owns.
- 8 August –
  - Starmer describes Israel's plans to take full military control of Gaza City as "wrong" and says they "will only bring more bloodshed".
  - Foreign Secretary David Lammy meets US Vice President JD Vance for talks at his official residence, Chevening House, where they discuss the UK's plans to recognise a Palestinian state.
- 9 August – Lammy and Vance host a meeting of security officials near London to discuss the war in Ukraine.
- 12 August – Chancellor Rachel Reeves travels to Stormont to meet ministers, who urge her to use the next budget to invest in public services.
- 15 August –
  - Afzal Khan resigns as the UK's trade envoy to Turkey following criticism over a trip to the self-declared Turkish Republic of Northern Cyprus, which is not recognised as a state by the UK government.
  - Reform UK leader Nigel Farage writes to the prime minister requesting that he allow him to appoint Reform UK members to the House of Lords.
- 18 August – Reform UK councillor Joseph Boam is removed as the deputy leader of Leicestershire County Council, where the party runs a minority administration, after three months in the post. He is also removed from his role in cabinet, with no explanation given for either decisions.
- 19 August – Kate Osborne, the MP for Jarrow and Gateshead East, is being investigated by the Independent Parliamentary Standards Authority for her spending on travel and subsistence costs, as well as "miscellaneous costs and financial assistance" following an operation.
- 20 August –
  - James Harding, the BBC's former director of news, says the broadcaster should be protected from "political interference" following comments by Culture Secretary Lisa Nandy earlier in the year, when she appeared to call for the resignation of director-general Tim Davie.
  - Former Conservative MP Sarah Atherton leaves the party, describing it as "impotent" and something that "no longer aligns" with her "values or ideology", and announces plans to stand in the 2026 Senedd election.
- 22 August –
  - MSP Jeremy Balfour resigns from the Scottish Conservatives, saying the party has "fallen into the trap of reactionary politics" under the leadership of Russell Findlay.
  - Dame Andrea Jenkyns, Zia Yusuf, Gawain Towler, Darren Grimes, Dan Barker and Paul Nuttall join Reform UK's governing board.
- 23 August – Nigel Farage tells The Times that a Reform government would introduce an Illegal Migration (Mass Deportation) Bill that would cost the UK £10bn to implement.
- 25 August – Richard Tice, Reform UK's energy spokesman, says the party would look at the potential of fracking if in government.
- 26 August –
  - Safeguarding Minister Jess Phillips tells BBC News that the screening tool used to decide which domestic abuse victims get urgent support "doesn't work".
  - Nigel Farage announces that Reform UK would preclude anyone arriving into the UK by illegal means from claiming asylum, with plans to deport 600,000 people over five years.
  - Farage says that in order to deport 600,000 asylum seekers, a government headed by his party would leave the European Convention on Human Rights (ECHR) which may require a renegotiation of the terms of the Good Friday Agreement which has the ECHR written into it.
- 27 August –
  - Former British Prime Minister Tony Blair joins a White House meeting with US President Donald Trump to discuss post-war Gaza.
  - Liberal Democrat leader Sir Ed Davey announces he will boycott the banquet for Donald Trump's state visit to the United Kingdom in order to "send a message" over the humanitarian crisis in Gaza.
  - Scottish Conservative MSP Graham Simpson defects to Reform UK.
  - Farage rules out deporting children as part of Reform's deportation policy.
- 28 August –
  - Starmer is to replace his principal private secretary, Nin Pandit, after ten months in the role. She follows the departures of chief of staff, Sue Gray, in October 2024 and director of communications, Matthew Doyle, in March, as the third Starmer-appointed senior staff member to be let go by him in less than a year.
  - The UK, France and Germany begin the process of restoring UN sanctions against Iran following tension over its nuclear programme.
  - MSP Colin Smyth has his Holyrood pass deactivated following allegations he placed a camera in a Scottish Parliament toilet.
  - Reform UK's Mick Barton, the leader of Nottinghamshire County Council, has banned journalists from the Nottingham Post and its online version, Nottingham Live, from speaking to him or any of his councillors following a dispute over a story the newspaper printed about reorganising local government. A few days later Barton says that his councillors are not banned from speaking to journalists from the newspaper.
- 29 August –
  - The UK government says that an Israeli delegation will not be invited to a global defence exhibition in London in September because of the Gaza war.
  - 2025 Scottish Greens co-leadership election: Ross Greer and Gillian Mackay are elected as co-leaders of the Scottish Greens.
- 31 August –
  - Conservative Party leader Kemi Badenoch says her party would remove all net zero requirements on oil and gas companies drilling in the North Sea if they win the next general election.
  - Derek Thomson is suspended as Secretary-General of the Scottish branch of Unite the union pending an internal investigation.

=== September ===
- 1 September – Prime Minister Keir Starmer performs a cabinet reshuffle.
- 2 September – Zack Polanski is elected leader of the Green Party of England and Wales. Mothin Ali and Rachel Millward are elected as joint deputy leaders.
- 3 September –
  - Deputy Prime Minister Angela Rayner admits to underpaying stamp duty on an £800,000 flat in Hove.
  - First Minister of Scotland John Swinney announces a pause of public money from the Scottish Government to arms companies supplying weapons to Israel.
  - Addressing a US congressional committee, Nigel Farage urges US politicians and businesses to oppose what he feels is the UK government's stance on freedom of speech.
- 4 September –
  - The Scottish Government publishes a new paper setting out the case for Scottish independence. First Minister John Swinney urges the UK government to hold a second Scottish independence referendum if the SNP wins a majority at the 2026 Scottish Parliament election.
  - Former Conservative Party minister Nadine Dorries defects to Reform UK.
  - Warwickshire County Council's Reform cabinet votes to strip the chief executive of responsibility for deciding what flags can be flown outside its building, handing it to the council chairman.
- 5 September –
  - Angela Rayner resigns as both Deputy Prime Minister and Deputy Leader of the Labour Party after admitting underpaying stamp duty on her £800,000 home in Hove, East Sussex.
  - Starmer carries out another cabinet reshuffle in the wake of Rayner's resignation, appointing David Lammy as Deputy Prime Minister, Yvette Cooper as Foreign Secretary, and Shabana Mahmood as Home Secretary. Douglas Alexander is appointed Secretary of State for Scotland, replacing Ian Murray.
  - Nigel Farage makes his keynote speech to the Reform UK annual conference, telling delegates they must prepare for an early election following Rayner's resignation.
  - Members of the public are temporarily banned from the chamber of the House of Commons after a mobile phone was found hidden there during a security search.
- 8 September –
  - The UK government outlines a new defence industrial strategy with £250m of investment in five local economies with a view to creating jobs and fuel growth.
  - Kevin Stewart, a former Scottish Government minister and the MSP for Aberdeen Central, announces he will stand down from Holyrood at the 2026 election on health grounds.
- 9 September –
  - A message from Peter Mandelson, the UK's ambassador to the United States, is included in a "birthday book" of messages to convicted paedophile Jeffrey Epstein released by the US Congress.
  - Bridget Phillipson, Lucy Powell and Bell Ribeiro-Addy are the three Labour MPs with the most nominations for the Labour Party deputy leadership contest; they must reach 80 nominations to enter the contest.
  - First Minister of Scotland John Swinney meets US President Donald Trump at the White House, where they have what are described as "constructive discussions" about tariffs on the import of scotch whisky to the United States.
  - Reform UK's deputy leader, Richard Tice, says a Reform government would scrap the Northern Powerhouse Rail project.
  - Alliance Party MLA Nuala McAllister is ejected from the chamber of the Northern Ireland Assembly following a clash with deputy speaker Steve Aiken during which she described him as "patronising".
- 10 September –
  - Prime Minister Keir Starmer meets Israeli President Isaac Herzog at 10 Downing Street for talks.
  - Alison McGovern drops out of the Labour Party deputy leadership contest and gives her support to Bridget Phillipson.
  - An investigation by the Senedd's Standards Commissioner concludes that Reform UK's Laura Anne Jones broke the rules by using a racial slur to describe Chinese people, but clears her of making fraudulent expenses claims.
- 11 September –
  - Peter Mandelson is sacked from the post of UK Ambassador to the United States following revelations about his relationship with Jeffrey Epstein.
  - The constituency office of Labour MP for Washington and Gateshead South Sharon Hodgson is destroyed in an arson attack. A man was arrested.
  - Lucy Powell and Bridget Phillipson both receive enough nominations to contest the Labour Party deputy leadership election, while Bell Riberio-Addy pulls out of the contest after failing to secure enough support. Earlier in the day, Emily Thornberry and Paula Barker withdrew from the race.
  - Sean Morgan, the leader of Caerphilly County Borough Council, resigns from Welsh Labour and joins Plaid Cymru, meaning he also relinquishes his post as council leader.
  - The Liberal Democrats win the Talbot and Branksome Woods by-election for Bournemouth, Christchurch and Poole Council.
  - Reform UK win their first seat on Vale of Glamorgan Council at a by-election in Illtyd in Barry.
- 12 September –
  - The new Foreign Secretary Yvette Cooper visits Ukraine.
  - The House of Lords begins its scrutiny of the Terminally Ill Adults (End of Life) Bill.
  - Nigel Farage says he has no "financial stake" in a house bought by his partner in his Clacton constituency.
  - In a since deleted social media post, Blackpool councillor Jim O'Neill, who defected from the Conservatives to Reform UK, says that Reform have let too many Conservative "rejects" in.
  - Manchester Metropolitan University strips Peter Mandelson of the honorary doctorate given to him upon his appointment as Chancellor in 2016, and the commemorative medal given to him at the end of his tenure in 2024.
- 15 September –
  - Paul Ovenden resigns as a senior aide to the prime minister after sexually explicit and offensive text messages sent by him in 2017 and concerning MP Diane Abbott came to light.
  - Former Shadow Minister for Work and Pensions Danny Kruger leaves the Conservative Party to join Reform UK.
- 16 September –
  - US President Donald Trump arrives in the UK for his second state visit.
  - Labour MPs Simon Opher and Peter Prinsley, who were part of a parliamentary delegation visiting the West Bank to see humanitarian and medical work, say they have been refused entry into Israel.
  - Conservative Party leader Kemi Badenoch begins presenting a monthly phone-in on LBC.
  - A police investigation into claims former Conservative MP Mark Menzies misused donors' money to pay "bad people" is dropped after he agreed to repay the money.
  - Former Conservative minister Maria Caulfield, who lost her seat at the last election, joins Reform UK.
  - Mark McEwan steps down as Standards Commissioner at Stormont a week after his appointment to take up the post of Deputy Chief Constable of Surrey Police.
- 17 September – Mason Humberstone, a member of Stevenage Borough Council, becomes the first Labour Party councillor to defect to Reform UK.
- 18 September – The Newham Independents win a local by-election in Plaistow South.
- 19 September –
  - The Terminally Ill Adults (End of Life) Bill passes its second reading in the House of Lords.
  - Jamie Hepburn resigns as the Scottish Government's Minister for Cabinet and Parliamentary Business following a complaint that he assaulted former Conservative leader Douglas Ross as the two were leaving the Scottish Parliament building two days earlier.
  - Wales's Health Minister, Jeremy Miles, announces he will not stand in the 2026 Senedd election.
  - John Allen, a councillor on Northumberland County Council, is suspended from Reform UK following allegations he made online threats to kill the prime minister.
  - A schism breaks out between Zarah Sultana and Jeremy Corbyn over Your Party.
  - Andy Burnham says he "isn't ruling out" a return to Westminster politics.
- 20 September –
  - The Liberal Democrat conference starts in Bournemouth.
  - Gavin Robinson launches the Democratic Unionist Party conference in Belfast.
  - Sinn Féin endorse Catherine Connolly in the 2025 Irish presidential election.
- 21 September –
  - The UK announces its formal recognition of Palestine as a sovereign state.
  - Former MP Callum McCaig is appointed chief executive of the Scottish National Party.
- 22 September –
  - Chancellor Rachel Reeves accuses "hostile states like Russia" of being behind a series of recent cyberattacks in the UK.
  - Reform UK announces it will abolish the right of migrants to qualify for permanent settlement in the UK after five years if it wins the next election.
  - SNP councillor Grant Laing, resigns as leader of Perth and Kinross Council after he is charged with embezzlement.
- 23 September –
  - Ed Davey gives his keynote speech to the 2025 Liberal Democrats Party Conference.
  - Former Scottish Government minister Jamie Hepburn apologises to Holyrood for his conduct.
- 24 September –
  - Bridget Phillipson says she has been the victim of sexist briefings amid the 2025 Labour Party deputy leadership election.
  - Jeremy Corbyn apologises for the confusion surrounding the launch of Your Party.
- 25 September –
  - Andy Burnham is rebuked by some Labour MPs around his potential leadership bid.
  - Steph Driver resigns as Downing Street Director of Communications.
  - Ministers consider supporting Jaguar Land Rover suppliers whilst car production is suspended due to a cyber-attack.
- 26 September – John McDonnell and Apsana Begum are readmitted to the Labour Party following their suspension in 2024 over a vote against the government on the two-child benefit cap.
- 27 September –
  - The 2025 Labour Party Conference begins in Liverpool.
  - Buckingham Palace announces that King Charles III and Queen Camilla will meet Pope Leo XIV in Vatican City as part of a state visit to Italy in October.
  - MSP Foysol Choudhury is suspended from Scottish Labour over an allegation of inappropriate conduct.
- 29 September – Chancellor Rachel Reeves makes her keynote speech to the Labour Party Conference.
- 30 September –
  - Starmer makes his keynote speech to the 2025 Labour Party Conference.
  - Ed Davey reshuffles his Liberal Democrat frontbench.

=== October ===
- 1 October – PPE Medpro is ordered to pay back £122m to the government after supplying non-compliant medical gowns during the COVID-19 pandemic.
- 2 October –
  - Former Conservative MP Sarah Atherton joins Reform UK and says she wants to stand in the 2026 Senedd election.
  - Reform UK-led Nottinghamshire County Council partially lift the ban they imposed on the Nottingham Post in response to a request to lift it in full from a law firm representing the publishers.
  - Kemi Badenoch pledges to repeal the Climate Change Act 2008.
- 3 October –
  - Dame Sarah Mullally is named as the first female Archbishop of Canterbury, replacing Justin Welby following his resignation.
  - Zack Polanski makes his keynote speech as leader of the Green Party of England and Wales at their annual conference.
  - Shabana Mahmood calls Pro-Palestinian protests "un-British" following the 2025 Manchester synagogue attack.
  - Michelle Mone, Baroness Mone says she has no wishes to return to the House of Lords.
- 4 October –
  - The 2025 Conservative Party Conference begins in Manchester.
  - London Assembly member Keith Prince defects from the Conservative Party to Reform UK.
- 5 October – The Conservatives say they would task officials with deporting 750,000 migrants over five years if they form the next government.
- 7 October –
  - The Guardian publishes video footage of Robert Jenrick, the Shadow Justice Secretary, describing the Handsworth area of Birmingham as "one of the worst-integrated places" in the UK during an after dinner speech recorded in March.
  - 20 Conservative councillors defect to Reform UK.
- 8 October – Conservative Party leader Kemi Badenoch delivers her keynote speech to the Conservative Party Conference on its final day.
- 9 October –
  - Kensington Palace announces that Prince William will attend the COP30 conference in Brazil in November.
  - Former prime minister Rishi Sunak takes up paid adviser roles with Microsoft and Anthropic, the earnings from which will be donated to the charity to tackle numeracy problems in the UK that he and his wife founded.
  - Councillor Rowland O'Connor resigns as deputy leader of the Reform UK group on Cornwall Council.
- 10 October –
  - Ash Regan resigns from the Alba Party in order to "focus" on her efforts to criminalise prostitution.
  - Bristol City councillor Fabian Breckels is suspended from the Labour Party over an alleged racist comment posted on Facebook.
- 12 October – Starmer arrives in Egypt ahead of an international summit on the Gaza peace process where Downing Street says he will pay "particular tribute" to the US president, Donald Trump.
- 13 October –
  - MI5 warns MPs they are being targeted in espionage operations by Russia, China and Iran.
  - The Scottish National Party conference is held in Aberdeen.
  - Councillor Rob Parsonage resigns as leader of the Reform UK group on Cornwall Council.
- 14 October –
  - The Northern Ireland Troubles Bill, designed to replace the Northern Ireland Troubles (Legacy and Reconciliation) Act 2023, receives its first reading in the House of Commons.
  - A House of Lords inquiry finds that former speaker Baroness Frances D'Souza broke rules on "personal honour" by writing to Metropolitan Police Commissioner Sir Mark Rowley on Lords headed notepaper to query multiple breaches of the 20 mph speed limit adding up to £400 in fines.
- 16 October – Liberal Democrat councillors win six council seats at county and borough level in Surrey following a series of by-elections.
- 17 October – Rupert Lowe, MP for Great Yarmouth and former Reform UK member, is given a seat on the Public Accounts Committee following support from Conservative MPs.
- 18 October – Conservative MP George Freeman says he has reported a deepfake video depicting him announcing his defection to Reform UK to the police.
- 19 October –
  - Reform UK's Linden Kemkaran, the leader of Kent County Council, threatens to expose the "cowards" who leaked a video appearing to show her swearing and telling councillors from her party to "suck it up".
  - V-levels are announced by the Department for Education as a new qualification for 16-year-olds.
- 20 October –
  - Four Reform UK councillors on Kent County Council – Paul Thomas, Oliver Bradshaw, Bill Barret and Maxine Fothergrill – are suspended from the party following leaked video footage of a heated online meeting.
  - Junior minister Claire Hughes reveals she has been diagnosed with breast cancer, and says she will step back from her role while undergoing treatment.
  - Fiona Goddard and Ellie-Ann Reynolds resign from the grooming gang inquiry panel.
- 21 October –
  - Stephen Flynn, the SNP's leader at Westminster, tables a motion urging the UK government to formally strip Prince Andrew of his royal titles following allegations made against him in the memoirs of Virginia Giuffre.
  - A third, unnamed member of the grooming gang inquiry panel, resigns.
  - Reform UK elects a new leader and deputy leader on Cornwall Council.
- 22 October –
  - Angela Rayner gives her formal resignation speech to the House of Commons after leaving the frontbench.
  - Jim Gamble becomes the second chair of the grooming gang inquiry to resign, while a fourth member resigns from the inquiry's panel as Starmer tells Prime Minister's Questions that the inquiry will look at racial and religious motives.
  - King Charles and Queen Camilla arrive in Rome ahead of a historic state visit to Vatican City, where they will meet Pope Leo XIV.
  - Reform UK's Linden Kemkaran issues a statement calling for councillors to back her in writing following advice to do so from her party's headquarters.
  - 3 Labour members of Swindon Borough Council defect to the Green Party of England and Wales.
- 23 October –
  - Lindsay Whittle wins the 2025 Caerphilly by-election for Plaid Cymru, taking the seat from Labour, who had held it since the Senedd was established in 1999.
  - The UK government says it will not give MPs parliamentary time to debate whether Prince Andrew should be stripped of his titles.
- 24 October –
  - 3 Scottish Green councillors defect to Jeremy Corbyn's Your Party, giving the party its first Scottish representatives.
  - A third Reform UK councillor on Cornwall Council resigns making the Liberal Democrats the single largest party.
- 25 October – Lucy Powell wins the 2025 Labour Party deputy leadership election.
- 26 October – Former Bank of England governor Mervyn King criticises a potential mansion tax.
- 27 October –
  - A report from the Home Affairs Select Committee claims that the Home Office has "squandered" billions of pounds of taxpayers' money on asylum accommodation.
  - Two Reform UK councillors on Kent County Council are expelled from the party for "bringing it into disrepute".
- 28 October –
  - Steve Reed, Secretary of State for Housing, Communities and Local Government, announces that Surrey County Council will be abolished and replaced by two unitary authorities; East Surrey and West Surrey.
  - Stormont appoints Pól Deeds and Lee Reynolds as Northern Ireland's first Irish language and Ulster-Scots commissioners respectively.
- 29 October –
  - Chancellor Rachel Reeves refers herself to the Parliamentary Commissioner for Standards after saying that she broke housing rules by unlawfully renting out her family home without a licence.
  - The Electoral Management Board for Scotland announces that votes for the 2026 Scottish Parliament election will be counted the day after the election rather than overnight.
- 30 October – Plaid Cymru leader Rhun ap Iorwerth and SNP leader John Swinney hold talks to develop a "progressive alliance" between the two parties.
- 31 October –
  - Prince Andrew is formally stripped of his prince title and will henceforth be known as Andrew Mountbatten-Windsor. His name is also removed from the Roll of the Peerage, but he is still eighth in the line of succession and remains a Counsellor of State.
  - Starmer announces that Chancellor Rachel Reeves will face no further action for failing to obtain the relevant licence before renting out her family home, but rebukes her for not providing him with all of the information when the story about her broke.
  - Dartford Borough Council councillor James Buchan defects from Reform UK to the Conservatives after becoming "uncomfortable" with his former party.

=== November ===
- 1 November – Sinn Féin and the Social Democratic and Labour Party say they will support a motion of no confidence in Paul Givan, Stormont's Education Minister, after he took part in a six-day visit to Israel along with other unionist politicians.
- 2 November – Former SNP Cabinet Secretary for Health Jeane Freeman blames failures faced by NHS Scotland on successive governments including her own.
- 4 November – In a pre-budget speech from Downing Street, Chancellor Rachel Reeves Chancellor Rachel Reeves says she will make "necessary choices" in the forthcoming budget after the "world has thrown more challenges our way".
- 5 November –
  - MSPs vote 85–25 in favour of the Land Reform (Scotland) Bill that aims to reduce the concentration of rural land ownership among a small number of people.
  - Charges against former SDLP leader Colum Eastwood in relation to his attendance at a pro-Palestine rally are dropped after he accepted a formal caution.
- 6 November – Culture Secretary Lisa Nandy is found to have "unknowingly" breached public appointment rules with her choice to be the boss of England's new football watchdog.
- 7 November –
  - The Labour Whip is restored to Chris Hinchliff, Neil Duncan-Jordan, Brian Leishman and Rachael Maskell following their suspension for voting against the government's Welfare Reform Bill in July.
  - Deputy First Minister of Northern Ireland Emma Little-Pengelly turns down an invite to the inauguration of President of Ireland Catherine Connolly.
- 8 November –
  - Votes for the 2026 Senedd election will be counted the day after election day rather than overnight after the polls close.
  - Robert James and Sean Morgan, two former Labour council leaders, of Carmarthenshire and Caerphilly respectively, defect to the Green Party.
- 9 November – YouGov surveys have found that Andrew Mountbatten-Windsor (formerly known as Prince Andrew) has a 13% approval rating from the general public whilst the Starmer Government has a rating of 12%.
- 10 November – Northern Ireland Education Minister Paul Givan survives a vote of no confidence after a motion proposed by People Before Profit fails to gain cross-party support.
- 12 November –
  - Starmer tells Prime Minister's Questions he has "never authorised" attacks on his cabinet ministers after his political allies within Labour told a number of media outlets he could face a leadership challenge from a prominent member of his cabinet.
  - Reform UK says it will no longer co-operate with the making of a BBC documentary about the party following the controversy involving a Donald Trump speech.
  - The Senedd Standards Commission recommends Laura Anne Jones, the Senedd's only Reform UK member, face a two-week suspension from the chamber for her use of a racial slur against Chinese people in a WhatsApp group in August 2023, while she was a member of the Welsh Conservatives.
  - Andy Osborn, a Cambridgeshire County Council member, elected to represent Reform UK, is under investigation for describing children in care as "downright evil" at a council meeting in June.
- 13 November –
  - The Home Office announces that the 41 police and crime commissioners in England and Wales will be scrapped from 2028, with their responsibilities moving to either directly elected mayors or council leaders.
  - First Minister of Scotland John Swinney confirms plans for the Scottish Government to issue its first bonds in 2026–27 after Scotland is given the same rating as the UK by credit rating agencies.
  - The House of Lords has proposed 942 amendments to the Terminally Ill Adults (End of Life) Bill.
  - Sarah Taylor, the Norfolk Police and Crime Commissioner, resigns from the Labour Party following the UK government's decision to scrap her role, citing a lack of consultation in the matter.
- 14 November –
  - Independent MP Adnan Hussain announces that he is "stepping away" from the steering group of Your Party because of what he describes as a "toxic" culture, particularly towards "Muslim men".
  - The House of Lords has asked for more time to debate the Terminally Ill Adults (End of Life) Bill.
- 16 November – Horninglow and Eton Parish Council has asked Staffordshire County Councillor Peter Mason, elected in May 2025 to represent Reform UK, to stay away from its meetings after old social media posts came to light. In response, Mason says he "regrets his choice of words" in the posts, which concerned black women and the police.
- 18 November –
  - The Northern Ireland Troubles Bill receives its second reading in the House of Commons and passes by 320 votes to 105.
  - Reform UK announces plans to cut government spending by £20bn a year if elected to government, with their plans including removing the right to claim benefits from EU citizens.
- 19 November –
  - BBC News suggests that Labour MP Clive Lewis offered to give up his Norwich South constituency to allow Andy Burnham to return to the House of Commons, paving the way for Burnham to challenge Keir Starmer for the party's leadership, although they also say that Lewis later told The Sun that he had "no plans to stand down".
  - Laura Anne Jones is suspended from the Senedd chamber for 14 days for breaking the parliamentary code over her use of a racial slur in a WhatsApp message.
  - The Guardian reports allegations that, as a child almost 50 ago, Reform's Nigel Farage made anti-Semitic comments and taught younger pupils at Dulwich College racist songs. The paper also reports that other former pupils who know Farage said that they do not recall the behaviour described. Farage denied making any of the comments that were attributed to him.
  - Andrew Polson, the former leader of Dunbartonshire Council, is sentenced to 22 months in prison for a £188,000 romance fraud.
- 20 November –
  - COVID-19 in the UK: The second report to be released by the COVID-19 Inquiry summarises the UK's response to the pandemic as "too little, too late", and says lockdown may have been unnecessary if steps such as social distancing and the isolation of those with symptoms along with members of their household had been brought in earlier than mid-March 2020.
  - Former Labour MP Lloyd Russell-Moyle defects to the Greens.
  - At a hearing at the Old Bailey, Nathan Gill, the former leader of Reform UK in Wales, pleads guilty to eight counts of bribery relating to a pro-Russian influence campaign in the European Parliament during 2018 and 2019.
- 21 November –
  - At the Old Bailey, Nathan Gill, former UKIP and later Reform UK leader in Wales, is sentenced to 10 and a half years in prison for accepting Russian bribes while in the European Parliament during 2018 and 2019.
  - Former cabinet minister Michael Gove apologises on behalf of the UK government and Conservative Party for "mistakes made" during the COVID-19 pandemic.
  - Iqbal Mohamed becomes the second MP to announce they are leaving the new left-wing party provisionally known as Your Party.
- 24 November –
  - Richard Dannatt and David Evans are scheduled to be suspended from the House of Lords for breaching parliamentary rules, including providing parliamentary services in return for "payment or reward".
  - Addressing allegations made about him from his schooldays, Farage says he has "never directly racially abused anybody".
  - Addressing his party's potential links to Russia, Farage says that Reform does not have the resources to investigate the matter.
- 26 November – The Chancellor of the Exchequer, Rachel Reeves delivers the 2025 United Kingdom budget.
- 27 November – Former Brexit Party MEP David Coburn, who is named in a series of WhatsApp messages, rejects allegations he participated in a pro-Russian influence campaign in the European Parliament.
- 28 November – In a letter to MPs, the Chairman of the Office for Budget Responsibility casts doubt on the Chancellor's pre-Budget statements about the state of the UK economy. Reeves had spoken of a downgrade in economic forecasts that would make it difficult to meet her spending rules, but the letter says an increase in wages would have made it possible.
- 29 November – The Your Party founding conference begins, but after several party members who also belong to the Socialist Workers Party are expelled, Zarah Sultana boycotts the event and accuses the party's leadership of staging a "witch hunt" against left-wing activists.
- 30 November – On the second day of its founding conference, Your Party adopts the name Your Party as its official name.

=== December ===
- 1 December –
  - A Bangladeshi court convicts MP and former minister Tulip Siddiq of corruption charges and sentences her in her absence to two years in custody. Siddiq describes the sentence as "deeply unfair".
  - Richard Hughes resigns as chair of the Office for Budget Responsibility as an inquiry is launched into how details of the November 2025 United Kingdom budget were published 40 minutes before Chancellor Rachel Reeves delivered the statement to Parliament.
  - Former Conservative MPs Jonathan Gullis, Chris Green and Lia Nici defect to Reform UK.
  - Belfast City Council votes in favour of flying the Palestinian flag above City Hall.
- 2 December –
  - The High Court rejects an emergency legal application by Traditional Unionist Voice to have the Palestinian flag taken down from Belfast City Hall.
- 3 December –
  - German President Frank-Walter Steinmeier and his wife Elke Büdenbender are welcomed by King Charles III and Queen Camilla on a state visit to the UK, the first to be made by a German leader for 27 years.
  - Markus Campbell-Savours is suspended from the Parliamentary Labour Party for rebelling against the family farm tax.
  - Reform UK launches an investigation into the online activity of Ian Cooper, the leader of Staffordshire County Council, following allegations he posted racist comments online.
- 5 December –
  - It is announced that Chancellor Rachel Reeves will not face an investigation by ethics adviser Sir Laurie Magnus over whether or not her pre-budget interventions broke the ministerial code.
  - Reform UK removes Ian Cooper, leader of Staffordshire County Council, from the party following an investigation into online racist comments.
- 6 December –
  - It is announced that transgender women will not be allowed to take part in the main event of the 2026 Labour Women's Conference.
  - Former Conservative minister and peer Malcolm Offord defects to Reform UK, and says he will stand down from the House of Lords to campaign in the 2026 Scottish Parliament election.
- 7 December – Prime Minister Keir Starmer says that Angela Rayner will return to the cabinet, describing her as "hugely talented".
- 8 December –
  - Essex Police are investigating allegations made by a former Reform UK councillor that the party overspent while campaigning in the Clacton constituency during the 2024 general election.
  - Reform UK selects Addy Mo Asaduzzaman, a Bangladeshi with indefinite leave to remain in the UK, to stand in Central Southsea at local elections in May 2026. The announcement leads to criticism of the party.
- 9 December –
  - Home Secretary Shabana Mahmood announces that former Children's Commissioner Baroness Anne Longfield will lead the inquiry into grooming gangs.
  - Thirteen Labour MPs back a Liberal Democrat bill requiring the government to begin negotiations on joining a bespoke customs union with the EU, leading to a tied vote of 100–100. In her capacity as holder of the deciding vote Deputy Speaker Caroline Noakes gives her backing to the bill, allowing for it to have further debate.
  - Ian Cooper resigns as leader of Staffordshire County Council after he was expelled by Reform UK. He will remain as an independent councillor for Tamworth. Martin Murray is appointed as temporary leader of Staffordshire County Council to replace him.
- 10 December –
  - Chancellor Rachel Reeves tells the House of Commons that there were too many pre-budget leaks prior to her speech in November.
  - Former swimmer Sharron Davies is named as one of three new Conservative peers; 25 new Labour peers and five Liberal Democrat peers are also announced.
- 11 December – Ben Bradley, a former Conservative MP and council leader, announces he is joining Reform UK.
- 12 December –
  - The Treasury Committee launches a review of the Office for Budget Responsibility after it came under close scrutiny in the run up to the budget.
  - Reform UK claims to have the largest party membership in the UK after a report in The Times that Labour's membership has fallen to below 250,000. Reform says it has 268,000 members, although political parties' figures are not externally verified.
  - Reform wins its first election in Scotland after David McLennan is elected as a councillor in Whitburn and Blackburn in West Lothian, taking the seat from Scottish Labour.
- 14 December – Writing in The Sunday Telegraph, Conservative Party leader Kemi Badenoch says her party will scrap the impending UK ban on petrol and diesel vehicles if they win the next general election.
- 15 December – Former Democratic Unionist Party councillor William Ball is sentenced to fifteen months in custody for historical sexual offences committed against a young girl.
- 16 December –
  - The UK government orders an independent review into foreign financial interference in UK politics in response to the case of Nathan Gill, the former leader of Reform UK in Wales.
  - The Employment Rights Bill passes its final vote in the House of Lords and will receive Royal ascent before Christmas.
  - It is announced that former Chancellor George Osborne is to join OpenAI.
- 17 December –
  - Labour grants six local authorities in and around London the power to raise larger council tax increases after reducing their share of government funding.
  - Starmer urges Russian oligarch Roman Abramovich to honour the pledge he made to donate the £2.5bn he made from the sale of Chelsea F.C. in 2022 to victims of the Ukraine War or he will face legal proceedings.
  - Andrea Egan is elected as general secretary of Unison, and will succeed Christina McAnea in January.
  - Former Labour mayor Jamie Driscoll joins the Green Party.
  - Independent MP Zarah Sultana begins a protest outside HMP Bronzefield in Surrey, where remand prisoner, who had spent over a year in prison awaiting trial, and Palestine Action member Qesser Zuhrah is on hunger strike. The protest demanded an ambulance be brought to the prison, where Zuhrar has been on hunger strike for 46 days. She was later transferred to hospital.
- 18 December –
  - Christian Turner is named as the UK's new ambassador to the United States, replacing Peter Mandelson.
  - It is announced that Nigel Farage will not face an investigation into claims Reform overspent during his 2024 election campaign.
- 19 December – With the UK government signalling its willingness to delay local elections due in May 2026 for a year, the Electoral Commission raises concerns about further delays to elections, describing the process as one that is "damaging public confidence".
- 21 December –
  - The Electoral Commission finds no "credible evidence of potential offences of electoral law" over Nigel Farage's election expenses.
  - Scottish Labour MSP Pam Duncan-Glancy confirms she will not seek re-election to the Scottish Parliament at the 2026 election because she does not want her friendship with a convicted sex offender to "become a distraction".
- 22 December –
  - Liberal Democrat leader Sir Ed Davey writes to the Equalities and Human Rights Commission to ask it to investigate government plans to delay local elections, which could affect as many as 10 million voters.
  - The leader of Plymouth City Council confirms that local elections there will go ahead in May, but local elections in Exeter are still uncertain.
- 23 December –
  - The UK government announces it is watering down its plans for inheritance tax on farmers, and will raise the threshold from £1m to £2.5m.
  - Local Government Secretary Steve Reed writes to councils in England warning them not to adopt a four-day working week.
  - Scotland's Justice Secretary, Angela Constance, is to face an investigation over comments she made about a grooming gang expert to determine whether she broke the ministerial code.

== Publications ==
- 14 August – Frankly by Nicola Sturgeon.

== Deaths ==
- 1 January – Sally Oppenheim-Barnes, Baroness Oppenheim-Barnes, 96, British politician, minister of state for consumer affairs (1979–1982), MP (1970–1987), and member of the House of Lords (1989–2019).
- 4 January – Jenny Randerson, Baroness Randerson, 76, Welsh politician and peer, acting Deputy First Minister of Wales (2001–2002) and member of the House of Lords (since 2011).
- 24 January – Joan Hanham, Baroness Hanham, 85, British politician, member of the House of Lords (1999–2020) and leader of the Kensington and Chelsea Council (1989–2000).
- 1 February – John Montagu, 11th Earl of Sandwich, 81, British aristocrat, businessman and politician, member of the House of Lords (1995–2024).
- 7 February – Dafydd Elis-Thomas, Baron Elis-Thomas, 78, Welsh politician, llywydd of the Senedd (1999–2011), MP (1974–1992) and member of the House of Lords (since 1992).
- 16 February – Barry Panter, politician (Mayor of Newcastle-under-Lyme), car crash. (death reported on this date)
- 19 February – Joe Haines, 97, British journalist and public servant, Downing Street press secretary (1969–1970, 1974–1976).
- 27 March – Christina McKelvie, 57, Scottish politician, MSP (since 2007), minister for culture (2023–2024) and drugs and alcohol policy (since 2024), breast cancer.
- 30 March – Stanley Kalms, Baron Kalms, 93, British businessman, chairman of Currys, and life peer, member of the House of Lords (2004–2024).
- 31 March – Janric Craig, 3rd Viscount Craigavon, 80, British hereditary peer and member of the House of Lords (since 1974)
- 23 April – Peter Taaffe, 83, British Marxist militant.
- 6 May – Terence Etherton, Baron Etherton, 73, British judge and politician, Master of the Rolls (2016–2021), chancellor of the High Court (2013–2016), and member of the House of Lords (since 2021).
- 20 May – Patrick O'Flynn, 59, British journalist (Daily Express) and politician, MEP (2014–2019), cancer. (death announced on this date)
- 13 June – Seán Neeson, 79, Northern Irish politician, MLA (1982–1986, 1998–2011).
- 1 July – David Lipsey, Baron Lipsey, 77, British journalist and life peer (since 1999).
- 7 July – Norman Tebbit, Baron Tebbit, 94, British politician, secretary of state for employment (1981–1983), chancellor of the Duchy of Lancaster (1985–1987), and MP (1970–1992).
- 9 July – Ian Blair, Baron Blair of Boughton, 72, British police officer and life peer, Commissioner of Police of the Metropolis (2005–2008), member of the House of Lords (since 2010).
- 13 July – Mark Schreiber, Baron Marlesford, 93, British politician, member of the House of Lords (since 1991).
- 17 July – Tommy Gallagher, 82, Northern Irish politician, MLA (1998–2011). (death announced on this date)
- 18 July – David Alliance, Baron Alliance, 93, Iranian-born British businessman, member of the House of Lords (2004–2025).
- 22 July – Sir Jamie McGrigor, 6th Baronet, 75, Scottish politician, MSP (1999–2016). (death announced on this date)
- 29 July – Meghnad Desai, Baron Desai, 85, Indian-born British economist and politician, member of the House of Lords (since 1991).
- 3 August – Stella Rimington, 90, British author and Director General of MI5 (1992–1996).
- 4 August – Tom Sawyer, Baron Sawyer, 82, British trade unionist and politician, member of the House of Lords (since 1998). (death announced on this date)
- 12 August –
  - Hefin David, 47, Welsh politician, Member of the Senedd (2016–2025).
  - Sir George Reid, 86, Scottish politician, presiding officer of the Scottish Parliament (2003–2007), kidney cancer.
- 20 August – Dame Annette Brooke, 78, British politician, MP (2001–2015).
- 21 August – Swraj Paul, Baron Paul, 94, Indian-born British industrialist and politician, member of the House of Lords (since 1996).
- 22 August – Martin Smyth, 94, Northern Irish politician, MLA (1982–1986) and MP (1982–2005). (death announced on this date)
- 26 August – David Warburton, 59, British politician, MP (2015–2023).
- 30 August – Tim Boswell, Baron Boswell of Aynho, 82, British politician, MP (1987–2010) and member of the House of Lords (2010–2025).
- 10 September – Alan Howarth, Baron Howarth of Newport, 81, British politician, MP (1983–2005) and member of the House of Lords (since 2005).
- 17 September – Barry Seal, 87, British politician, MEP (1979–1999), acute myeloid leukaemia.
- 18 September – Charles Guthrie, Baron Guthrie of Craigiebank, 86, British field marshal, assistant chief (1987–1989) and chief (1994–1997) of the general staff, chief of the defence staff (1997–2001), ruptured cerebral aneurysm.
- 23 September – Iain Coleman, 67, British politician, MP (1997–2005). (death announced on this date)
- 26 September – Menzies Campbell, 84, British politician, MP (1987–2015). (death announced on this date)
- 14 October – Rosalind Howells, Baroness Howells of St Davids, 94, British politician, member of the House of Lords (1999–2019).
- 20 October – Oliver Colvile, 66, British politician, MP (2010–2017).
- 25 October – Dick Taverne, 97, British politician, MP (1962–1974) and member of the House of Lords (1996–2025).
- 3 November – John Marshall, 85, British politician, MEP (1979–1989) and MP (1987–1997).
- 11 November – Helen Newlove, Baroness Newlove, 63, British community reform activist, member of the House of Lords (since 2010).
- 16 November – Mark Fisher, 81, British politician, minister for the arts (1997–1998) and MP (1983–2010).
- 17 November – David Pryce-Jones, 89, British conservative commentator, author and historian.
- 27 November – Peter Whittle, 64, British politician, member of the London Assembly (2016–2021), cancer.
- 28 November – Sir John Stanley, 83, British politician, MP (1974–2015).
- 8 December – Kate Allsop, 71, British politician, mayor of Mansfield (2015–2019). (death announced on this date)
- 17 December – Sir Patrick McNair-Wilson, 96, English politician, MP (1964–1966, 1968–1997). (death announced on this date)
- 30 December – Joe Byrne, 72, Northern Ireland politician, MLA (1998–2003, 2011–2015).
- 31 December – Mary Bradley, 83, Northern Irish politician, MLA (2003–2011). (death announced on this date)
