= Reform UK financial allegations =

Financial allegations centred on Reform UK and leader Nigel Farage

In 2026, the finances of the Reform UK political party and its leader Nigel Farage at the time of the 2024 United Kingdom general election came under scrutiny following reports by The Guardian and The Sunday Times that Farage had failed to declare donations from Christopher Harborne and George Cottrell. Farage and representatives from Reform said that Farage did not need to declare these donations as they were gifts given to him before he became an MP. Donations made by Cottrell and his mother Fiona to Reform UK during the same time period are also under investigation, with Richard Tice and George Cottrell both denying that there was anything wrong with these donations. Farage subsequently resigned from parliament in order to fight a by-election in his Clacton constituency in which he was duly re-elected.

== Nigel Farage ==
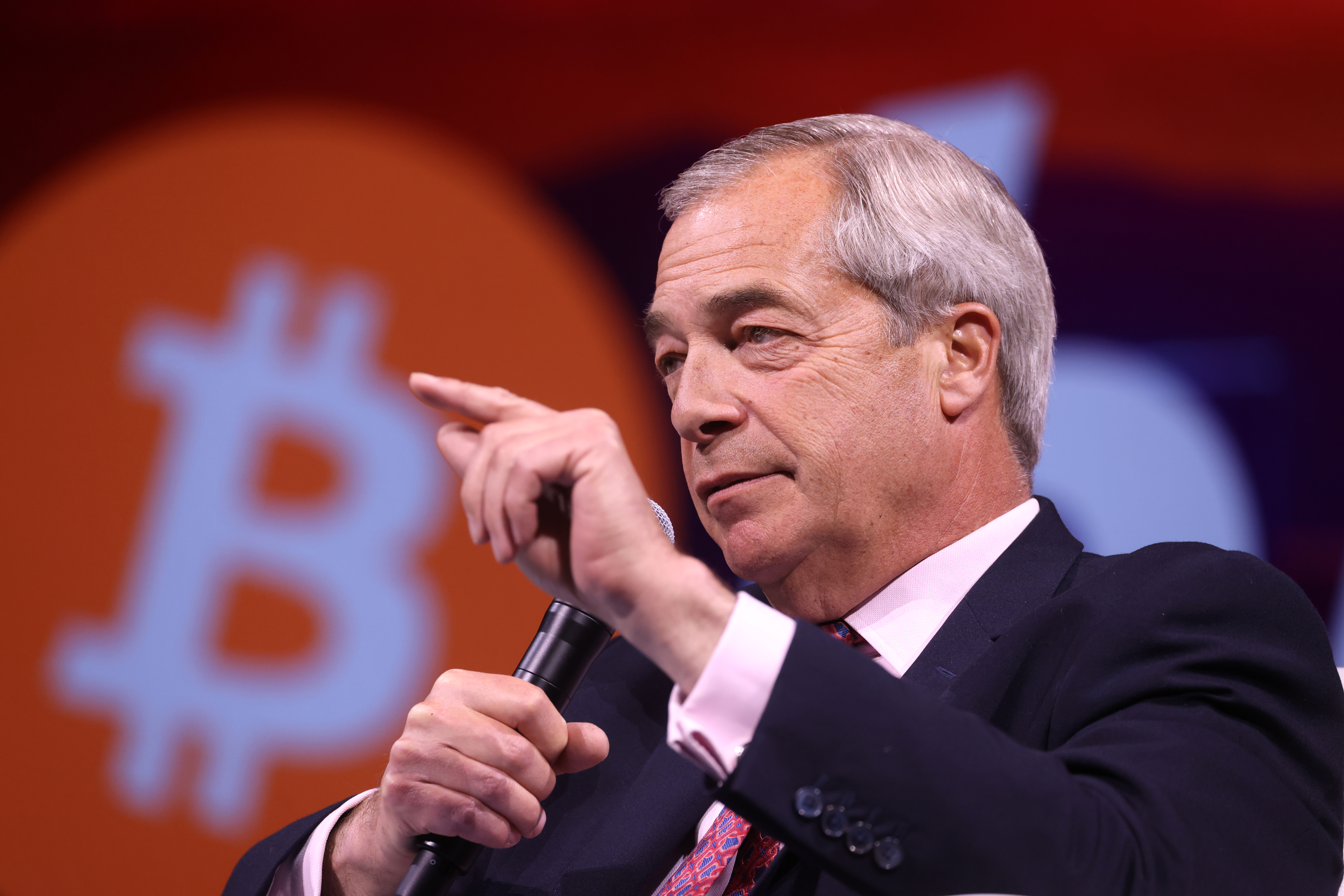
Nigel Farage speaking at the Bitcoin 2025 conference

Nigel Farage came under scrutiny for a number of issues concerning his finances:

=== Christopher Harborne donation ===
The Guardian uncovered that Nigel Farage received £5 million from Thailand-based billionaire Christopher Harborne, a cryptocurrency entrepreneur. Farage had initially declared that he did not intend to stand in the 2024 United Kingdom general election; he changed his mind weeks after receiving this donation, and was elected as a Member of Parliament for the Clacton constituency.

According to parliamentary rules, Farage had to declare any benefits received in the 12 months before becoming an MP and Farage had failed to declare this "gift". Farage said the money was given as an "unconditional gift". He also said it was given to pay for his security, that it was a reward for campaigning for Brexit and that he could spend it on whatever he wanted.

Harborne told The Daily Telegraph that the money was "to support Nigel's security not just now, but for the rest of his life", stating that at the time he made the gift "I never thought he would go back into politics".

The Parliamentary Commissioner for Standards launched an inquiry to determine if Farage had broken the rules of the House of Commons with possible punishments including suspension or expulsion from the house for the most serious breaches. Farage said he was under "no obligation" to declare the gift from Harborne because it had been given before he was an MP. If the investigation results in a suspension longer than ten sitting days or 14 calendar days, officials would circulate a recall petition in the constituency, and this would force a by-election if successful.

This payment was also referred to the National Crime Agency after the banks raised a suspicious activity report as they could not track the origin of the funds.

The Guardian reported in July that Farage had told colleagues in March 2024, prior to Harborne's gift, that he would need £1m a year to justify running to be an MP, and £5m in total to cover the 2024–2029 period. Reform have stated that the Guardian's report was incorrect.

On 3 August 2026, The Guardian reported that in March–April 2024, Farage, Tice and Cottrell had agreed that Farage would return to frontline politics. On the same day, Farage said that he: "had no intention about returning to politics, or as leader of Reform, but in the spring of that year I did talk to Richard Tice about what the liabilities would be if … I was to come back to that position".

=== George and Fiona Cottrell ===
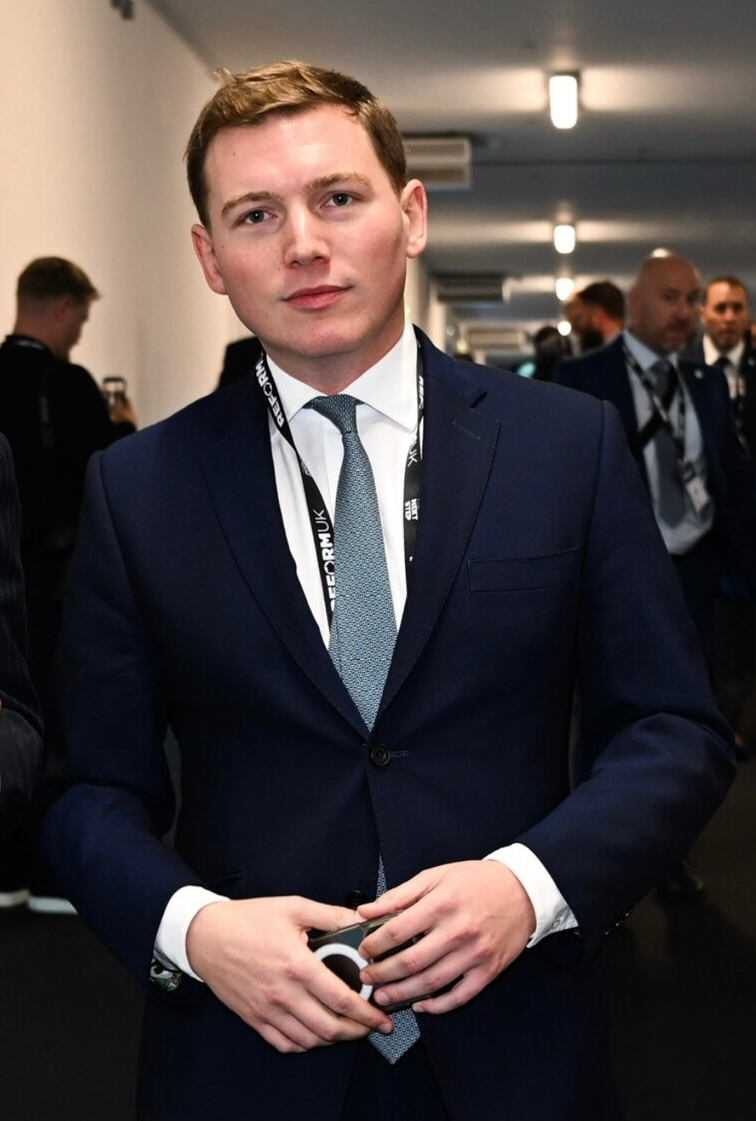
Cottrell in 2025

Farage's relationship with crypto entrepreneur and convicted fraudster George Cottrell has also come under scrutiny:

Farage had appointed Cottrell as UKIP's head of financing in 2015. In 2016 Cottrell was travelling in the US with Farage, who was giving a speech at the 2016 Republican National Convention, when he was arrested for money laundering after being caught in a sting operation and served eight months in prison following a plea deal.

He later helped to negotiate Farage's fee for appearing on I'm a Celebrity...Get Me Out of Here! and subsequently joined Farage for the 2024 election campaign. Following a report from The Sunday Times, Robert Jenrick said that during the 2024 election campaign Cottrell paid for Farage's staff to run his social media presence and security and also for accommodation, but that Farage did not need to declare them as they were gifts. Speaking on the Triggernometry podcast, Farage confirmed that Cottrell had paid for social media before the election and let Farage use one of his London homes, but that these were “totally undeclarable in every single way”.

The Guardian reported that Reform insiders have described Farage's relationship with Cottrell to be close: Tony Mack, who was selected as the Reform candidate for Clacton in 2024 before being replaced by Farage, said that Cottrell had been introduced as Farage's chief of staff. His business card contained Farage's email address. Other Reform insiders have said that Cottrell covered the cost of a 2024 fundraising lunch for potential donors, and that he arranged transport to Westminster for Reform's newly elected MPs after the election. Reform have denied that Cottrell ever had an official role in the party.

=== Bank of England meeting on cryptocurrencies ===
The Guardian reported that in a meeting with the Governor of the Bank of England, Andrew Bailey, Farage urged him to drop plans for a state-run stablecoin while championing rival stablecoin Tether, in which Christopher Harborne is heavily invested. According to Bailey, the meeting was arranged at the request of Richard Tice. Bailey also said that the meeting did not result in the bank changing any polices. Farage denied any wrongdoing and a Reform spokesperson said that Farage's remarks to Bailey were "consistent with his longheld belief that the UK should be a global hub for regulated cryptocurrency innovation and investment."

== Richard Tice ==
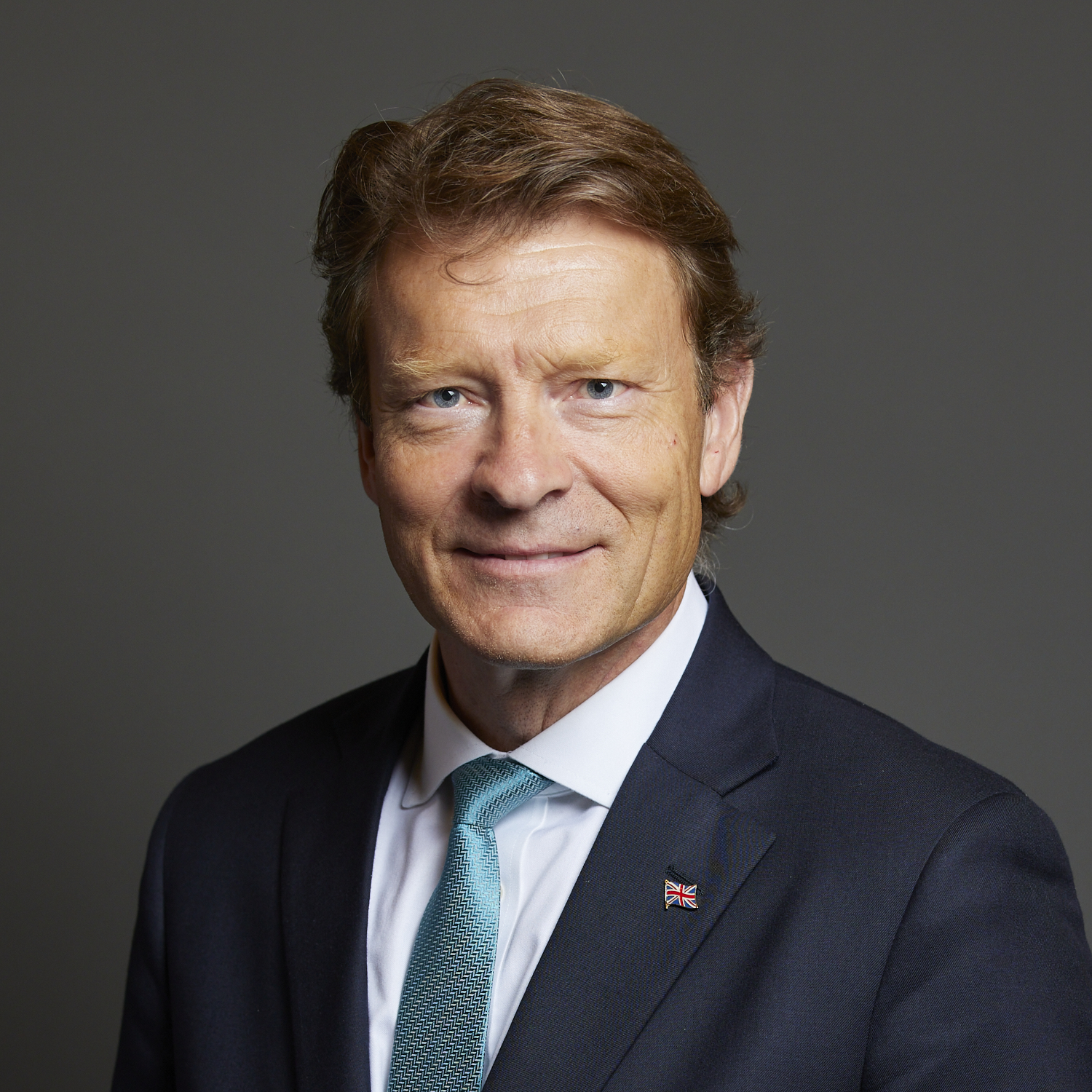
Tice in 2024

In July 2026, it was reported that donations received by Richard Tice were flagged to the National Crime Agency as part of its Suspicious Activity Reports programme. George Cottrell gave Tice's company Tisun Investment an £80,000 loan in late 2024, and in June 2024, Cottrell's mother Fiona Cottrell donated £1 million to Tice's think tank Britain Means Business, which would then donate £500,000 to Reform UK the same month. Tice said that he was not aware that it was being investigated and that Fiona Cottrell is a permissible donor.

Tice subsequently wrote to Graeme Biggar, the director general of the National Crime Agency (NCA), urging him to investigate whether the body is responsible for leaking his financial information to the media. Tice said: "This appears to be a deliberate tactic to smear and discredit me. I have nothing to hide." The Daily Telegraph reported that the NCA had opened an investigation into the allegations of staff leaking Tice's information.

The BBC reported on 25 July that the police were investigating two donations of £250,000 each to Reform UK from Britain Means Business. In response, Tice stated that the report was "a disgraceful hit piece by the BBC, who will be hearing from my lawyers."

In July 2026, the Liberal Democrat MP, Lisa Smart, referred Tice to the parliamentary standards commissioner. Her allegation was that, by failing to declare the £80,000 loan he had received from George Cottrell in 2024, Tice may have breached the MPs' code of conduct. On 30 July, the commissioner rejected the referral, saying there was insufficient evidence in the complaint to justify an investigation.

On 3 August 2026, the parliamentary standards commissioner confirmed that an investigation into Richard Tice had been opened the previous week. Tice posted on X saying that the investigation was over "whether I should have referenced my register of interests at the start of a debate on UK democracy and Israeli influence" and that "Contrary to garbage in media: Standards Commissioner is considering complaint by anti semitic anti Israel lobby group over whether I should have referenced my register of interests at start of a debate on UK democracy and Israeli influence."

== Reform UK financing ==
=== Donations from George and Fiona Cottrell ===
In addition to the money donated to Britain Means Business, Fiona Cottrell also made two £250,000 donations to Reform UK in May 2024, the Metropolitan Police began an investigation into these donations in February 2025 to determine if they were intended to conceal a donation by an impermissible donor following a referral from the Electoral Commission; George Cottrell's lawyers said that he was a permissible donor and that his mother's donations were her own decision. On 9 July 2026 the Met announced that two individuals had been interviewed under caution as part of the investigation, though no arrests have been made. Richard Tice said that these allegations were part of a "politically motivated smear campaign".

In addition to monetary donations, The Times also reported that after the election George Cottrell personally purchased thousands of pounds worth of office supplies such as computers and software and failed to declare them to the Electoral Commission as required by law. A party spokesperson said "the party was confident it had complied with all donations rules.

Later that month, The Times reported that Reform UK's bank account with Arbuthnot Latham had been suspended at one point in 2024 following Cottrell's donations.

On 29 July 2026, The Guardian reported that more than $2m was transferred from George Cottrell to his mother, Fiona Cottrell, shortly before her 2024 donations to Reform UK, which were made both directly to the party, and via Britain Means Business.

On 8 August it was reported that Farage and Tice were suing the National Crime Agency over alleged leaks of financial information.

=== £36 Million Donations from Ben Delo and Christopher Harborne ===
On 11 September Ben Delo, a billionaire who co-founded the cryptocurrency exchange BitMEX and who was pardoned by US President Donald Trump in 2025 after pleading guilty for failing to prevent money laundering on BitMEX, donated £36 million to Reform UK, the largest donation to a political party in British history to that date. He said that the purpose of the donation was to "level the playing field" against the Conservatives and Labour. The donation was criticised by both a Labour spokesperson and the Liberal Democrat Cabinet Office spokesperson, Lisa Smart, with Smart calling on Prime Minister Andy Burnham to "introduce a cap on political donations". The following day, Christopher Harborne, matched Delo's £36 million donation, saying that his "competitive spirit" had inspired him, and that the donation was his "philanthropic gift to our country". The £72 million in donations exceeded total donations to all UK political parties combined in 2025.

== Undercover foreign donor documentary ==
External videos
- My Year Undercover in Reform UK — Upload by Verbatim Investigations onto YouTube

James Orr speaking at AmericaFest 2025

In September 2026, Reform Head of Policy James Orr and Dan Jukes, a close aide to Nigel Farage, appeared in undercover reporting showing Orr and Jukes arrange for an American company to fund three polls on behalf of the party, which would break campaign finance laws. Later, Jukes and Orr separately proposed ways that donations from inadmissible donors could be hidden by donating through a British intermediary. Jukes said that the party had carried out such activities several times already.

The polls commissioned by Reform appeared in UK newspapers such as The Times ahead of the 2026 local elections. When the polls were published, the public was not aware these were commissioned by Reform UK, and an "off the book" backer, with the polling costing £32,000 in total.

Orr told the would-be donor: "We just don't have British resident donors, British entities, that would support us. That's the grim reality ... there are quite a few people in your position ... who can't declare [funding]." Introducing the undercover reporter to party supporters, Jukes said: "Those little clandestine projects are so valuable." Orr was recorded saying: "Am I gonna tell anyone... obviously not, so the reality is we could easily get away with it." He said there was little chance of consequences because the regulator, the Electoral Commission, was "so dumb and ineffective". Of the payments, Orr said that Farage "doesn't know, won't know. It's the kind of thing he would rather not know." In July, after resigning as MP amid allegations regarding the Harborne gift, Nigel Farage met the undercover donor in person to discuss a potential £500,000 donation, and thanked him for paying for the polling. Sharing champagne and oysters over lunch, Farage stated that the polling was "amazing" and provided "bang for buck".

Following the report, both Orr and Jukes stepped down and Reform announced an internal probe into the matter. Jukes denied breaking any law. Orr said he would co-operate fully with Reform's internal investigation. Reform UK chair Lee Anderson said that there was "no chance" of either Jukes or Orr returning. The University of Cambridge announced it would be examining Orr's conduct in respect to his position as associate professor. Farage told the BBC that he "wasn't even listening" during the conversation with the donor.

JL Partners, the polling agency involved, admitted to a "lapse of judgment" for not "proactively" telling media outlets who commissioned the polling. In the recordings, JL Partners co-founder James Johnson appeared to have confirmed that he did not follow transparency rules. The British Polling Council said it was "clear there have been breaches" of its rules by JL Partners.

=== Reactions to documentary ===
The documentary prompted condemnation from other political parties including Labour and the Liberal Democrats. Labour chair Bridget Phillipson said the events had "exposed how completely unfit [Nigel Farage] is for office". Liberal Democrat MP Lisa Smart and Phillipson confirmed they have reported concerns of electoral misconduct to the police, while a spokesperson for the Greens has called for an investigation.

The Financial Times wrote: "The apparent disdain for rules and institutions is reflected in the whole approach of a party moulded in its leader's image. Farage told his conference that a Reform government in its first 100 days would not allow the House of Lords, the judiciary or the civil service to get in its way. There is an echo here of the Donald Trump playbook, in which legal norms and oversight are dismissed as the scheming of a hostile establishment."

The Times wrote: "Nigel Farage must be open about what he actually thought was going on as he ate oysters and drank champagne with 'impermissible' potential donors … The rules still matter. Honesty matters. For all its flaws, Britain is not yet a country in which corruption has become entrenched. Nor does it wish to be."

The Guardian wrote: "Reform's problem is not that two aides forgot about the rules. It is that senior figures appear to have understood them, discussed how to circumvent them and assumed that nobody able to stop them would find out. A party accused of plotting how to get around the law is now promising to impose a 'national emergency' so that judges and officials will not get in its way. That is a telling and ominous reveal about how Reform understands power."

== Reactions ==
On 7 July 2026, Nigel Farage resigned as MP for Clacton and declared his intention to run in the resulting 2026 Clacton by-election. In his resignation announcement Farage said that the investigations were being used as a political tool against him, and that he wanted the voters of Clacton to be the ultimate judge of his actions. He insisted he had done nothing wrong, but that the establishment was out to get him. He said that he was the most targeted politician in Britain, and thus needed private security and that he intended to use the £5m to cover that for the rest of his life.

Farage also accused the media of harassing his family in relation to the controversy, and said that the media turning up outside his daughter's home was the "final straw", writing a letter to Ofcom demanding an apology from Sky News. Sky News subsequently denied contacting anyone from Farage's family and said that Farage himself had used the house as a backdrop for photoshoots in the past.

Farage's decision to resign as an MP to run in the by-election was criticised as a publicity stunt by other political parties, with all major UK political parties refusing to stand a candidate at the by-election. Farage denied it was a publicity stunt, stating: "The media are judging me to be a dishonest person, so it is only fair to say to the voters, 'you judge'."

The Guardian reported that Reform UK issued internal briefing documents to its councillors which included instructions to describe investigations into donations to the party as an "establishment stitch-up".

Reform has received criticism due to the lack of transparency regarding its financing and the unclear ultimate source of the donations the party has received.

== Criminal investigation ==
On 9 September 2026, the Metropolitan Police announced that they are carrying out a criminal investigation into allegations Reform UK broke the law in relation to foreign funding, following a broadcast by Channel 4 News. A Reform UK spokesman said the party "denies any wrongdoing and will fully cooperate with the investigation".
