= James Orr (academic) =

British academic and philosopher (born 1978)

- Orr in 2025

Senior Adviser to the Leader of Reform UK
- In office October 2025 – 4 September 2026
- Leader: Nigel Farage

Head of Policy for Reform UK
- In office 17 February 2026 – 4 September 2026
- Leader: Nigel Farage
- Preceded by: Zia Yusuf
- Succeeded by: TBA

Personal details
- Born: James Tristan Ward Orr; November 1978 (age 47–48)
- Citizenship: British
- Party: Reform UK
- Occupations: Academic, lawyer
- Spouse: Helen Orr

Academic background
- Education: Balliol College, Oxford (MA); St. John’s College, Cambridge (MPhil, PhD)
- Thesis: Divine lawmaking : a conceptualist account (2015)

Academic work
- Discipline: Philosophy
- Sub-discipline: Philosophy of religion
- Institutions: University of Oxford; University of Cambridge
- Website: www.divinity.cam.ac.uk/directory/dr-james-orr

James Tristan Ward Orr (born November 1978) is a British theologian, philosopher, and former senior adviser to Reform UK.

== Early life and education ==
Orr was born in 1978. His parents were lawyers. The family lived in Brussels until Orr was nine years old and he spoke French as his first language. He was educated at Winchester College and read classics at Balliol College, Oxford. He became a corporate lawyer, first at Freshfields, then Sullivan & Cromwell, in London. In 2003, Orr had a religious awakening and took part in the Alpha course at Holy Trinity Brompton in Knightsbridge. He left his career in law to do a Master of Philosophy followed by a PhD in philosophy of religion at St John's College, Cambridge.

== Career ==
As of 2025, Orr is an associate professor of philosophy of religion at the Faculty of Divinity, University of Cambridge; he had previously spent four years as a postdoctoral fellow at the McDonald Centre of Theology, Ethics, and Public Life at Christ Church, Oxford.

Orr is a national conservative commentator and has been described by US vice-president JD Vance as his "British sherpa". He has written for many publications on the themes of Christianity, academic freedom and the Trump-Vance administration.

Orr serves as chair of the Edmund Burke Foundation, which aims to strengthen the principles of national conservatism, and as a member of the advisory council of the Free Speech Union. He chairs the advisory board of the Centre for a Better Britain, a think tank formerly known as Resolute 1850. Orr is a fellow at the private Ralston College in Savannah, Georgia, which is funded by Paul Marshall, the owner of GB News and The Spectator.

Orr has links with numerous figures in politics. In 2021 he invited Jordan Peterson to speak at the University of Cambridge.

Orr is a director of the Roger Scruton Legacy Foundation (RSLF), which has received funding of £512,500 (almost all of its income) from the Mathias Corvinus Collegium (MCC) in Hungary. MCC is funded by government-provided shares in the Hungarian multinational oil company MOL Group, which refines oil from Russia and elsewhere. In turn, the RSLF funds the Cambridge Scrutonian Society, an invitation-only discussion group founded by Orr's proteges Jack Haughton and Mateusz Dziuda. The RSLF stated in an MCC grant application that it intends to spread its model around the UK and Europe.

Orr was involved in a debate around free speech at Cambridge; in 2020 he was one of those behind an amendment to the university's "Statement on Freedom of Speech" which replaced the word "respect" for the opinions of others with "tolerance".

In 2022 and 2025, Orr was the subject of complaints regarding his conduct towards two postgraduate students at Cambridge. The university paid £5,000 in compensation to one student.

== Politics ==
Politico has described Orr as a leading figure in the British national conservative movement. In October 2025, Orr was appointed as a senior adviser to Nigel Farage, the leader of Reform UK. From February 2026 until his resignation in September, Orr was Reform UK's Head of Policy. Journalist Katherine Stewart stated that Orr is at the centre of a "movement towards religious nationalism". Orr rejects the label of Christian nationalism as an American import.

Orr favours traditional gender roles and opposes abortion at any stage in foetal development, including in cases of rape. He has described asylum seekers as "invaders", and has called immigration the "most existential threat facing our nation since the Norman invasion". Orr has argued that universities need to be "decolonised" from a "new form of soft imperialism, an ideology that is dividing us from each other, politicising our culture, and eroding our freedoms". He regards Russia's invasion of Ukraine as a "regional Slavic conflict".

Orr has developed relationships with political figures such as Viktor Orbán, Peter Thiel and JD Vance. He praised Orbán as "the calibre of statesman we saw in the 19th century: a Castlereagh, a Metternich, a Bismarck, a Palmerston". Writing for New Humanist, Katherine Stewart accused Orr of promoting "a persecution narrative – specifically, persecution of conservative Christians at the hands of a malignant liberal elite". She criticised Orr for defending Vance's claims about free speech in the UK while both Vance and Orr support the Orbán government, whose "anti-democratic Hungarian regime", she said, "suppresses speech as a matter of routine". In May 2025, Orr said that "a lot more people have got into trouble for free speech offences in the UK than in Putin's Russia".

In July 2025, addressing the Mathias Corvinus Collegium's annual MCC Feszt in Esztergom, Hungary, Orr praised the Trump administration's trade wars. He accused Britain of being infected with "Ukraine Brain", and rejected comparisons between Putin and Hitler as "naive and dangerous". He praised the Orbán government for blocking EU military aid to Ukraine and sanctions on Russia.

Elsewhere at the festival, Orr said that there is "very little that looks worth conserving" in the "institutional landscape of Britain at the moment". Recalling the sieges by Babylonian king Nebuchadnezzar II, Orr said: "I believe in Britain and I believe in its future and I believe in its people and its institutions, but my goodness there needs to be a lot of clearing out, a lot of burning down and a lot of reconstruction, a lot of restoration."

In August 2025, Orr predicted that there would be "a radical lurch to the Right over the next five to ten years".

Orr has appeared on BBC Radio 4 for the Today podcast and the Moral Maze.

=== Political finance accusations ===
In September 2026, Orr and Dan Jukes, a close aide to Nigel Farage, appeared in undercover reporting featured on Channel 4 News. The footage showed Orr and Jukes arrange for an American company to fund three polls on behalf of the party, which would break campaign finance laws. Orr was recorded saying: "Am I gonna tell anyone... obviously not, so the reality is we could easily get away with it." He said there was little chance of consequences because the regulator, the Electoral Commission, was "so dumb and ineffective". Orr told the would-be donor: "We just don't have British resident donors, British entities, that would support us. That's the grim reality ... there are quite a few people in your position ... who can't declare [funding]." Of the payments, Orr said that Nigel Farage "doesn't know, won't know. It's the kind of thing he would rather not know." After resigning as MP amid other financial allegations, Farage met the undercover foreign donor in person to discuss a potential £500,000 donation via a British intermediary, and thanked him for paying for the polling.

Orr did not respond to the report but was understood to deny the allegations, and Reform released a statement calling the investigation a "hoax" orchestrated by climate change activists. Reform UK opened an internal investigation into Orr. Orr stood down from his position the following day pending the outcome of the investigation. The chair of Reform UK, Lee Anderson, said that there was "no chance" of Orr returning. The Metropolitan Police launched a criminal investigation into the donations. Cambridge University announced it would be examining Orr's conduct in respect to his position as associate professor.

== Personal life ==
Orr's wife, Helen Orr, is an Anglican vicar in Bassingbourn cum Kneesworth. Her father was Simon Barrington-Ward, a Church of England bishop, and her grandfather was Robert Barrington-Ward, a barrister and editor of The Times.

Orr and his family live in a riverside home on the outskirts of Cambridge. They own a number of buildings around the house which they let as lodgings to a small group of Cambridge postgraduate students. They have hosted political and academic visitors such as Peter Thiel, JD Vance, Jordan Peterson and Douglas Murray. Orr has referred to his home and the surrounding buildings as a "compound", as well as a "right-wing Mecca", and his wife has likened it to a monastic college. Helen holds morning prayers for the residents in a makeshift chapel.

Orr has said that he considered the American right-wing political activist Charlie Kirk a friend.
