= Centre for a Better Britain =

British think tank

CFABB logo

The Centre for a Better Britain (CFABB), formerly known as Resolute 1850, is a British political think tank founded in 2025. Its earlier name was a reference to HMS Resolute, from which timber was used to make the US President's Resolute Desk.

According to the Financial Times, the organisation is planning "Trump-style" changes to British government. The Times has described the scale of its ambitions as having "echoes of Project 2025", the political initiative behind the second Trump presidency.

The CFABB was founded by Jonathan Brown, the former chief operating officer of Reform UK. According to DeSmog, it is backed by the British investors Mark Thompson and David Lilley.

It is associated with the British academic James Orr, a leading figure in the British national conservative movement, who chairs its advisory board. The YouTuber Archie Manners has been hired to provide communications and social media advice.

The CFABB is based in Millbank Tower, a building that houses the headquarters of multiple political organisations, including Reform UK.

According to The Times, the CFABB has also incorporated operations in the United States and Canada. Its founder Jonathon Brown has stated that the CFABB is seeking to raise £25m to further its objectives.

CFABB has been awarded the lowest possible rating - an E-rating - by the Think Tank Transparency project Who Funds You?
