= Dan Jukes =

British political communications adviser

Daniel James Jukes
- Occupation: Public relations consultant
- Known for: Long-term media aide to Nigel Farage

Daniel James Jukes is a British political communications adviser and public relations consultant. He has worked with Nigel Farage and figures associated with Reform UK.

== Career ==
In 2014, Jukes was active in Young Independence, the youth wing of the UK Independence Party. Prospect reported that he was an elections officer for the group and was involved in an email campaign directed at Labour politician Chuka Umunna.

In December 2016, PRWeek reported that Jukes would become Farage's press officer from 1 January 2017, succeeding Michael Heaver. The following year, PRWeek reported that Farage employed Jukes for public relations support.

In June 2024, The Guardian described Jukes as Farage's long-term media aide and reported that he helped with Farage's social media during Farage's appearance on I'm a Celebrity...Get Me Out of Here!. In February 2025, the newspaper identified him as part of Farage's circle at Reform UK and described him as a long-term aide and director of communications.

=== Undercover foreign donor documentary ===
In September 2026, Jukes and Reform UK's Head of Policy, James Orr, appeared in undercover reporting featured on Channel 4 News. The footage showed Jukes arrange for an American company to fund three polls on behalf of the party and suggest a way to donate £500k, which would break campaign finance laws. Jukes did not respond to the allegations but was understood to deny them. On 4 September 2026, the following day, Jukes stepped down from his position.
