= Deborah Taylor (judge) =

British barrister and judge

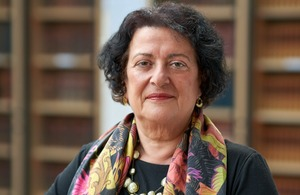
Deborah Taylor

Deborah Frances Taylor is a retired British barrister and judge. She served as resident judge at Southwark Crown Court and recorder of Westminster until her retirement in 2022. She was chair of the Medical Practitioners Tribunal Service from March 2023- April 2025. She was chair of the Criminal Legal Aid Advisory Board from 2023 -2025. On 22 April 2025, Secretary of State for Justice Shabana Mahmood announced that Taylor would lead an inquiry into the 2023 Nottingham attacks during which three people were stabbed to death by Valdo Calocane.
