= Nuneaton and Bedworth Borough Council elections =

Local government elections in Warwickshire, England

Nuneaton and Bedworth Borough Council elections are held every other year, with half the council being elected each time. Nuneaton and Bedworth Borough Council is the local authority for the non-metropolitan district of Nuneaton and Bedworth in Warwickshire, England. Since the last boundary changes in 2002, 34 councillors have been elected from 17 wards. Prior to 2002 elections were held three years out of every four, with a third of the council elected each time.

== Council elections ==
- 1973 Nuneaton Borough Council election
- 1976 Nuneaton Borough Council election
- 1979 Nuneaton Borough Council election (New ward boundaries)
- 1980 Nuneaton Borough Council election
- 1982 Nuneaton and Bedworth Borough Council election
- 1983 Nuneaton and Bedworth Borough Council election
- 1984 Nuneaton and Bedworth Borough Council election
- 1986 Nuneaton and Bedworth Borough Council election
- 1987 Nuneaton and Bedworth Borough Council election
- 1988 Nuneaton and Bedworth Borough Council election
- 1990 Nuneaton and Bedworth Borough Council election
- 1991 Nuneaton and Bedworth Borough Council election
- 1992 Nuneaton and Bedworth Borough Council election
- 1994 Nuneaton and Bedworth Borough Council election (Borough boundary changes took place but the number of seats remained the same)
- 1995 Nuneaton and Bedworth Borough Council election
- 1996 Nuneaton and Bedworth Borough Council election
- 1998 Nuneaton and Bedworth Borough Council election
- 1999 Nuneaton and Bedworth Borough Council election
- 2000 Nuneaton and Bedworth Borough Council election
- 2002 Nuneaton and Bedworth Borough Council election (New ward boundaries reduced the number of seats by 11)
- 2004 Nuneaton and Bedworth Borough Council election
- 2006 Nuneaton and Bedworth Borough Council election
- 2008 Nuneaton and Bedworth Borough Council election
- 2010 Nuneaton and Bedworth Borough Council election
- 2012 Nuneaton and Bedworth Borough Council election
- 2014 Nuneaton and Bedworth Borough Council election
- 2016 Nuneaton and Bedworth Borough Council election
- 2018 Nuneaton and Bedworth Borough Council election
- 2021 Nuneaton and Bedworth Borough Council election
- 2022 Nuneaton and Bedworth Borough Council election
- 2024 Nuneaton and Bedworth Borough Council election (New ward boundaries increased the number of seats by 4)
- 2026 Nuneaton and Bedworth Borough Council election

== Results maps ==
2002 results map

2004 results map

2006 results map

2008 results map

2010 results map

2012 results map

2014 results map

2016 results map

2018 results map

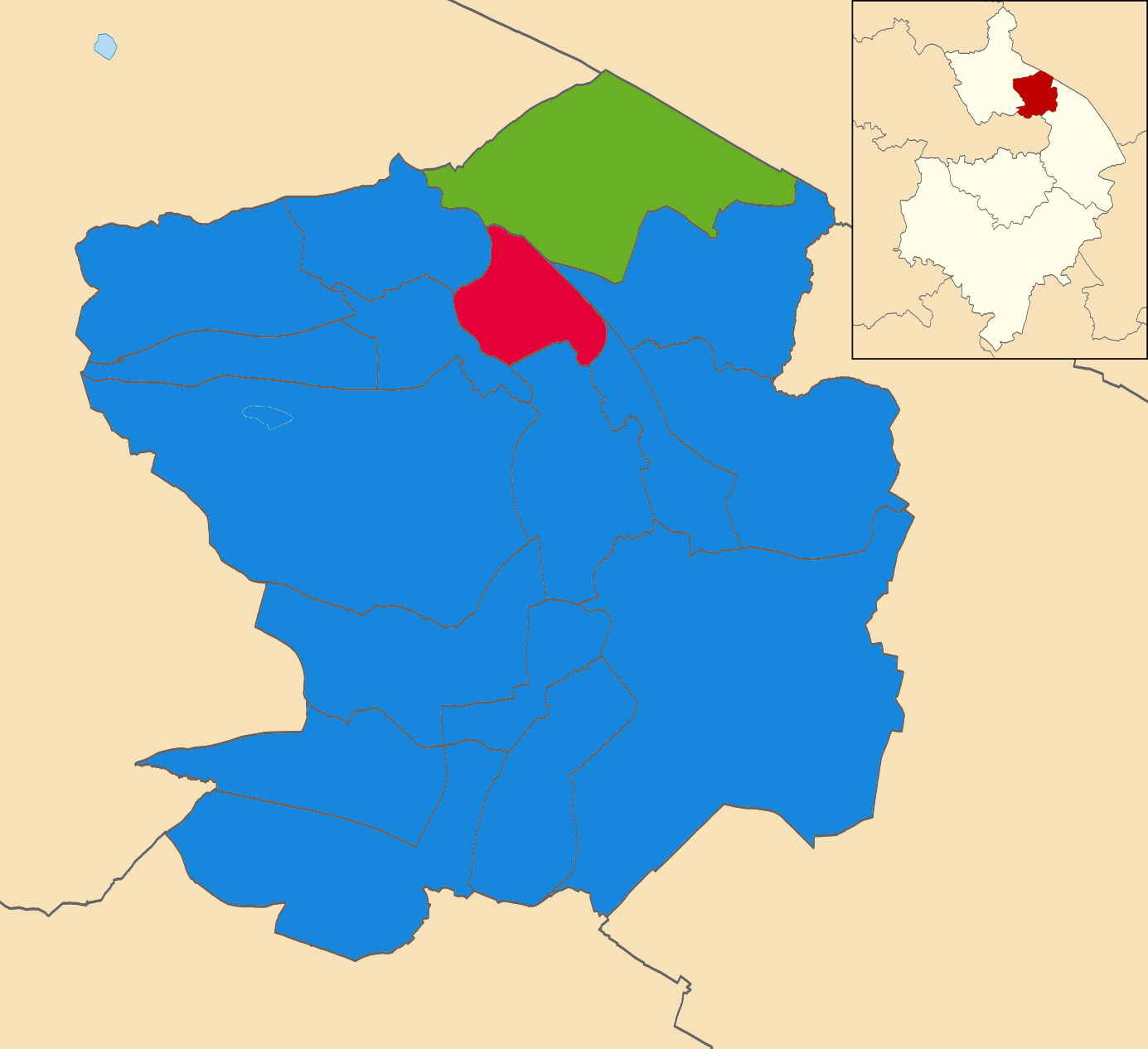
2021 results map

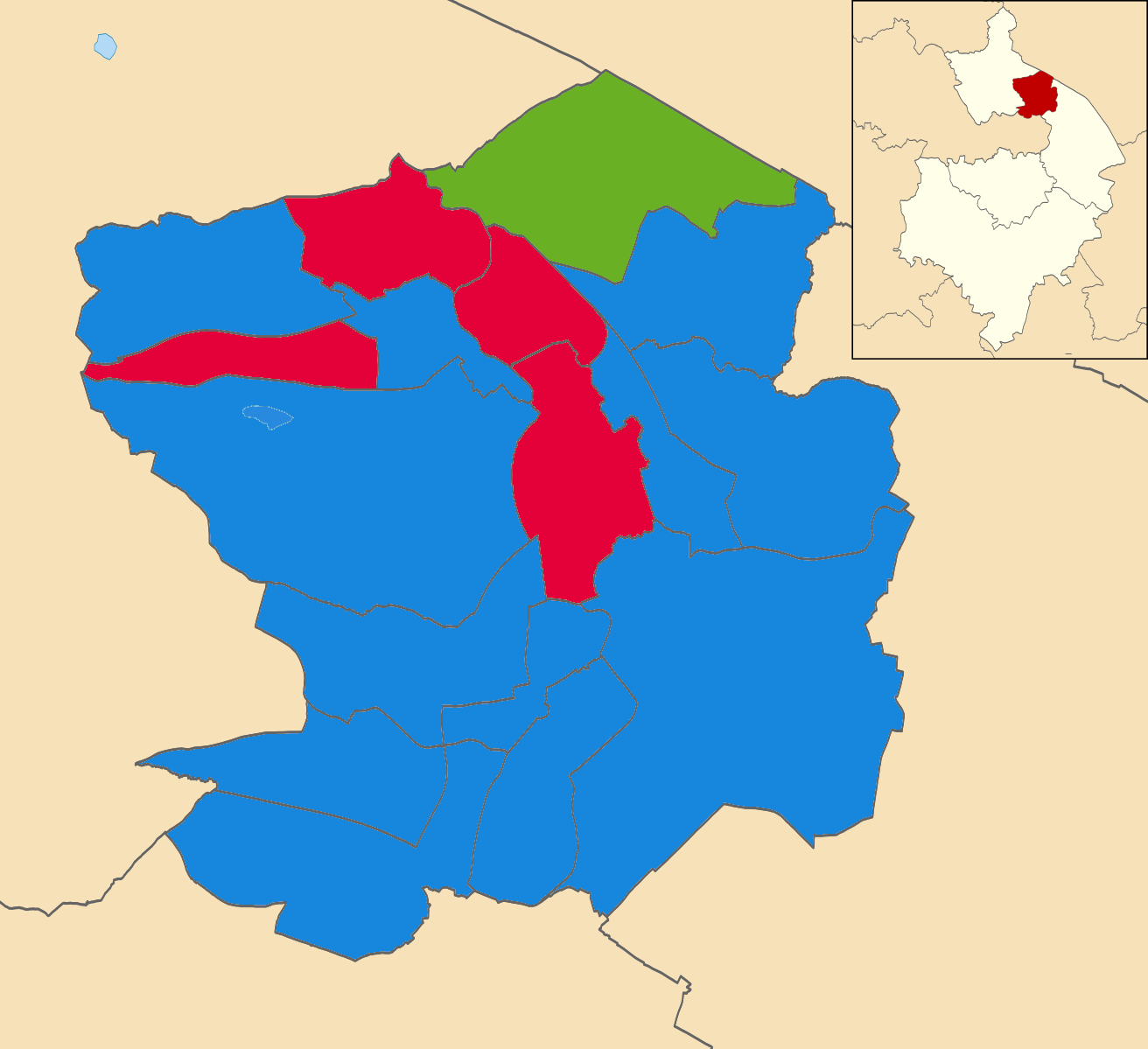
2022 results map

2024 results map

2026 results map

== By-election results ==
=== 1994-1998 ===
Arbury By-Election 1 May 1997
| Party | Candidate | Votes | % | ±% |
|---|---|---|---|---|
| Labour | | 2,949 | 58.7 | −12.7 |
| Conservative | | 1,343 | 26.7 | +12.3 |
| Liberal Democrats | | 735 | 14.6 | +0.4 |
| Majority | | 1,606 | 32.0 | |
| Turnout | | 5,027 | | |
| Labour hold | | Swing | | |

=== 2004-2008 ===
Bar Pool By-Election 5 May 2005
| Party | Candidate | Votes | % | ±% |
|---|---|---|---|---|
| Labour | Roma Taylor | 1,507 | 50.8 | +5.4 |
| Conservative | Sonja Wilson | 846 | 28.5 | +1.4 |
| Liberal Democrats | Glen Dunton | 615 | 20.7 | +20.7 |
| Majority | | 661 | 22.3 | |
| Turnout | | 2,968 | | |
| Labour hold | | Swing | | |

Whitestone By-Election 9 June 2005
| Party | Candidate | Votes | % | ±% |
|---|---|---|---|---|
| Conservative | Marcus Jones | 1,034 | 68.8 | −3,2 |
| Labour | Jef Hun | 248 | 16.5 | −11.5 |
| Liberal Democrats | Julie Fox | 220 | 14.6 | +14.6 |
| Majority | | 786 | 52.3 | |
| Turnout | | 1,502 | 26.1 | |
| Conservative hold | | Swing | | |

Bede By-Election 8 February 2007
| Party | Candidate | Votes | % | ±% |
|---|---|---|---|---|
| Labour | Valerie Richardson | 658 | 37.6 | −17.3 |
| BNP | Alwyn Deacon | 546 | 31.2 | +31.2 |
| Conservative | Damon Brown | 301 | 17.2 | −27.9 |
| Liberal Democrats | Alice Field | 119 | 6.8 | +6.8 |
| English Democrat | David Lane | 75 | 4.3 | +4.3 |
| Save Our NHS | Vanessa Casey | 43 | 2.5 | +2.5 |
| UKIP | Nigel Lanigan | 8 | 0.5 | +0.5 |
| Majority | | 112 | 6.4 | |
| Turnout | | 1,750 | 36.0 | |
| Labour hold | | Swing | | |

Slough By-Election 28 June 2007
| Party | Candidate | Votes | % | ±% |
|---|---|---|---|---|
| Labour | Jeffrey Hunt | 862 | 40.5 | −2.4 |
| BNP | Alwyn Deacon | 582 | 27.3 | +27.3 |
| Conservative | John Ison | 499 | 23.4 | −15.0 |
| English Democrat | John Lane | 102 | 4.8 | +4.8 |
| Liberal Democrats | Frank Mills | 83 | 3.9 | −14.8 |
| Majority | | 280 | 13.2 | |
| Turnout | | 2,128 | 40.6 | |
| Labour gain from Conservative | | Swing | | |

Abbey By-Election 20 September 2007
| Party | Candidate | Votes | % | ±% |
|---|---|---|---|---|
| Labour | Jill Sheppard | 807 | 37.9 | −1.0 |
| BNP | Alwyn Deacon | 457 | 21.5 | +21.5 |
| Liberal Democrats | Mish Whitmore | 409 | 19.2 | −16.5 |
| Conservative | Stephen Paxton | 329 | 15.5 | −9.9 |
| Green | Keith Kondakor | 115 | 5.4 | +5.4 |
| Independent | Scott Harbison | 10 | 0.5 | +0.5 |
| Majority | | 350 | 16.4 | |
| Turnout | | 2,127 | 38.9 | |
| Labour gain from Liberal Democrats | | Swing | 13.6 | |

=== 2008-2010 ===
Camp Hill By-Election 10 December 2009
| Party | Candidate | Votes | % | ±% |
|---|---|---|---|---|
| Labour | Ian Lloyd | 670 | 47.1 | +17.0 |
| BNP | Alwyn Deacon | 478 | 33.6 | −2.6 |
| Conservative | Kristofer David Wilson | 275 | 19.3 | −9.7 |
| Majority | | 192 | 13.5 | |
| Turnout | | 1,426 | 27.6 | |
| Labour gain from BNP | | Swing | | |

=== 2010-2014 ===
Bar Pool By-election 5 May 2011
| Party | Candidate | Votes | % | ±% |
|---|---|---|---|---|
| Labour | Vicky Fowler | 1034 | 51.6 | +6.8 |
| Conservative | Mike Bannister | 519 | 25.9 | −1.0 |
| BNP | Alwyn Deacon | 204 | 10.2 | −1.5 |
| Liberal Democrats | Andrew Crichton | 142 | 7.1 | −8.2 |
| UKIP | Andreas Hammerschmiedt | 65 | 3.2 | +3.2 |
| TUSC | Tom Sidwell | 38 | 1.9 | +0.7 |
| Majority | | 515 | 25.7 | |
| Turnout | | 2002 | | |
| Labour hold | | Swing | | |

Arbury By-Election 5 December 2013
| Party | Candidate | Votes | % | ±% |
|---|---|---|---|---|
| Conservative | Jeff Morgan | 395 | 40.34 | |
| Labour | Tricia Elliott | 369 | 37.69 | |
| UKIP | Trevor Beard | 109 | 11.13 | |
| Green | Michael Wright | 55 | 5.61 | |
| BNP | Alwyn Deacon | 35 | 3.57 | |
| TUSC | Aidan O'Toole | 8 | 0.81 | |
| English Democrat | Stephen Paxton | 6 | 0.61 | |
| Majority | | 26 | 2.65 | |
| Turnout | | 979 | | |
| Conservative gain from Labour | | Swing | 13.6% | |

=== 2014-2018 ===
Bulkington By-Election 4 May 2017
| Party | Candidate | Votes | % | ±% |
|---|---|---|---|---|
| Conservative | Richard Smith | 1651 | 76 | +40.3 |
| Labour | Jack Bonner | 517 | 24 | −12 |
| Majority | | 1134 | 52 | |
| Turnout | | | 47.1% | |
| Conservative gain from Labour | | Swing | 27% | |

=== 2018-2022 ===
Bar Pool By-Election 25 November 2021
| Party | Candidate | Votes | % | ±% |
|---|---|---|---|---|
| Conservative | Jamie Hartshorn | 508 | 55.3 | |
| Labour | Abi Olaifa | 215 | 23.4 | |
| Green | Andrew Heritage | 196 | 21.3 | |
| Majority | | 293 | 31.9 | |
| Turnout | | 919 | | |
| Conservative gain from Labour | | Swing | | |

=== 2026-2030 ===
Camp Hill By-Election 25 June 2026
| Party | Candidate | Votes | % | ±% |
|---|---|---|---|---|
| Reform | Peter Gilbert | 460 | 48.7 | |
| Labour | Eric Amaechi | 400 | 42.4 | |
| Conservative | Hari Khela | 84 | 8.9 | |
| Majority | | 60 | 6.4 | |
| Turnout | | 944 | | |
| Reform gain from Labour | | Swing | | |
