= 2024 Nuneaton and Bedworth Borough Council election =

Local election in England

← 2022	2 May 2024	2026 →

All 38 seats to Nuneaton and Bedworth Borough Council 20 seats needed for a majority

	First party	Second party	Third party
Leader	Chris Watkins	Kristofer Wilson	Michele Kondakor
Party	Labour	Conservative	Green
Seats before	5	27	2
Seats won	20	16	2
Seat change	▲15	▼11	Steady
Popular vote	22,388	21,906	3,837
Percentage	45.0%	44.1%	7.7%
Swing	▲10.3%	▼6.4%	▼6.3%
- Winner of each seat at the 2024 Nuneaton and Bedworth Borough Council election
Leader before election
Kristofer Wilson
Conservative
Leader after election
Chris Watkins
Labour

The 2024 Nuneaton and Bedworth Borough Council election was held on Thursday 2 May 2024, alongside the other local elections in the United Kingdom being held on the same day. All 38 members of Nuneaton and Bedworth Borough Council in Warwickshire were elected following boundary changes.

Labour gained overall control of the council from the Conservatives, winning just enough seats to have a majority. The Labour group leader, Chris Watkins, was formally appointed as leader of the council at the subsequent annual council meeting on 15 May 2024.

== Background ==
Nuneaton and Bedworth was a traditionally Labour council. From its creation up to 2008, the party held a majority on the council. The Conservatives took control in 2008, but the council fell into no overall control in 2010, and was retaken by Labour in 2012.

Labour controlled the council until 2018, when it again fell into no overall control. The Conservatives gained the council in 2021, and retained control in 2022. In that election, the Conservatives gained 1 seat with 50.5% of the vote, Labour lost 2 with 34.7%, and the Green Party gained 1 with 14.0%.

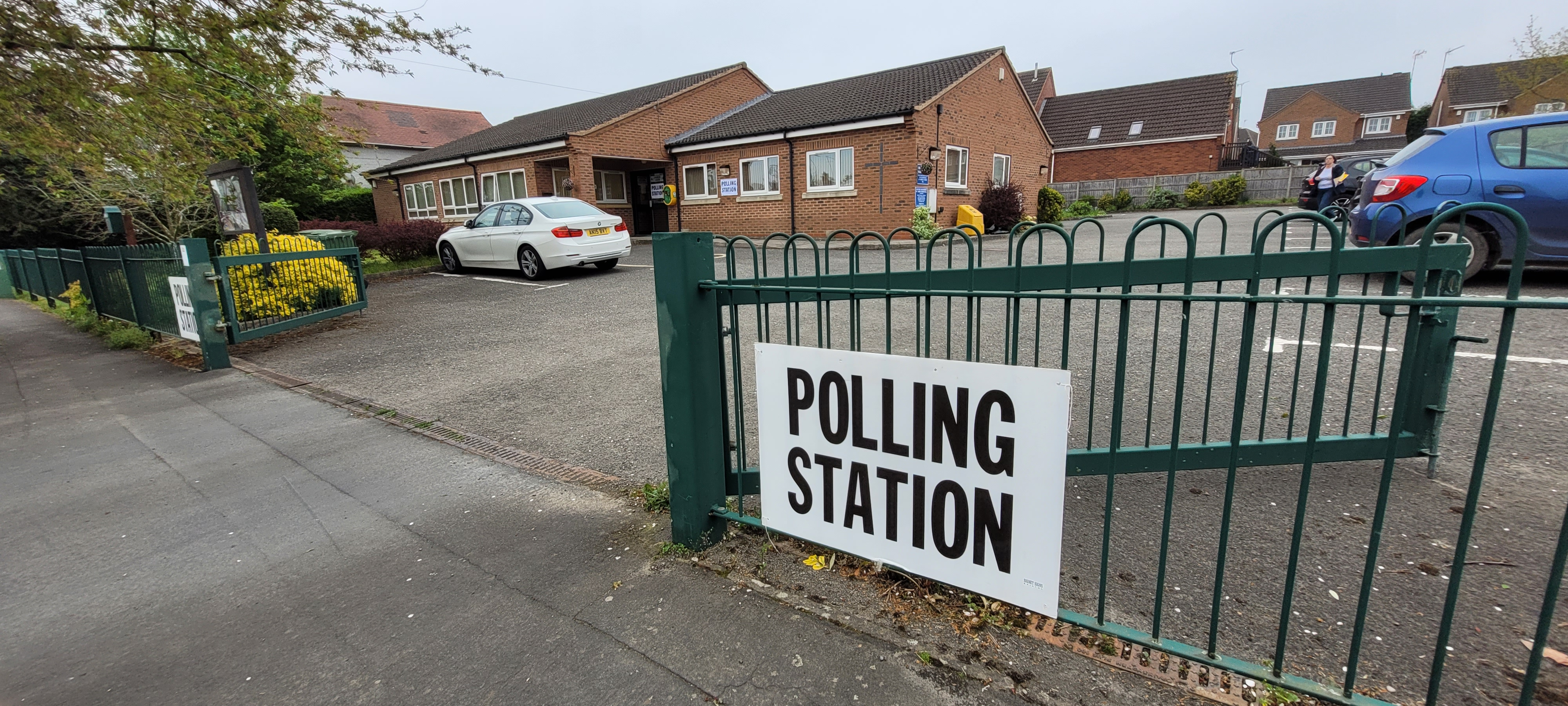
A church hall being used as a polling station in Weddington.

== Boundary changes ==
Nuneaton and Bedworth usually elects its councillors in halves, on a 4-year cycle. However, following boundary changes, all councillors will be elected to the new wards. All wards have 2 councillors. The change increases the number of councillors by 4.

Old wards	New wards
Abbey	Arbury
Arbury	Attleborough
Attleborough	Bede
Bar Pool	Bulkington
Bede	Camp Hill
Bulkington	Chilvers Coton
Camp Hill	Eastboro
Exhall	Exhall
Galley Common	Galley Common
Heath	Heath
Kingswood	Milby
Poplar	Poplar
Slough	Slough
St Nicolas	St Mary's
Weddington	St Nicolas
Wem Brook	Stockingford East
Whitestone	Stockingford West
	Weddington
	Whitestone

== Previous council composition ==
After 2022 election		Before 2024 election		After 2024 election	
Party	Seats	Party	Seats	Party	Seats
Conservative	27	Conservative	27	Conservative	16
Labour	5	Labour	5	Labour	20
Green	2	Green	2	Green	2

== Results ==
2024 Nuneaton and Bedworth Borough Council election
Party	Candidates	Seats	Gains	Losses	Net gain/loss	Seats %	Votes %	Votes	+/−
Labour	38	20	11	0	▲15	52.6	45.0	22,388	+10.3
Conservative	38	16	0	11	▼11	42.1	44.1	21,906	–6.4
Green	10	2	0	0	Steady	5.3	7.7	3,837	–6.3
TUSC	7	0	0	0	Steady	0.0	1.6	816	+1.1
Independent	2	0	0	0	Steady	0.0	1.2	613	N/A
Coventry Citizens	2	0	0	0	Steady	0.0	0.2	110	–0.1
Liberal Democrats	1	0	0	0	Steady	0.0	0.1	42	N/A

== Ward results ==
An asterisk denotes an incumbent councillor seeking re-election.

=== Arbury ===
Arbury
Party	Candidate	Votes	%	±%
Labour	Brady Hughes (Note: Elected for four years.)	695	50.55	
Labour	Christian Smith (Note: Elected for two years.)	656	47.71	
Conservative	Clare Golby*	651	47.35	
Conservative	Michael Green*	602	43.78	
TUSC	Eve Miller	146	10.62	
Turnout			26.87	
Labour gain from Conservative				
Labour gain from Conservative				

=== Attleborough ===
Attleborough
Party	Candidate	Votes	%	±%
Labour	Caroline Phillips	644	52.49	
Labour	Stephen Hey	624	50.86	
Conservative	Richard Baxter-Payne*	529	43.11	
Conservative	Kamaljeet Thiara	457	37.25	
Independent	Khalil Ahmed	200	16.3	
Turnout			25.25	
Labour gain from Conservative				
Labour gain from Conservative				

=== Bede ===
Bede
Party	Candidate	Votes	%	±%
Labour	William Hancox	799	62.4	
Labour	Anne-Marie Bull	796	62.16	
Conservative	Hayley Downs	490	38.27	
Conservative	Peter Gilbert	476	37.17	
Turnout			24.30	
Labour gain from Conservative				
Labour gain from Conservative				

=== Bulkington ===
Bulkington
Party	Candidate	Votes	%	±%
Conservative	Ljubisa Cvetkovic*	980	68.94	
Conservative	Richard Smith*	814	57.26	
Labour	John Beaumont	601	42.28	
Labour	Campbell McKee	448	31.52	
Turnout			31.59	
Conservative hold				
Conservative hold				

=== Camp Hill ===
Camp Hill
Party	Candidate	Votes	%	±%
Labour	Sharon Dhillon	575	62.03	
Labour	Eric Amaechi	523	56.42	
Conservative	Colin Cape*	346	37.32	
Conservative	Romaine Tabet	293	31.61	
TUSC	Paul Reilly	117	12.62	
Turnout			19.06	
Labour hold				
Labour gain from Conservative				

=== Chilvers Coton ===
Chilvers Coton
Party	Candidate	Votes	%	±%
Labour	Tracy Sheppard*	680	62.1	
Labour	Tony Venson	564	51.51	
Green	David Fletcher	299	27.31	
Conservative	Scott Harbison*	222	20.27	
Conservative	Sebastian Gran	220	20.09	
TUSC	Bernadette Quinn	205	18.72	
Turnout			24.74	
Labour win (new seat)				
Labour win (new seat)				

=== Eastboro ===
Eastboro
Party	Candidate	Votes	%	±%
Conservative	Tony Cooper*	591	56.61	
Conservative	Mark Etienne	475	45.5	
Labour	Brian Walmsley	408	39.08	
Labour	Sunday Ajayi	383	36.69	
Green	Spring Vernon	231	22.13	
Turnout			29.19	
Conservative win (new seat)				
Conservative win (new seat)				

=== Exhall ===
Exhall
Party	Candidate	Votes	%	±%
Conservative	Damon Brown*	717	51.27	
Labour	Tim Jenkins	628	44.91	
Labour	Helen Sinclair	598	42.76	
Conservative	Sandra Walsh	526	37.61	
Green	Merle Gering	152	10.87	
TUSC	Eileen Hunter	66	4.72	
Coventry Citizens	Andrew Frampton	59	4.22	
Coventry Citizens	Megan Frampton	51	3.65	
Turnout			28.80	
Conservative hold				
Labour gain from Conservative				

=== Galley Common ===
Galley Common
Party	Candidate	Votes	%	±%
Labour	Paul Hickling	722	56.74	
Conservative	Samuel Croft*	654	51.39	
Labour	Alex Ratcliffe	621	48.8	
Conservative	Pauly Palamattom	548	43.06	
Turnout			23.86	
Labour gain from Conservative				
Conservative hold				

=== Heath ===
Heath
Party	Candidate	Votes	%	±%
Labour	Will Markham	788	58.67	
Labour	Rob Roze	661	49.22	
Conservative	Jasbir Singh*	647	48.18	
Conservative	Lee Downs*	590	43.93	
Turnout			25.53	
Labour gain from Conservative				
Labour gain from Conservative				

=== Milby ===
Milby
Party	Candidate	Votes	%	±%
Conservative	Michael Bird	524	59.34	
Conservative	Jonathan Collett	462	52.32	
Labour	Lindsey Brookes	289	32.73	
Green	Tess Brookes	277	31.37	
Labour	Michael Fowler	214	24.24	
Turnout			32.6	
Conservative win (new seat)				
Conservative win (new seat)				

=== Poplar ===
Poplar
Party	Candidate	Votes	%	±%
Conservative	Bhagwant Pandher*	674	49.18	
Conservative	Amarjit Khangura	619	45.17	
Labour	Luke Charles	576	42.03	
Labour	Bob Copland	563	41.08	
Green	Krissi Cope	162	11.82	
Green	Richard Cope	147	10.73	
Turnout			28.62	
Conservative hold				
Conservative hold				

=== Slough ===
Slough
Party	Candidate	Votes	%	±%
Conservative	Sue Markham*	750	46.67	
Conservative	Martin Walsh*	690	42.94	
Labour	Mark Garratt	674	41.94	
Labour	Paul Waldron	596	37.09	
Independent	Sam Margrave	413	25.7	
TUSC	Mark Burdett	91	5.66	
Turnout			30.18	
Conservative hold				
Conservative hold				

=== St Mary's ===
St Mary's
Party	Candidate	Votes	%	±%
Labour	Bhim Saru	809	71.75	
Labour	Jill Sheppard*	797	70.69	
Conservative	Craig Aston	355	31.49	
Conservative	Peter Aucott	294	26.08	
Turnout			21.96	
Labour win (new seat)				
Labour win (new seat)				

=== St Nicolas ===
St Nicolas
Party	Candidate	Votes	%	±%
Conservative	Jeffrey Clarke	1,002	61.6	
Conservative	Jamie Hartshorn*	842	51.77	
Labour	Joshua McDonagh	475	29.2	
Labour	Matthew Smith	434	26.68	
Green	Andrew Heritage	429	26.38	
TUSC	Danny Webb	71	4.37	
Turnout			37.40	
Conservative hold				
Conservative hold				

=== Stockingford East ===
Stockingford East
Party	Candidate	Votes	%	±%
Labour	Jack Bonner	736	61.49	
Labour	Nicky King	713	59.57	
Conservative	Christopher Collins	510	42.61	
Conservative	Sue Underhill	435	36.34	
Turnout			24.97	
Labour win (new seat)				
Labour win (new seat)				

=== Stockingford West ===
Stockingford West
Party	Candidate	Votes	%	±%
Labour	Chris Watkins*	747	60.24	
Labour	Kath Price	742	59.84	
Conservative	Ewan Evans	445	35.89	
Conservative	Jack Kennaugh*	426	34.35	
TUSC	Catherine Mosey	120	9.68	
Turnout			22.23	
Labour win (new seat)				
Labour win (new seat)				

=== Weddington ===
Weddington
Party	Candidate	Votes	%	±%
Green	Michele Kondakor	1,037	65.78	
Green	Mike Wright*	847	53.73	
Conservative	Graham Curtis	363	23.03	
Conservative	Lilian Pilkington	344	21.82	
Labour	Sutish Badhan	261	16.56	
Labour	Collette Watkins	259	16.43	
Liberal Democrats	Joy Salaja	42	2.66	
Turnout			32.63	
Green hold				
Green hold				

=== Whitestone ===
Whitestone
Party	Candidate	Votes	%	±%
Conservative	Kristofer Wilson*	1,173	63.61	
Conservative	Julian Gutteridge*	1,170	63.45	
Labour	Jamie Blakemore	568	30.8	
Labour	Dianne Fowler	521	28.25	
Green	Sophie Bonner	256	13.88	
Turnout			37.44	
Conservative hold				
Conservative hold				
