= 2021 Nuneaton and Bedworth Borough Council election =

2021 UK local government election

← 2018	6 May 2021	2022 →

17 of 34 seats on Nuneaton and Bedworth Borough Council 18 seats needed for a majority
	First party	Second party	Third party
Leader	Kris Wilson	Julie Jackson	Keith Kondakor
Party	Conservative	Labour	Green
Leader's seat	Whitestone (Note: Wilson's seat was not up for election in this cycle.)	Wem Brook (defeated)	Weddington
Last election	5	11	1
Seats won	15	1	1
Seat change	▲10	▼10	Steady
Popular vote	19,380	8,749	4,467
Percentage	58.2%	26.3%	13.4%
Swing	▲25.5 pp	▼14.0 pp	▲2.4 pp
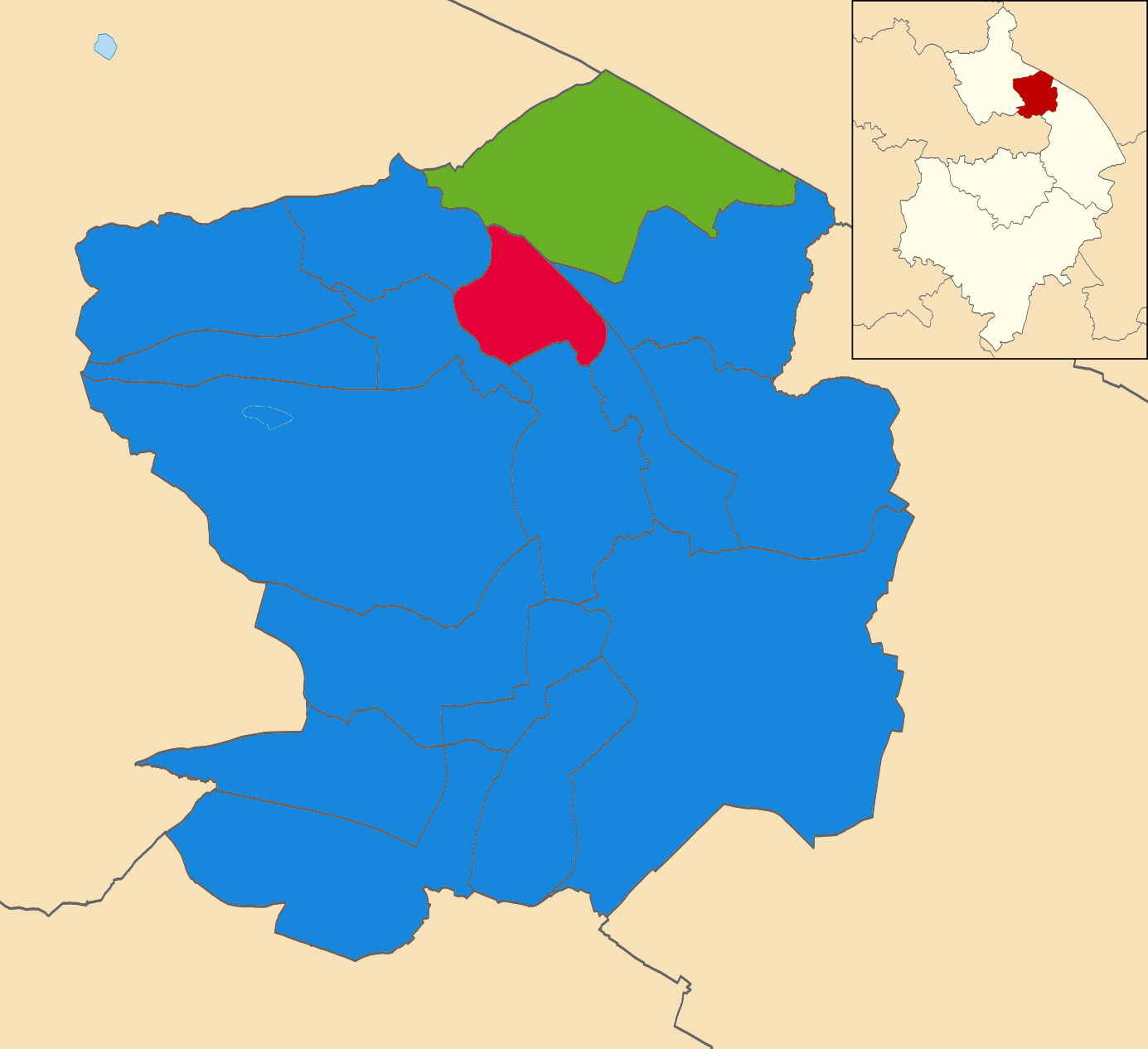
- Map showing the results of the 2021 NBBC election
Council control before election
No overall control
Council control after election
Conservative Party

The 2021 Nuneaton and Bedworth Borough Council election was held on 6 May 2021 as part of the 2021 United Kingdom local elections and alongside elections for Warwickshire County Council and Warwickshire Police and Crime Commissioner. Half of the borough council seats were up for election and the results provided the Conservative Party with a majority on the council, with the party winning all but two seats up for election.

== Background ==
Nuneaton and Bedworth operates a divided election cycle. Each ward is represented by two councillors who each serve staggered four year terms. The result is that seventeen members of the borough council are elected every two years. The seats contested in this election were originally scheduled to be facing election in 2020 but these elections were postponed (alongside all local and national elections in the UK) due to the COVID-19 pandemic.

At the 2018 Nuneaton and Bedworth Borough Council election, the Conservative Party gained nine seats, including eight from the Labour Party. As a result, Labour lost control of the council and it had no overall control going into the election. Prior to the election, the Conservative Party had not won a majority on the borough council since the 2008 election.

== Results ==
Half of the council's 34 seats were contested in the election. At the last election, the Labour Party won twelve of these seats, the Conservative Party won four and the Green Party won one. Conservative candidates won a total of eleven seats from Labour incumbents, providing them with overall control of the Nuneaton and Bedworth Borough Council. Labour held only the Abbey ward while the Green incumbent retained his seat in Weddington.

2021 Nuneaton and Bedworth Borough Council election
Party	This election			Full council			This election		
Party	Seats	Net	Seats %	Other	Total	Total %	Votes	Votes %	+/−
Conservative	15	▲10	88.2	9	24	70.6	19,380	58.2	+25.5
Labour	1	▼10	5.9	6	7	20.6	8,749	26.3	-14.0
Green	1	Steady	5.9	0	1	2.9	4,467	13.4	+2.4
TUSC	0	Steady	0.0	0	0	0.0	193	0.6	New
Reform UK	0	Steady	0.0	0	0	0.0	34	0.1	New
Independent	0	Steady	0.0	2	2	5.9	457	1.4	+1.0

=== Council composition ===
As a result of winning eleven seats, the Conservative Party secured a majority on the borough council. Prior to the election, Nuneaton and Bedworth had a Labour-led administration despite no single party having overall control of the council.

After 2018 election		Before 2021 election		After 2021 election	
Party	Seats	Party	Seats	Party	Seats
Labour	17	Labour	17	Conservative	24
Conservative	16	Conservative	13	Labour	7
Green	1	Independent (Note: Elected as Conservatives but sitting as Nuneaton Community Independents.)	3	Independent	2
		Green	1	Green	1

=== Party reaction ===
Local members of the Conservative Party celebrated the result. Marcus Jones, the Conservative MP for Nuneaton, described being 'absolutely ecstatic' over 'a brilliant night with fantastic results'. Kris Wilson, who became the Conservative leader of the borough council after the election, positioned the results in the broader political context of Conservative gains in traditional Labour-voting areas. Referencing the 'red wall', he said 'I think we have seen that red wall crumble here in Nuneaton and Bedworth too, people want change, people have been out and voted for it'. After losing her seat in the Wem Brook ward, Labour council leader Julie Jackson pledged that the party would respond: 'we will fight and we will be back out there listening hard to the good people of Nuneaton and Bedworth'.

== Ward results ==
Changes shown compared to the 2016 Nuneaton and Bedworth Borough Council election, when these seats were last contested. Swing figures are calculated between the winning candidate and the candidate in second place. Turnout figures do not include spoiled ballots.

=== Abbey ===
2021 Nuneaton and Bedworth Council election: Abbey
Party	Candidate	Votes	%	±%
Labour	Jill Sheppard	886	48.0	▼7.1
Conservative	Louisa DiGirolamo	680	36.9	▲19.2
Green	Sophie Bonner	278	15.1	▲7.7
Majority		206	11.1	
Turnout		1,844		
Labour hold		Swing	▼13.1	

=== Arbury ===
2021 Nuneaton and Bedworth Council election: Arbury
Party	Candidate	Votes	%	±%
Conservative	Clare Golby	1,212	67.4	▲24.1
Labour Co-op	Joe Bevan	463	25.7	▼10.0
Green	Margaret Morrissey	98	5.4	▼0.2
Independent	Katrina Slomczynski	26	1.4	▲1.4
Majority		749	41.7	
Turnout		1,799		
Conservative hold		Swing	▲17.0	

=== Attleborough ===
2021 Nuneaton and Bedworth Council election: Attleborough
Party	Candidate	Votes	%	±%
Conservative	Richard Baxter-Payne	980	51.5	▲13.3
Labour	June Tandy	401	21.1	▼17.7
Independent	Kieran Brown	377	19.8	▲19.8
Green	Laurel Brindley	110	5.8	Steady
Reform UK	Robin Howard	34	1.8	▲1.8
Majority		579	30.4	
Turnout		1,902		
Conservative gain from Labour		Swing	▲15.5	

=== Barpool ===
2021 Nuneaton and Bedworth Council election: Barpool
Party	Candidate	Votes	%	±%
Conservative	Jack Kennaugh	917	55.8	▲25.9
Labour Co-op	Paul Edwards	538	32.7	▼14.5
Green	Theresa Brookes	135	8.2	▲3.0
Independent	Alan Baxter	54	3.3	▲3.3
Majority		379	23.1	
Turnout		1,644		
Conservative gain from Labour		Swing	▲20.2	

=== Bede ===
2021 Nuneaton and Bedworth Council election: Bede
Party	Candidate	Votes	%	±%
Conservative	Brian Hammersley	982	61.3	▲40.9
Labour	Bill Hancox	621	38.7	▼17.8
Majority		361	22.6	N/A
Turnout		1,603		
Conservative gain from Labour		Swing	▲29.3	

=== Bulkington ===
2021 Nuneaton and Bedworth Council election: Bulkington
Party	Candidate	Votes	%	±%
Conservative	Ljubisa Cvetkovic	1,727	80.1	▲43.4
Labour	Alan Lewis	428	19.9	▼21.0
Majority		1299	60.2	N/A
Turnout		2,155		
Conservative gain from Labour		Swing	▲32.2	

=== Camp Hill ===
2021 Nuneaton and Bedworth Council election: Camp Hill
Party	Candidate	Votes	%	±%
Conservative	Anthony Cooper	737	53.4	▲35.7
Labour	Ian Lloyd	449	32.6	▼16.1
Green	Laura Hulme	151	10.9	▲5.6
TUSC	Paul Reilly	42	3.0	0.0
Majority		288	20.8	N/A
Turnout		1,379		
Conservative gain from Labour		Swing	▲25.9	

=== Exhall ===
In 2016, the Exhall ward elected two councillors in the same election. For this reason, directly comparing results is not possible.

2021 Nuneaton and Bedworth Council election: Exhall
Party	Candidate	Votes	%	±%
Conservative	Lee Downs	1,183	59.7	
Labour	Helen Sinclair	606	30.6	
Green	Merle Gering	128	6.5	
TUSC	Margaret Hunter	65	3.3	
Majority		577	29.1	
Turnout		1,982		
Conservative gain from Labour		Swing		

=== Galley Common ===
Daniel Gissane was elected as a Conservative candidate in Galley Common in the 2016 Nuneaton and Bedworth Council election but left the party to sit as an independent alongside the Nuneaton Community Independents. He did not stand for re-election.

2021 Nuneaton and Bedworth Council election: Galley Common
Party	Candidate	Votes	%	±%
Conservative	Mandy Tromans	1,118	62.8	▲26.1
Labour	Eric Amaechi	511	28.7	▼5.4
Green	Spring Vernon	151	8.5	▲3.8
Majority		607	34.1	
Turnout		1,780		
Conservative hold		Swing	▲15.8	

=== Heath ===
2021 Nuneaton and Bedworth Council election: Heath
Party	Candidate	Votes	%	±%
Conservative	Jasbir Singh	1,232	65.8	▲31.3
Labour	Robert Copland	639	34.2	▼18.0
Majority		593	31.6	N/A
Turnout		1,871		
Conservative gain from Labour		Swing	▲24.7	

=== Kingswood ===
2021 Nuneaton and Bedworth Council election: Kingswood
Party	Candidate	Votes	%	±%
Conservative	Brett Beetham	793	55.3	▲33.4
Labour	Kathleen Price	530	36.9	▼12.3
Green	Max Wilson	80	4.7	▲0.9
TUSC	Catherine Mosey	32	2.2	▲0.6
Majority		263	18.4	N/A
Turnout		1,435		
Conservative gain from Labour		Swing	▲22.9	

=== Poplar ===
2021 Nuneaton and Bedworth Council election: Poplar
Party	Candidate	Votes	%	±%
Conservative	Susan Markham	1,052	59.0	▲31.3
Labour	Danny Aldington	605	33.9	▼38.4
Green	Alice Twyman	126	7.1	▲7.1
Majority		447	25.1	N/A
Turnout		1,783		
Conservative gain from Labour		Swing	▲34.8	

=== Slough ===
2021 Nuneaton and Bedworth Council election: Slough
Party	Candidate	Votes	%	±%
Conservative	Martin Walsh	1,188	67.7	▲25.0
Labour	John Swift	422	24.0	▼7.0
Green	Ian Morrissey	92	5.2	▲5.2
TUSC	Maximilian McGee	54	3.1	▲3.1
Majority		766	43.7	
Turnout		1,756		
Conservative hold		Swing	▲16.0	

=== St. Nicolas ===
2021 Nuneaton and Bedworth Council election: St. Nicolas
Party	Candidate	Votes	%	±%
Conservative	Jeffrey Clarke	1,536	52.3	▲4.2
Green	Michele Kondakor	1,113	37.9	▲0.8
Labour	Abiola Olaifa	287	9.8	▼5.0
Majority		423	14.4	
Turnout		2,936		
Conservative hold		Swing	▲1.7	

=== Weddington ===
2021 Nuneaton and Bedworth Council election: Weddington
Party	Candidate	Votes	%	±%
Green	Keith Kondakor	1,520	49.7	▼5.7
Conservative	Kamaljeet Thiara	1,223	40.0	▲8.8
Labour	Brian Walmsley	314	10.3	▼3.1
Majority		297	9.7	
Turnout		3,057		
Green hold		Swing	▼7.2	

=== Wem Brook ===
Due to the extremely close nature of the result, the Wem Brook ward ballots were subject to two re-counts.

2021 Nuneaton and Bedworth Council election: Wem Brook
Party	Candidate	Votes	%	±%
Conservative	Scott Harbison	703	44.8	▲18.7
Labour	Julie Jackson	699	44.6	▼18.2
Green	Jeremey Millen	167	10.6	▲4.7
Majority		4	0.2	
Turnout		1,402		
Conservative gain from Labour		Swing	▲23.5	

=== Whitestone ===
2021 Nuneaton and Bedworth Council election: Whitestone
Party	Candidate	Votes	%	±%
Conservative	Julian Gutteridge	2,117	85.8	▲27.2
Labour	Jack Bonner	350	14.2	▼4.5
Green	Michael Wright	318	12.9	▲7.7
Majority		1767	71.6	
Turnout		2,467		
Conservative hold		Swing	▲15.9	

== By-elections ==
=== Bar Pool ===
Bar Pool: 25 November 2021
Party	Candidate	Votes	%	±%
Conservative	Jamie Hartshorn	508	55.3	−0.5
Labour	Abi Olaifa	215	23.4	−9.3
Green	Andrew Heritage	196	21.3	+13.1
Majority		293	31.9	
Turnout				
Conservative gain from Labour		Swing	▲4.4	

== See also ==
- 2021 Warwickshire County Council election, local election held on the same day in Nuneaton and Bedworth
- 2021 Warwickshire Police and Crime Commissioner election, local election held on the same day in Nuneaton and Bedworth
