= 2002 Nuneaton and Bedworth Borough Council election =

2002 UK local government election

Map of the results

Elections to Nuneaton and Bedworth Borough Council were held on 2 May 2002. The whole council was up for election following boundary changes, and the Labour Party retained control of the council.

After the election, the composition of the council was

- Labour 26
- Conservative 8

== Election result ==
Nuneaton and Bedworth Council Election 2002
Party	Seats	Gains	Losses	Net gain/loss	Seats %	Votes %	Votes	+/−
Labour	26	26	0	+26		53.9	26,010	
Conservative	8	8	0	+8		42.0	20,264	
Liberal Democrats	0	0	0	0		2.5	1,216	
Liberal	0	0	0	0		1.0	500	
Independent	0	0	0	0		0.5	229	

The breakdown of councillor terms as a result of the election is shown below. The seats of the councillors with two year terms were contested in the 2004 council election.

Affiliation	Term Length	
Affiliation	2 Years	4 Years
Labour Party	13	13
Conservative Party	4	4

== Ward results ==
Nuneaton and Bedworth Borough Council Elections 2002: Abbey Ward
Party	Candidate	Votes	%	±%
Labour	Patricia Harris	910		
Labour	Annette McMaster	894		
Conservative	Patricia Grant	400		
Conservative	Faye McLeod	390		
Independent	Razwan Amin	229		
Majority				
Turnout				

Nuneaton and Bedworth Borough Council Elections 2002: Arbury Ward
Party	Candidate	Votes	%	±%
Labour	Robert Hicks	573		
Labour	John Preedy	546		
Conservative	David Bryden	434		
Conservative	Alan Farnell	433		
Majority				
Turnout				

Nuneaton and Bedworth Borough Council Elections 2002: Attleborough Ward
Party	Candidate	Votes	%	±%
Labour	Adrian James	770		
Labour	Colin Richards	742		
Conservative	Clive Stringer	681		
Conservative	Martin Heatley	676		
Majority				
Turnout				

Nuneaton and Bedworth Borough Council Elections 2002: Barpool Ward
Party	Candidate	Votes	%	±%
Labour	Francis McGale	620		
Labour	Kieron Murphy	570		
Conservative	John Quartermain	380		
Liberal	Frank Smith	273		
Liberal	Frank Mills	227		
Majority				
Turnout				

Nuneaton and Bedworth Borough Council Elections 2002: Bede Ward
Party	Candidate	Votes	%	±%
Labour	Peter Bradley	914		
Labour	Richard Grant	885		
Conservative	Barry Lobbett	475		
Conservative	Steven O’Neill	424		
Majority				
Turnout				

Nuneaton and Bedworth Borough Council Elections 2002: Bulkington Ward
Party	Candidate	Votes	%	±%
Conservative	Desmond O’Brien	1,192		
Conservative	John Ross	1,119		
Labour	Gerald Hancock	886		
Labour	David Ensor	810		
Majority				
Turnout				

Nuneaton and Bedworth Borough Council Elections 2002: Camp Hill Ward
Party	Candidate	Votes	%	±%
Labour	Dennis Harvey	704		
Labour	Michael McMahon	584		
Conservative	Stanley Snow	420		
Majority				
Turnout				

Nuneaton and Bedworth Borough Council Elections 2002: Exhall Ward
Party	Candidate	Votes	%	±%
Labour	Sheila Hancox	1,086		
Labour	Don Navarro	976		
Conservative	Reg Lovick	575		
Conservative	Margaret O’Neill	524		
Majority				
Turnout				

Nuneaton and Bedworth Borough Council Elections 2002: Galley Common Ward
Party	Candidate	Votes	%	±%
Labour	Robin Hood	718		
Labour	Maurice Kedwards	694		
Conservative	Bryan Grant	471		
Conservative	Mark Grant	457		
Majority				
Turnout				

Nuneaton and Bedworth Borough Council Elections 2002: Heath Ward
Party	Candidate	Votes	%	±%
Labour	John Glass	757		
Labour	Ian Lloyd	753		
Conservative	Stephen Ward	371		
Conservative	Ian Llewellyn-Nash	358		
Liberal Democrats	Paul Behan	306		
Liberal Democrats	Peter Lee	229		
Majority				
Turnout				

Nuneaton and Bedworth Borough Council Elections 2002: Kingswood Ward
Party	Candidate	Votes	%	±%
Labour	Geoff Ashford	683		
Labour	Patricia Henry	633		
Conservative	Sonja Wilson	428		
Majority				
Turnout				

Nuneaton and Bedworth Borough Council Elections 2002: Poplar Ward
Party	Candidate	Votes	%	±%
Labour	Robert Copland	751		
Labour	William Hancox	744		
Conservative	Ann Crutchlow	361		
Majority				
Turnout				

Nuneaton and Bedworth Borough Council Elections 2002: Slough Ward
Party	Candidate	Votes	%	±%
Labour	Anthony Lloyd	911		
Labour	Roma Taylor	887		
Conservative	Jim O'Brien	672		
Conservative	Alan Robinson	589		
Majority				
Turnout				

Nuneaton and Bedworth Borough Council Elections 2002: St. Nicolas Ward
Party	Candidate	Votes	%	±%
Conservative	Harry Cawthorne	1,272		
Conservative	Thomas Wilson	1,178		
Labour	Jane Howard	697		
Labour	James Hannan	602		
Majority				
Turnout				

Nuneaton and Bedworth Borough Council Elections 2002: Weddington Ward
Party	Candidate	Votes	%	±%
Conservative	Gerald Smith	1,276		
Conservative	Jeffrey Clarke	1,206		
Labour	Walter Summer	876		
Labour	Sandra Bradley	757		
Majority				
Turnout				

Nuneaton and Bedworth Borough Council Elections 2002: Wembrook Ward
Party	Candidate	Votes	%	±%
Labour	William Sheppard	960		
Labour	Julie Jackson	934		
Conservative	Marcus Jones	444		
Conservative	John Waine	424		
Majority				
Turnout				

Nuneaton and Bedworth Borough Council Elections 2002: Whitestone Ward
Party	Candidate	Votes	%	±%
Conservative	Neil Colledge	1,344		
Conservative	Nicholas Grant	1,261		
Liberal Democrats	Sarah Hall	681		
Labour	Philip Johnson	645		
Labour	Daniel De’Ath	538		
Majority				
Turnout				
