= 2022 Nuneaton and Bedworth Borough Council election =

2022 UK local government election

← 2021	5 May 2022	2024 →

17 of 34 seats on Nuneaton and Bedworth Borough Council 18 seats needed for a majority
	First party	Second party	Third party
Leader	Kris Wilson	Chris Watkins	Keith Kondakor
Party	Conservative	Labour	Green
Leader's seat	Whitestone	Kingswood	Weddington (Note: Kondakor's seat was not up for election in this cycle.)
Last election	11	6	0
Seats won	12	4	1
Seat change	▲1	▼2	▲1
Popular vote	14,811	10,165	4,101
Percentage	50.5%	34.7%	14.0%
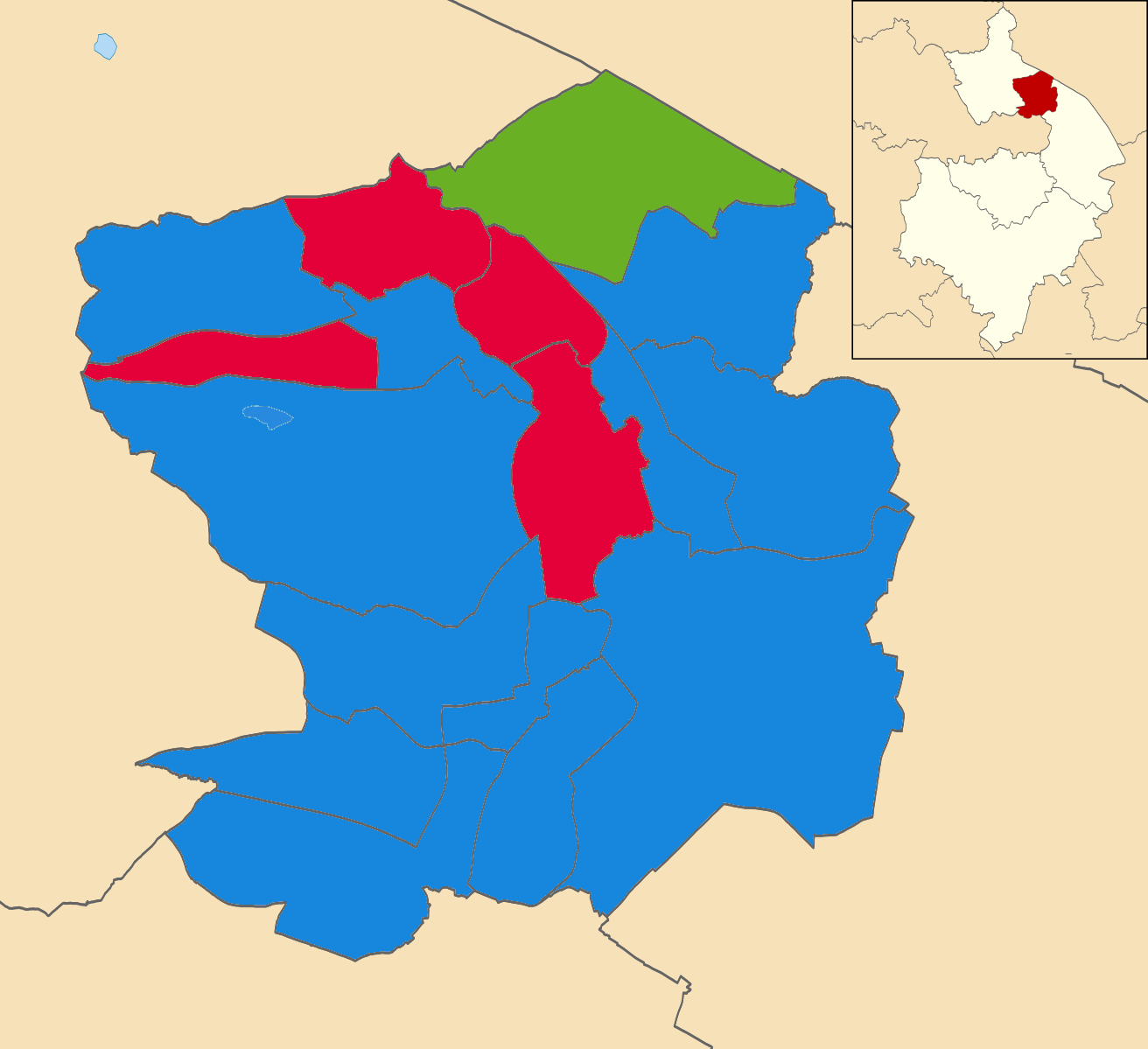
- Map showing the results of the 2022 NBBC election
Council control before election
Conservative Party
Council control after election
Conservative Party

The 2022 Nuneaton and Bedworth Borough Council election was held on 5 May 2022 to elect members of Nuneaton and Bedworth Borough Council. Seventeen seats of the thirty-four seats on the council were elected, as part of the wider 2022 local elections.

The Conservative Party won twelve of the contested seats. As a result, they retained overall control of the council for the first time in the history of the borough. The Labour Party won four seats and the Green Party won one.

== Background ==
Nuneaton and Bedworth operates a divided election cycle. Each ward is represented by two councillors who each serve staggered four year terms. The result is that seventeen members of the borough council are elected every two years. The seats up for election in 2022 were last elected in 2018. In that election, the Conservatives won eleven seats while Labour won six.

Labour had previously controlled the council for a thirty-five year period between 1973 and 2008. In 2008, the Conservative Party won control of the council before it reverted to no overall control in 2010. Labour regained control of the council for a six-year period between 2012 and 2018. Then it again returned to no overall control. At the 2021 Nuneaton and Bedworth Borough Council election, the Conservative Party gained ten seats, all from the Labour Party. As a result, the Conservatives gained control of the council for the first time since 2010.

Since the previous election in 2018, two councillors elected as Conservatives had resigned from the party to sit under the label "Nuneaton Community Independents". Neither of the councillors sought re-election in 2022. In October 2021, Patricia Elliott resigned as Labour councillor for the Barpool ward. The subsequent by-election was won by Conservative candidate Jamie Hartshorn.

The election count was conducted at the Nuneaton campus of North Warwickshire and South Leicestershire College.

== Results summary ==
Three seats changed hands in the election. Green candidate Michael Wright won the Weddington ward from the Conservatives. Meanwhile the Conservatives won two seats from Labour including the Barpool seat where they had won a by-election during the previous term. As a result, the Conservatives retained overall control of the council.

2022 Nuneaton and Bedworth Borough Council election
Party	This election			Full council			This election		
Party	Seats	Net	Seats %	Other	Total	Total %	Votes	Votes %	+/−
Conservative	12	▲1	70.6	15	27	79.4	14,811	50.5	▼0.5
Labour	4	▼2	23.5	1	5	14.7	10,165	34.7	▼1.2
Green	1	▲1	5.9	1	2	5.9	4,101	14.0	▲5.0
TUSC	0	Steady	0.0	0	0	0.0	142	0.5	Steady
Coventry Citizens Party	0	Steady	0.0	0	0	0.0	100	0.3	▲0.3

=== Council composition ===
After 2021 election		Before 2022 election		After 2022 election	
Party	Seats	Party	Seats	Party	Seats
Conservative	24	Conservative	25	Conservative	27
Labour	7	Labour	6	Labour	5
Independent (Note: Elected as Conservatives but sitting as Nuneaton Community Independents.)	2	Independent	2	Green	2
Green	1	Green	1		

=== Party reaction ===
In the wake of the results, the Conservative leader of the council Kris Wilson suggested that the Conservatives were 'building the foundations of a new blue base here in Nuneaton and Bedworth'. In reference to the party's improved performances in traditional Labour areas such as Camp Hill and Wem Brook, he said they were 'seats that Labour took for granted'.

== Ward results ==
Changes shown compared to the 2018 Nuneaton and Bedworth Borough Council election, when these seats were last contested. Swing figures are calculated between the winning candidate and the candidate in second place. Turnout figures include invalid ballots, therefore they may differ from total votes cast for all candidates.

=== Abbey ===
2022 Nuneaton and Bedworth Council election: Abbey
Party	Candidate	Votes	%	±%
Labour	Neil Phillips	1,011	60.5	▲5.3
Conservative	Mo Sahib	460	27.5	▲6.2
Green	Alice Twyman	200	12.0	▲4.1
Majority		551	33.0	
Turnout		1,679	27.0	▼2.3
Labour hold		Swing	▼0.4	

=== Arbury ===
2022 Nuneaton and Bedworth Council election: Arbury
Party	Candidate	Votes	%	±%
Conservative	Michael Green	825	56.7	▲1.4
Labour	Joe Bevan	497	34.2	▼1.7
Green	Tess Brookes	133	9.1	▲3.0
Majority		328	22.5	
Turnout		1,462	27.5	▼3.1
Conservative hold		Swing	▲1.6	

=== Attleborough ===
2022 Nuneaton and Bedworth Council election: Attleborough
Party	Candidate	Votes	%	±%
Conservative	Colin Cape	807	52.1	▼3.9
Labour	Stephen Hey	530	34.2	▼1.3
Green	Laurel Brindley	212	13.7	▲5.2
Majority		277	17.9	
Turnout		1,558	27.5	▼3.2
Conservative hold		Swing	▼1.3	

=== Barpool ===
2022 Nuneaton and Bedworth Council election: Barpool
Party	Candidate	Votes	%	±%
Conservative	Jamie Hartshorn	652	47.6	▲6.8
Labour	Bhim Saru	566	41.3	▼8.7
Green	Andrew Heritage	151	11.0	▲1.9
Majority		86	6.3	
Turnout		1,371	25.7	▼1.6
Conservative gain from Labour		Swing	▲7.8	

=== Bede ===
2022 Nuneaton and Bedworth Council election: Bede
Party	Candidate	Votes	%	±%
Conservative	Joy Moreton	763	48.6	▲4.4
Labour	William Hancox	691	44.0	▼2.1
Green	Kristine Cope	116	7.4	▲7.4
Majority		72	4.6	
Turnout		1,570	31.1	▲2.5
Conservative gain from Labour		Swing	▲3.2	

=== Bulkington ===
2022 Nuneaton and Bedworth Council election: Bulkington
Party	Candidate	Votes	%	±%
Conservative	Richard Smith	1,306	71.1	Steady
Labour	Brian Walmsley	532	28.9	Steady
Majority		774	42.1	
Turnout		1,856	36.5	▼1.6
Conservative hold		Swing	Steady	

=== Camp Hill ===
2022 Nuneaton and Bedworth Council election: Camp Hill
Party	Candidate	Votes	%	±%
Labour	Emma Shiers	628	47.1	▼0.1
Conservative	Ewan Evans	552	41.4	▲18.0
Green	Jeremy Millen	108	8.1	▲8.1
TUSC	Paul Reilly	45	3.4	▲3.4
Majority		76	5.7	
Turnout		1,338	20.7	▼0.7
Labour hold		Swing	▼9.0	

=== Exhall ===
2022 Nuneaton and Bedworth Council election: Exhall
Party	Candidate	Votes	%	±%
Conservative	Damon Brown	881	47.5	▼2.9
Labour	Helen Sinclair	702	37.8	▼1.4
Green	Merle Gering	141	7.6	▲4.4
Coventry Citizens	Dylan Frampton	100	5.4	▲5.4
TUSC	Margaret Hunter	32	1.7	▼0.3
Majority		179	9.6	
Turnout		1,864	29.6	▼3.7
Conservative hold		Swing	▼0.8	

=== Galley Common ===
2022 Nuneaton and Bedworth Council election: Galley Common
Party	Candidate	Votes	%	±%
Conservative	Samuel Croft	879	55.6	▼4.6
Labour	Paul Edwards	542	34.3	▼5.6
Green	David Fletcher	161	10.2	▲10.2
Majority		337	21.3	
Turnout		1,594	24.7	▼2.1
Conservative hold		Swing	▲0.5	

=== Heath ===
2022 Nuneaton and Bedworth Council election: Heath
Party	Candidate	Votes	%	±%
Conservative	Graham Moreton	795	51.6	▼3.5
Labour	Wilhelm Markham	600	39.0	▼5.9
Green	Jonathan Gadsby	145	9.4	▲9.4
Majority		195	12.7	
Turnout		1,551	27.0	▼5.7
Conservative hold		Swing	▲1.2	

=== Kingswood ===
2022 Nuneaton and Bedworth Council election: Kingswood
Party	Candidate	Votes	%	±%
Labour	Christopher Watkins	715	55.2	▲6.6
Conservative	Pappu Palamattom	580	44.8	▲2.8
Majority		135	10.4	
Turnout		1,304	25.5	▼1.6
Labour hold		Swing	▲1.9	

=== Poplar ===
2022 Nuneaton and Bedworth Council election: Poplar
Party	Candidate	Votes	%	±%
Conservative	Bhagwant Pandher	839	52.1	▲0.1
Labour	Robert Copland	614	38.1	▼9.9
Green	Richard Cope	157	9.8	▲9.8
Majority		225	14.0	
Turnout		1,621	28.2	▼1.3
Conservative hold		Swing	▲5.0	

=== Slough ===
2022 Nuneaton and Bedworth Council election: Slough
Party	Candidate	Votes	%	±%
Conservative	Kyle Evans	982	61.4	▼5.4
Labour	Jack Bonner	500	31.1	▼1.9
Green	Spring Vernon	79	4.9	▲4.9
TUSC	Maximilian McGee	39	2.4	▲2.4
Majority		482	30.1	
Turnout		1,604	30.0	▼3.8
Conservative hold		Swing	▼1.7	

=== St. Nicolas ===
2022 Nuneaton and Bedworth Council election: St. Nicolas
Party	Candidate	Votes	%	±%
Conservative	Robert Tromans	1,227	47.6	▼4.9
Green	Michele Kondakor	981	38.1	▲1.4
Labour	Eric Amaechi	370	14.4	▲3.5
Majority		246	9.5	
Turnout		2,585	37.9	▼7.7
Conservative hold		Swing	▼3.1	

=== Weddington ===
2022 Nuneaton and Bedworth Council election: Weddington
Party	Candidate	Votes	%	±%
Green	Michael Wright	1,171	43.4	▲2.2
Conservative	Kamaljeet Thiara	1,096	40.6	▼3.6
Labour	William Sheppard	434	16.1	▲1.4
Majority		75	2.8	
Turnout		2,705	36.7	▼6.3
Green gain from Conservative		Swing	▲2.9	

=== Wem Brook ===
2022 Nuneaton and Bedworth Council election: Wem Brook
Party	Candidate	Votes	%	±%
Labour	Tracy Sheppard	763	54.3	Steady
Conservative	Susan Dalziel	514	36.6	▲9.5
Green	Ryan Webster	102	7.3	▲3.1
TUSC	Bernadette Quinn	26	1.9	▲0.2
Majority		249	17.7	
Turnout		1,412	26.5	▼2.7
Labour hold		Swing	▼4.7	

=== Whitestone ===
2022 Nuneaton and Bedworth Council election: Whitestone
Party	Candidate	Votes	%	±%
Conservative	Kristofer Wilson	1,653	69.8	▼10.8
Labour	Dianne Fowler	470	19.9	▲0.5
Green	Sophie Bonner	244	10.3	▲10.3
Majority		1,183	50.0	
Turnout		2,378	43.5	▼1.8
Conservative hold		Swing	▼5.6	
