= 2016 Nuneaton and Bedworth Borough Council election =

Local election in the UK

← 2014	5 May 2016	2018 →
- Turnout: 31.8%
	First party	Second party	Third party
Party	Labour	Conservative	Green
Last election	15	2	1
Seats won	12	5	1
Seat change	▼3	▲3	Steady
Popular vote	12,835	10,409	3,512
Percentage	40.3%	32.7%	11.0%
- Map showing the results of the 2016 NBBC election
Council control before election
Labour Party
Council control after election
Labour Party

The 2016 Nuneaton and Bedworth Borough Council election was held on 5 May 2016 as part of the 2016 United Kingdom local elections and alongside the 2016 Warwickshire Police and Crime Commissioner election. As part of the staggered four-year election cycle, half of the borough council was up for re-election in addition to a vacant seat in the Exhall ward. Overall this meant that eighteen council seats were contested.

Prior to the election, Nuneaton and Bedworth was seen to be a "swing council" that was expected to see a drop in support for the Labour Party due to the perceived unpopularity of party leader Jeremy Corbyn. Despite losing some seats and seeing a reduced share of the popular vote, Labour retained their majority on the council. Among the seats up for election, they won twelve. The Conservative Party won five and the Green Party won one.

== Results summary ==
Total voting figures reflect that voters in the Exhall ward were entitled to cast two ballots. Change is compared to the 2012 Nuneaton and Bedworth Borough Council election but includes the vacant Exhall seat last elected in the 2014 election.

2016 Nuneaton and Bedworth Borough Council election
Party	Seats	Gains	Losses	Net gain/loss	Seats %	Votes %	Votes	+/−
Labour	12	0	3	▼3	66.7	40.3	12,835	
Conservative	5	3	0	▲3	27.8	32.7	10,409	
Green	1	0	0	Steady	5.6	11.0	3,512	
UKIP	0	0	0	Steady	0.0	14.8	4,699	
TUSC	0	0	0	Steady	0.0	0.6	193	
English Democrat	0	0	0	Steady	0.0	0.2	63	
Independent	0	0	0	Steady	0.0	0.4	124	

=== Council composition ===
Despite losing seats, the Labour Party retained their majority and control of the council.

After 2014 election		After 2016 election	
Party	Seats	Party	Seats
Labour	28	Labour	25
Conservative	3	Conservative	6
Green	2	Green	2
Independent	1	Independent	1

== Ward results ==
Turnout figures exclude invalid ballots. Swing is calculated between the winning candidate and the candidate finishing second.

=== Abbey ===
2016 Nuneaton and Bedworth Council election: Abbey
Party	Candidate	Votes	%	±%
Labour	Jill Sheppard	1,055	55.1	▼10.8
Conservative	Sajid Sayed	339	17.7	▼0.9
UKIP	Susan Edwards	311	16.3	▲16.3
Green	Sophie Bonner	141	7.4	▼2.0
TUSC	George Clark	67	3.5	▲3.5
Majority		716	37.4	
Turnout		1,913	31.8	
Labour hold		Swing	▼4.9	

=== Arbury ===
2016 Nuneaton and Bedworth Council election: Arbury
Party	Candidate	Votes	%	±%
Conservative	Clare Golby	701	43.3	▲10.7
Labour	Jack Bonner	578	35.7	▼21.7
UKIP	Andrew Hutchings	249	15.4	▲15.4
Green	Andrew Saffrey	90	5.6	▼4.4
Majority		123	7.6	
Turnout		1,618	30.8	
Conservative gain from Labour		Swing	▲16.2	

=== Attleborough ===
2016 Nuneaton and Bedworth Council election: Attleborough
Party	Candidate	Votes	%	±%
Labour	June Tandy	627	38.8	▼12.6
Conservative	Jamie Cummings	617	38.2	▼2.1
UKIP	Andrew Arnold	251	15.6	▲15.6
Green	Margaret Morrissey	93	5.8	▲5.8
English Democrat	Stephen Paxton	26	1.6	▲1.6
Majority		10	0.6	
Turnout		1614	29.1	
Labour hold		Swing	▼5.3	

=== Barpool ===
2016 Nuneaton and Bedworth Council election: Barpool
Party	Candidate	Votes	%	±%
Labour	Gwynne Pomfrett	677	47.2	▼8.9
Conservative	Jeffrey Clarke	429	29.9	▲13.7
UKIP	Dean Buffin	254	17.7	▲17.7
Green	Theresa Brookes	73	5.1	▲5.1
Majority		248	17.3	
Turnout		1,433	26.7	
Labour hold		Swing	▼11.3	

=== Bede ===
2016 Nuneaton and Bedworth Council election: Bede
Party	Candidate	Votes	%	±%
Labour	William Hancox	922	56.5	▼13.9
UKIP	Craig Carpenter	339	20.8	▲20.8
Conservative	Damon Brown	333	20.4	▲6.8
English Democrat	David Lane	37	2.3	▼4.9
Majority		583	35.7	
Turnout		1,631	32.3	
Labour hold		Swing	▼17.3	

=== Bulkington ===
2016 Nuneaton and Bedworth Council election: Bulkington
Party	Candidate	Votes	%	±%
Labour	John Beaumont	810	40.9	▼9.9
Conservative	Hayden Walmsley	726	36.7	▼12.5
UKIP	Trevor Beard	444	22.4	▲22.4
Majority		84	4.2	
Turnout		1,980	39.6	
Labour hold		Swing	▲1.3	

=== Camp Hill ===
2016 Nuneaton and Bedworth Council election: Camp Hill
Party	Candidate	Votes	%	±%
Labour	Ian Lloyd	649	48.7	▼15.0
UKIP	John Allbright	337	25.3	▲25.3
Conservative	Thomas Porter	236	17.7	▼0.4
Green	Edward Johnson	70	5.3	▲5.3
TUSC	Paul Reilly	40	3.0	▼6.7
Majority		312	23.4	
Turnout		1,332	23.4	
Labour hold		Swing	▼20.1	

=== Exhall ===
Exhall elected two councillors at this election. Doughty was elected to a four-year term and Pomfrett was elected to a two-year term. The percentage figures given reflect that voters could cast two ballots (i.e. they are not a percentage of every vote cast) and will add up to 200% as a result. Due to the nature of the election, swing calculations are not possible.

2016 Nuneaton and Bedworth Council election: Exhall
Party	Candidate	Votes	%	±%
Labour	Sara Doughty	838	51.1	
Labour	Margaret Pomfrett	720	43.9	
UKIP	Michael Gee	452	27.6	
Conservative	Barry Hallam-Lobbett	353	21.5	
Conservative	Peter Woodward Gregg	324	19.8	
UKIP	Tracy Powis	299	18.2	
Green	Merle Gering	229	14.0	
TUSC	Margaret Hunter	65	4.0	
Majority			7.2	
Turnout		1,640	26.9	
Labour hold		Swing		
Labour hold		Swing		

=== Galley Common ===
2016 Nuneaton and Bedworth Council election: Galley Common
Party	Candidate	Votes	%	±%
Conservative	Daniel Gissane	609	36.7	▼9.3
Labour	Paul Hickling	565	34.1	▼19.9
UKIP	Anthony Grant	407	24.5	▲24.5
Green	Christopher Brookes	78	4.7	▲4.7
Majority		44	2.6	
Turnout		1,659	27.7	
Conservative gain from Labour		Swing	▲5.3	

=== Heath ===
2016 Nuneaton and Bedworth Council election: Heath
Party	Candidate	Votes	%	±%
Labour	Georgina Daffern	902	52.2	▼15.5
Conservative	Bradley Price	597	34.5	▲7.0
Green	Michael Cull-Dodd	229	13.3	▲13.3
Majority		305	17.7	
Turnout		1,728	30.6	
Labour hold		Swing	▼11.3	

=== Kingswood ===
2016 Nuneaton and Bedworth Council election: Kingswood
Party	Candidate	Votes	%	±%
Labour	Barry Longden	642	49.2	▼17.4
UKIP	Joy Bent	294	22.5	▲22.5
Conservative	Neal Pointon	286	21.9	▼11.5
Green	Amanda Holtey	61	4.7	▲4.7
TUSC	Catherine Mosey	21	1.6	▲1.6
Majority		348	23.4	
Turnout		1,304	26.1	
Labour hold		Swing	▼20.0	

=== Poplar ===
2016 Nuneaton and Bedworth Council election: Poplar
Party	Candidate	Votes	%	±%
Labour	John Glass	1,133	72.3	▲3.4
Conservative	Roger Rowland	433	27.7	▲7.4
Majority		700	44.6	
Turnout		1,566	27.2	
Labour hold		Swing	▼2.0	

=== Slough ===
2016 Nuneaton and Bedworth Council election: Slough
Party	Candidate	Votes	%	±%
Conservative	Sebastian Gran	852	42.7	▲21.5
Labour	Dianne Fowler	617	31.0	▼22.4
UKIP	Andrew Wilson	400	20.1	▲20.1
Independent	John Ison	124	6.2	▼11.3
Majority		235	11.8	
Turnout		1,993	37.2	
Conservative gain from Labour		Swing	▲22.0	

=== St. Nicolas ===
2016 Nuneaton and Bedworth Council election: St Nicolas
Party	Candidate	Votes	%	±%
Conservative	Kathryn Brindley	1,140	48.1	▼1.0
Green	Michele Kondakor	879	37.1	▲17.5
Labour	Andrew Crichton	350	14.8	▼7.9
Majority		261	11.0	
Turnout		2,369	42.6	
Conservative hold		Swing	▼9.2%	

=== Weddington ===
2016 Nuneaton and Bedworth Council election: Weddington
Party	Candidate	Votes	%	±%
Green	Keith Kondakor	1,351	55.4	▲8.4
Conservative	Bethan Eddy	760	31.2	▲0.9
Labour	Brian Walmsley	328	13.4	▼9.3
Majority		591	24.2	
Turnout		2,439	41.8	
Green hold		Swing	▲3.8%	

=== Wem Brook ===
2016 Nuneaton and Bedworth Council election: Wem Brook
Party	Candidate	Votes	%	±%
Labour	Julie Jackson	967	62.8	▼9.6
Conservative	Andrew Sargeant	248	16.1	▼0.9
UKIP	Wendy Beard	235	15.2	▲15.2
Green	Michael Wright	91	5.9	▼2.1
Majority		719	46.7	
Turnout		1,541	29.1	
Labour hold		Swing	▼4.4	

=== Whitestone ===
2016 Nuneaton and Bedworth Council election: Whitestone
Party	Candidate	Votes	%	±%
Conservative	Julian Gutteridge	1,426	58.6	▼7.0
Labour	Stephen Hey	455	18.7	▼15.7
UKIP	Alwyn Waine	427	17.5	▲17.5
Green	Laurel Brindley	127	5.2	▲5.2
Majority		971	39.9	
Turnout		2,435	43.7	
Conservative hold		Swing	▲4.3	
