= 2018 Nuneaton and Bedworth Borough Council election =

2018 UK local government election

← 2016	3 May 2018	2021 →
- Map showing the results of the 2018 Nuneaton and Bedworth Borough Council election
Council control before election
Labour Party
Council control after election
No overall control

The 2018 Nuneaton and Bedworth Borough Council election was held on 3 May 2018, as part of 2018 United Kingdom local elections. Half of the council was up for election and the Labour Party lost overall control of the council to no overall control.

== Election results ==
=== 2018 Election ===
Nuneaton and Bedworth Council election, 2018 - Summary
Party	Seats	Gains	Losses	Net gain/loss	Seats %	Votes %	Votes	+/−
Conservative	11	9	0	+9	64.7	51.1	16,173	+21.2
Labour	6	0	8	-8	35.3	35.9	11,356	-5.6
Green	0	0	1	-1	0.0	9.0	2,064	+2.5
The Nuneaton and Bedworth People's Party	0	0	0	0	0.0	2.2	713	New
UKIP	0	0	0	0	0.0	0.8	253	-17.9
TUSC	0	0	0	0	0.0	0.5	168	-1.1
Independent	0	0	0	0	0.0	0.5	155	+0.4

.

Total votes cast	30,882

=== Council make up ===
Total number of seats on the Council after the elections:

Party	New council
Labour	17
Conservative	16
Green	1

== Ward results ==
Changes shown compared to the 2014 Nuneaton and Bedworth Borough Council election, when these seats were last contested. Swing figures are calculated between the winning candidate and the candidate in second place. Turnout figures include invalid ballots, therefore they may differ from total votes cast for all candidates.

=== Abbey ===
2018 Nuneaton and Bedworth Council election: Abbey
Party	Candidate	Votes	%	±%
Labour	Neil Phillips	1,018	55.2	▲0.7
Conservative	Sajid Sayed	394	21.4	▲7.1
Nuneaton and Bedworth People's Party	Edwin Gamble	228	12.4	▲12.4
Green	Sophie Bonner	145	7.9	▲1.6
TUSC	Paul Reilly	59	3.2	▼0.4
Majority		624	33.8	
Turnout		1,848	29.3	
Labour hold		Swing	▼0.4	

=== Arbury ===
2018 Nuneaton and Bedworth Council election: Arbury
Party	Candidate	Votes	%	±%
Conservative	Jayne Sargeant	904	55.3	▲22.6
Labour	Jack Bonner	586	35.8	▲0.7
Green	Margaret Morrissey	101	6.2	▲1.1
Independent	Katrina Slomczynski	45	2.8	▲2.8
Majority		318	19.4	
Turnout		1,641	30.6	
Conservative gain from Labour		Swing	▲10.9	

=== Attleborough ===
2018 Nuneaton and Bedworth Council election: Attleborough
Party	Candidate	Votes	%	±%
Conservative	Andrew Sargeant	978	56.0	▲25.8
Labour	Stephen Hey	620	35.5	▼2.6
Green	Laurel Brindley	148	8.5	▲2.4
Majority		358	20.5	
Turnout		1,749	30.7	
Conservative gain from Labour		Swing	▲14.2	

=== Barpool ===
2018 Nuneaton and Bedworth Council election: Barpool
Party	Candidate	Votes	%	±%
Labour	Patricia Elliott	744	50.1	▲6.4
Conservative	Jeffrey Clarke	607	40.8	▲16.8
Green	Theresa Brookes	135	9.1	▲9.1
Majority		137	9.2	
Turnout		1,488	27.3	
Labour hold		Swing	▼5.2	

=== Bede ===
2018 Nuneaton and Bedworth Council election: Bede
Party	Candidate	Votes	%	±%
Labour	Makayla Rudkin	681	46.1	▼10.6
Conservative	Owen Reed	653	44.2	▲25.2
UKIP	Craig Carpenter	144	9.7	▲9.7
Majority		28	1.9	
Turnout		1,481	28.6	
Labour hold		Swing	▼17.9	

=== Bulkington ===
2018 Nuneaton and Bedworth Council election: Bulkington
Party	Candidate	Votes	%	±%
Conservative	Richard Smith	1,387	71.1	▲35.4
Labour	Andrew Crichton	564	28.9	▼7.1
Majority		823	42.2	
Turnout		1,962	38.1	
Conservative gain from Labour		Swing	▲21.2	

=== Camp Hill ===
2018 Nuneaton and Bedworth Council election: Camp Hill
Party	Candidate	Votes	%	±%
Labour	Lydia Hocking	624	47.2	▼3.2
Conservative	Oluwatosin Tokode	310	23.4	▲7.9
Nuneaton and Bedworth People's Party	Barry Goss	279	21.1	▲21.1
UKIP	Anthony Grant	109	8.2	▼22.8
Majority		314	23.8	
Turnout		1,323	21.4	
Labour hold		Swing	▼5.6	

=== Exhall Ward ===
Nuneaton and Bedworth Council election: Exhall ward 2018
Party	Candidate	Votes	%	±%
Conservative	Damon Brown	1,060	50.4	+30.6
Labour	Helen Sinclair	825	39.2	−6.9
Independent	Steven Young	110	5.2	N/A
Green	Merle Gering	67	3.2	−1.7
TUSC	Natara Hunter	42	2	+0.5
Majority		235		
Turnout		2104		
Conservative gain from Labour		Swing		

=== Galley Common Ward ===
Nuneaton and Bedworth Council election: Galley Common Ward 2018
Party	Candidate	Votes	%	±%
Conservative	Sam Croft	993	60.2	+30.6
Labour	Paul Hickling	657	39.8	+4.3
Majority		336		
Turnout		1650		
Conservative gain from Labour		Swing		

=== Heath Ward ===
Nuneaton and Bedworth Council election: Heath ward 2018
Party	Candidate	Votes	%	±%
Conservative	Anne Llewellyn-Nash	1,046	55.2	+24.2
Labour	Danny Aldington	850	44.8	−13.9
Majority		196		
Turnout		1896		
Conservative gain from Labour		Swing		

=== Kingswood Ward ===
Nuneaton and Bedworth Council election: Kingswood Ward 2018
Party	Candidate	Votes	%	±%
Labour	Chris Watkins	685	48.6	+0.6
Conservative	Jamie Cummings	592	42	+21.8
Green	Andrew Saffrey	91	6.5	N/A
TUSC	Catherine Mosey	41	2.9	+0.1
Majority		93		
Turnout		1409		
Labour hold		Swing		

=== Poplar Ward ===
Nuneaton and Bedworth Council election: Poplar ward 2018
Party	Candidate	Votes	%	±%
Conservative	Bhagwant Pandher	906	52	+23
Labour	Bob Copland	836	48	−23
Majority		70		
Turnout		1742		
Conservative gain from Labour		Swing		

=== Slough Ward ===
Nuneaton and Bedworth Council election: Slough ward 2018
Party	Candidate	Votes	%	±%
Conservative	Kyle Evans	1,232	66.8	+25.4
Labour	Isaac Al Hindawi	612	33.2	−25.4
Majority		620		
Turnout		1844		
Conservative gain from Labour		Swing		

=== St. Nicolas Ward ===
Nuneaton and Bedworth Council election: St. Nicolas ward 2018
Party	Candidate	Votes	%	±%
Conservative	Robert Tromans	1,392	52.4	+8.7
Green	Michele Kondakor	974	36.7	+10.3
Labour	Joseph Bevan	288	10.9	−3.8
Majority		418		
Turnout		2654		
Conservative hold		Swing		

=== Weddington Ward ===
Nuneaton and Bedworth Council election: Weddington ward 2018
Party	Candidate	Votes	%	±%
Conservative	Hayden Walmsley	1,209	44.2	+12.8
Green	Mike Wright	1126	41.2	+2.6
Labour	Natalie Dimbleby	400	14.6	+2.1
Majority		83		
Turnout		2735		
Conservative gain from Green		Swing		

=== Wem Brook Ward ===
Nuneaton and Bedworth Council election: Wem Brook ward 2018
Party	Candidate	Votes	%	±%
Labour	Tracy Sheppard	872	54.3	+0.2
Conservative	Scott Harbison	435	27.1	+10.7
The Nuneaton and Bedworth People's Party	Terance Freeman	206	12.8	N/A
Green	Spring Vernon	67	4.2	−0.2
TUSC	Bernadette O'Toole	26	1.6	−0.2
Majority		437		
Turnout		1606		
Labour hold		Swing		

=== Whitestone Ward ===
Nuneaton and Bedworth Council election: Whitestone ward 2018
Party	Candidate	Votes	%	±%
Conservative	Kristofer Wilson	2,055	80.6	+27.3
Labour	Mark Glass	494	19.4	+1.5
Majority		1561		
Turnout		2549		
Conservative hold		Swing		
