= 2010 Nuneaton and Bedworth Borough Council election =

2010 UK local government election

Map of the results

Elections to Nuneaton and Bedworth Borough Council were held on 6 May 2010. Half of the council was up for election and the Conservative Party lost control of the council, leaving it hung and Labour the largest party. This was the first time that the borough council had been hung since before 1974 when the new authority was formed.

After the election, the composition of the council was:

- Labour 17 (+2)
- Conservative 15 (-2)
- BNP 1
- Others 1

The 2009 Camphill by-election ensured Labour 17 seats by the time of the 2010 result.

== Election results ==
Nuneaton and Bedworth Council election, 2010 - summary
Party	Seats	Gains	Losses	Net gain/loss	Seats %	Votes %	Votes	+/−
Labour	11	2	0	+2	64.7	44.9	27,604	
Conservative	6	0	2	-2	35.3	40.9	25,164	
BNP	0	0	0	0	0.0	8.2	5,028	
Green	0	0	0	0	0.0	2.8	1,737	
Liberal Democrats	0	0	0	0	0.0	2.8	1,718	
English Democrat	0	0	0	0	0.0	0.3	207	
Socialist Alternative	0	0	0	0	0.0	0.1	40	

Total votes cast	61,498
Turnout (approx)	66%

== Ward results ==
Nuneaton and Bedworth Borough Council election 2010: Abbey Ward
Party	Candidate	Votes	%	±%
Labour	PHILLIPS, Neil Joseph Patrick	1780	49.8	
Conservative	WAINE, Alwyn Joy	863	24.1	
Liberal Democrats	MILLS, Frank	563	15.7	
BNP	CLARKE, Tom	240	6.7	
Green	BRINDLEY, Laurel Emily	122	3.4	
Majority		917		
Turnout		3568	60.7%	
Labour hold		Swing		

Nuneaton and Bedworth Borough Council election 2010: Arbury Ward
Party	Candidate	Votes	%	±%
Labour	YOUNG, Kevin	1383	42.2	
Conservative	WILSON, Sonja Lund	1354	41.4	
BNP	MILLARD, Lee	309	9.4	
Green	WRIGHT, Michael Charles	224	6.8	
Majority		29		
Turnout		3270	62.8%	
Labour gain from Conservative		Swing		

Nuneaton and Bedworth Borough Council election 2010: Attleborough Ward
Party	Candidate	Votes	%	±%
Conservative	GILBERT, Peter James	1651	46.5	
Labour	TANDY, June Anne	1526	43.1	
BNP	KIMBERLEY, Phillip Barry	366	10.3	
Majority		125		
Turnout		3543	62.1%	
Conservative hold		Swing		

Nuneaton and Bedworth Borough Council election 2010: Barpool Ward
Party	Candidate	Votes	%	±%
Labour	MCGALE, Francis Patrick	1513	44.8	
Conservative	HAMMERSCHMIEDT, Andreas Franz	907	26.9	
Liberal Democrats	MOSS, Kieren Luke	517	15.3	
BNP	INGRAM, Andrew John	394	11.6	
Socialist Alternative	GEE, Steven	40	1.1	
Majority		606		
Turnout		3371	59.8%	
Labour hold		Swing		

Nuneaton and Bedworth Borough Council election 2010: Bede Ward
Party	Candidate	Votes	%	±%
Labour	HAYNES, John	1674	53.3	
Conservative	CAROLAN, John Thomas	807	25.7	
BNP	HAYCOCK, Glyn David	452	14.3	
English Democrat	David Lane	207	6.5	
Majority		867		
Turnout		3140	62.4%	
Labour hold		Swing		

Nuneaton and Bedworth Borough Council election 2010: Bulkington Ward
Party	Candidate	Votes	%	±%
Conservative	O`BRIEN, Desmond	1952	52.3	
Labour	CHATTAWAY, Richard Norman	1446	38.8	
BNP	FITZPATRICK, Leslie Peter	329	8.8	
Majority		506		
Turnout		3727	72.6%	
Conservative hold		Swing		

Nuneaton and Bedworth Borough Council election 2010: Camp Hill Ward
Party	Candidate	Votes	%	±%
Labour	HARVEY, Dennis	1512	51.7	
Conservative	PAXTON, Stephen James	854	29.2	
BNP	HOLMES, Jason	553	18.9	
Majority		658		
Turnout		2919	56.1%	
Labour hold		Swing		

Nuneaton and Bedworth Borough Council election 2010: Exhall Ward
Party	Candidate	Votes	%	±%
Labour	TAYLOR, Roma Ann	1950	47.7	
Conservative	LIGGINS, Arthur Marklew	1175	28.7	
Liberal Democrats	Alice Field	638	15.6	
BNP	Deborah Nicholas	320	7.8	
Majority		775		
Turnout		4083	62.7%	
Labour hold		Swing		

Nuneaton and Bedworth Borough Council election 2010: Galley Common Ward
Party	Candidate	Votes	%	±%
Conservative	GRANT, Matthew Petersen	1764	44.9	
Labour	JONES, Michael John	1673	42.6	
BNP	HART, Wendy	487	12.4	
Majority		91		
Turnout		3924	63.7%	
Conservative hold		Swing		

Nuneaton and Bedworth Borough Council election 2010: Heath Ward
Party	Candidate	Votes	%	±%
Labour	ALDINGTON, Danny	1768	50.3	
Conservative	LOBBETT, Walter Barry Hallam	1371	39.1	
BNP	NICOLSON, Julie	371	10.6	
Majority		397		
Turnout		3510	62.4%	
Labour gain from Conservative		Swing		

Nuneaton and Bedworth Borough Council election 2010: Kingswood Ward
Party	Candidate	Votes	%	±%
Labour	WATKINS, Christopher Mark	1564	52.6	
Conservative	BANNISTER, Michael	1045	35.1	
BNP	EDWARDS, Steven	367	12.3	
Majority		519		
Turnout		2976	60.3%	
Labour gain from Conservative		Swing		

Nuneaton and Bedworth Borough Council election 2010: Poplar Ward
Party	Candidate	Votes	%	±%
Labour	COPLAND, Robert G.	2230	62	
Conservative	BROWN, Ann Catherine	1366	38	
Majority		864		
Turnout		3596	59.8%	
Labour hold		Swing		

Nuneaton and Bedworth Borough Council election 2010: Slough Ward
Party	Candidate	Votes	%	±%
Labour	LLOYD, Anthony Alan	1824	50.4	
Conservative	DANCER, Gary William	1311	36.2	
BNP	FINDLEY, Deborah Linda	485	13.4	
Majority		513		
Turnout		3620	66.9%	
Labour gain from Conservative		Swing		

Nuneaton and Bedworth Borough Council election 2010: St. Nicolas Ward
Party	Candidate	Votes	%	±%
Conservative	CARR, David	2513	58.8	
Labour	HICKLING, Paul David	1239	29.1	
Green	KONDAKOR, Keith Anthony	518	12.1	
Majority		1274		
Turnout		4270	75.1%	
Conservative hold		Swing		

Nuneaton and Bedworth Borough Council election 2010: Weddington Ward
Party	Candidate	Votes	%	±%
Conservative	SMITH, Gerald	2540	58.6	
Labour	FOWLER, Victoria Nina Jayne	1306	30.1	
Green	Michele Kondakor	489	11.3	
Majority		1234		
Turnout		4335	73.9%	
Conservative hold		Swing		

Nuneaton and Bedworth Borough Council election 2010: Wembrook Ward
Party	Candidate	Votes	%	±%
Labour	SHEPPARD, William Henry	1863	60.1	
Conservative	DAVIES, Anthony	880	28.4	
BNP	ADDIS, Sandra Marie	355	11.5	
Majority		983		
Turnout		3098	58.7%	
Labour hold		Swing		

Nuneaton and Bedworth Borough Council election 2010: Whitestone Ward
Party	Candidate	Votes	%	±%
Conservative	WILSON, Kristofer David	2811	61.8%	
Labour	JOHNSON, Philip	1353	29.7%	
Green	OLNER, Gregg William	384	8.4%	
Majority		1458		
Turnout		4548	78.1%	
Conservative hold		Swing		
