= 2004 Nuneaton and Bedworth Borough Council election =

2004 UK local government election

Map of the results

Elections to Nuneaton and Bedworth Borough Council were held on 10 June 2004. Half of the council was up for election and the Labour Party retained control of the council.

After the election, the composition of the council was

- Labour 22
- Conservative 11
- Liberal Democrat 1

== Election results ==
Nuneaton and Bedworth Council election, 2004 – Summary
Party	Seats	Gains	Losses	Net gain/loss	Seats %	Votes %	Votes	+/−
Conservative	7	3	0	+3	41.2	47.4	14,183	
Labour	9	0	4	-4	52.9	38.1	11,402	
Liberal Democrats	1	1	0	+1	5.9	9.2	2,753	
Independent	0	0	0	0	0.0	3.1	932	
Liberal	0	0	0	0	0.0	2.2	669	

== Ward results ==
Nuneaton and Bedworth Borough Council Elections 2004: Abbey Ward
Party	Candidate	Votes	%	±%
Liberal Democrats	Peter Ashby	719	40.8	
Labour	Daniel De'Ath	559	31.7	
Conservative	Peter Gilbert	483	27.4	
Majority		160		
Turnout		1761		
Liberal Democrats gain from Labour		Swing		

Nuneaton and Bedworth Borough Council Elections 2004: Arbury Ward
Party	Candidate	Votes	%	±%
Labour	John Preedy	535	40.1	
Conservative	David Bryden	504	37.8	
Liberal Democrats	Trevor Randle	295	22.1	
Majority		31		
Turnout		1334		
Labour hold		Swing		

Nuneaton and Bedworth Borough Council Elections 2004: Attleborough Ward
Party	Candidate	Votes	%	±%
Conservative	Clive Stringer	689	37.8	
Labour	Colin Richards	516	28.3	
Liberal Democrats	Peter Lee	373	20.5	
Independent	James Hannan	244	13.4	
Majority		173		
Turnout		1822		
Conservative gain from Labour		Swing		

Nuneaton and Bedworth Borough Council Elections 2004: Barpool Ward
Party	Candidate	Votes	%	±%
Labour	Kieron Murphy	622	45.4	
Liberal	Frank Smith	377	27.5	
Conservative	Dharmy Patel	371	27.1	
Majority		245		
Turnout		1370		
Labour hold		Swing		

Nuneaton and Bedworth Borough Council Elections 2004: Bede Ward
Party	Candidate	Votes	%	±%
Labour	William Hancox	841	51.7	
Conservative	Alan Robinson	785	48.3	
Majority		56		
Turnout		1626		
Labour hold		Swing		

Nuneaton and Bedworth Borough Council Elections 2004: Bulkington Ward
Party	Candidate	Votes	%	±%
Conservative	John Ross	1,343	64.8	
Labour	Gerald Hancock	729	35.2	
Majority		614		
Turnout		2072		
Conservative hold		Swing		

Nuneaton and Bedworth Borough Council Elections 2004: Camp Hill Ward
Party	Candidate	Votes	%	±%
Labour	Michael McMahon	688	56.8	
Conservative	Mark Grant	523	43.2	
Majority		165		
Turnout		1211		
Labour hold		Swing		

Nuneaton and Bedworth Borough Council Elections 2004: Exhall Ward
Party	Candidate	Votes	%	±%
Labour	Don Navarro	901	51	
Conservative	Reg Lovick	866	49	
Majority		35		
Turnout		1767		
Labour hold		Swing		

Nuneaton and Bedworth Borough Council Elections 2004: Galley Common Ward
Party	Candidate	Votes	%	±%
Conservative	Bryan Grant	539	35.4	
Labour	Alan Clarke	445	29.3	
Liberal Democrats	Karen Naylor	331	21.8	
Independent	David Ward	206	13.5	
Majority		94		
Turnout		1521		
Conservative gain from Labour		Swing		

Nuneaton and Bedworth Borough Council Elections 2004: Heath Ward
Party	Candidate	Votes	%	±%
Labour	Ian Lloyd	702	41.6	
Conservative	Barry Lobbett	582	34.5	
Liberal Democrats	Paul Behan	402	23.8	
Majority		120		
Turnout		1686		
Labour hold		Swing		

Nuneaton and Bedworth Borough Council Elections 2004: Kingswood Ward
Party	Candidate	Votes	%	±%
Labour	Patricia Henry	546	38.8	
Conservative	Sonja Wilson	421	29.9	
Independent	Peter Everitt	235	16.7	
Liberal Democrats	Donald Thoburn	206	14.6	
Majority		125		
Turnout		1408		
Labour hold		Swing		

Nuneaton and Bedworth Borough Council Elections 2004: Poplar Ward
Party	Candidate	Votes	%	±%
Labour	Samuel Margrave	905	52.8	
Conservative	Steven O'Neill	562	32.8	
Independent	Rita Anand	247	14.4	
Majority		343		
Turnout		1714		
Labour hold		Swing		

Nuneaton and Bedworth Borough Council Elections 2004: Slough Ward
Party	Candidate	Votes	%	±%
Conservative	Jim O'Brien	842	46	
Labour	Roma Taylor	696	38	
Liberal	Frank Mills	292	16	
Majority		146		
Turnout		1830		
Conservative gain from Labour		Swing		

Nuneaton and Bedworth Borough Council Elections 2004: St. Nicolas Ward
Party	Candidate	Votes	%	±%
Conservative	Thomas Wilson	1,750	77	
Labour	Kanwardeep Singh	522	23	
Majority		1228		
Turnout		2272		
Conservative hold		Swing		

Nuneaton and Bedworth Borough Council Elections 2004: Weddington Ward
Party	Candidate	Votes	%	±%
Conservative	Jeffrey Clarke	1,652	69.6	
Labour	Brian Hawkes	722	30.4	
Majority		930		
Turnout		2374		
Conservative hold		Swing		

Nuneaton and Bedworth Borough Council Elections 2004: Wembrook Ward
Party	Candidate	Votes	%	±%
Labour	Julie Jackson	768	45	
Liberal Democrats	Janet Dijkhuisen	481	28.2	
Conservative	Marcus Jones	456	26.7	
Majority		287		
Turnout		1705		
Labour hold		Swing		

Nuneaton and Bedworth Borough Council Elections 2004: Whitestone Ward
Party	Candidate	Votes	%	±%
Conservative	Nicholas Grant	1,815	72	
Labour	Jeffrey Hunt	705	28	
Majority		1110		
Turnout		2520		
Conservative hold		Swing		
