= 2014 Nuneaton and Bedworth Borough Council election =

2014 UK local government election

Map showing the results of the 2014 Nuneaton and Bedworth Borough Council election

Elections to Nuneaton and Bedworth Borough Council took place on 22 May 2014. They coincided with other local elections happening in the UK that day, as well as the 2014 election to the European Parliament.

Labour retained control of the council, gaining 3 seats and winning back Arbury ward that was won by the Conservatives in a December 2013 byelection.

== Election results ==
=== 2014 Election ===
Nuneaton and Bedworth Council election, 2014 - Summary
Party	Seats	Gains	Losses	Net gain/loss	Seats %	Votes %	Votes	+/−
Labour	14	4	0	+4	82.4	41.5	13,069	-3.4
Conservative	2	0	5	-5	11.8	29.9	9,411	-11
Green	1	1	0	+1	5.8	6.5	2,064	+3.7
UKIP	0	0	0	0	0.0	18.7	5,882	+18.7
TUSC	0	0	0	0	0.0	1.6	506	+1.6
BNP	0	0	0	0	0.0	1.0	325	-7.2
English Democrat	0	0	0	0	0.0	0.8	238	+0.5
Independent	0	0	3	-3	0.0	0.1	28	+0.1

Total votes cast	31,523
Turnout (approx)	

=== Council make up ===
Total number of seats on the council after the elections:

Party	New council
Labour	28
Conservative	3
Green	2
Independent	1
Liberal Democrats	0

== Ward results ==
=== Abbey Ward ===
Nuneaton and Bedworth Council election: Abbey ward 2014
Party	Candidate	Votes	%	±%
Labour	Neil Phillips	1045	54.5	+4.7
UKIP	Charles Stuart	409	21.3	+21.3
Conservative	Christopher Eddy	274	14.3	−9.8
Green	Andrew Saffrey	121	6.3	+2.9
TUSC	George Clark	69	3.6	+3.6
Majority		636		
Turnout				
Labour hold		Swing		

=== Arbury Ward ===
Nuneaton and Bedworth Council election: Arbury ward 2014
Party	Candidate	Votes	%	±%
Labour	Caroline Phillips	583	35.1	−7.1
Conservative	Jeff Morgan	542	32.7	−8.7
UKIP	Andrew Hutchings	403	24.3	+24.3
Green	Maggie Morrissey	84	5.1	−1.7
BNP	Phill Kimberley	48	2.8	−6.6
Majority		41		
Turnout				
Labour gain from Conservative		Swing		

=== Attleborough Ward ===
Nuneaton and Bedworth Council election: Attleborough ward 2014
Party	Candidate	Votes	%	±%
Labour	Sam Margrave	690	38.1	−5
Conservative	Martin Heatley	547	30.2	−16.3
UKIP	Alan Baxter	397	21.9	+21.9
Green	Sophie Bonner	111	6.1	+6.1
English Democrat	Stephen Paxton	44	2.4	+2.4
TUSC	Lucy Newman	22	1.3	+1.3
Majority		143		
Turnout				
Labour gain from Conservative		Swing		

=== Barpool Ward ===
Nuneaton and Bedworth Council election: Barpool ward 2014
Party	Candidate	Votes	%	±%
Labour	Tricia Elliott	695	43.7	−1.1
UKIP	Andrew Hammerscheidt	402	25.3	+25.3
Conservative	Neal Pointon	382	24.0	−2.9
BNP	Alwyn Deacon	71	4.5	−7.1
TUSC	Paul Reilly	40	2.5	+2.5
Majority		293		
Turnout				
Labour hold		Swing		

=== Bede Ward ===
Nuneaton and Bedworth Council election: Bede ward 2014
Party	Candidate	Votes	%	±%
Labour	John Haynes	933	56.7	+3.4
Conservative	Damon Brown	312	19.0	−6.7
BNP	Yvonne Decaon	206	12.5	−1.8
English Democrat	David Lane	194	11.8	+5
Majority		621		
Turnout		1645		
Labour hold		Swing		

=== Bulkington Ward ===
Nuneaton and Bedworth Council election: Bulkington ward 2014
Party	Candidate	Votes	%	±%
Labour	Terry Doherty	748	36.0	−2.8
Conservative	Des O'Brien	741	35.7	−16.6
UKIP	Wendy Beard	589	28.3	+28.3
Majority		7		
Turnout				
Labour gain from Conservative		Swing		

=== Camp Hill Ward ===
Nuneaton and Bedworth Council election: Camp Hill ward 2014
Party	Candidate	Votes	%	±%
Labour	Dennis Harvey	713	50.4	−1.3
UKIP	Louis John	440	31.0	+31.0
Conservative	Bethan Eddy	220	15.5	−13.7
TUSC	Peter Bradley	43	3.1	−6.6
Majority		273		
Turnout				
Labour hold		Swing		

=== Exhall Ward ===
Nuneaton and Bedworth Council election: Exhall ward 2014
Party	Candidate	Votes	%	±%
Labour	Roma Ann Taylor	868	46.1	−1.6
UKIP	Karen Wilson	521	27.7	+27.7
Conservative	Roger Rowland	373	19.8	−8.9
Green	Merle Gering	92	4.9	+4.9
TUSC	Natara Hunter	30	1.5	+1.5
Majority		347		
Turnout		1884		
Labour hold		Swing		

=== Galley Common Ward ===
Nuneaton and Bedworth Council election: Galley Common Ward 2014
Party	Candidate	Votes	%	±%
Labour	Christine Bennett	614	35.5	−7.1
UKIP	Tony Grant	570	32.9	+32.9
Conservative	Phillip Seik-Neilsen	513	29.6	−15.3
TUSC	Paige Reilly-McGuire	35	2	+2
Majority		44		
Turnout		1732		
Labour gain from Conservative		Swing		

=== Heath Ward ===
Nuneaton and Bedworth Council election: Heath ward 2014
Party	Candidate	Votes	%	±%
Labour	Danny Aldington	1075	58.7	+8.4
Conservative	Janet Batterbee	568	31.0	−8.1
TUSC	Eileen Hunter	187	10.3	+10.3
Majority		507		
Turnout		1830		
Labour hold		Swing		

=== Kingswood Ward ===
Nuneaton and Bedworth Council election: Kingswood Ward 2014
Party	Candidate	Votes	%	±%
Labour	Chris Watkins	662	48%	−4.6
UKIP	Katrina Slomczynksi	399	29	+29
Conservative	Hayden Walmsley	279	20.2	−14.9
TUSC	Edward Kay	38	2.8	+2.8
Majority		263		
Turnout		1378		
Labour hold		Swing		

=== Poplar Ward ===
Nuneaton and Bedworth Council election: Poplar ward 2014
Party	Candidate	Votes	%	±%
Labour	Bob Copland	1284	71	+7
Conservative	Ann Brown	525	29	−7
Majority		759		
Turnout		1809		
Labour hold		Swing		

=== Slough Ward ===
Nuneaton and Bedworth Council election: Slough ward 2014
Party	Candidate	Votes	%	±%
Labour	Tony Lloyd	1122	58.6	+8.2
Conservative	Seb Gran	793	41.4	+5.2
Majority		329		
Turnout		1915		
Labour hold		Swing		

=== St. Nicolas Ward ===
Nuneaton and Bedworth Council election: St. Nicolas ward 2014
Party	Candidate	Votes	%	±%
Conservative	Robert Tromans	995	43.7	−15.1
Green	Michele Kondakor	602	26.4	+14.3
UKIP	Mick Gee	347	15.2	+15.2
Labour	Jack Bonner	334	14.7	−14.4
Majority		393		
Turnout		2278		
Conservative hold		Swing		

=== Weddington Ward ===
Nuneaton and Bedworth Council election: Weddington ward 2014
Party	Candidate	Votes	%	±%
Green	Ian Bonner	982	38.6	+27.3
Conservative	Jack Bircher	800	31.4	−27.2
UKIP	Trevor Beard	432	17	+17
Labour	Sonja Wilson	317	12.5	−17.6
TUSC	Brendan McGrath	13		
Majority		182		
Turnout		2544		
Green gain from Conservative		Swing		

=== Wem Brook Ward ===
Nuneaton and Bedworth Council election: Wem Brook ward 2014
Party	Candidate	Votes	%	±%
Labour	Tracy Sheppard	884	54.1	−6
UKIP	Julie Lewis	354	21.7	+21.7
Conservative	Andy Sargeant	268	16.4	−12
Green	Mike Wright	72	4.4	+4.4
TUSC	Aidan O'Toole	29	1.8	+1.8
Independent	Scott Harbison	28	1.7	+1.7
Majority		530		
Turnout		1635		
Labour hold		Swing		

=== Whitestone Ward ===
Nuneaton and Bedworth Council election: Whitestone ward 2014
Party	Candidate	Votes	%	±%
Conservative	Kristofer Wilson	1279	53.3	−8.5
UKIP	Alwyn Waine	619	25.8	+25.8
Labour	Richard Chattaway	502	20.9	−8.8
Majority		660		
Turnout		2400		
Conservative hold		Swing		
