= 2012 Nuneaton and Bedworth Borough Council election =

2012 UK local government election

Map of the results

The 2012 Nuneaton and Bedworth Borough Council election to the Nuneaton and Bedworth Borough Council took place on 3 May 2012. Half of the council was up for election. Labour gained control of the council.

== Council Composition ==
The composition of the council before the election and a summary of which parties' seats are up for election can be found in the following table:

Party	Previous council	Staying councillors	Seats up for election	Seats won	New council
Labour	17	11	6	14	25
Conservatives	14	6	8	2	8
Green	0	0	0	1	1
Independents	3	0	3	0	0
British National Party	0	0	0	0	0
English Democrats	0	0	0	0	0
Socialist Alternative	0	0	0	0	0
Trade Unionists and Socialists Against Cuts	0	0	0	0	0
UKIP	0	0	0	0	0
Libertarian Party	0	0	0	0	0
Total	34	17	17	17	34

== Election results ==
Nuneaton and Bedworth Council election, 2012 - Summary
Party	Seats	Gains	Losses	Net gain/loss	Seats %	Votes %	Votes	+/−
Labour	14	8	0	+8	82.4	53.7	14,416	
Conservative	2	0	6	-6	11.8	31.3	8,382	
Green	1	1	0	+1	5.9	7.4	1,973	
BNP	0	0	0	0	0.0	3.5	936	
Independent	0	0	3	-3	0.0	2.1	553	
UKIP	0	0	0	0	0.0	0.6	153	
Socialist Alternative	0	0	0	0	0.0	0.6	149	
TUSC	0	0	0	0	0.0	0.4	115	
English Democrat	0	0	0	0	0.0	0.4	108	
Libertarian	0	0	0	0	0.0	0.1	37	

Total votes cast	26,822
Turnout (approx)	28.2%

== Ward results ==
Abbey Ward
Party	Candidate	Votes	%	±%
Labour	Jill Sheppard	1030	65.9	
Conservative	Steve Nicklin	290	18.6	
Green	Laurel Brindley	147	9.4	
BNP	Lee Millard	96	6.1	
Majority		740		
Turnout				
Labour hold		Swing		

Arbury Ward
Party	Candidate	Votes	%	±%
Labour	Don Navarro	832	57.4	
Conservative	Richard Smith	475	32.6	
Green	Mike Wright	145	10	
Majority		360		
Turnout				
Labour gain from Conservative		Swing		

Attleborough Ward
Party	Candidate	Votes	%	±%
Labour	June Tandy	718	51.4	
Conservative	Clive Stringer	562	40.3	
BNP	Phillip Kimberley	116	8.3	
Majority		156		
Turnout				
Labour gain from Conservative		Swing		

Barpool Ward
Party	Candidate	Votes	%	±%
Labour	Gwynne Pomfrett	815	56.1	
Independent	Martyn Findley	281	19.4	
Conservative	Hayden Walmsley	235	16.2	
BNP	Alwyn Deacon	121	8.3	
Majority		534		
Turnout				
Labour gain from Independent		Swing		

Bede Ward
Party	Candidate	Votes	%	±%
Labour	Bill Hancox	1055	70.4	
Conservative	Arthur Liggins	204	13.6	
BNP	Raymond Casey	132	8.8	
English Democrat	David Lane	108	7.2	
Majority		851		
Turnout				
Labour hold		Swing		

Bulkington Ward
Party	Candidate	Votes	%	±%
Labour	John Beaumont	909	50.8	
Conservative	Julian Gutteridge	882	49.2	
Majority		27		
Turnout				
Labour gain from Conservative		Swing		

Camp Hill Ward
Party	Candidate	Votes	%	±%
Labour	Ian Lloyd	756	63.7	
Conservative	Mike Bannister	215	18.1	
BNP	Yvonne Deacon	100	8.4	
TUSC	Paul Reilly	115	9.7	
Majority		541		
Turnout				
Labour hold		Swing		

Exhall Ward
Party	Candidate	Votes	%	±%
Labour	Sara Doughty	1091	61.4	
Conservative	Anne Llewellyn-Nash	333	18.7	
Green	Merle Gering	204	11.5	
Socialist Alternative	Eileen Hunter	149	8.4	
Majority		758		
Turnout				
Labour hold		Swing		

Galley Common Ward
Party	Candidate	Votes	%	±%
Labour	Paul Hickling	688	54	
Conservative	Bryan Grant	587	46	
Majority		101		
Turnout				
Labour gain from Conservative		Swing		

Heath Ward
Party	Candidate	Votes	%	±%
Labour	Brian Hawkes	1260	67.7	
Conservative	Damon Brown	512	27.5	
BNP	Maureen Lincoln	90	4.8	
Majority		748		
Turnout				
Labour gain from Conservative		Swing		

Kingswood Ward
Party	Candidate	Votes	%	±%
Labour	Barry Longden	811	66.6	
Conservative	John Waine	407	33.4	
Majority		404		
Turnout				
Labour gain from Conservative		Swing		

Poplar Ward
Party	Candidate	Votes	%	±%
Labour	John Glass	1008	68.9	
Conservative	Ian Llewellyn-Nash	297	20.3	
BNP	Glyn Haycock	158	10.8	
Majority				
Turnout				
Labour hold		Swing		

Slough Ward
Party	Candidate	Votes	%	±%
Labour	Dianne Fowler	828	53.4	
Conservative	Stephen Paxton	329	21.2	
Independent	John Ison	272	17.5	
BNP	Stacey Fleming	123	7.9	
Majority		499		
Turnout				
Labour gain from Independent		Swing		

St. Nicolas Ward
Party	Candidate	Votes	%	±%
Conservative	Jim Foster	874	49.1	
Labour	Sam Margrave	404	22.7	
Green	Michele Kondakor	349	19.6	
UKIP	Andrew Hammerschmiedt	153	8.6	
Majority		470		
Turnout				
Conservative hold		Swing		

Weddington Ward
Party	Candidate	Votes	%	±%
Green	Keith Kondakor	1012	47	
Conservative	Jeffrey Clarke	651	30.3	
Labour	Jack Bonner	488	22.7	
Majority		361		
Turnout				
Green gain from Conservative		Swing		

Wem Brook Ward
Party	Candidate	Votes	%	±%
Labour	Julie Jackson	1049	72.4	
Conservative	Blaine Aldridge	246	17	
Green	Alex Horobin	116	8	
Libertarian	Scott Harbison	37	2.6	
Majority		803		
Turnout				
Labour hold		Swing		

Whitestone Ward
Party	Candidate	Votes	%	±%
Conservative	Nicholas Grant	1283	65.6	
Labour	Richard Chattaway	674	34.4	
Majority		609		
Turnout				
Conservative hold		Swing		
