= 2008 Nuneaton and Bedworth Borough Council election =

2008 UK local government election

Map of the results

Elections to Nuneaton and Bedworth Borough Council were held on 1 May 2008. Half of the council was up for election and the Conservative Party gained control of the council from Labour. This was the first time that the British National Party had fielded candidates in the Borough for election to the Borough Council.

After the election, the composition of the council was:

- Conservative 18
- Labour 14
- British National Party 2

== Election results ==
Nuneaton and Bedworth Council election, 2008 – Summary
Party	Seats	Gains	Losses	Net gain/loss	Seats %	Votes %	Votes	+/−
Conservative	10	4	0	+4	58.8	46.8	16,680	
Labour	5	0	6	-6	29.4	33.9	12,094	
BNP	2	2	0	+2	11.7	16.4	5,848	
Liberal Democrats	0	0	0	0	0.0	1.7	622	
Green	0	0	0	0	0.0	0.6	204	
English Democrat	0	0	0	0	0.0	0.4	133	
Socialist Alternative	0	0	0	0	0.0	0.2	88	

== Ward results ==
Nuneaton and Bedworth Borough Council Elections 2008: Abbey Ward
Party	Candidate	Votes	%	±%
Labour	Jill Sheppard	1,016	45.8	
Conservative	Stephen Paxton	608	27.4	
BNP	Caroline Hammill	391	17.6	
Green	Keith Kondakor	204	9.2	
Majority		408		
Turnout				
Labour hold		Swing		

Nuneaton and Bedworth Borough Council Elections 2008: Arbury Ward
Party	Candidate	Votes	%	±%
Conservative	Andrew Burtenshaw	804	42.2	
Labour	John Preedy	594	31.1	
BNP	Craig Fennell	347	18.2	
Liberal Democrats	Timothy Miller	162	8.5	
Majority		210		
Turnout		1907		
Conservative gain from Labour		Swing		

Nuneaton and Bedworth Borough Council Elections 2008: Attleborough Ward
Party	Candidate	Votes	%	±%
Conservative	Clive Stringer	1,048	54.7	
Labour	Daniel De'Ath	547	28.5	
BNP	Tom Clarke	322	16.8	
Majority		501		
Turnout		1917		
Conservative hold		Swing		

Nuneaton and Bedworth Borough Council Elections 2008: Barpool Ward
Party	Candidate	Votes	%	±%
BNP	Martyn Findley	663	34.2	
Conservative	James Foster	650	33.6	
Labour	Roma Taylor	624	32.2	
Majority		13		
Turnout		1937		
BNP gain from Labour		Swing		

Nuneaton and Bedworth Borough Council Elections 2008: Bede Ward
Party	Candidate	Votes	%	±%
Labour	William Hancox	835	38.4	
BNP	Alwyn Deacon	819	37.7	
Conservative	Stephen Ward	385	17.7	
English Democrat	David Lane	133	6.1	
Majority		16		
Turnout		2172		
Labour hold		Swing		

Nuneaton and Bedworth Borough Council Elections 2008: Bulkington Ward
Party	Candidate	Votes	%	±%
Conservative	Julian Gutteridge	1439	64.3	
Labour	John Haynes	800	35.7	
Majority		639		
Turnout		2239		
Conservative hold		Swing		

Nuneaton and Bedworth Borough Council Elections 2008: Camp Hill Ward
Party	Candidate	Votes	%	±%
BNP	Darren Haywood	675	36.2	
Labour	Sam Margrave	562	30.1	
Conservative	Kristofer Wilson	541	29	
Socialist Alternative	Peter Bradley	88	4.7	
Majority		113		
Turnout		1866		
BNP gain from Labour		Swing		

Nuneaton and Bedworth Borough Council Elections 2008: Exhall Ward
Party	Candidate	Votes	%	±%
Labour	Don Navarro	896	45.2	
Conservative	Alwyn Waine	550	27.7	
BNP	Deborah Nicholas	320	16.1	
Liberal Democrats	Alice Field	216	11	
Majority		346		
Turnout		1982		
Labour hold		Swing		

Nuneaton and Bedworth Borough Council Elections 2008: Galley Common Ward
Party	Candidate	Votes	%	±%
Conservative	Bryan Grant	1,118	57.4	
BNP	Shane Baynham	417	21.4	
Labour	Qamar Bhatti	413	21.2	
Majority		701		
Turnout		1948		
Conservative hold		Swing		

Nuneaton and Bedworth Borough Council Elections 2008: Heath Ward
Party	Candidate	Votes	%	±%
Conservative	Damon Brown	1,000	51.8	
Labour	Ian Lloyd	929	48.2	
Majority		71		
Turnout		1929		
Conservative gain from Labour		Swing		

Nuneaton and Bedworth Borough Council Elections 2008: Kingswood Ward
Party	Candidate	Votes	%	±%
Conservative	John Waine	750	41	
Labour	Patricia Henry	619	33.8	
BNP	Kevin Bennett	462	25.2	
Majority		131		
Turnout		1831		
Conservative gain from Labour		Swing		

Nuneaton and Bedworth Borough Council Elections 2008: Poplar Ward
Party	Candidate	Votes	%	±%
Labour	John Glass	829	41.8	
Conservative	Ann Brown	611	30.8	
BNP	Christian Hammill	396	20	
Liberal Democrats	Kevin Moore	146	7.4	
Majority		218		
Turnout		1982		
Labour hold		Swing		

Nuneaton and Bedworth Borough Council Elections 2008: Slough Ward
Party	Candidate	Votes	%	±%
Conservative	John Ison	806	37.6	
Labour	Jeffrey Hunt	725	33.8	
BNP	Adrian Deacon	517	24.1	
Liberal Democrats	Frank Mills	98	4.6	
Majority		81		
Turnout		2146		
Conservative gain from Labour		Swing		

Nuneaton and Bedworth Borough Council Elections 2008: St. Nicolas Ward
Party	Candidate	Votes	%	±%
Conservative	Thomas Wilson	1,909	77.5	
Labour	Anthony Frampton	555	22.5	
Majority		1354		
Turnout		2464		
Conservative hold		Swing		

Nuneaton and Bedworth Borough Council Elections 2008: Weddington Ward
Party	Candidate	Votes	%	±%
Conservative	Jeffrey Clarke	1,822	75.3	
Labour	Kevin Young	597	24.7	
Majority		1225		
Turnout		2419		
Conservative hold		Swing		

Nuneaton and Bedworth Borough Council Elections 2008: Wembrook Ward
Party	Candidate	Votes	%	±%
Labour	Julie Jackson	1,021	49.1	
Conservative	Andreas Hammerschmiedt	541	26	
BNP	Yvonne Deacon	519	24.9	
Majority		480		
Turnout		2081		
Labour hold		Swing		

Nuneaton and Bedworth Borough Council Elections 2008: Whitestone Ward
Party	Candidate	Votes	%	±%
Conservative	Nicholas Grant	2,098	79.8	
Labour	Eric Ireland	532	20.2	
Majority		1566		
Turnout		2630		
Conservative hold		Swing		
