= Advance UK =

Former Far-right UK political party

- Leader: Ben Habib
- Director: Howard Cox
- COO: Tim Power
- Founders: Christian Russell; Richard Shaw
- Founded: 30 June 2025; 16 months ago
- Dissolved: 10 July 2026; 4 months ago
- Split from: Reform UK
- Merged into: Great British PAC
- Headquarters: 5 Brayford Square; Stepney Green, London E1 0SG
- Ideology: British nationalism
- Political position: Far-right
- Colours: Red Blue

Website
- www.advanceuk.org.uk

Advance UK was a far-right, nationalist political party in the United Kingdom led by Ben Habib, the former Deputy Leader of Reform UK. The organisation behind the party was founded as the Integrity Party, before it was officially launched on 30 June 2025, following Habib's departure from Reform UK in November 2024, due to internal disagreements and criticism of Nigel Farage and Zia Yusuf. The party was positioned to the right of Reform UK, had over 30,000 members, and received support from Tommy Robinson and Elon Musk. Habib announced that it would dissolve as a political party on 3 June 2026, and it was officially deregistered on 10 July 2026 and merged into the Great British Political Action Committee.

== History ==
=== Background ===
Ben Habib, a former Member of the European Parliament (MEP) for the Brexit Party, served as the Deputy Leader of Reform UK from October 2023 to July 2024. He stood for Reform UK on two occasions, first at the 2024 Wellingborough by-election and later at the 2024 general election in the successor seat of Wellingborough and Rushden, where he came third on 21.5 per cent of the vote.

Habib faced criticism after a Talk TV interview in April 2024, after he suggested Britain should 'absolutely' let migrants drown in the English Channel. In July 2024, he expressed concerns after his removal as Deputy Leader, and later criticised Reform UK's new constitution as "undemocratic".

Following the falling-out between Habib and Farage, on 28 November 2024, Habib announced he was leaving Reform UK. Habib cited ideological differences with Farage, such as Habib's support for mass deportations, as well as the structure of the party. After leaving, Habib said he wished to create a new party that would be to the right of Reform UK. He later stated that Elon Musk had urged him to set up a party in early 2025.

In March 2025, Habib called Reform MP Rupert Lowe's suspension 'an injustice', accusing Farage and Reform UK chairman Zia Yusuf of 'trumping up complaints against' Lowe after Musk suggested Lowe should become Leader of Reform UK.

In April 2025, Habib took control of the Integrity Party, an organisation which had been created by Christian Russell and Richard Shaw in 2024, and stated that he intended to make sure the party was properly set up and organised before it was registered.

=== Establishment ===
On 30 June 2025, Habib became leader of the party, launched as 'Advance UK'. He stated that he would both apply for registration with the Electoral Commission, and donate £100,000 to the party, once it had reached 30,000 members. The limited company behind the organisation was also renamed to Advance UK. Restore Britain, a far-right pressure group, was established by Rupert Lowe later that day.

Sean O'Grady wrote that Advance UK had a "complicated" and ostensibly "unworkable system of governance", whereby party members could elect 'the college', which would vote for proposed policies, and was intended to guide the party's board of directors and the executive, consisting of the party leaders. According to The Telegraph, those recruited for 'the college' included Katie Waissel and Howard Cox.

In July 2025, Habib told the News Letter that he hoped to work with Jim Allister, the leader of the Traditional Unionist Voice (TUV), in Northern Ireland. Habib had originally signed an alliance between Reform UK and the TUV, and suggested that Farage didn't stand for the Acts of Union 1800.

In early August, prominent far-right activist Tommy Robinson announced he would be joining the party. Later that month, four former parliamentary candidates and one branch chair defected from Reform UK. On 26 August 2025, Elon Musk declared his support for the party, saying: "Advance UK will actually drive change. Farage is weak sauce who will do nothing." Patrick English, director of political analytics at YouGov, said that the party "certainly might have the potential to be disruptive but they'll need to work very hard to find people capable of fronting it".

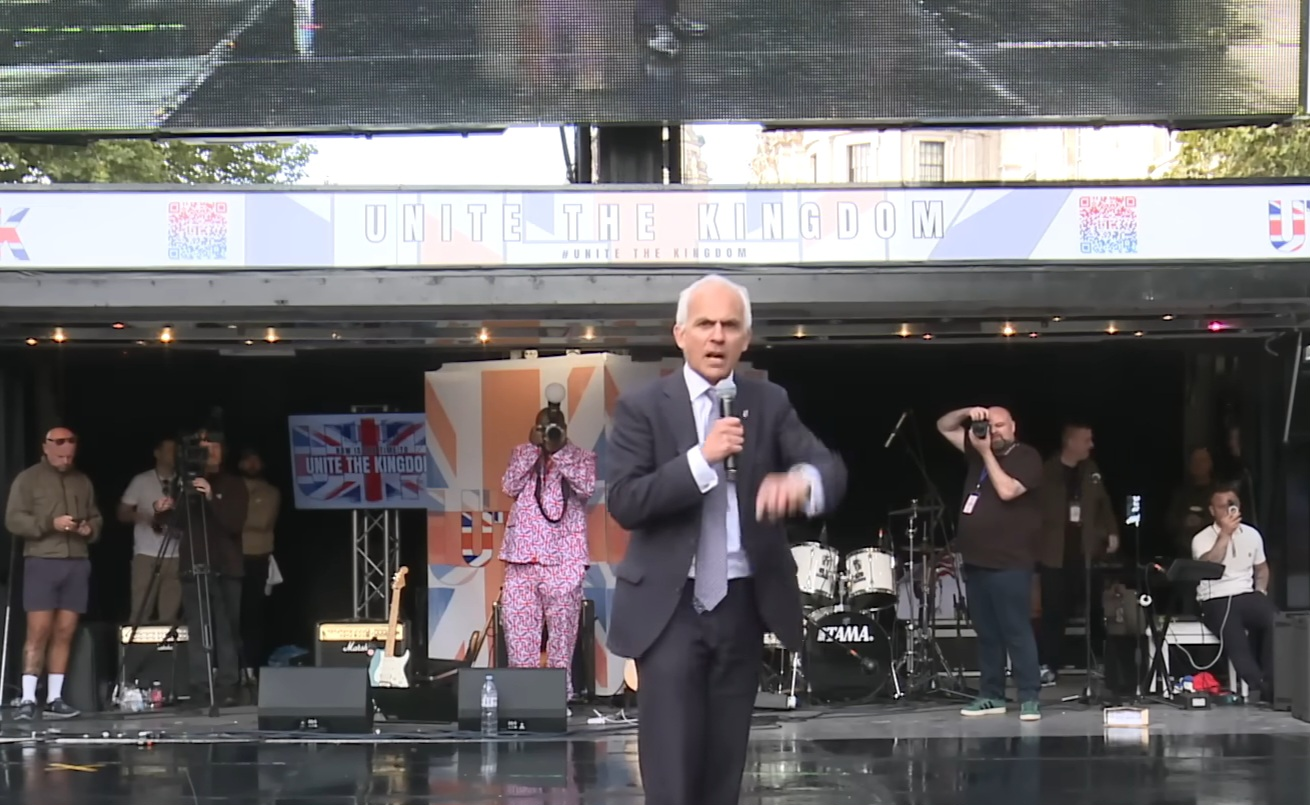
Habib speaking at the Unite The Kingdom rally, 13 September 2025

On 13 September, Habib led a speech at the 'Unite the Kingdom' march held in Central London, which had been organised by Tommy Robinson. Advance UK was listed as a sponsor of the event, which drew between 110,000 and 150,000 attendees.

In late September 2025, shortly before the party’s inaugural launch event in Newcastle, the council-owned Crowne Plaza Hotel cancelled the booking on health and safety grounds following online criticism, including from North East Mayor Kim McGuinness, over its association with Tommy Robinson. Habib responded by insisting the launch would still proceed, stating that “no threats or smears” would stop the party from launching and that its members had “a right for political association and gathering”.

In November 2025, Sky News published analysis of right-wing and extreme bias on X. Habib was interviewed, in which he described the platform as "vital" to Advance UK, and said all of its members had come through X, podcasts, YouTube, and other social media. Following an endorsement from Musk, membership had increased to more than 37,000, whilst the party was seeking registration with the Electoral Commission.

On 4 December, Advance UK was registered to stand candidates across Great Britain. Suzanne Breen wrote that, in Northern Ireland, the party had 600 members, and was preparing to organise there.

On 31 December, The Independent reported that both Advance UK and Britain First were selling official merchandise manufactured in China and Pakistan.

By 7 January 2026, seven regional organisers had been announced by Advance UK, including Michelle Ballantyne, the former Leader of Reform UK Scotland.

The party's Welsh branch was led by Richard Taylor, who had previously advocated for the expulsion of Islam from the United Kingdom. Taylor resigned from his position on 31 January 2026, citing personal reasons.

On 7 February 2026, the party held a conference, proposing its immigration policies, at the Emmanuel Centre, an evangelical church in Westminster. The Emmanuel Centre was criticised by groups including Christians for a Welcoming Britain for hosting what they described as a "far-right political conference". During the event, Habib told The Guardian that he had put £100,000 into the party and it had raised £600,000 from other sources.

Following the announcement of Restore Britain as a political party on 13 February 2026, Habib stated that Advance UK would consider a merger with the new political party. Hope not Hate outlined how the more extreme factions within Restore were strongly opposed to having someone of Pakistani heritage in a leadership role. The merger proposals later failed, with Habib calling Lowe a "dictator" for not having drafted a party constitution.

=== Dissolution ===
On 3 June 2026, Habib announced his intention to de-register Advance UK as a political party, and merge into the Great British Political Action Committee (GB PAC), a right-wing advocacy group of which Habib serves as chairman. At the time, Advance UK had over 30,000 members and held four council seats, but had struggled to gain traction since the emergence of Restore Britain. Lowe supported the move on X writing that Habib and Advance UK supporters would be “welcome in our Restore Britain family.”

Membership ballot: 5–7 June 2026
Option	Votes	%
Yes — Support the proposal	6,442	87.5
No — Oppose the proposal	921	12.5
Majority	5,521	75.0
Turnout	7,363	19.5

Four days later, Lorna Smyth, the regional director for Northern Ireland, resigned over the decision to de-register the party.

Later that month, leaked emails revealed that Tim Power, the party's chief operating officer (COO), had written to members arguing that the decision was unconstitutional, in an attempt to block the merger and launch a counter coup against Habib. Byline Times later reported that Habib had threatened Power with legal action, and reported him to the police. Power had filed a complaint to the Electoral Commission on 6 June, and stated that Habib had a conflict of interest, being the chairman of GB PAC.

The party was voluntarily deregistered on 10 July 2026.

== Ideology and platform ==
Advance UK was described as part of the "multiracial far-right", with the party favouring the deportation of illegal migrants, who Habib referred to as "criminals". Its policies called for the reversal of asylum grants and residency rights, withdrawal from the European Convention on Human Rights, and the repeal of the Human Rights Act and Equality Act. The Joseph Rowntree Foundation described Advance UK's founding conference in the North East as "a troubling development" and labelled the party as right-wing.

In June 2025, Sean O'Grady suggested that Advance UK was part of the 'fringe far-right', and wrote that the party was potentially extremist, referencing Habib's previous comments on migrants in the English Channel. In September 2025, The Conversation categorised Habib as part of an online group of "free marketeers", and likened him to Rupert Lowe; two disaffected conservatives who led alternative movements, and who were both pushing Reform UK towards more radical positions.

In the Financial Times, Anna Gross wrote that Habib was working to prevent Nigel Farage from winning the next UK general election, as Habib's more hard-line party could take votes from those who consider Farage too moderate. Further, Alex Kane of The Irish News suggested that Advance UK was "in danger of becoming an anti-Farage party rather than a genuine alternative to Reform".

In April 2025, Habib stated that his incoming party would abolish quangos created under Tony Blair and enact "Liz Truss style" tax-cuts. When the party launched two months later, Habib wrote: "The party will stand for the entire country in all its parts and for all its people. We will fight for nation, freedom of speech, democracy and equality before the law. We will not flinch."

== Electoral history ==
=== Parliamentary elections ===
On 4 February 2026, former charity worker Nick Buckley was announced as the Advance UK candidate for the 2026 Gorton and Denton by-election. He placed seventh with 154 votes.

=== Local elections ===
Advance UK stood 17 candidates across 16 wards in the 2026 United Kingdom local elections, none of whom were elected.

Council	Candidates	Votes
Bolton	1	71
Essex	2	164
Rochdale	1	52
Salford	1	101
Sandwell	1	113
Trafford	6	205
Walsall	5	1,324
Total	17	2,030

=== Scottish Parliament elections ===
Advance UK contested the 2026 Scottish Parliament election, but won no seats.

Election	Leader	Constituency			Regional			Total seats	±	Rank	Government
Election	Leader	Votes	%	Seats	Votes	%	Seats	Total seats	±	Rank	Government
2026	Ben Habib (Note: Ben Habib served as party leader, whist the Scotland branch was overseen by regional director Michelle Ballantyne.)	328	0.01	0 / 73	2,145	0.09	0 / 56	0 / 129	N/A	15th	Not elected
