= Ben Habib =

British politician and businessman (born 1965)

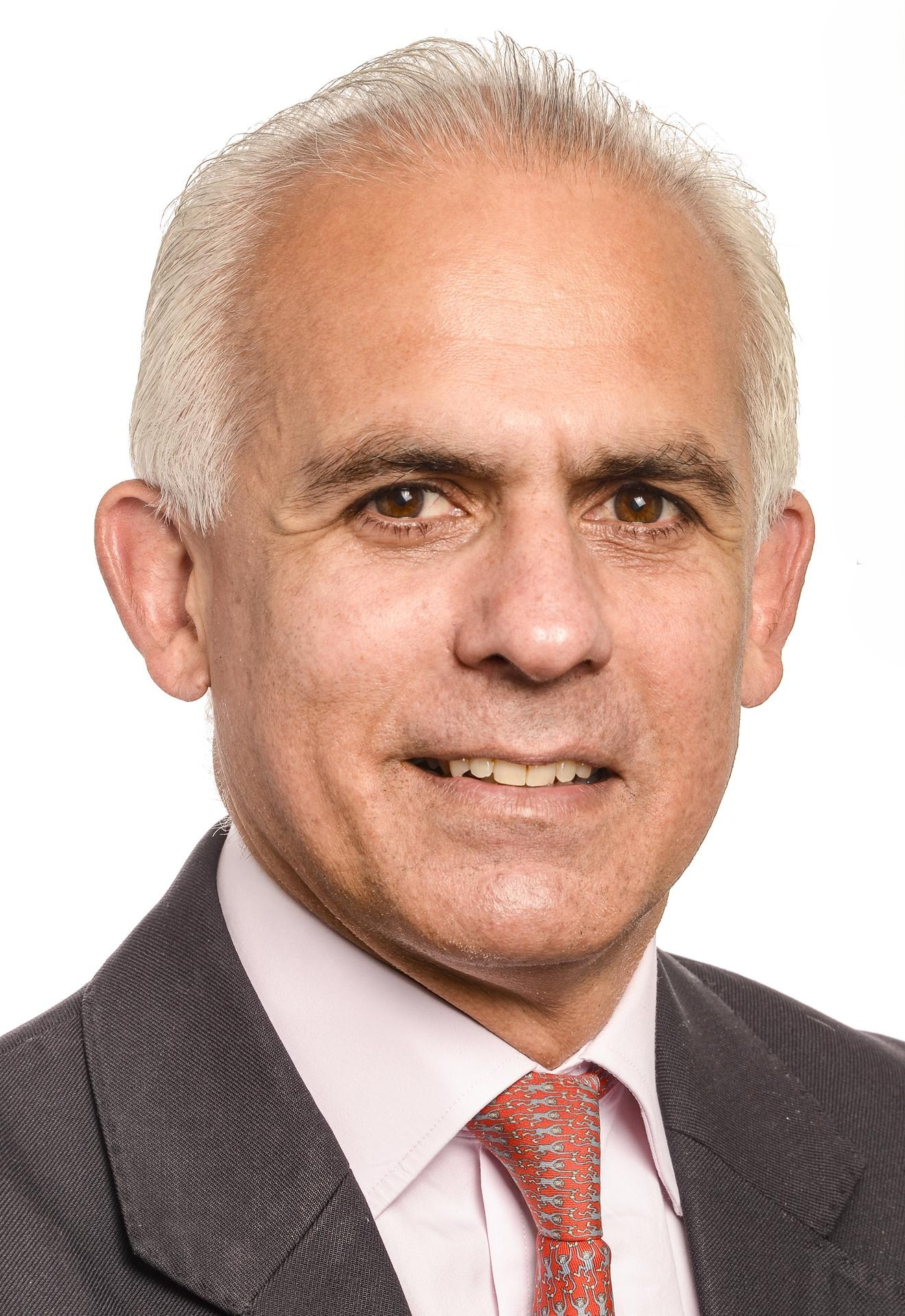
- Official portrait, 2019

Chairman of the Great British PAC
- Incumbent
- Assumed office 4 September 2024
- Preceded by: Position established

Leader of Advance UK
- In office 30 June 2025 – 10 July 2026
- Preceded by: Position established
- Succeeded by: Position abolished

Co-Deputy Leader of Reform UK
- In office 7 October 2023 – 11 July 2024 Serving with David Bull
- Leader: Richard Tice; Nigel Farage
- Preceded by: David Bull
- Succeeded by: Richard Tice

Member of the European Parliament for London
- In office 2 July 2019 – 31 January 2020
- Preceded by: Gerard Batten
- Succeeded by: Constituency abolished

Personal details
- Born: Benyamin Naeem Habib; 7 June 1965 (age 61) Karachi, West Pakistan
- Party: Independent (since 2026)
- Other political affiliations: Conservative (until 2019); Reform UK (2019–2024); Independent (2024–2025); Great British PAC (since 2024); Advance UK (2025–2026)
- Children: 3
- Education: Robinson College, Cambridge (BA)
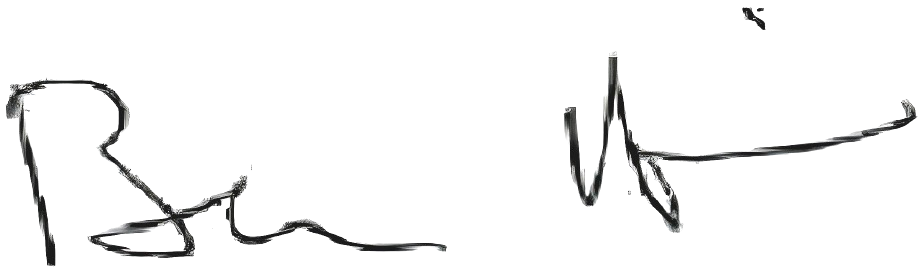
- Signature

Benyamin Naeem Habib (born 7 June 1965) is a Pakistan-born British politician and businessman who was the co-deputy leader of Reform UK from 2023 to 2024. He is the chief executive officer of First Property Group, a property investment company, and the chairman of Great British PAC, a political advocacy group.

Born in Karachi, West Pakistan, Habib graduated in natural sciences from University of Cambridge. He previously served as a Brexit Party Member of the European Parliament (MEP) for London from July 2019 until the UK left the European Union in January 2020. Prior to this, he had donated to the Conservative Party. Habib was co-deputy leader of Reform UK from October 2023 to July 2024, when he was replaced by Richard Tice following the 2024 general election. He then served as leader of Advance UK from June 2025 until it was dissolved and merged into the Great British PAC in June 2026.

== Early life ==
Benyamin Naeem Habib was born in Karachi, West Pakistan on 7 June 1965 to a Pakistani father and an English mother. His maternal grandfather fought at the Battle of the Somme; his paternal grandfather was born on a farm in Punjab.

He moved to England with his parents in 1979 and attended Rugby School, a boarding school in Warwickshire. He later became head boy and president of the Rugbeian Society.

He studied natural sciences at Robinson College, Cambridge, from 1984 where he was awarded a Boxing Blue.

== Business career ==
After graduating at university, Habib became a financial analyst at the corporate finance department at Lehman Brothers in 1987. In 1989, he was appointed as the finance director of the insurance broker PWS Holdings.

In 1994 Habib became managing director of a private property development company, JKL Property. In 2000, he set up a commercial property fund investment company, First Property Group plc. The company, for which he is chief executive officer, operates in the United Kingdom, Poland, and Romania. In 2024, Habib ordered a share issue worth £3m after the firm reported a pre-tax loss of £4.41m.

In July 2025, the Financial Times reported that Habib had purchased £80,000 worth of shares, increasing his holding in the company to nearly 17 per cent.

== Political career ==
=== Euroscepticism ===
Habib was a Conservative Party voter and donor until 2019. He supported Brexit in the 2016 EU membership referendum, arguing that the UK would benefit from trade opportunities, regained sovereignty, and control over immigration. He supported a No-deal Brexit which reportedly would have been favourable to his business.

During the 2019 European parliament elections, Habib stood as the first of six candidates for the Brexit Party in the London constituency, and was elected as one of its two MEPs in London. Habib sat with the Committee on Economic and Monetary Affairs, was delegated for relations with the countries of South Asia.

According to Transparency International, Habib was the wealthiest MEP in the Ninth European Parliament based on annual earnings from his other job. He declared €960,000 annual earnings from his company, First Property Group. In January 2020 Habib voted in favour of the Brexit withdrawal agreement, which included the Northern Ireland Protocol, which was ratified by the EU Parliament.

In February 2020 Habib described the Protocol as being a unique advantage to Northern Ireland, as it could create a tiger economy. He also urged Unionists to 'make it work for its own great benefit and that of the United Kingdom'.

=== Legal challenge against the Northern Ireland Protocol ===
In February 2021, Habib, together with TUV party leader Jim Allister, and Baroness Hoey, applied for a judicial review of the Northern Ireland Protocol. They were later joined in their litigation by Arlene Foster, the incumbent First Minister of Northern Ireland; David Trimble, the inaugural First Minister; and Steve Aiken, leader of the UUP. The main cause of their legal action was to scrutinise the legality and constitutionality of the Protocol, with regard to their claim that it, and related regulations were incompatibile with the Acts of Union 1800.

In June 2021, the High Court of Northern Ireland (HCNI) in Belfast dismissed the legal challenge on several grounds, including its conflict with the Acts of Union 1800 and thus unconstitutional. The HCNI ruled that although the Protocol conflicted with the Acts of Union the European Union (Withdrawal Agreement) Act 2020 also has constitutional effect and had implicitly repealed aspects of the Acts. The court also rejected arguments based on the Northern Ireland Act, the European Convention on Human Rights and EU law. Likewise, the court rejected a challenge to the Regulations, which provided that the consent mechanism in the Protocol was not to be subject to the cross-community voting rules in the Assembly. On 14 March 2022, that decision was affirmed by the Northern Ireland Court of Appeal, with the judgment making reference to the 'obvious inconsistency' of Habib first voting in favour of the Withdrawal Agreement and Northern Ireland Protocol, as stated in paragraph 11 of his sworn affidavit, but then subsequently calling for a repudiation.

On 30 November 2022, it was appealed to the Supreme Court of the United Kingdom. On 8 February 2023, the Supreme Court dismissed the challenge. On 21 March 2023, Northern Ireland Office minister Lord Caine (responding to a written question by Kate Hoey) asserted that the UK Government had spent £196,567 on legal fees associated with defending the challenges against the Northern Ireland Protocol.

=== Reform UK ===
In October 2023 he was appointed a co-deputy leader of Reform UK, alongside David Bull, who had been deputy since 2021. At the same time he became the party's Brexit and the Union spokesman. He was the party's candidate for the Wellingborough by-election in February 2024. Habib finished third of eleven candidates, with 13% of the vote, the party's best result at a by-election. He was the Reform candidate for Wellingborough and Rushden constituency at the 2024 general election where he came third with 21.5% of the vote.

In April 2024, Habib was criticised for remarks he made during an interview with Julia Hartley-Brewer on Talk TV, where he suggested that migrants crossing the English Channel by boat should be left to drown. Habib defended his comments, as he was asked about migrants that slashed their boats, causing them to sink. Habib stated: 'If people are going to repeatedly throw themselves in the channel and refuse the help of our specialised force in order to get back in the boats and go on to France – of course their lives are going to be in danger.'

=== Criticism of Reform UK ===
In July 2024 Habib was removed as the deputy leader of Reform UK and replaced by Richard Tice. He then criticised the new constitution as 'undemocratic'.

Habib was appointed as chairman of Great British PAC in September 2024.

Habib left Reform UK on 28 November 2024, after a reported fallout with Nigel Farage and Zia Yusuf. He said he was concerned about the party's structure as well as having "fundamental differences" over Brexit, and disagreements over immigration, with Habib in favour of mass deportations.

In March 2025, Habib called Reform MP Rupert Lowe's suspension 'an injustice'. Habib accused Farage and Reform UK chairman Yusuf of 'trumping up complaints against' Lowe to oust him after Elon Musk suggested Lowe should become Leader of Reform UK instead of Farage. Habib called for both men's resignations. On 7 July 2026, Habib told The Independent that he had contacted the Electoral Commission, urging them to investigate allegations that Nigel Farage had failed to properly declare donations from a convicted criminal over a five-year period.

=== Leader of Advance UK ===
In April 2025, Ben Habib assumed control of the Integrity Party, a political organisation founded by Christian Russell and Richard Shaw in late 2024. He also stated that it had gained 600 members and £18,000 in donations since announcing the party. On 30 June 2025, Habib became leader of the party, launched as 'Advance UK'. He stated that he would both apply for registration with the Electoral Commission, and donate £100,000 to the party, once it had reached 30,000 members.

Habib led a speech at the 'Unite the Kingdom' march held in Central London on 13 September 2025, which drew 150,000 attendees. Advance UK was listed as a sponsor of the event, which was organised by the far-right activist Tommy Robinson, who had announced that he was joining the party, in support of Habib, one month earlier.

In late September 2025, before the party’s inaugural launch event in Newcastle, the council-owned Crowne Plaza Hotel cancelled the booking on health and safety grounds following online criticism, including from North East mayor Kim McGuinness, over its association with Tommy Robinson. Habib responded by insisting the launch would still proceed, stating that “no threats or smears” would stop the party from launching and that its 35,000 members had “a right for political association and gathering”.

Habib faced criticism in late November 2025, when he told Hilary Schan, who spoke in support of Irish reunification at the Your Party conference, to "go back to the Republic".

In February 2026, Habib stated that Advance UK would consider a merger with the new political party Restore Britain, led by Rupert Lowe. Hope not Hate outlined how the more extreme Restore members would oppose someone of Pakistani heritage having a leadership role. The proposals later failed, with Habib calling Lowe a "dictator" for not having drafted a party constitution, and stating that Restore had gone "full tilt racist" after Habib was subjected to ethnic slurs by its supporters.

Advance UK fielded 11 candidates in the 2026 Scottish Parliament election, and 17 at the 2026 English local elections. On 16 May 2026, Habib gave an address, in which he criticised other parties for not engaging with Robinson's supporters, at the second 'Unite the Kingdom' march, which attracted around 60,000 people.

=== Merger between Advance UK and the Great British PAC ===
The following month Habib announced his intention to de-register Advance UK as a party and merge it into the Great British Political Action Committee (GB PAC), due to Lowe's Restore Britain and Reform having “created a crowded field”, and adding that “several parties competing for the same patriotic vote cannot serve Britain.” Tim Power, the party's then-chief operating officer, attempted to block the merger by writing to members saying that the decision was unconstitutional, and that Habib held a conflict of interest, being the chairman of GB PAC. Habib later reported Power to the police and threatened him with legal action.

Advance UK was subsequently merged into the GB PAC following the voluntary de-registration of the party on 10 July 2026.

== Views ==
Habib has stated that he believes in freedom of religion, but that Britain has to promote its "Christian constitution and culture". At an Oxford Union debate in April 2026, he argued that Islam was not compatible with liberal democracy.

Habib has said that there is no longer a political division between left and right in the United Kingdom, but between “those who believe in global principles and so-called liberalism, and those who actually believe in a nation state borders sovereignty”.

== Personal life ==
Habib identifies as a non-practising Christian. Despite his Pakistani heritage, he was raised with a "soft Christian upbringing" and has never been a Muslim. He was baptised in 1994 so that he could marry his English wife in a church, though he rarely attends church services.
