= Frontbench team of Nigel Farage =

Frontbench team of Reform as of 2026

Spokesperson team of Nigel Farage
- 2026–present
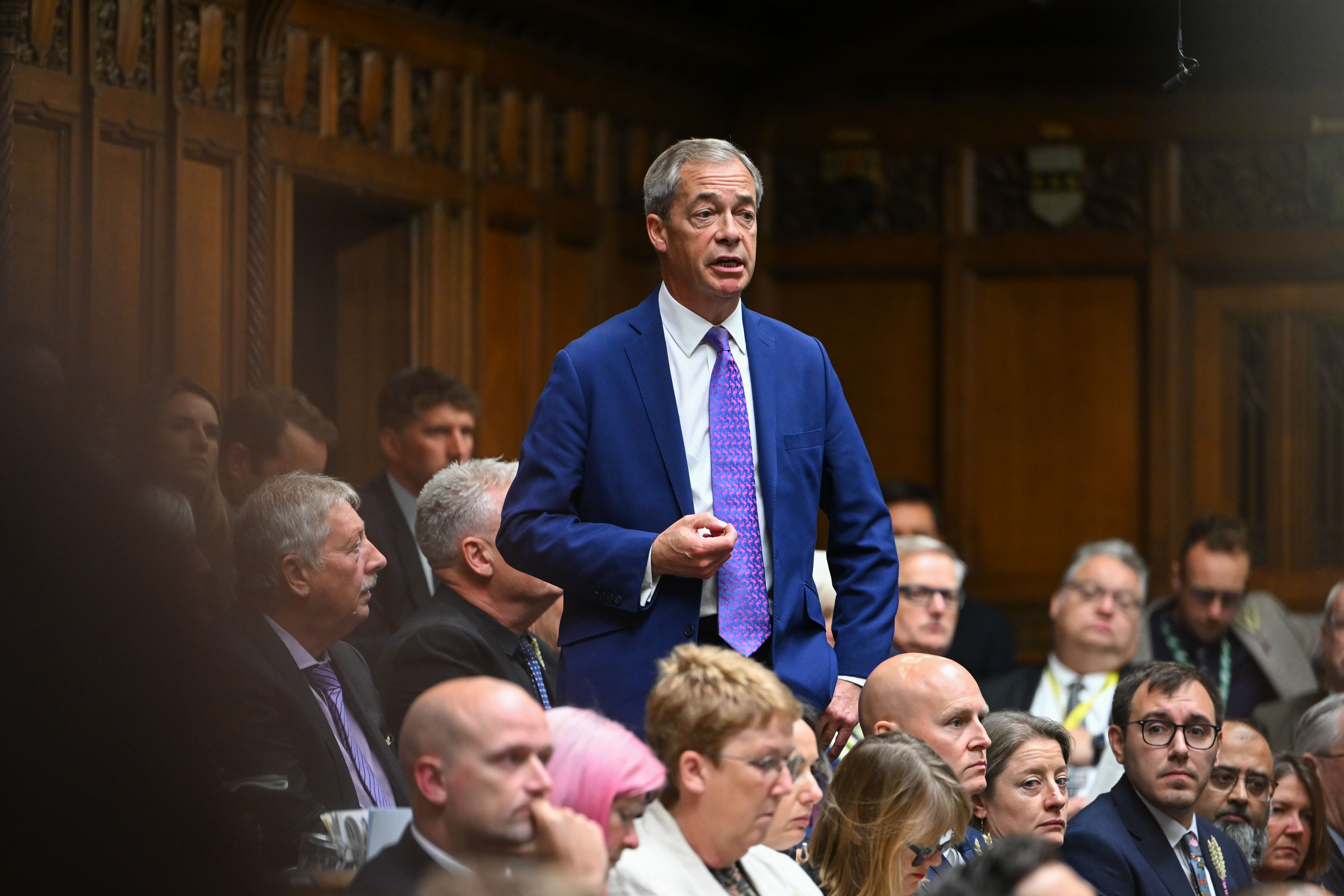
- Date formed: 17 February 2026

People and organisations
- Monarch: Charles III
- Leader: Nigel Farage
- Deputy Leader: Richard Tice
- Member party: Reform UK
- Status in legislature: Opposition 8 / 650 (1%)

History
- Legislature term: 2024 UK Parliament
- Predecessor: Spokesperson team of Richard Tice

Nigel Farage was appointed Leader of Reform UK for the second time in 2024. On 17 February 2026, Farage announced the creation of the first Reform UK spokesperson team. Similar to the official Shadow Cabinet or the Liberal Democrat frontbench team, Reform members were assigned certain portfolios for which they are to be the main spokespersons.

The team was described by Farage as a shadow cabinet due to the party's at the time lead in national opinion polls and the prospect of it forming government without ever having been the official opposition.

== Current spokesperson team ==
Key
| Sits in the House of Commons |
| Non-parliamentarian |

Frontbench team of Nigel Farage
| Portfolio | Current holder | Term |
|---|---|---|
| Leader | Nigel Farage; MP | 2024–present |
| Deputy Leader | Richard Tice; MP | 2024–present |
| Head of Department of Government Efficiency | Richard Tice; MP | 2025–present |
| Business, Trade and Energy | Richard Tice; MP | 2026–present |
| Treasury | The Rt Hon; Robert Jenrick; MP | 2026–present |
| Party Chairman | Zia Yusuf | 2024–2025 |
| Head of Policy | Zia Yusuf | 2025–2026 |
| Home Affairs | Zia Yusuf | 2026–present |
| Armed Forces | Angus MacIntyre | 2026–present |
| Head of Preparation for Government | Danny Kruger; MP | 2025–present |
| Education, Skills and Equality | The Rt Hon; Suella Braverman; MP | 2026–present |
| Justice | Sarah Pochin; MP | 2026–present |
| Chief Whip | Lee Anderson; MP | 2024–present |
| Party Chairman | Lee Anderson; MP | 2026–present |
| Work, Pensions and Welfare | Lee Anderson; MP | 2025–present |

=== Former spokespeople ===
| Portfolio | Holder | Term | Notes |
|---|---|---|---|
| Head of Policy | James Orr | 2025–2026 | Orr stood down the day after he was secretly filmed helping Reform UK to break campaign finance laws. The chair of Reform UK, Lee Anderson, said that there was "no chance" of Orr returning. |
| Immigration and Justice | Ann Widdecombe | 2024–2026 | Held the position until her death in July 2026. |
| Party Chairman | David Bull | 2025–2026 | Stepped down in order to "focus on standing at the next election". |

Farage additionally announced Tice would be appointed Deputy Prime Minister and First Secretary of State if Reform UK formed the next government.

== See also ==
- List of Reform UK politicians
- List of Conservative Party defections to Reform UK
- Reform UK Board
- Kemi Badenoch shadow cabinet
- Frontbench team of Ed Davey
- Cabinet of the United Kingdom
- Official Opposition Shadow Cabinet (United Kingdom)
