= Reform Party leadership of Nigel Farage =

Nigel Farage's tenure as Leader of the Reform Party

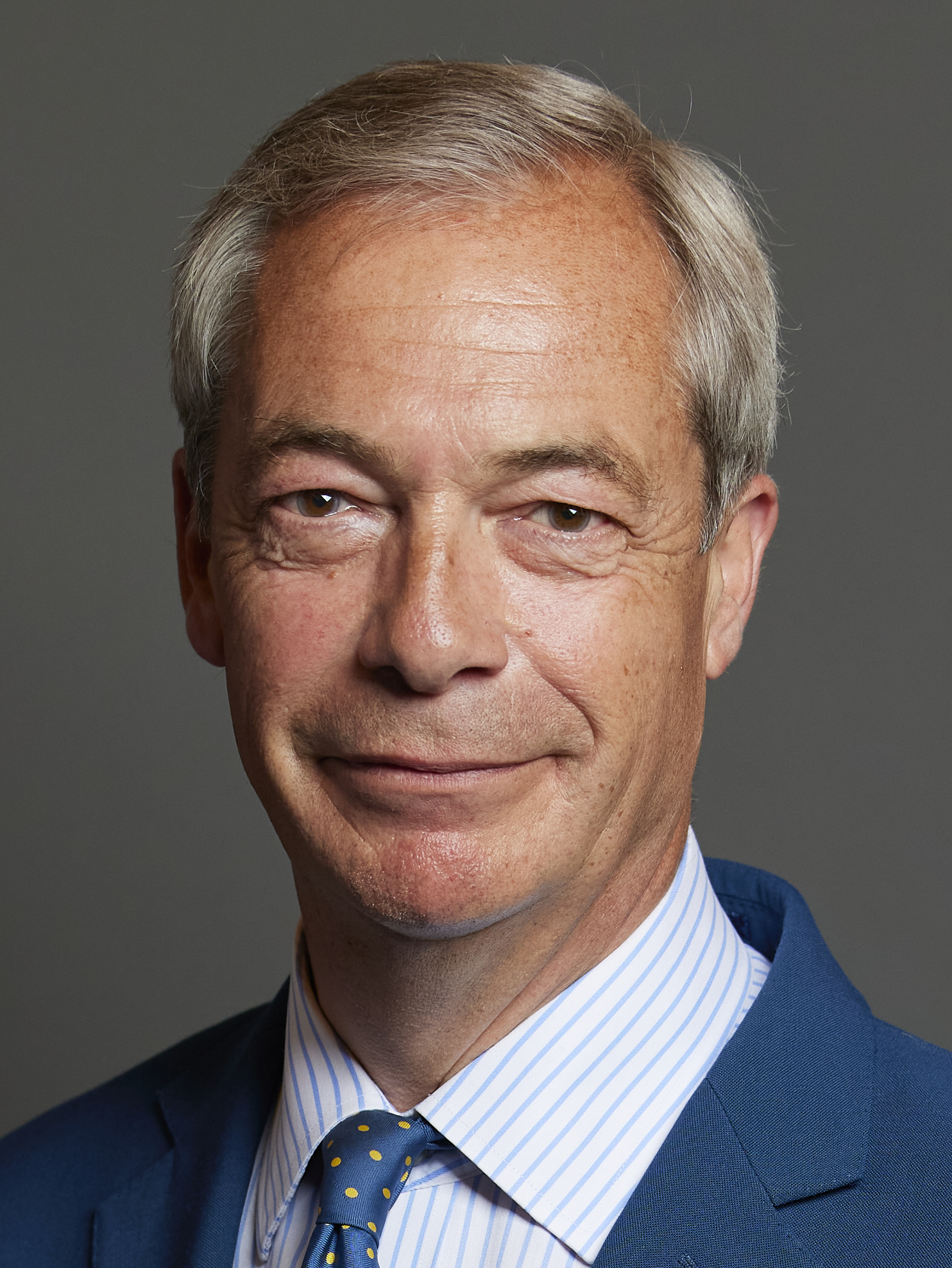
- Official portrait, 2024
- Reform Party leadership of Nigel Farage; First term 21 March 2019 – 6 March 2021; Second term 3 June 2024 – present
- Cabinet: Frontbench cabinet
- Party: Reform
- Election: Leadership; 2019; 2024; General; 2019; 2024
- First term 21 March 2019 – 6 March 2021
- Monarch: Elizabeth II
- Second term 3 June 2024 – present

Nigel Farage was elected as Leader of Reform in March 2019, following the resignation of Catherine Blaiklock after she had made anti-Islamic and racist statements online.

== First term (2019-2021) ==
Farage has been leader of reform since June 2024. Reform, formerly the Brexit Party, is a right-wing populist and far-right political party in the United Kingdom. It has eight members of Parliament in the House of Commons, two members of the London Assembly, thirty-four members of the Senedd, seventeen members of the Scottish Parliament, one police and crime commissioner, and controls twenty-six local councils. It is to the right of the Conservative Party.

Reform is a limited company (Reform UK Party Limited) with fifteen shares. Farage owned 53% of the shares in the company, giving him a controlling majority. In August 2024, Paul Oakden was removed and Farage took over his share, giving him 60% ownership.

The incorporation of the Brexit Party in November 2018 was formally announced on 20 January 2019 by former UK Independence Party (UKIP) economics spokesperson Catherine Blaiklock, who served as the Brexit Party's initial leader. On 8 February 2019, it was approved by the Electoral Commission to run candidates in English, Scottish, Welsh and European Union elections.

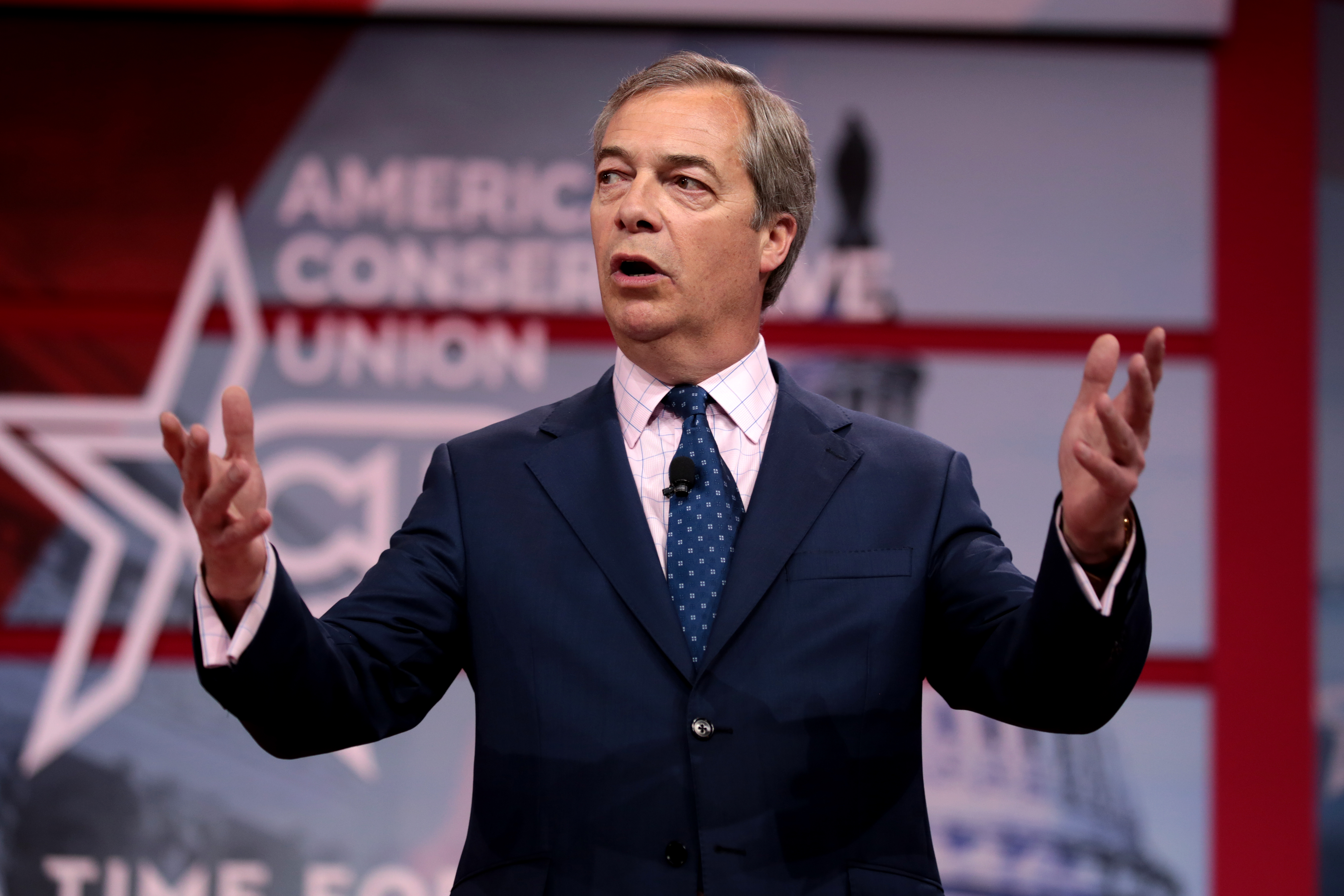
Farage at the Conservative Political Action Conference (CPAC) in the US in 2018

On 13 February, Farage confirmed he would sit in the European Parliament as a member of the Brexit Party.

=== Leader of Reform ===
On 22 March, he was announced as the new party leader, following the resignation of Catherine Blaiklock.

On 20 May 2019, a Brexit opponent threw a milkshake at Farage in Newcastle upon Tyne. The assailant, who was arrested at the scene, accused Farage of "spouting bile and racism". Farage tweeted about the incident saying: "For a civilised democracy to work you need the losers' consent, politicians not accepting the referendum result have led us to this". A month later, 32-year-old Paul Crowther pleaded guilty to common assault and criminal damage at Tyneside Magistrates' Court, where District Judge Bernard Begley ordered him to carry out 150 hours of community service and pay £350 compensation to Farage.

=== Hiatus from politics ===
On 6 March 2021, Farage announced in an interview with The Telegraph that he was retiring from politics and resigning as leader of Reform UK, although he intended to continue "influencing the debate" through social media. He became the party's honorary president and was replaced as the party's leader by Richard Tice. In July 2021, Farage criticised the Royal National Lifeboat Institution, accusing them of being a "taxi service" for illegal immigrants. This provoked a major public backlash – donations to the service rose 3000% in the wake of the remarks and a fundraiser on GoFundMe raised over £120,000 to purchase a new rescue hovercraft for the charity with a suggestion the boat be christened The Flying Farage. In November 2021, Farage published an op-ed in The Daily Telegraph contemplating a return to frontline politics, due to the English Channel migrant crossings and what he perceived as the Prime Minister's indifference to the issue.

Farage launched the Vote Power Not Poverty campaign to secure a referendum on Johnson's government's pledge to achieve net zero carbon emissions by 2050.

In May 2023, Farage told BBC Newsnight that Brexit had failed due to the policies of successive Conservative governments, saying that their policies meant that the UK did not benefit economically from leaving the bloc.

In September 2023, Farage was ranked first on the New Statesman's Right Power List, describing him as "the most influential person on the British right". In February 2024, Farage said that he was "open-minded" about joining the Conservative Party after the general election, more than 30 years after he left the party.

In November 2024, Farage was not invited to speak at a farmers' protest outside Downing Street, with organisers citing concerns that his involvement could politicise the event, particularly in light of Brexit's impact on agriculture. While some close to Farage claimed political pressure from the Conservative Party, the organisers stressed the protest was focused on farmers' issues, such as controversial inheritance tax changes. Farage voiced support on social media, but many farmers opposed his presence, believing it would detract from their cause.

== Second term (2024-) ==
=== Leader of Reform ===
At a news conference on 3 June 2024, Farage announced both his intention to become leader of Reform UK once again and his candidature for the party in the Clacton constituency. He previously said he would not stand in the election, but changed his mind after people had asked him to run.

On his first day of campaigning in Clacton-on-Sea, Farage had a banana milkshake thrown over him by a member of the crowd. A 25-year-old woman was arrested on suspicion of assault. Farage appeared to make a joke about the incident later in the day, when he appeared in front of the media in the village of Jaywick with a tray of milkshakes. On 12 June, Farage had a paper cup and an unidentified object thrown at him whilst campaigning on an open-top bus. A 28-year-old man was arrested on suspicion of public order offences. Farage said that he would not be cowed by the incident. He was subsequently provided with private security.

==== Member of Parliament (2024–2026) ====
On 4 July 2024, Farage won the Clacton seat, with 46.2% of the vote, becoming an MP for the first time.

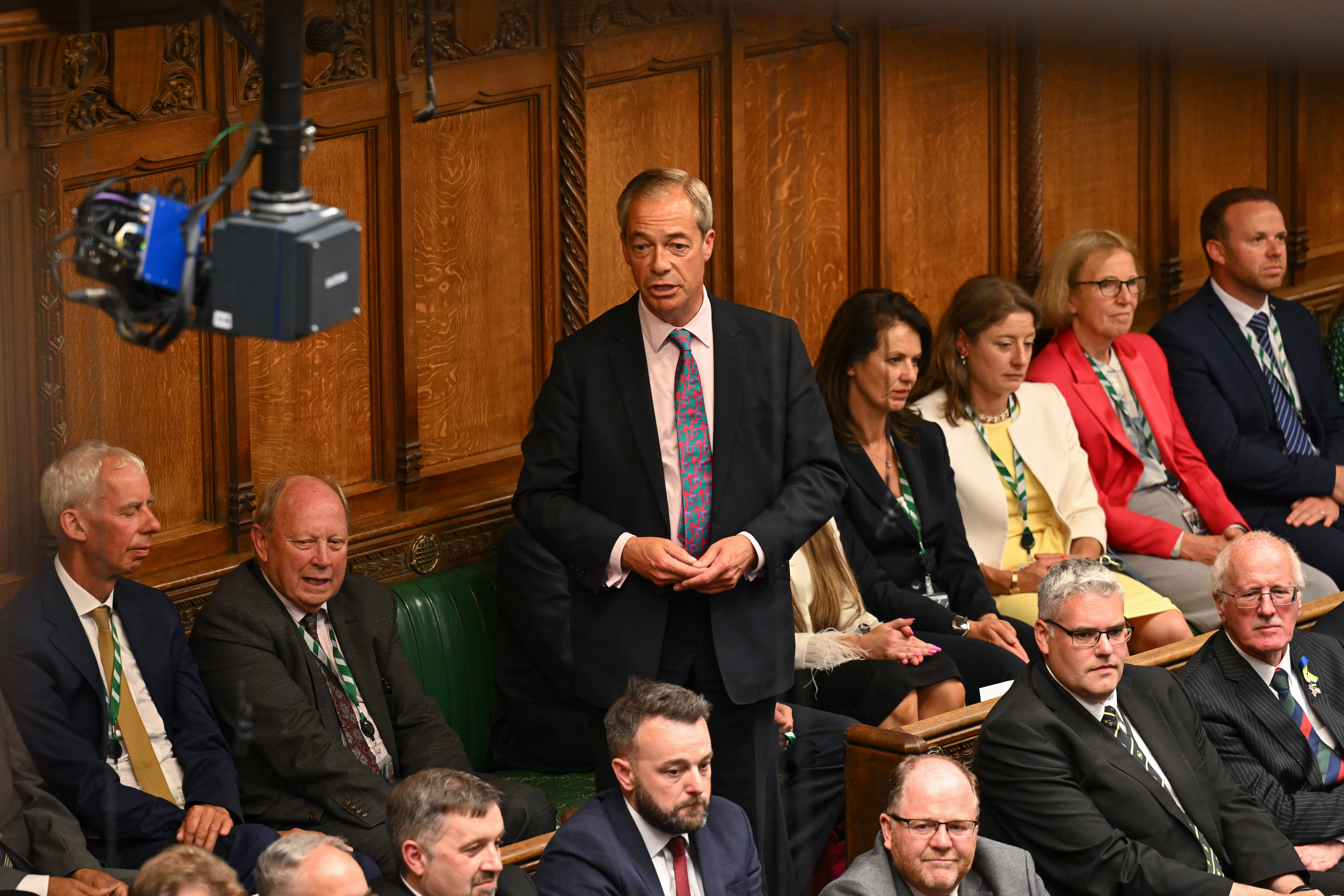
Farage speaking in the House of Commons, 9 July 2024

Amid riots in July and August 2024 following a mass stabbing in Southport, Farage condemned the disorder, stating: "The levels of intimidation and threat to life have no place in a functioning democracy". He called for Parliament to be recalled over the riots and suggested there was a widespread impression of "two-tier policing" as a result of "soft policing" during Black Lives Matter protests, which he said contributed to a "sense of injustice".

Farage was criticised by the former head of UK counter-terrorism, Neil Basu, for questioning whether the truth was being withheld from the public, with Basu accusing Farage of inciting violence and creating conspiracy theories. Farage was also accused by Steve Rotheram, the Mayor of Liverpool City Region, of giving legitimacy to acts of violence, after releasing a video in which he said he did not support violence, but that the protests were "nothing to what could happen over the course of the next few weeks".

Following revised November 2024 data showing net immigration to the United Kingdom reached a record 906,000 for the year ending June 2023, Farage described the figures as "horrendous," stating he had had "enough of being lied to" by the Conservatives and suggested the situation would be "even worse" under Labour.

In January 2025, Farage was the guest of honour at the launch of a climate denying lobby group, which was also attended by former UK prime minister, Liz Truss and Conservative Party shadow minister, Andrew Griffith.

In March 2025, in an interview with the Daily Mail, Reform MP Rupert Lowe criticised the governance of Reform UK as "a protest party led by the Messiah", suggesting he might leave the party if things did not change, and saying it was too early to tell if Nigel Farage would make a good prime minister. Farage disputed Lowe's criticism of himself and Reform UK, describing his personal following as a good thing, and went on to suggest Lowe's remarks were driven by a desire to be Prime Minister himself.

In April 2025, The Independent reported that Farage travelled to Kuala Lumpur, where he was paid £40,000 to deliver a speech for an event hosted by Nomad Capitalist; a company that helps the super-rich to move to other countries to reduce their tax bills.

On 3 September 2025, he travelled to the US and testified before the Republican-led House judiciary committee about the state of free speech in the UK; he criticised British hate speech laws and the implementation of the Online Safety Act 2023, likening Starmer's government to the North Korean regime.

In September 2025, Farage suggested that swans from Royal Parks were being eaten and that carp were being taken out of ponds by eastern European migrants.

In February 2026, protesters travelled to the Chagos Archipelago, their former homeland, aiming to permanently settle in the UK territory and complicate plans to cede the islands to Mauritius. Farage flew to the nearby Maldives intending to travel aboard a yacht that was due to resupply them on Île du Coin. Ultimately, instead of boarding the boat, he said that the British and Maldives governments had blocked him from participating in a "humanitarian mission". The Telegraph reported that the prospect of Farage's presence had put the resupply voyage in doubt, and Farage said that he did not "want [his] presence to jeopardise that". Farage said he was exploring legal avenues to support the activists' cause. Speaking in London, Farage subsequently noted that they had been placed in peril of imprisonment because the Foreign Office considers it illegal to enter the territory without a valid permit, and had served them with eviction orders. Reform UK declined to state whether Farage had himself sought the permit required for legal entry.

Farage said in June 2026 that politicians had created "a backdoor for anti-white discrimination" and that Reform UK would ban foreign nationals from living in social housing. He said that a Reform government would limit schools to celebrating "accepted civic events" and that "pupils should not be forced to celebrate Black History Month, Pride Month and Refugee Week".

In June 2026, Farage declared in the list of MPs' interests that he had been paid £270,000 for advertising gold bullion for four hours work a month over three months.

== See also ==
- Richard Tice
- Reform
