= Legal constitution =

A legal constitution is a constitution where the judiciary form the greatest check upon the use of executive power. A legal constitution can be contrasted with a political constitution where political accountability is the greatest method of controlling government. In a legal constitution, methods of official review and the striking down of unconstitutional legislation may be used in order to control government power. Whether a move from a political to a legal constitution has occurred in the United Kingdom after the passing of the Human Rights Act has been debated by scholars, including Richard Paul Bellamy.

== See also ==
- Liberal legalism
- Rigid constitution
