= Sugar Dome =

- Genre: Reality; Competition
- Presented by: David Bull
- Judges: Paulette Goto; Pichet Ong
- Country of origin: United States
- Original language: English
- No. of seasons: 1
- No. of episodes: 6

Production
- Running time: 41 minutes (excluding commercials)
- Production company: Super Delicious

Original release
- Network: Food Network
- Release: November 25, 2012

Sugar Dome is an American reality-competition series on the Food Network. The series debuted on November 25, 2012. The series showcases three teams of culinary artists as they compete by creating extravagant food for the ultimate chance to be rewarded with $15,000.

== Cast ==
- David Bull as host
- Paulette Goto as a judge
- Pichet Ong as a judge

== Episodes ==
No.	Title	Original release date	U.S. viewers (millions)
1	"A Dragon's Tale"	November 25, 2012	0.896
2	"The Wonderful World of Dr. Seuss"	December 2, 2012	0.913
3	"Rock Star Concert"	December 9, 2012	0.819
4	"When Toy Stores Come to Life at Night"	December 16, 2012	0.828
5	"Ultimate Gladiator Showdown"	December 23, 2012	0.875
6	"We're Off to See the Wizard"	December 30, 2012	1.014
7	"Dangers of the Deep"	January 13, 2013	0.791
8	"Daredevil Stunts"	January 20, 2013	N/A
9	"Cops and Robbers"	January 27, 2013	N/A
10	"Alien Invasion"	February 10, 2013	N/A
11	"Extreme Amusement Park Rides"	February 17, 2013	N/A
12	"Video Game World"	February 24, 2013	N/A
