= Angus MacIntyre (British politician) =

British former military officer and Reform UK spokesperson

Reform UK Spokesperson for Armed Forces
- Incumbent
- Assumed office 5 November 2026
- Leader: Nigel Farage

Personal details
- Party: Reform UK
- Education: University of Exeter (MA)
- Occupation: Political spokesperson
- Profession: Military officer

Military service
- Allegiance: United Kingdom
- Branch/service: British Army; Royal Air Force
- Years of service: 1986–2026
- Rank: Wing commander
- Unit: 17th/21st Lancers; Argyll and Sutherland Highlanders; RAF Regiment

Angus MacIntyre is a British former military officer who became Reform UK's spokesperson for the armed forces in November 2026. He served in the British Army and the Royal Air Force during a 40-year military career, reaching the rank of wing commander.

== Military career ==
MacIntyre began his military career in 1986, serving with the 17th/21st Lancers before being commissioned into the 1st Battalion, Argyll and Sutherland Highlanders. His Army service included attachments to the Royal Marines and the Parachute Regiment, and deployments to Norway, Northern Ireland and Brunei.

He transferred to the RAF Regiment in 1999. His subsequent operational tours included Afghanistan, Kuwait, Sierra Leone, Liberia, Iraq and Somalia. He also served with the United Nations in Somalia and spent a year at the Pentagon as a strategic planner.

In 2018, he was a desk officer in Military Strategic Effects within the Operations Directorate. He later worked at NATO headquarters in Brussels on support for Ukraine following the Russian invasion of Ukraine in 2022.

MacIntyre left military service in October 2026.

== Education and association work ==
MacIntyre earned an MA in Applied Security Strategy at the University of Exeter's Strategy and Security Institute and was a Chief of the Air Staff's Fellow. His dissertation examined declining British influence in Africa.

In March 2024, RAF News identified him as chairman of the RAF Commando Association. In that role, he encouraged female RAF personnel to undertake commando training.

== Political career ==
On 5 November 2026, Reform UK announced MacIntyre's appointment as its spokesperson for the armed forces, describing the position as its "shadow armed forces minister". MacIntyre said that he had left the military to join the party after Nigel Farage appealed for recruits with experience outside politics.

At his unveiling, MacIntyre pledged to resign if a Reform government failed to fulfil its commitment to end what he described as "unjust prosecutions" of veterans within its first 100 days in office. The party said its proposals included ending prosecutions relating to service during the Troubles and introducing restrictions on prosecutions arising from other sanctioned military operations.

In an interview with The Telegraph, he advocated a continued American commitment to NATO and criticised the prosecution of veterans over their conduct on military operations.
