= Great British Political Action Committee =

Political campaign group in the United Kingdom

The Great British Political Action Committee (Great British PAC) is a political campaign group in the United Kingdom, which describes itself as a cross-party organisation and is based on the model of political action committees in the United States. It was founded in September 2024 by Claire Bullivant, with the aim of uniting the British right ahead of the next United Kingdom general election. The Financial Times has referred to the group as "a rightwing political organisation with links to Reform, Restore and other far-right figures". The Guardian has referred to it as a "hard-right lobby group". It has been described in the Belfast Telegraph as a "far-right umbrella group".

The organisation is chaired by Ben Habib, who is a former Deputy Leader of Reform UK. In July 2026, Habib deregistered the far-right political party Advance UK, which he had led, and merged it into Great British PAC. Members of the group's advisory board include Conservative peers Daniel Hannan and Stephen Greenhalgh, YouTuber Carl Benjamin, former Conservative MPs David Jones and Brendan Clarke-Smith, and chair of Republicans Overseas UK, Greg Swenson. Jim Allister, the leader of Traditional Unionist Voice and MP for North Antrim, serves as the group's "Northern Ireland envoy". The group's director in England is Edward Oakenfull. Its director Scotland is Ronni McMenemy.

The group has campaigned against the UK government's Chagos Islands deal and has alleged that the government has been engaged in covert deals to return the Elgin Marbles to Greece. According to a report in The Observer, the group is "behind Reform’s of banning non-British flags from public buildings – although Bullivant is keen to stress the group did not suggest banning the Ukraine flag".

An investigation in July 2025 by Hope not Hate alleged that 13 members of the Great British PAC had promoted far-right, racist and extremist views and conspiracy theories, including one who shared pro-Adolf Hitler and antisemitic content. In a statement to The Guardian, Bullivant called the accusations a "smear campaign". Its director in England, Edward Oakenfull, once wrote on the social network X that sub-Saharan Africans were diluting the UK's "gene pool", stating that "By importing loads of sub Saharan Africans plus Muslims that inter breed the IQ is in severe decline". Oakenfull subsequently said the comments had been taken out of context and were made during a discussion on a book.

According to reporting by The Ferret, its director in Scotland Ronni McMenemy "is an anti-Islam campaigner who said everyone must 'pick a side' between 'good and evil'" and stated in 2025 that "Islam must be removed from the west". Bullivant told The Ferret that Great British PAC "unequivocally rejects racism, antisemitism, religious hatred and political violence". She said that the reporter had cited "a considerable number of comments allegedly made by various individuals on personal social media accounts, in instances before their involvement with the Great British PAC. Individuals are responsible for their own personal comments unless they are expressly speaking on behalf of our organisation."
