= Lee Anderson =

British politician and television presenter (born 1967)

Lee Anderson MP
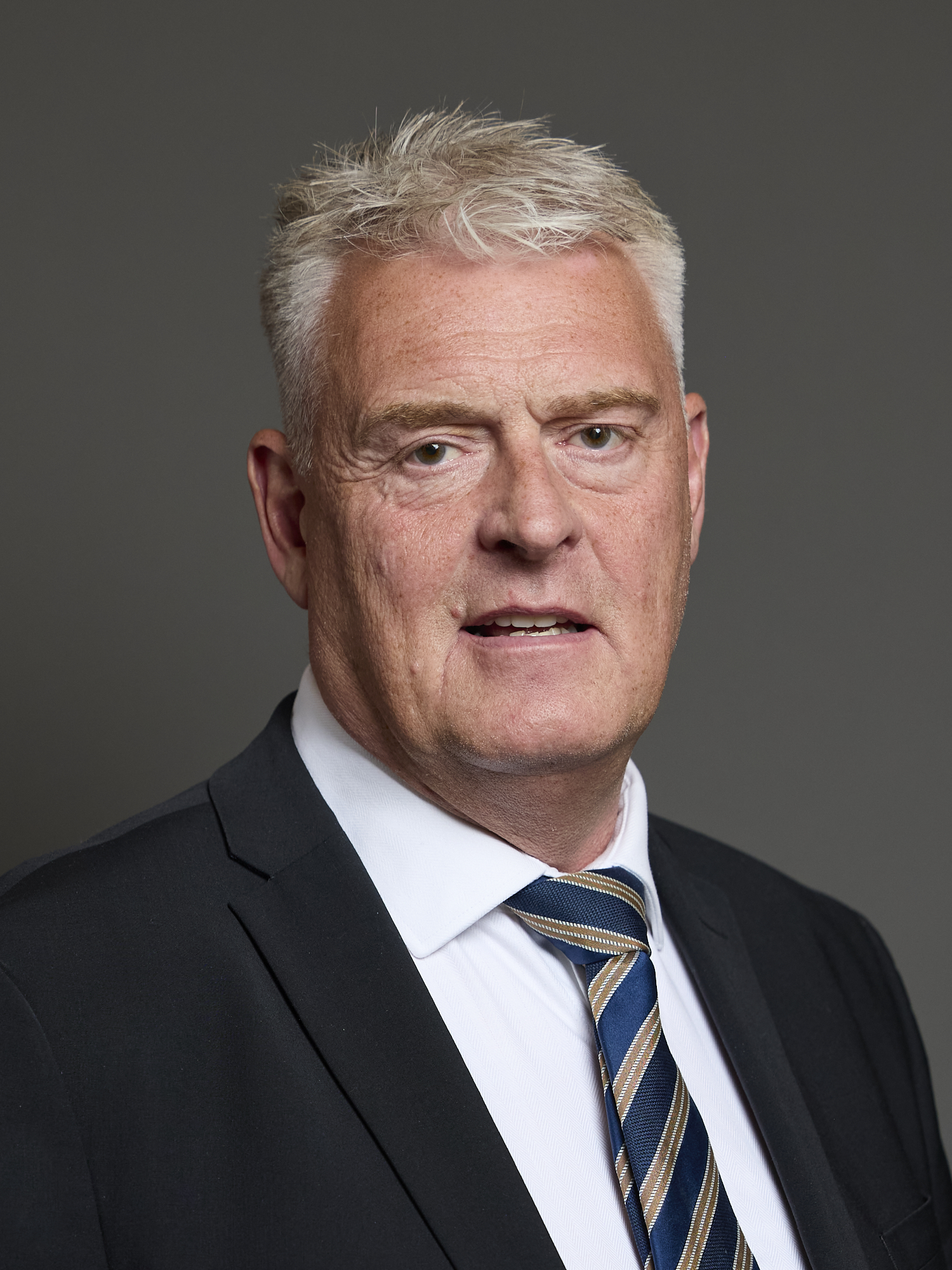
- Official portrait, 2024

Chairman of Reform UK
- Incumbent
- Assumed office 18 May 2026
- Deputy: Paul Nuttall
- Leader: Nigel Farage
- Preceded by: David Bull

Chief Whip of Reform UK in the House of Commons
- Incumbent
- Assumed office 11 July 2024
- Leader: Nigel Farage
- Preceded by: Position established

Deputy Chairman of the Conservative Party
- In office 7 February 2023 – 16 January 2024
- Leader: Rishi Sunak
- Preceded by: Matt Vickers
- Succeeded by: James Daly

Member of Parliament for Ashfield
- Incumbent
- Assumed office 12 December 2019
- Preceded by: Gloria De Piero
- Majority: 5,509 (13.8%)

Personal details
- Born: 6 January 1967 (age 59) Sutton-in-Ashfield, Nottinghamshire, England
- Party: Reform UK (2024–present)
- Other political affiliations: Labour (1983–2018); Conservative (2018–2024); Independent (2018, 2024)
- Spouse: Sinead Anderson
- Children: 2
- Occupation: Politician; TV presenter

Lee Anderson (born 6 January 1967) is a British politician and television presenter who has served as the member of Parliament (MP) for Ashfield since 2019. A member of Reform UK, he has served as its Chief Whip since July 2024, and its Chairman since 2026. Anderson was elected in 2019 as a member of the Conservative Party, but defected to Reform UK in March 2024 after having the whip suspended. He became the party's first MP, and was subsequently elected for Reform UK at the 2024 general election.

Anderson was a deputy chairman of the Conservative Party under Rishi Sunak from February 2023 to January 2024. He resigned to vote against the government on an amendment relating to the Rwanda asylum plan. In February 2024, he had the Conservative whip suspended after declining to apologise for stating that "Islamists" had "got control" of Sadiq Khan and Keir Starmer.

Before his parliamentary career, Anderson was a coal miner and worked for the Citizens Advice Bureau. He was elected as a Labour Party councillor in the Ashfield District in 2015. Suspended by Labour in 2018, he defected to the Conservative Party later that year and was a Conservative councillor in Mansfield from 2019 to 2021 concurrently with his term as an MP. He was elected for Reform UK at the 2024 general election.

== Early life and career ==
Lee Anderson was born on 6 January 1967, in Kings Mill Hospital Sutton-in-Ashfield, Nottinghamshire. His father Paul was a coal miner, while his mother Jenny worked in a clothing factory. Lee, along with his sisters Lisa and Paula, were brought up in Huthwaite, Nottinghamshire. He attended John Davies Primary School and Ashfield School.

In his youth, Anderson was a member of Arthur Scargill's National Union of Mineworkers and campaigned for the Labour Party's Michael Foot in the 1983 general election. He cites Scargill, Dennis Skinner, and Tony Benn as important influences on his early political beliefs. Anderson worked as a coal miner for ten years from 1986 to 1996, before volunteering with, and eventually working for Citizens Advice for another ten years. Afterwards, he worked in hostels supporting homeless care leavers.

== Early political career ==
Anderson was a long-time member of the Labour Party, and was elected as a Labour councillor in the 2015 Ashfield District Council election, representing Huthwaite and Brierley ward. He was suspended by the local branch of the Labour Party in February 2018 after receiving a community-protection warning by the council for using boulders to block members of the Traveller community from "setting up camp at a site in the area". Anderson defected to the Conservative Party the following month, which he stated was in response to the "takeover" of the Labour Party by the hard left, particularly through the left-wing political organisation Momentum. He was elected as a Conservative councillor on Mansfield District Council, representing the Oakham ward between 2019 and 2021.

== Parliamentary career ==
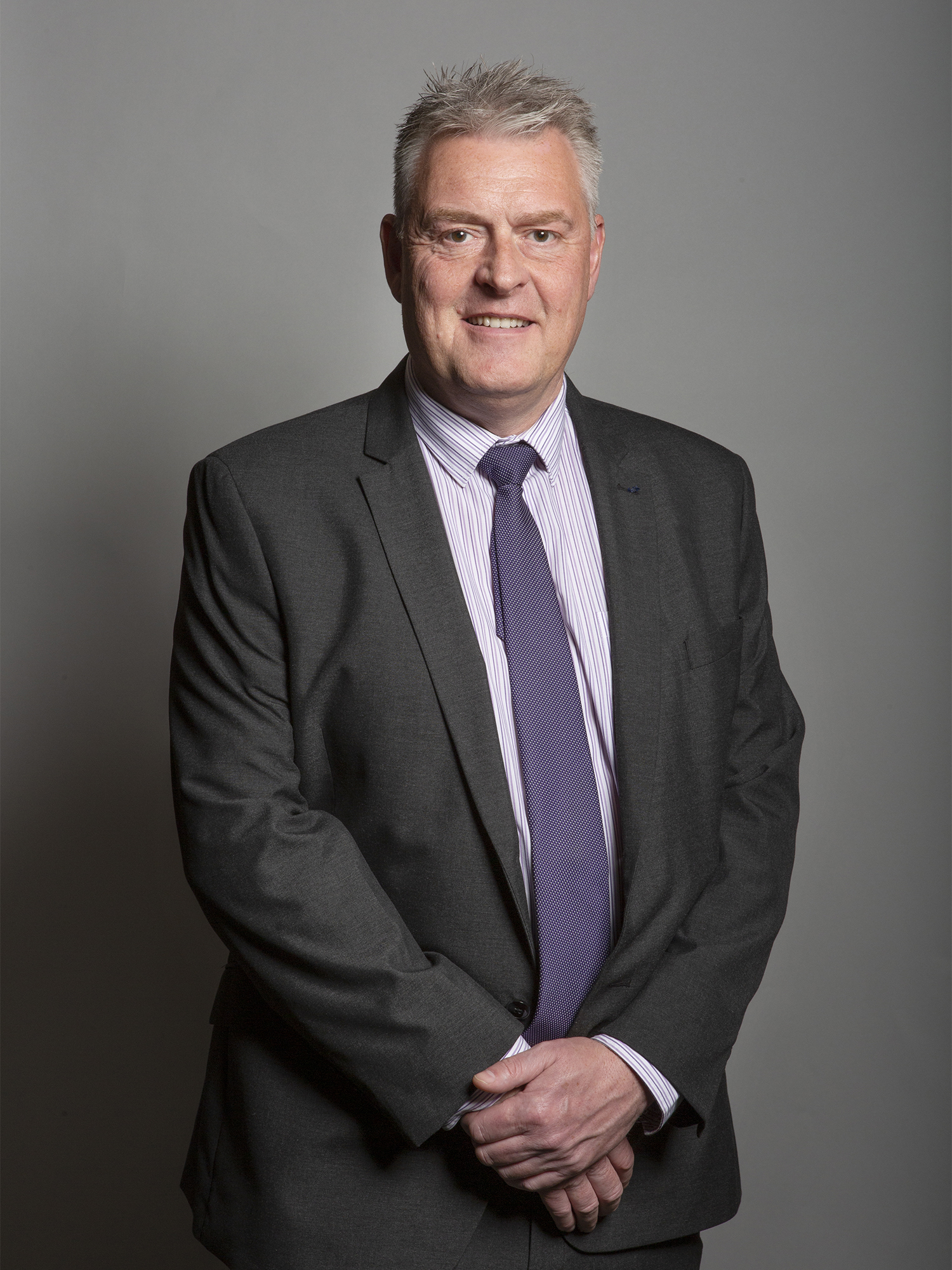
Official portrait, 2019

=== 2019 election campaign ===
In July 2019, Anderson was selected as the Conservative candidate for Ashfield for the 2019 general election. He had supported Brexit in the 2016 UK EU membership referendum. Anderson campaigned on this as well as on education, crime, healthcare, and halving the foreign aid budget.

During the campaign, he was criticised for staging a door knock while he was being filmed for a report by Channel 4 News reporter Michael Crick. Prior to the visit, Anderson was recorded on his microphone instructing a man to "make out you know who I am, that you know I'm the candidate but not that you are a friend". Will Moy of Full Fact said: "Misleading campaign techniques from parties and candidates won't only harm those who are caught out, but could damage voter confidence in our political system." Anderson criticised "nuisance tenants" in a council estate who were "making people's lives a complete misery". He suggested they should be evicted into tents in a field to pick vegetables. The Labour Party criticised Anderson's comments and compared his idea to "forced labour camps".

Anderson was one of three Conservative Party candidates investigated by the party over claims of antisemitism during the election campaign. The investigation was opened on the grounds that he was an active member of a Facebook group in which other members supported Tommy Robinson and promoted George Soros conspiracy theories. The results of the investigation were not made public, but Anderson later attended online training sessions by the Antisemitism Policy Trust charity to improve his understanding of antisemitism. He apologised for being a member of the group, and reported that he had left the group when the initial allegations were made.

Anderson was elected as the MP for Ashfield at the 2019 general election, with a majority of 5,733. The seat had previously been represented by Labour's Gloria De Piero, who stood down at that election. He had previously worked as her office manager for five years. Anderson was the first Conservative to represent the constituency since the 1977 by-election.

Anderson has served on the Home Affairs Select Committee since March 2022 and previously was on the Women and Equalities Committee between June and December 2021. He resigned from the latter role, citing the "time commitment required"; however, other members of the committee commented that he had not attended the majority of the meetings. Anderson had also previously been criticised for sexist comments, including urging a female councillor to "stay out of big boy politics" in November 2021, and a double entendre in July 2018 about a female canvasser's breasts.

=== 2019–2023 ===
Anderson was a member of the Common Sense Group, an informal group of Conservative MPs which formed in the summer of 2020. Following the publication of an interim report on the connections between colonialism and National Trust properties, including links with historic slavery, Anderson was among the signatories of a letter by the group in The Telegraph in November 2020. In the letter, the signatories accused the National Trust of being "coloured by cultural Marxist dogma". In response, the All-Party Parliamentary Group Against Antisemitism issued a briefing paper to all Conservative MPs warning against using the term "cultural Marxism", as it may "inadvertently" act as a "dog-whistle for the far-right". In the same month, Anderson attended a breakfast meeting at Downing Street with Prime Minister Boris Johnson and five other Conservative MPs. He later tested positive for COVID-19, and those who attended subsequently self-isolated.

Anderson announced via social media in June 2021 that he would not watch any England national football team matches during the Euro 2020 tournament in protest at the players' decision to take the knee (a symbolic gesture against racism) before matches. He stated his opposition was because he felt that the action risked "alienating traditional supporters" and it supported Black Lives Matter, which in his opinion was a "political movement whose core principles aim to undermine our very way of life".

The same month, in a debate on the Police, Crime, Sentencing and Courts Bill, Anderson accused the Traveller community in Ashfield of thievery, stating, "the Gypsy encampments that we are talking about in places such as Ashfield are not the traditional, old-fashioned Gypsies sat there playing the mandolin, flogging lucky heather and telling fortunes. The Travellers I am talking about are more likely to be seen leaving your garden shed at 3 o'clock in the morning, probably with your lawnmower and half of your tools. That happens every single time they come to Ashfield".

In November 2021, Anderson voiced his support for offshore processing of asylum applications in the Falkland Islands, and lobbied an immigration minister on the subject. In May 2022, he said that the majority of migrants crossing the English Channel illegally were economic migrants. When told that the Home Office had concluded that the majority were refugees, he blamed the "old failing asylum system", and accused the migrants of lying to falsely seek asylum. In a later interview, in February 2023, Anderson commented, when asked on how he would respond to the small boats migrant crisis: "I'd send them straight back the same day. I'd put them on a Royal Navy frigate or whatever and sail it to Calais, have a standoff. And they'd just stop coming".

Anderson was one of 99 Conservative MPs to vote against COVID-19 passports in England in December 2021. In May 2022, Anderson was criticised by opposition politicians and the food poverty campaigner Jack Monroe for suggesting in parliament that there was not a "massive" need for food banks in the UK, and their use was related to a lack of teaching on budgeting and cooking. Anderson invited opposition MPs to visit a food bank in his constituency, where he said that meals could be cooked for about 30 pence per day, and which also provided a mandatory budgeting and cooking courses, to its users. For these comments, he was given the nickname "30p Lee" by his critics.

The founder of the food bank in Anderson's constituency Ashfield, Simon Martin, commented that the courses were optional, and stated that "people do know how to cook, obviously, because people have been eating and surviving before we've been intervening with food parcels", but that providing free guidance on economic cooking may help. The 30p figure came from a batch-cooking session made by a team led by a professional chef, which stretched an initial £50.24 shop into 172 meals. Martin commented, "It illustrates the point you can produce healthy meals [cheaply] but it's not in the capacity of every family, and not easy to replicate in every household. It presupposes you're buying in bulk, cooking with big catering trays and have the storage". Anderson later stated via social media that his comments had been misinterpreted. He said: "I did not say poor people can't cook or there is no need for food banks."

Monroe hinted at legal action against Anderson, after he commented in an interview that "She's taking money off some of the most vulnerable people in society and making an absolute fortune on the back of people". Monroe later instructed lawyers to start a claim against Anderson. The following month, Anderson said that Johnson was the victim of "a witch hunt led by the BBC", shortly after the results of a Conservative vote of confidence in Johnson's leadership was announced. In July 2022, Anderson withdrew his support for Johnson over his handling of the Chris Pincher scandal. Anderson backed Kemi Badenoch during the July 2022 Conservative Party leadership election. After Badenoch was eliminated, he supported Liz Truss, who was ultimately successful.

In October 2022, Anderson replaced Esther McVey as chair of the Blue Collar Conservative caucus. After becoming chair, he called for the party to focus on policing and immigration policies, and lowering taxes. He was criticised by Labour MP Chris Bryant for making alleged transphobic comments about the comedian Eddie Izzard in an interview in October 2022, and Ashfield Independent Councillor David Hennigan reported Anderson to the Metropolitan Police. The Met commented that it would take no further action, as "no offences had been identified". Anderson described Hennigan's report as a "waste of police time".

Anderson was appointed as Deputy Chairman of the Conservative Party in February 2023. In an interview with The Spectator before his appointment, Anderson said he would support the return of capital punishment, where the perpetrators are clearly identifiable. Prime Minister Rishi Sunak said neither he nor the government shared Anderson's stance. Also in February 2023, The Guardian reported that Michael Hollis, who runs a food bank charity, was pursuing a libel claim against Anderson. Hollis alleged that Anderson accused him in a Facebook post of exchanging cash in brown envelopes over a planning application. In February 2024 the case was dropped.

In August 2023, Anderson commented that any asylum seekers who disliked being housed in barges such as the Bibby Stockholm "should fuck off back to France". Opposition politicians and advocacy group Hope not Hate criticised his comments. Justice Secretary Alex Chalk voiced his support for Anderson on behalf of the government, stating that although his language was "salty", his "indignation is well placed" and "not bigotry at all". Anderson later said that his comments had been misinterpreted as they only referred to "illegal migrants" and not "genuine asylum seekers".

In November 2023, after the Supreme Court declared the policy of sending the asylum seekers to Rwanda was illegal, Anderson said the government should "ignore the law" and send them to Rwanda anyway: "We should just get the planes in the air right now". Also in November 2023, The Sunday Times reported that Anderson had stated he had been offered "a lot of money" by "a political party that begins with an R" to join that party. Richard Tice of Reform UK denied that his party had been involved in any such offer.

=== 2024–present ===
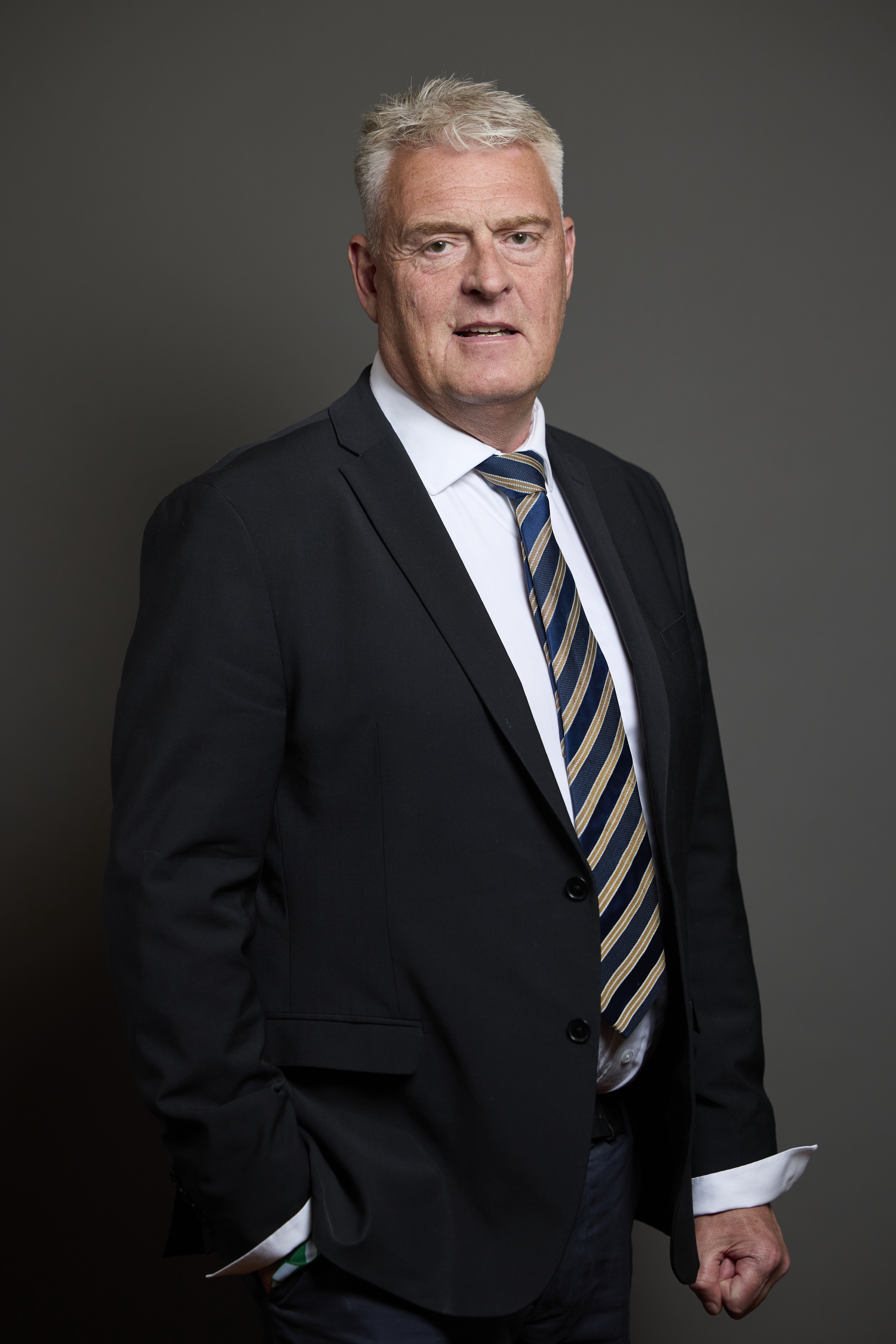
Official portrait, 2024

In January 2024, Anderson resigned, along with Brendan Clarke-Smith, as Deputy Chairman of the Conservative Party, in order to vote for an amendment on the Safety of Rwanda (Asylum and Immigration) Bill. The amendment, put forward by Bill Cash, would "ensure UK and international law could not be used to prevent or delay a person being removed to Rwanda."

==== Suspension of Conservative whip ====
On 24 February 2024, Anderson had the Conservative parliamentary whip suspended for his unwillingness to apologise for comments in a GB News discussion on an article by former Home Secretary Suella Braverman where she had stated that "The truth is that the Islamists, the extremists and the antisemites are in charge now". Anderson alleged that "Islamists" controlled London, its Mayor Sadiq Khan, and the Labour Party leader Keir Starmer, saying: "I don't actually believe that the Islamists have got control of our country, but what I do believe is they've got control of Khan and they've got control of London, and they've got control of Starmer as well." GB News issued a statement on 26 February, which had been drafted by Anderson two days earlier in which he declined to apologise for his comments but said that his "words may have been clumsy but... were borne out of sheer frustration at what is happening to our beautiful capital city."

Anderson was criticised by Labour and some Conservative Party politicians, including former Chancellor of the Exchequer Sajid Javid, and the party's leader in the London Assembly, Neil Garratt. Prime Minister Rishi Sunak stated that Anderson's comments were "wrong, unacceptable and ill-judged" but he did not believe he was "racist or Islamophobic". Following his suspension, Anderson did not rule out defecting to Reform UK; he had a private meeting with its leader Richard Tice on 25 February.

==== Defection to Reform UK ====
On 11 March 2024, Anderson joined Reform UK, becoming the party's first Member of Parliament. Anderson had previously been critical of Reform UK, saying it was "not a proper political party" and describing its leader Tice as a "pound shop Farage". At the 2024 general election, Anderson was re-elected to Parliament as MP for Ashfield with an increased vote share of 42.8% and a decreased majority of 5,509. Along with Anderson, Nigel Farage, Rupert Lowe, James McMurdock, and Richard Tice were elected for Reform. After the election, he was made Chief Whip of Reform UK. Following an investigation by the parliamentary Independent Expert Panel, in November 2024, Anderson apologised for swearing at a parliamentary security officer and behaving in a way that "constituted bullying, and also harassment" on 23 November 2023, before he joined Reform. Initially he denied the allegations, but after a failed appeal he accepted the findings in full and made a full apology.

In January 2025, Anderson voted along with all other Reform UK MPs for a new national inquiry into rape gangs. Reform UK was the only party to vote in unison. The bill was lost at 364 votes to 111, a majority of 253, against the amendment. On 7 March 2025, Anderson suspended the whip of fellow Reform UK MP Rupert Lowe over legal accusations. Anderson said to remove the whip was "a deeply painful thing to do."

During the 2024 United Kingdom riots, which involved racist attacks, arson, looting, and attacks on hotels housing asylum seekers, Anderson alleged on social media that a hotel in his constituency was housing people who had entered the country illegally. He subsequently issued a correction after it was revealed the hotel was hosting international NHS nurses. Anderson later described rioters as "just young idiots who got carried away."

On 29 October 2025, Anderson said that before entering politics while working at the Citizens Advice Bureau, he was part of an organisation which was "gaming the system". He said he knew advisers at the organisation who could get "the fittest man in Ashfield" on Personal Independence Payment (PIP). The Reform UK policy on welfare is to stop people "exploiting the system" and to cease providing PIP payments to recipients with "non-major anxiety".

In February 2026, Nigel Farage announced his first frontbench team. Anderson remained Chief Whip, and was not appointed to a spokesman role for any particular portfolio. On 20 April 2026, Anderson was ejected from a Commons debate about the Peter Mandelson scandal for calling Keir Starmer a liar, a statement he refused to withdraw when instructed to do so by the Speaker.

== Television ==
GB News announced in March 2023 that Anderson would host a show on the channel on a £100,000 salary, whilst also working full time as the MP for Ashfield. He had previously criticised other MPs having second jobs in November 2021, following the Owen Paterson lobbying scandal. Anderson started hosting his weekly show Lee Anderson's Real World in June 2023. He was criticised in the same month by the Serjeant at Arms, the official responsible for maintaining order in the House of Commons, for using the parliamentary rooftop to film a promotion video for the show.

== Personal life ==
Anderson is married to Sinead, a Conservative councillor on Mansfield District Council who represented the Eakring ward between 2019 and 2023 and then the Thompsons ward from 2023. She was suspended from the Conservative Party in April 2024, after images posted by Lee Anderson to social media showed her attending Reform UK campaigning activities, but was reinstated the following month. She has cystic fibrosis, and has received a double lung transplant for the condition. He also has two sons from a previous marriage. Anderson was a single parent for seventeen years and, at one point, sold his car to make ends meet. At the age of 36 he was treated for testicular cancer.

Parliament of the United Kingdom
| Preceded by Gloria De Piero | Member of Parliament for Ashfield; 2019–present | Incumbent |
Party political offices
| New title | Reform UK Chief Whip of the House of Commons; 2024–present | Incumbent |
