= David Bull (politician) =

Chairman of Reform UK (born 1969)

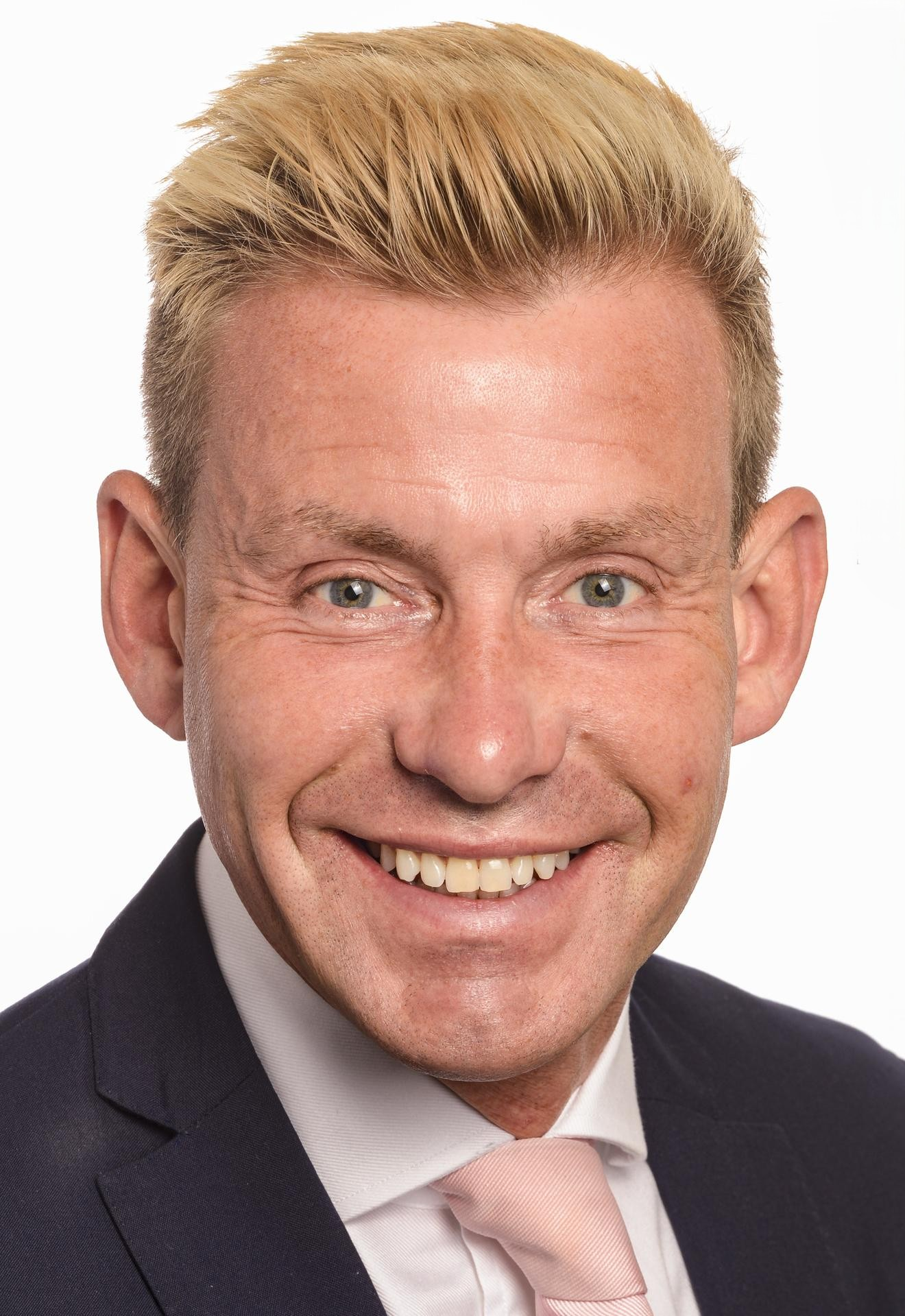
- Official portrait, 2019

Chairman of Reform UK
- In office 10 June 2025 – 18 May 2026
- Deputy: Paul Nuttall
- Leader: Nigel Farage
- Preceded by: Zia Yusuf
- Succeeded by: Lee Anderson

Deputy Leader of Reform UK
- In office 11 March 2021 – 11 July 2024 Serving with Ben Habib (2023–2024)
- Leader: Richard Tice; Nigel Farage
- Preceded by: Position established
- Succeeded by: Richard Tice

Member of the European Parliament for North West England
- In office 2 July 2019 – 31 January 2020
- Leader: Richard Tice; Nigel Farage
- Preceded by: Steven Woolfe
- Succeeded by: Constituency abolished

Personal details
- Born: David Richard Bull; 9 May 1969 (age 57) Farnborough, London, England, UK
- Party: Reform UK (since 2019)
- Other political affiliations: Conservative (before 2019)
- Education: Imperial College London (MBBS)
- Occupation: Television presenter; author; politician
- Website: davidbull.com

David Richard Bull (born 9 May 1969) is an English television presenter, politician, and former medical doctor who was Chairman of Reform UK from 10 June 2025 to 18 May 2026. He also formerly served as Reform UK's Deputy Leader from 2021 to 2023 and as Co-Deputy Leader, alongside Ben Habib, from 2023 to 2024. He was previously a Member of the European Parliament (MEP) for North West England from 2019 to 2020.

Bull worked as a house officer and then senior house officer at St Mary's Hospital, Ealing Hospital, and Whittington Hospital. He began a career in broadcasting in 1995 and has presented or appeared as a commentator on numerous programmes. As well as appearing on British television, he has presented Sugar Dome and appeared on The Rachael Ray Show in the US.

In 2006, Bull was selected as the Conservative candidate for Brighton Pavilion for the following general election, but stood down in 2009 to head up a Conservative policy review on sexual health. He joined the Brexit Party, later Reform UK, in 2019, and was elected as one of their MEPs for North West England at that year's European Parliament election. He stood down upon the United Kingdom's withdrawal from the EU in January 2020. He became Deputy Leader of Reform UK in March 2021. In 2022, he became a presenter on TalkTV. At the 2024 general election he stood in West Suffolk and came third with 20.8% of the vote. Shortly after the election, he was replaced as deputy leader by Richard Tice.

On 10 June 2025, he was appointed chairman of Reform UK, a position from which he resigned in May 2026.

== Media career ==
In 1995, Bull auditioned to be a guest commentator for The Sky Travel Guide on Sky Travel. Of the auditioning process Bull recalled, "I had to read autocue, I had to interview someone, and I had to handle a live show ... you can't beat that sort of experience." Bull was awarded the position on Sky Travel, giving advice for the holiday health feature to those travelling abroad, and beginning his career as a television commentator and presenter.

Bull joined the long-running children's news programme Newsround as a presenter and producer of segments regarding children's health. Whilst on Newsround, Bull became a regular on Saturday morning programmes for CBBC including The Weather Show, Saturday Aardvark, K Club and Bitesize Debate specials. He also hosted, in his role as a doctor, Why Me? and Call the Doctor. Bull then became the sole presenter of Tell Me About It! for New Zealand's C4 TV station. Aimed at young people, the five-instalment programme tackled issues including eating disorders, parental divorces and teen drug use and alcoholism.

In 1998, Bull published his first book, Cool and Celibate?: Sex and No Sex, arguing the benefits of abstinence in teenagers. Bull followed this with What Every Girl Should Know: An A to Z of Health-From Allergies to Zits! in 1999.

Bull joined the BBC's Watchdog in 1999. While on Watchdog, he also appeared on Holiday, Let's Get Healthy, The Really Useful Show, Daily Live and This Morning. He then hosted Watchdog Healthcheck, a weekly, half-hour health programme running from 2001 to 2002.

Bull also presented the science and technology-centred Tomorrow's World, before presenting Most Haunted on Living TV. Bull appeared on Live TV's highest rated series, Most Haunted Live! from October 2002 to October 2005, hosting three-hour instalments that featured paranormal investigations broadcast live with interactive sections involving the audience. He has also made appearances on The Wright Stuff, The Jeremy Vine Show, The Alan Titchmarsh Show, and Richard & Judy.

Bull made his American television debut in 2010 as a contributor on the daytime talk show The Rachael Ray Show. In 2012, Bull started hosting for Food Network's series Sugar Dome which is broadcast in the US, Canada, Asia and the UK. He has also co-presented Coast vs Country on Channel 4.

In 2013, Bull appeared in the romantic comedy film Cavemen.

In 2019, after he and a number of Brexit Party MEPs appeared on The Richie Allen Show, the anti-racist advocacy group Hope not Hate reported on the far-right and antisemitic contents of the show.

In 2022, Bull joined TalkTV as the co-host of its Weekend Breakfast Show.

== Political career ==
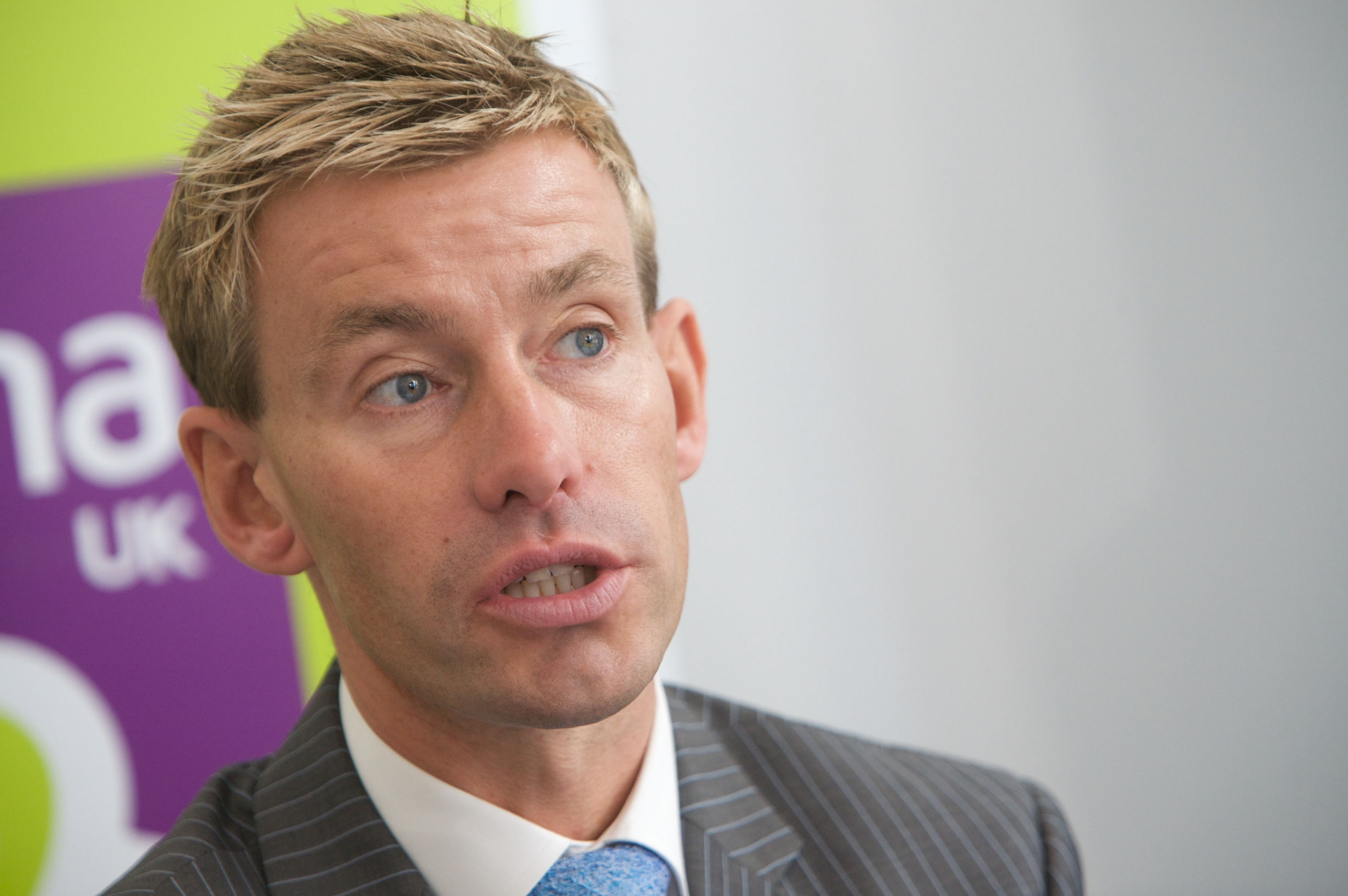
Bull at the 2009 Conservative Party Conference

In December 2006, Bull was selected to fight the parliamentary seat of Brighton Pavilion at the 2010 general election for the Conservative Party, after being placed on the party's A-List earlier that year. He withdrew his candidacy in June 2009 and was replaced by Charlotte Vere. Denying rumours that he quit after falling out with party leadership, Bull cited the increased workload accompanying his recent appointment to head up a Conservative policy review on sexual health with Shadow Health Minister Anne Milton.

In April 2019, Bull was announced as a Brexit Party candidate in the 2019 European Parliament election. He was duly returned as an MEP for the North West England constituency in the election held on 23 May. Later, in August of that year, Bull was adopted as the Brexit Party's prospective parliamentary candidate (PPC) for Central Suffolk and North Ipswich then subsequently Sedgefield in the 2019 general election.

Following the UK's withdrawal from the European Union on 31 January 2020 Bull's term as member of the European Parliament came to an end.

On 11 March 2021, Bull was made deputy leader of Reform UK.

In March 2021, Bull was announced as the Reform UK candidate for the City and East constituency in the 2021 London Assembly election. He came fifth with 9,060 votes (4.1%). Bull was also the second-placed candidate on the additional members list, though neither he nor his party were successful in winning any seats.

In 2024, Bull stood as the Reform UK candidate for the West Suffolk constituency for the UK general election. Bull came in third with 20.3% of the vote, losing to the Conservative candidate, Nick Timothy, and coming behind the Labour Party.

On 10 June 2025, Bull was appointed the Chairman of Reform UK. Bull resigned as chairman of Reform on 18 May 2026 and was replaced by Lee Anderson. A Reform UK press release stated that Bull was stepping down in order to "focus on standing at the next election".

== Business work ==
In 2000, Bull founded a creative branding company, Incredibull. He sold his interest in the business in 2017.

Bull also served as one of three company directors of the company Farage Media Ltd alongside Nigel Farage and Daniel James Jukes from 2020 until his termination from the role on 28 March 2023.

In February 2021, Bull was criticised in an article in PinkNews for promoting sales of HIV testing kits, during HIV Awareness Week, when these kits could be obtained free on the NHS.

== Personal life ==
Bull is gay. In 2007, he appeared at the Brighton Pride parade, for which he designed and wore a T-shirt with the slogan "I've come out... I'm a Tory", saying it was more socially acceptable in the UK to come out as gay than to come out as a Conservative.

== Electoral history ==
=== 2024 general election ===
General election 2024: West Suffolk
Party	Candidate	Votes	%	±%
Conservative	Nick Timothy	15,814	34.3	–30.0
Labour	Rebecca Denness	12,567	27.2	+5.0
Reform	David Bull	9,623	20.8	N/A
Liberal Democrats	Henry Batchelor	4,284	9.3	+0.3
Green	Mark Ereira-Guyer	2,910	6.3	+1.8
Independent	Katie Parker	485	1.1	N/A
Independent	Luke O'Brien	345	0.7	N/A
SDP	Ivan Kinsman	133	0.3	N/A
Majority		3,247	7.1	–35.1
Turnout		46,331	60.1	–4.6
Registered electors		77,149		
Conservative hold		Swing	–17.5	

=== 2021 London Assembly election ===
2021 London Assembly election: City and East
Party	Candidate	Constituency			List		
Party	Candidate	Votes	%	±%	Votes	%	±%
Labour	Unmesh Desai (Note: Incumbent member for this constituency)	125,025	56.7	▼1.1	116,148	53.32	▼4.29
Conservative	Nick Vandyke	46,718	21.2	▲5.8	44,957	20.64	▲6.26
Green	Tim Kiely	25,596	11.6	▲2.7	20,106	9.23	▲2.54
Liberal Democrats	Richard Flowers	14,136	6.4	▲1.4	9,001	4.13	▲0.44
Rejoin EU					4,724	2.17	New
Animal Welfare					3,651	1.68	▲0.86
Women's Equality					3,431	1.58	▼1.12
CPA					2,992	1.37	▲0.11
UKIP					2,734	1.26	▼5.42
Reform	David Bull	9,060	4.1	New	2,459	1.13	New
London Real					2,189	1.00	New
Let London Live					1,649	0.76	New
Heritage					986	0.45	New
Londependence Party					850	0.39	New
Communist					849	0.39	New
TUSC					950	0.43	New
SDP					691	0.32	New
National Liberal					395	0.18	New
Majority		78,307	35.5	▼6.9			
Turnout		220,535					
Labour hold		Swing					

=== 2019 general election ===
General election 2019: Sedgefield
Party	Candidate	Votes	%	±%
Conservative	Paul Howell	19,609	47.2	▲8.4
Labour	Phil Wilson	15,096	36.3	▼17.1
Brexit Party	David Bull	3,518	8.5	N/A
Liberal Democrats	Dawn Welsh	1,955	4.7	▲2.8
Green	John Furness	994	2.4	▲0.7
Independent	Michael Joyce	394	0.9	N/A
Majority		4,513	10.9	N/A
Turnout		41,576	64.6	▼0.5
Registered electors		64,325		
Conservative gain from Labour		Swing	+12.8	

=== 2019 European elections ===
European Election 2019: North West England
List	Candidates	Votes	Of total (%)	± from prev.
Brexit Party	Claire Fox (1) Henrik Overgaard-Nielsen (4) David Bull (7) Gary Harvey, Ajay Jagota, Elizabeth Babade, Sally Bate, John Banks	541,843 (180,614)	31.23	New
Labour	Theresa Griffin (2) Julie Ward (6) Wajid Khan, Erica Lewis, David Brennan, Claire Cozler, Saf Ismail, Yvonne Tennant	380,193 (190,096)	21.91	–11.94
Liberal Democrats	Chris Davies (3) Jane Brophy (8) Helen Foster-Grime, Anna Fryer, Sam Al-Hamdani, Rebecca Forrest, John Studholme, Frederick Van Mierlo	297,507 (148,753)	17.15	+11.14
Green	Gina Dowding (5) Wendy Kay Olsen, Jessica Northey, Geraldine Coggins, Rosie Mills, Astrid Johnson, Daniel Jerrome, James Booth	216,581	12.48	+5.47
Conservative	Sajjad Karim, Kevin Beaty, Jane Howard, Arnold Saunders, Wendy Maisey, Thomas Lord, Anthony Pickles, Attika Choudhary	131,002	7.55	–12.51
UKIP	Adam Richardson, Jeff Armstrong, Fiona Mills, Nathan Ryding, Michael Felse, Ben Fryer, John Booker, Alexander Craig	62,464	3.60	–23.86
Change UK	Andrea Cooper, Dan Price, Arun Banerji, Michael Taylor, Philippa Olive, Victoria Desmond, Andrew Graystone, Elisabeth Knight	47,237	2.72	New
Independent	Tommy Robinson	38,908	2.24	New
English Democrat	Stephen Morris, Valerie Morris	10,045	0.58	–0.53
UKEU	Sophie Larroque	7,125	0.41	New
Independent	Mohammad Aslam	2,002	0.12	New
Turnout		1,744,858	33.11	–0.39

Party political offices
Preceded by Zia Yusuf	Chairman of Reform UK; 10 June 2025 – present	Incumbent
