= Pichet Ong =

Thai chef

- Born: October 28, 1969 (age 56); Bangkok, Thailand
- Education: Yale University, Brandeis University, University of California at Berkeley
- Occupations: Chef; Author; Restaurateur
- Culinary career
- Cooking style: combining culinary traditions, including French, Southeast Asian and Chinese
- Current restaurant(s): Nihao, The Restaurant at Hotel Wailea
- Previous restaurant(s): Jean Georges, Spice Market, Coppélia, Qi, P*ONG, Batch, Brothers and Sisters, Spoken English, Maketto, Q By Peter Chang, Mama Chang, Harbs, Toloache, Max Brenner
- Television show(s): Sugar Dome (Food Network), Top Chef (Bravo), Top Chef: Just Desserts (Bravo), Cake Wars (Food Network), Explained (Netflix), Halloween Wars (Food Network), The Martha Stewart Show (NBCUniversal)

Pichet Ong (Thai: พิเชฏฐ์ องค์วาสิฏฐ์; RTGS: Phichet Ongwasit, born October 28, 1969) is a 5 times James Beard Award nominated chef who specializes in desserts. As a self-taught chef with no formal training Chef Ong is best known for pioneering savory techniques and forgoing the heavy use of sugar in his desserts. Ong mixes classic technique and whimsical culinary style which are inspired by his heritage and local ingredients.

Three times awarded three stars by the New York Times, he made his career breakthrough as pastry chef for Jean-Georges Vongerichten from 1998 to 2004, opening several of Vongerichten's restaurants, including Spice Market. In 2007 he opened P*ONG in New York City, where he applied his sweet and savory approach to cooking across the menu, starting a gastronomic trend that was captured by The New York Times, Elle, O, the Oprah Magazine, Bon Appetit, and Food & Wine. In 2008 he opened a bakery called Batch next door to the restaurant. Both closed in 2009. Also in 2009 Chef Ong opened The Village Tart and Spot Dessert Bar, which was the first dessert only restaurant to be reviewed by The New York Times.

Beginning in 2010 Ong consulted for major international brands including Holland America, Häagen-Dazs, So Sofitel, Salt in Dubai, and Max Brenner in Australia. From 2012 to 2013 he was a judge on the Food Network cooking competition show, Sugar Dome.

In 2015 Ong emerged in the Washington D.C. culinary scene where he opened several celebrated restaurants in the metropolitan area. In 2019 he garnered a double James Beard Award nomination with Best New Restaurant and Outstanding Pastry Chef with his acclaimed cakes. In 2019 Ong collaborated with chef Peter Chang on a modern Chinese restaurant in Baltimore called Nihao where he took the reign as Executive Chef. Nihao landed on many of the year's 'best lists' including the Washington Post and Esquire Magazine.

== Personal life ==
Ong was born in Bangkok to a Thai Chinese father and Singaporean Chinese mother. He was raised in Singapore and Hong Kong for much of his childhood He first came to the United States at the age of 14.

Ong received his undergraduate education at Brandeis University and Yale University. He received a master's degree in architecture at the University of California at Berkeley, where he trained under Stanley Saitowitz.

An accomplished writer and a former recipient of the American Poets Award, Ong published The Sweet Spot in 2007, which made it on several "top" lists including The New York Times and Gourmet.

Pichet Ong is a James Beard Award Finalist in multiple categories, a StarChefs award winner, and has been a guest on Martha Stewart Live and Food Network. He travels worldwide to give demonstrations, is one of the few American guests at Madrid Fusion and Melbourne and Sydney Food & Wine Festival. He has projects worldwide, including Max Brenner, Qi Restaurant, Coppélia, and Switch. In 2018 Ong returned to Bangkok to open restaurants Pad Thai Fai Ta Lu and Table 38 with longtime friend Andy Yang, which received a Michelin Star.

He sits on the boards of California Almond, the Tenement Museum, the Museum of Chinese in America, Asia Society, French Culinary Institute, and Institute of Culinary Education.

His current residence is New York.
