= List of Reform UK MPs =

This is a list of Reform UK MPs. It includes all past and present members of Parliament elected to the British House of Commons representing Reform UK. Members of the European Parliament, the Scottish Parliament, the Senedd, London Assembly and members of local councils are not listed. All Reform UK's MPs have been a Conservative Party member at some point.

== List of current Reform UK MPs ==
Name	Portrait	Constituency	First elected	Became Reform UK MP	Party at election	Notes
Lee Anderson		Ashfield	12 December 2019 (Note: Elected as a Conservative in 2019)	11 March 2024	Reform UK	First Reform UK MP; Chief Whip of Reform UK (2024–present); Chairman of Reform UK (2026–present)
Richard Tice		Boston and Skegness	4 July 2024		Reform UK	Chairman of Reform UK (2019–2021; 2024); Leader of Reform UK (2021–2024); Deputy Leader of Reform UK (2024–present); Business, Trade and Energy Policy spokesperson (2026–present)
Sarah Pochin		Runcorn and Helsby	1 May 2025		Reform UK	First female Reform UK MP; First Reform UK MP to gain their seat through a by-election.
Danny Kruger		East Wiltshire	12 December 2019 (Note: Elected as a Conservative in 2019 and 2024)	15 September 2025	Conservative Party	Political Secretary to the Prime Minister of the United Kingdom (2019); Shadow Minister for Defence (2024); Shadow Minister for Work and Pensions (2024–2025)
Robert Jenrick		Newark	5 June 2014 (Note: Elected as a Conservative in 2014, 2015, 2017, 2019 and 2024)	15 January 2026	Conservative Party	Exchequer Secretary to the Treasury (2018–2019); Secretary of State for Housing, Communities and Local Government (2019–2021); Minister of State for Health and Social Care (2022); Minister of State for Immigration (2022–2023); Shadow Secretary of State for Justice (2024–2026); Shadow Lord Chancellor (2024–2026); Treasury spokesperson (2026–present)
Andrew Rosindell		Romford	7 June 2001 (Note: Elected as a Conservative in 2001, 2005, 2010, 2015, 2017, 2019 and 2024)	18 January 2026	Conservative Party	Shadow Minister for Home Affairs (2007–2010); Shadow Minister for Foreign Affairs (2024–2026)
Suella Braverman		Fareham and Waterlooville	7 May 2015 (Note: Elected as a Conservative in 2015, 2017, 2019 and 2024)	26 January 2026	Conservative Party	Home Secretary (2022–2023); Attorney General for England and Wales; Advocate General for Northern Ireland (2021–2022); Education, Skills and Equality spokesperson (2026–present)
Nigel Farage		Clacton	4 July 2024 – 8 July 2026	4 July 2024	Reform UK	Leader of Reform UK (2019–2021; 2024–present); Honorary President of Reform UK (2021–2024)
Nigel Farage		Clacton	14 August 2026	14 August 2026	Reform UK	Leader of Reform UK (2019–2021; 2024–present); Honorary President of Reform UK (2021–2024)

== List of former Reform UK MPs ==
Name	Portrait	Constituency	First elected	Became Reform UK MP	Left	Term length	Notes
Rupert Lowe		Great Yarmouth	4 July 2024		7 March 2025 (Note: Suspended from the party since 7 March 2025.)	246 days	Initially suspended; later left to form Restore Britain
James McMurdock		South Basildon and East Thurrock	4 July 2024		5 July 2025	1 year, 1 day	Resigned whip pending investigation

== See also ==
- List of Reform UK politicians
- List of Conservative Party defections to Reform UK
