= Coast vs Country =

British property television series

- Directed by: Craig Duncan (Series 1); Freddie-Foss Smith (Series 1); John Shackleton (Series 2)
- Presented by: Kerr Drummond; Sara Damergi; Kirsty Duffy; David Bull
- Composer: Jon Wygens
- Country of origin: United Kingdom
- Original language: English
- No. of series: 5
- No. of episodes: 70

Production
- Running time: 51 minutes
- Production company: Freeform Productions

Original release
- Network: Channel 4
- Release: 14 November 2016 – 16 June 2019

Coast vs Country is a British property television series on Channel 4 presented by Kerr Drummond, Sara Damergi, Kirsty Duffy and David Bull. It has aired from 14 November 2016 to 16 June 2019.
