= Deputy Leader of Reform UK =

Second highest ranking politician in the Reform UK party

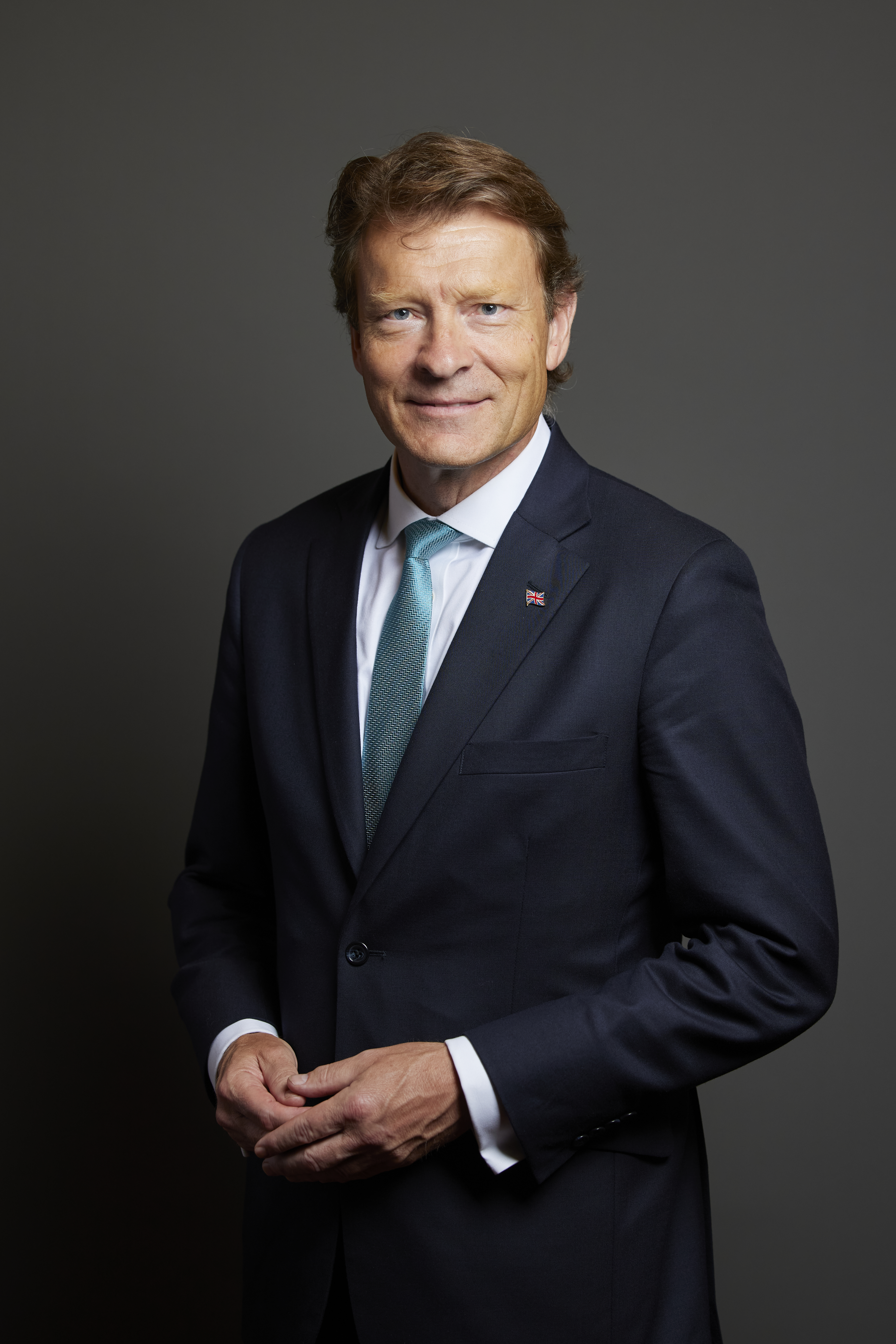
- Incumbent; Richard Tice since 11 July 2024
- Style: Deputy Leader
- Appointer: Leader of Reform UK
- Formation: 11 March 2021
- First holder: David Bull

The Deputy Leader of Reform UK is the second most senior position within Reform UK. Currently, the office is held by Richard Tice, who became deputy leader on 11 July 2024.

The first holder of the role was David Bull who served as Deputy Leader from March 2021 to July 2024 (joint with Ben Habib from October 2023 to July 2024).

== List of Deputy Leaders of Reform UK ==
#	Leader	Portrait	Took office	Left office	Duration	Spokesperson role	Leader
1	David Bull (1969–)		11 March 2021	11 July 2024	3 years, 123 days	Health	Tice
2	Ben Habib (1965–)		7 October 2023	11 July 2024	279 days	Brexit and the Union	Tice
3	Richard Tice (1964–)		11 July 2024	Incumbent	2 years, 121 days	Business, Trade and Energy	Farage
3	Richard Tice (1964–)		11 July 2024	Incumbent	2 years, 121 days	Foreign Policy	Farage

== See also ==
- Frontbench team of Nigel Farage
- Leader of Reform UK
- Chairman of Reform UK
- Chief Whip of Reform UK
- List of Reform UK MPs
- Reform UK
