= Chairman of Reform UK =

Political party leader

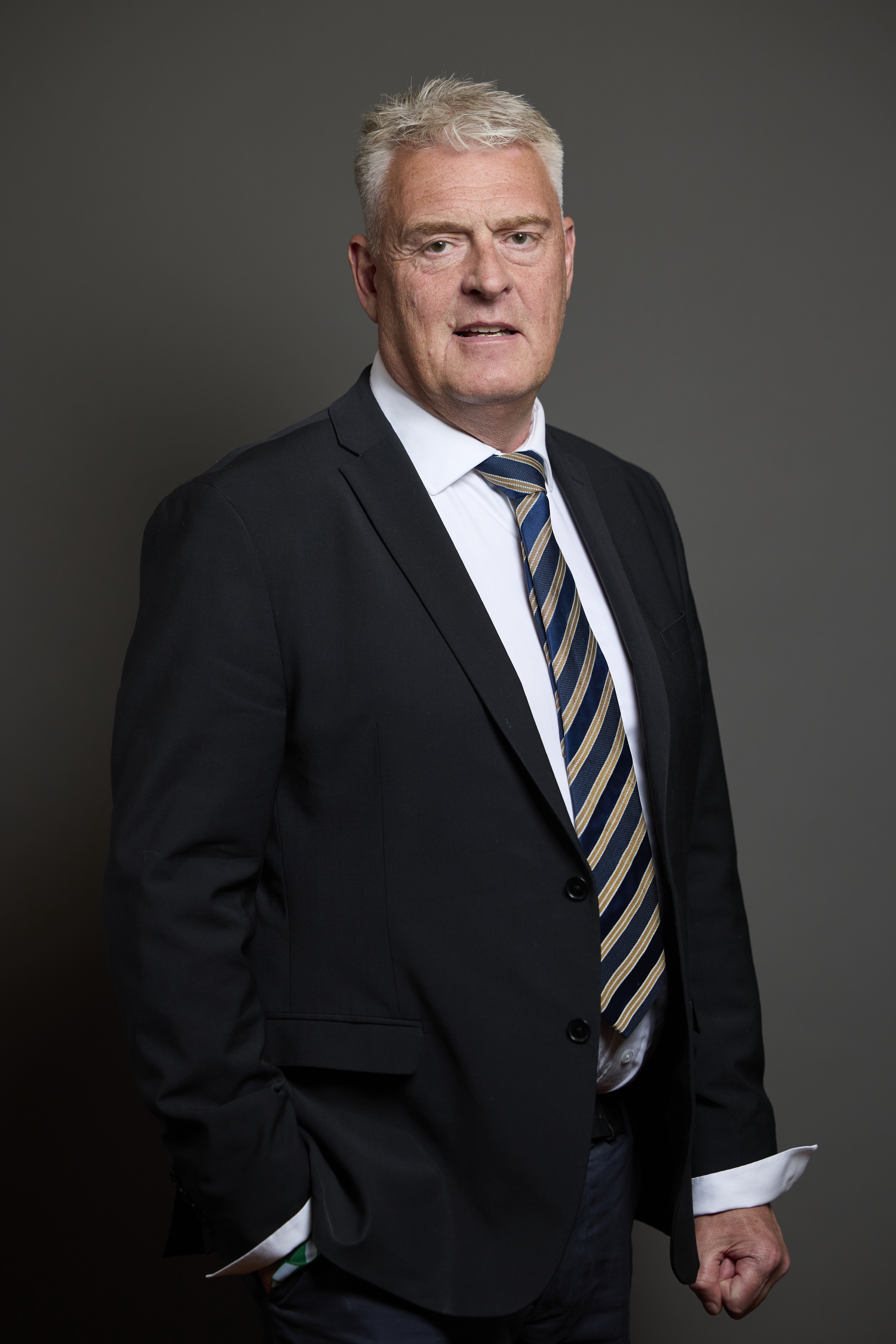
- Incumbent; Lee Anderson since 18 May 2026
- Style: Party Chair (informal)
- Appointer: Leader of Reform UK
- Term length: At the pleasure of the leader of Reform UK
- Formation: 2019
- First holder: Richard Tice

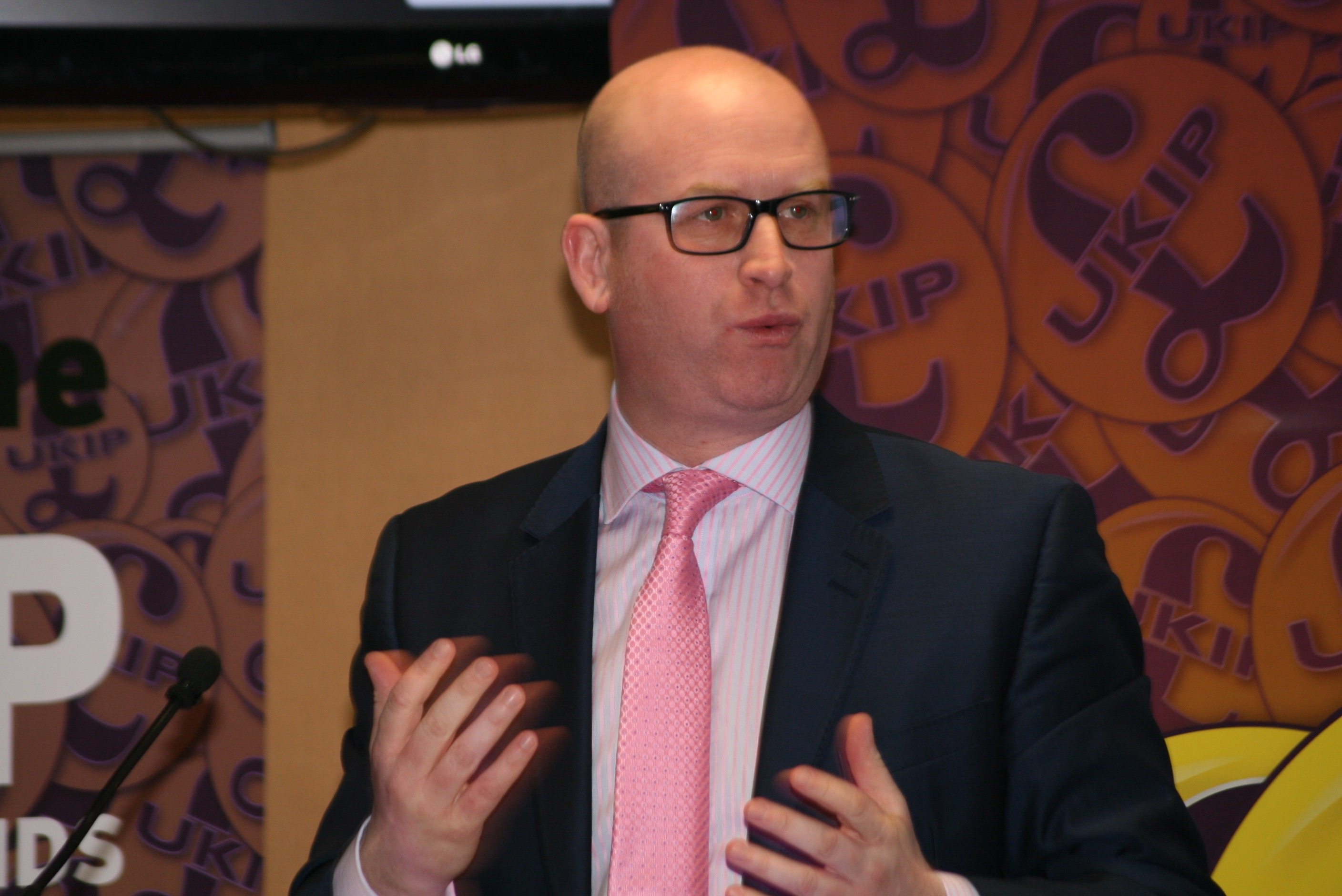
Paul Nuttall, Reform UK's Vice Chairman

The chairman of Reform UK (formerly the Brexit Party) is a position within Reform UK, a political party in the United Kingdom. The office has been held by Lee Anderson since May 2026. The role is appointed by the Leader of Reform UK.

== History ==
The office was first held by Richard Tice from May 2019 to March 2021 under the leadership of Nigel Farage. Tice left the role in order to replace Farage as leader of the party. With Tice's departure this left the role vacant until 2024 when he reassumed the role when he stepped down as party leader to allow Nigel Farage to return to the role for the upcoming general election.

Following the election, in July 2024, during a re-shuffle of Reform's leadership team, Tice was replaced as chairman by Zia Yusuf. Tice became deputy leader in this re-shuffle.

Yusuf chaired the party through the 2025 local elections then later resigned on 5 June 2025. Two days later he returned to working for the party; now as leader of Reform UK's Department of Government Efficiency.

The role remained vacant for five days until the appointment of former deputy party leader David Bull on 10 June 2025. Bull was replaced by Lee Anderson on 18 May 2026.

== Vice Chairman ==
On 3 July 2025, Reform UK appointed its first vice chairman. This was former UKIP leader, Paul Nuttall.

== List ==
=== Key ===
| Member of the House of Commons |
| Non-parliamentarian |

=== Chairman ===
| Chairman | Portrait | Took office | Left office | Elections | Leader |
|---|---|---|---|---|---|
| Richard Tice | | 8 May 2019 | 6 March 2021 | 2019 | Nigel Farage |
| — | Vacant | 6 March 2021 | 3 June 2024 | — | Richard Tice |
| Richard Tice | | 3 June 2024 | 11 July 2024 | 2024 | Nigel Farage |
| Zia Yusuf | | 11 July 2024 | 5 June 2025 | — | Nigel Farage |
| David Bull | | 10 June 2025 | 18 May 2026 | — | Nigel Farage |
| Lee Anderson | | 18 May 2026 | Incumbent | — | Nigel Farage |

=== Vice Chairman ===
| Chairman | Portrait | Took office | Left office | Elections | Leader |
|---|---|---|---|---|---|
| Paul Nuttall | | 3 July 2025 | Incumbent | – | Nigel Farage |

== See also ==
- Leader of Reform UK
- Deputy Leader of Reform UK
- Chief Whip of Reform UK
- List of Reform UK MPs
