= Political constitution =

A political constitution is a constitution where the legislature is the main check upon executive power. It can be contrasted to a legal constitution, where it is the judiciary which provides the greater checks upon government. In many countries both political and legal checks will be used to control the government.
