= Leader of Reform UK =

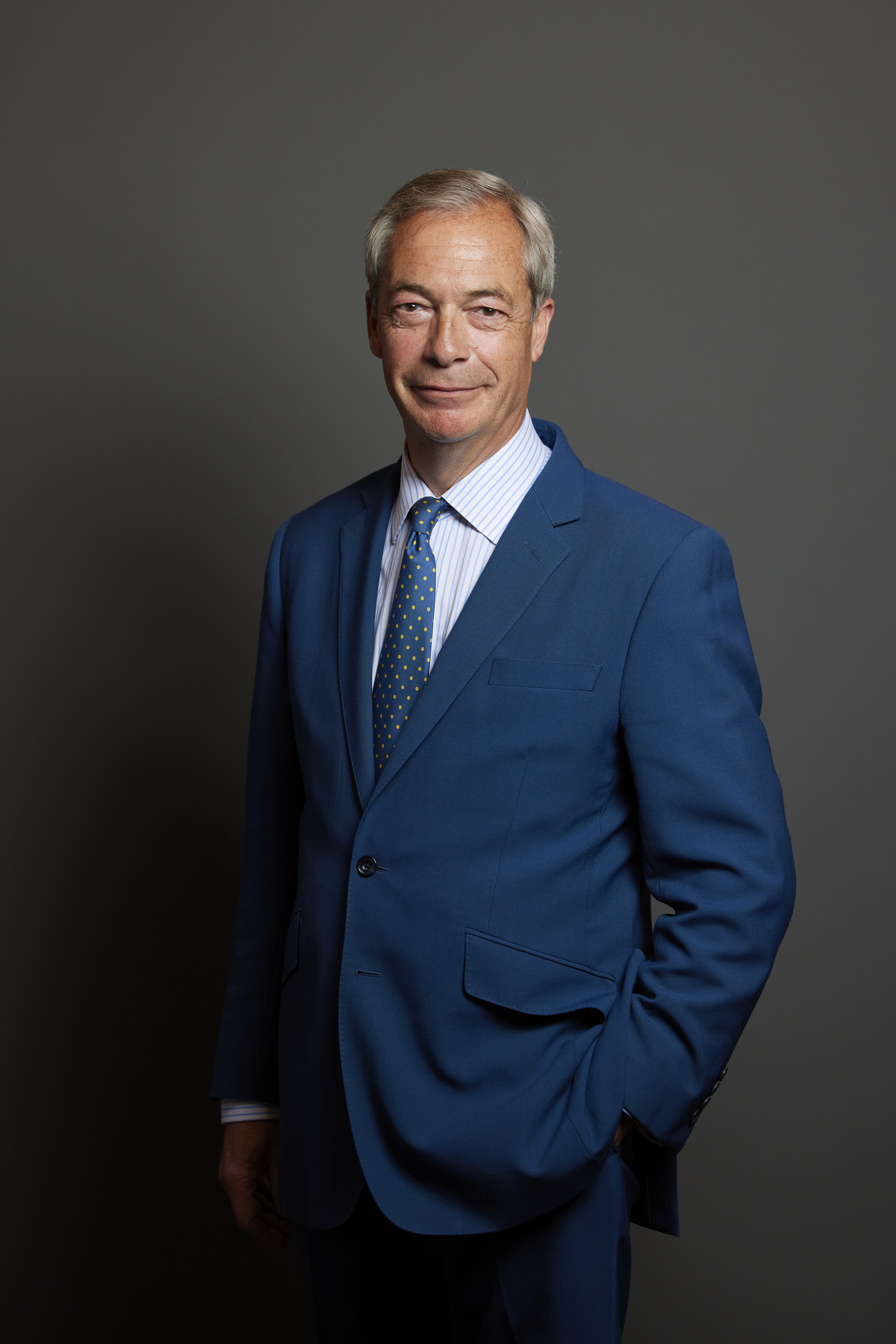
- Incumbent; Nigel Farage since 3 June 2024
- Formation: 20 January 2019 (as Leader of the Brexit Party); 4 January 2021 (as Leader of Reform UK)
- First holder: Catherine Blaiklock (Note: as Leader of the Brexit Party); Nigel Farage (Note: as Leader of Reform UK)
- Deputy: Deputy Leader of Reform UK

The leader of Reform UK is the highest and most senior position within Reform UK. The current holder is party founder Nigel Farage, who became leader on 3 June 2024, previously having served in the position from 2019 to 2021. The longest serving leader of the party was Richard Tice, having served three years and 90 days. The shortest tenure was held by Catherine Blaiklock, leader for 62 days.

From 20 January to 22 March 2019, the office was first held by Catherine Blaiklock. She resigned as leader when it was disclosed that she had made anti-Islamic and racist statements online. Blaiklock would leave the party in July 2019 and later joined the English Democrats in 2021. On 22 March 2019 the current leader Nigel Farage took over, two days after Blaiklock's resignation. Farage held the position until his retirement as a politician on 6 March 2021. Following Farage's resignation his party chairman, Richard Tice, became leader. Tice remained as leader until 3 June 2024 when he relinquished the position back to Farage who had announced his intention to stand as a candidate for MP in Clacton at the 2024 general election. Tice would later become deputy leader in July 2024. Farage led the party into the general election which saw the party win 5 seats in the House of Commons one of which was Farage in Clacton.

== List ==
| No. | Portrait | Leader | Took office | Left office | Tenure | Election(s) | Prime minister |
|---|---|---|---|---|---|---|---|
| 1 | | Catherine Blaiklock (born 1963) | 20 January 2019 | 22 March 2019 | 62 days | — | May (2016–2019) |
| 2 | | Nigel Farage (born 1964); 1st time | 22 March 2019 | 6 March 2021 | 1 year, 350 days | 2019 | May (2016–2019) |
| 2 | | Nigel Farage (born 1964); 1st time | 22 March 2019 | 6 March 2021 | 1 year, 350 days | 2019 | Johnson (2019–2022) |
| 3 | | Richard Tice (born 1964) | 6 March 2021 | 3 June 2024 | 3 years, 90 days | — | Johnson (2019–2022) |
| 3 | | Richard Tice (born 1964) | 6 March 2021 | 3 June 2024 | 3 years, 90 days | — | Truss (2022) |
| 3 | | Richard Tice (born 1964) | 6 March 2021 | 3 June 2024 | 3 years, 90 days | — | Sunak (2022–2024) |
| (2) | | Nigel Farage (born 1964); 2nd time | 3 June 2024 | Incumbent | 2 years, 169 days | 2024 | Sunak (2022–2024) |
| (2) | | Nigel Farage (born 1964); 2nd time | 3 June 2024 | Incumbent | 2 years, 169 days | 2024 | Starmer (2024–2026) |
| (2) | | Nigel Farage (born 1964); 2nd time | 3 June 2024 | Incumbent | 2 years, 169 days | 2024 | Burnham (2026–present) |

== See also ==
- Frontbench team of Nigel Farage
- Deputy Leader of Reform UK
- Chairman of Reform UK
- Chief Whip of Reform UK
- List of Reform UK MPs
