= Zia Yusuf =

British politician (born 1986)

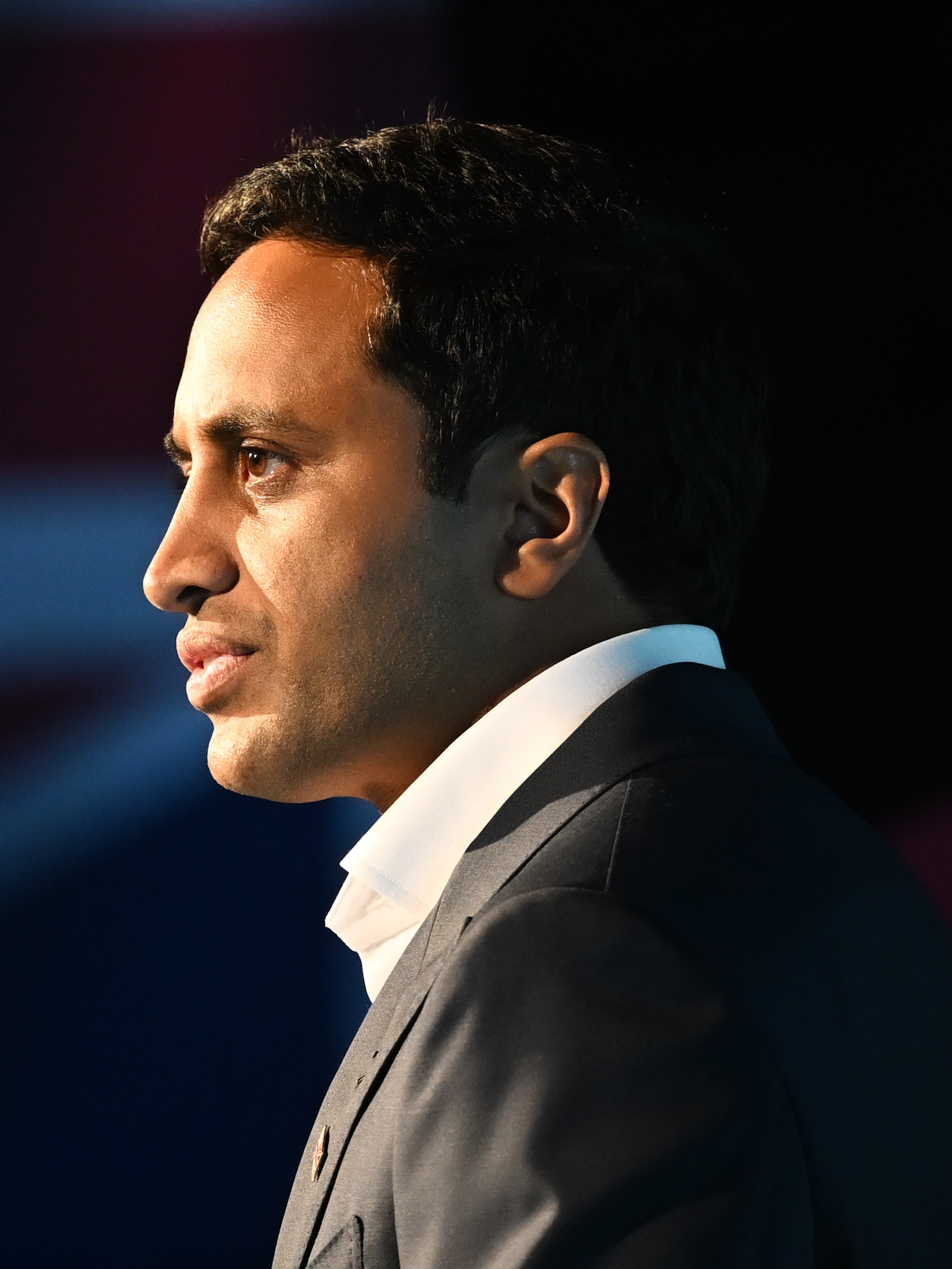
- Yusuf in 2025

Reform UK Spokesperson for Home Affairs
- Incumbent
- Assumed office 17 February 2026
- Leader: Nigel Farage
- Preceded by: Ann Widdecombe (Note: as Immigration and Justice spokesperson)

Chairman of Reform UK
- In office 11 July 2024 – 5 June 2025
- Leader: Nigel Farage
- Preceded by: Richard Tice
- Succeeded by: David Bull

Head of Policy for Reform UK
- In office 5 September 2025 – 17 February 2026
- Leader: Nigel Farage
- Preceded by: Position established
- Succeeded by: James Orr

Head of the Reform UK Department of Government Efficiency
- In office 9 June 2025 – 22 October 2025
- Leader: Nigel Farage
- Preceded by: Nathaniel Fried
- Succeeded by: Richard Tice

Personal details
- Born: Muhammad Ziauddin Yusuf; October 1986 (age 40) Bellshill, North Lanarkshire, Scotland
- Party: Reform UK (since 2024)
- Other political affiliations: Conservative (until 2024)
- Education: London School of Economics (BSc)

Muhammad Ziauddin Yusuf (born October 1986) is a British politician and businessman. He currently is Reform UK's spokesperson for home affairs.

He was the head of Reform UK's Department of Government Efficiency from June 2025 until October 2025, head of policy for Reform UK from September 2025 to February 2026, and Chairman of Reform UK from July 2024 until his resignation in June 2025. He was a member of the Conservative Party until August 2024.

== Early life ==
Muhammad Ziauddin Yusuf was born in October 1986 in Bellshill, Lanarkshire, Scotland. His parents were Sri Lankan Muslims who had emigrated to the UK in the early 1980s, and both worked for the NHS. His father, Hilmy Yusuf, is a paediatrician and his mother is a nurse. He has an older brother who works as a radiologist and a younger sister who works in education.

Yusuf and his family moved around often due to his father's work. He was mainly raised in Hampton and was educated at Hampton School, a boys-only private school in southwest London. There he won a 50% scholarship and met his future business partner, Alex Macdonald. In 2009, Yusuf was awarded a BSc in International relations from LSE.

== Business career ==
Yusuf worked at Merrill Lynch and Goldman Sachs after leaving university, specialising in European automotive and defence companies. He rose to executive director at Goldman Sachs. In 2014, Yusuf and Macdonald founded a luxury concierge company, Velocity Black, of which Yusuf was the CEO.

In 2023, Yusuf and Macdonald sold Velocity Black to Capital One for £233 million, and Yusuf made an estimated £31 million. In June 2025 a BBC report detailed allegations against Yusuf focusing on his conduct at Velocity Black. The report cited "unpredictable" behaviour, employee fear, and frequent dismissals. Another claim in the report said that Yusuf approved false financial figures that inflated Velocity Black's growth. Yusuf denied the financial allegations, blaming the finance team and asserting the figures were accurate.

== Political career ==
Yusuf first met Nigel Farage at a cocktail party hosted by the financier and UKIP treasurer Stuart Wheeler. After selling his business in 2023, he subsequently turned to politics and became the largest donor to Reform UK in the run-up to the 2024 general election held on 4 July.

In June 2024, Yusuf spoke at a Reform UK party conference, at the NEC in Birmingham. On 11 July 2024, he succeeded Richard Tice as Chairman of Reform UK. Despite a major donation to Reform UK in June 2024 and his appointment as party chair in July, Yusuf was a member of the Conservative Party, until August 2024. Yusuf had his membership revoked by the party after it had been publicly disclosed by The Guardian.

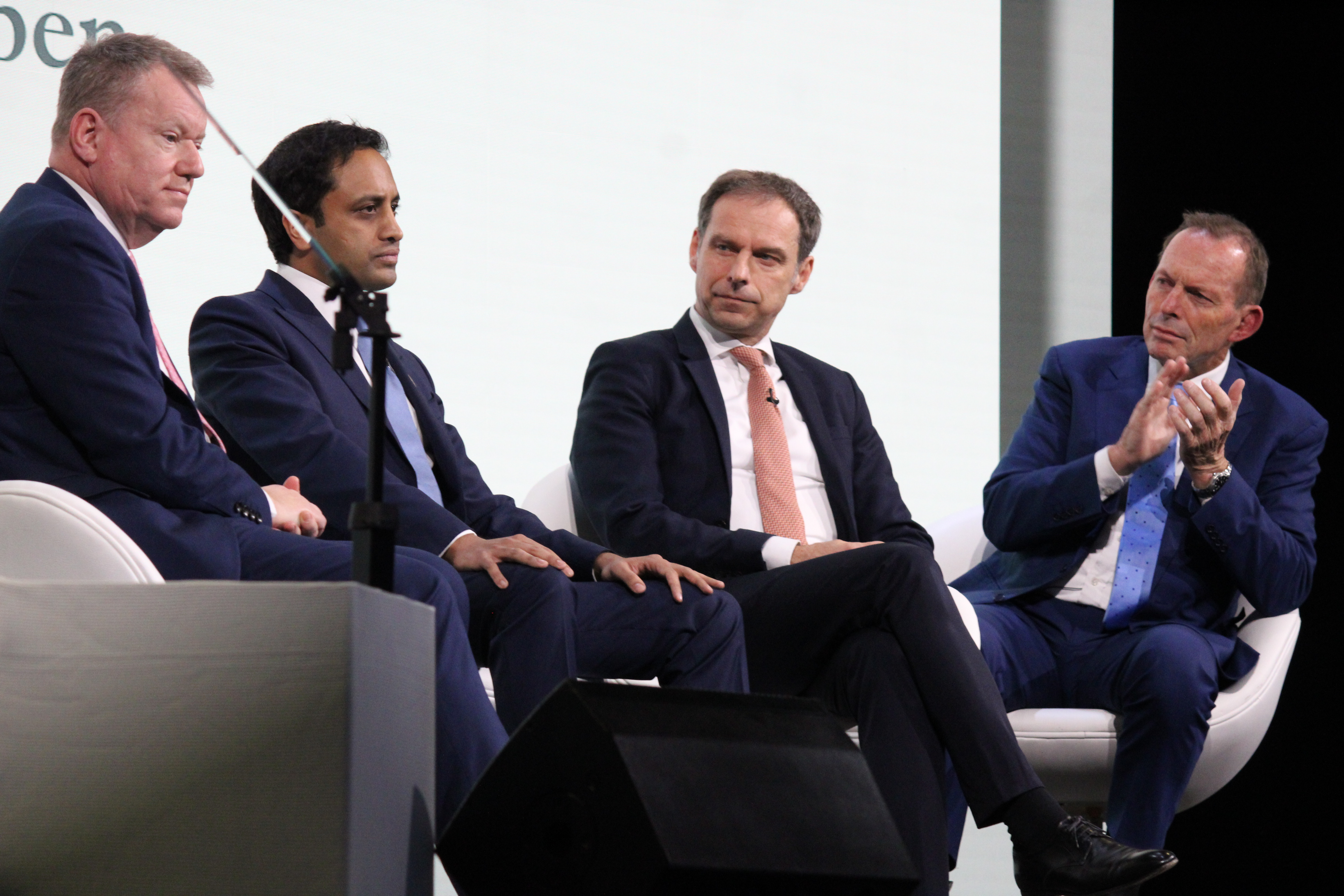
Yusuf speaking with David Frost, Thorsten Alsleben and Tony Abbott at the ARC 2025 in London

On 7 March 2025, it was reported that Reform MP Rupert Lowe had been suspended from the party due to alleged physical threats of violence against Yusuf on "at least two occasions". Lowe said the allegations were "untrue and false". Lowe alleged that Yusuf may have forced him out of the party for "talking too much about 'mass deportations'".

On 5 June 2025, Yusuf resigned his position as Chairman of Reform UK, stating: "I no longer believe working to get a Reform government elected is a good use of my time, and hereby resign the office." It came hours after Reform MP Sarah Pochin called for a burqa ban, which led to a statement by the Reform leadership that it was not party policy. Yusuf said he had not been informed of Pochin's plans to call for a ban and said it was "dumb" for her to call for a measure which went against Reform policy.

Two days later on 7 June 2025, Yusuf reversed his resignation following discussions with party leader Nigel Farage. He acknowledged that stepping down had been a hasty decision made in frustration. Upon his return, Yusuf took on a newly defined executive position, which included responsibilities over policy development, fundraising, media strategy, and leading the party's Department of Government Efficiency – apparently taking inspiration from the initiative of the same name set up by Elon Musk in the US. In a subsequent interview with The Sunday Times Yusuf said his intervention on Pochin's question had been an "error" and that if he were a Reform MP he would "probably" vote in favour of banning the burqa and other face coverings in public spaces. According to Nigel Farage, the reason Yusuf had initially quit was due to racist abuse he had received online. In an interview with Times Radio, Farage said: "I think it comes from the very hard extreme right. I have little doubt about that. They're Indian bots. Someone's paying for it to happen. I've no idea who it is."

On 17 February 2026, Yusuf was appointed to Nigel Farage's frontbench team as spokesperson for Home Affairs. He was succeeded as Reform UK Head of Policy by James Orr in February 2026. Whilst appearing on Question Time on 25 June 2026, Yusuf appeared to confirm that he had previously tried to stand for Reform UK but was not selected by the party, calling the presumption that he had not offered himself for candidacy "inaccurate".

== Political views ==
As a Reform UK spokesman, Yusuf has expressed support for British values which he terms as rule of law and cultural cohesion. He has described himself as formerly being on the political left during his time at the London School of Economics prior to joining the Conservative Party and later Reform. At the time he opposed the Iraq War and supported the election of Barack Obama. More recently, Yusuf has expressed support for the re-election of Donald Trump and attended the second inauguration of Donald Trump in Washington, D.C. in 2025. In March 2026, Yusuf said that he had only ever voted Conservative in his life prior to the existence of Reform UK.

Yusuf's politics have been characterised as "neither Left nor Right", positioning Reform as a "new, third-party, authentically populist alternative". Yusuf has argued for the United Kingdom to pursue stricter immigration policies, describing current immigration levels as "unsustainable" for public services. Although he has confirmed that he is a Muslim, he has spoken out against the rise of Muslims and Islam in Britain, and has supported Farage's statement that "a growing number of" Muslims "do not subscribe to British values, [who] in fact loathe much of what we stand for". In an interview organised by The Spectator, Yusuf stated that he supports a ban on the wearing of the burqa and other Islamic face coverings in public spaces, citing security considerations and cultural integration. He indicated that his proposal would specifically apply to Muslims and Muslim religious face veils and would not extend to other religions or forms of face coverings, such as balaclavas worn in non-religious contexts.

=== Controversies ===
On 13 August 2026, Yusuf accused Vodafone of "facilitating the invasion of Britain" after it emerged that the company had supplied free SIM cards, via its Charities Connected scheme, to the refugee charity Care4Calais for distribution to asylum seekers in the UK, including residents of the Wethersfield migrant camp in Essex. Yusuf said the sim cards had been distributed to migrants preparing to cross the Channel from France, and stated that a Reform UK government would hold Vodafone's directors "personally and criminally liable" and strip the company of government contracts under a proposed "Polanski's Law". Both Vodafone and Care4Calais disputed his claims, stating that the sim cards were for UK use only and had not been distributed in France.

== Personal life ==
Yusuf describes himself as a "British Muslim Patriot", and observes practices such as fasting during Ramadan. In a 2025 interview with The Financial Times Yusuf said he considers his religious beliefs to be a private matter.

Yusuf is a multi-millionaire.

== Notes ==
Party political offices
| Preceded by Richard Tice | Chairman of Reform UK; 11 July 2024 – 5 June 2025 | Succeeded by David Bull |
| Preceded by Position established | Leader of the Reform UK DOGE; 7 June 2025 – present | Incumbent |
