= Robert Ward =

Robert Ward may refer to:

== Arts and entertainment ==
- Robert Ward (blues musician) (1938–2008), American blues guitarist and singer
- Robert Ward (composer) (1917–2013), American composer of classical music
- Robert Ward (novelist) (active since 1972), American author and screenwriter
- Robert Ward (travel writer) (active since 2002), Canadian author
- Robert Ward, the name of several Australian cinema proprietors in the family who owned cinemas in the Melbourne suburb of Brighton
- Robert Martin Ward, editor of The Fifth Path

== Politics ==
=== Ireland ===
- Robert Ward (1754–1831), Irish MP for Wicklow Borough, Killyleagh and Bangor

=== UK ===
- Robert Ward (British politician) (1871–1942), British Conservative party politician
- Robert Ward (MP for City of York)
- Robert Ward (Jersey politician)
- Robert Plumer Ward (1765–1846), English novelist and politician

=== United States ===
- Robert Ward (Connecticut politician) (1952–2021), American lawyer and politician
- Robert W. Ward (1929–1997), secretary of state of Alaska, 1969–1970
- Robert Ward (Missouri politician) (1940–2017), American politician from Missouri

== Sport ==
- Bob Ward (footballer) (1881–?), Scottish footballer
- Bob Ward (American football, born 1927) (1927–2005), player and head coach of the University of Maryland Terrapins
- Bob Ward (American football, born 1933) (1933–2021), coach for the Dallas Cowboys
- Bobby Ward (born 1958), Scottish football player (Celtic, Newport County)
- Robert Ward (active 1914–15), owner of the Brooklyn Tip-Tops, an American baseball team
- Robbie Ward (born 1995), English rugby league footballer

== Other people ==
- Robert Ward (British Army officer) (born 1935)
- Robert Ward (scholar), English scholar active in the seventeenth century
- Robert DeCourcy Ward (1867–1931), American climatologist and eugenics proponent
- Robert George Ward (1928–2013), Australian metallurgist
- Robert Joseph Ward (1926–2003), American judge
- Bob Ward (communications director) (active since 2008), policy and communications director of the Grantham Research Institute on Climate Change and the Environment

== Other uses ==
- USCGC Robert Ward, a U.S. Coast Guard cutter launched in 2018

== See also ==
- Robert de La Ward, 1st Baron De La Ward (died 1306)
