= Reform UK =

Political party in the United Kingdom

- Leader: Nigel Farage
- Deputy Leader: Richard Tice
- Chairman: Lee Anderson
- Founders: Nigel Farage; Catherine Blaiklock
- Founded: 23 November 2018; 7 years ago
- Split from: UK Independence Party
- Headquarters: Millbank Tower; 21–24 Millbank; London; SW1P 4QP
- Membership (December 2025): 268,000
- Ideology: Right-wing populism; Hard Euroscepticism
- Political position: Right-wing to far-right
- Affiliates: Reform Derby; Reform UK Scotland; Reform UK Wales
- Northern Irish affiliation: Traditional Unionist Voice (alliance, 2024)
- Colours: Turquoise White
- Slogan: Britain is broken. Britain needs Reform.
- Governing body: Reform UK Board
- House of Commons: 8 / 650
- House of Lords: 0 / 796
- Scottish Parliament: 16 / 129
- Senedd: 33 / 96
- London Assembly: 2 / 25
- Directly elected strategic authority mayors in England: 2 / 14
- Directly elected single authority mayors in England: 0 / 13
- Councillors: 2,293 / 18,645
- Councils led: 35 / 369
- PCCs and PFCCs: 2 / 37

Website
- reformparty.uk

Reform UK, also known as the Reform Party or simply Reform, is a right-wing populist and far-right political party in the United Kingdom. It has eight members of Parliament in the House of Commons, two members of the London Assembly, 33 members of the Senedd, 16 members of the Scottish Parliament, two police and crime commissioners, and controls 26 local councils. It is to the right of the Conservative Party. Nigel Farage has been leader of Reform UK since June 2024.

The party was co-founded by Farage and Catherine Blaiklock in 2018 as the Brexit Party, advocating a no-deal Brexit; it won the most seats at the 2019 European Parliament election in the UK. The UK withdrew from the European Union in January 2020, and later in the same year the COVID-19 pandemic began in the UK. The Conservative government imposed a series of national lockdowns and Farage focused on anti-lockdown campaigning. The party was renamed Reform UK in January 2021. Farage stepped down as leader in March 2021 and was succeeded by Richard Tice.

Classified as part of the radical right, since 2022, the party has campaigned on a broader platform, pledging to reduce taxation, limit immigration, oppose net-zero emissions policies and substantially reduce public spending. In March 2024, Lee Anderson, who was elected in 2019 as a Conservative MP, defected to Reform UK, becoming its first MP. In June 2024, Farage resumed the leadership. The party won five seats at the 2024 general election, the first time it had elected MPs. Several incumbent and former Conservative MPs have since defected to it.

== History ==
=== Brexit Party ===
The incorporation of the Brexit Party in November 2018 was formally announced on 20 January 2019 by the former UK Independence Party (UKIP) economics spokesperson, Catherine Blaiklock who served as the Brexit Party's initial leader. On 5 February 2019, it was registered with the Electoral Commission to run candidates in English, Scottish, Welsh and European Union elections.

On the day of the announcement, Nigel Farage, who had been an independent member of the European Parliament (MEP) since his departure from UKIP in early December 2018, said that the party was Blaiklock's idea but that she had acted with his full support. On 8 February 2019, Farage stated he would stand as a candidate for the party in any potential future European Parliament elections contested in the United Kingdom. The MEPs Steven Woolfe and Nathan Gill, also formerly of UKIP, stated that they would also stand for the party.

The party's lead aim was for the United Kingdom to leave the EU, and then for Britain to trade internationally on World Trade Organization terms. In April 2019, Farage said that there was "no difference between the Brexit party and UKIP in terms of policy, [but] in terms of personnel, there's a vast difference", criticising UKIP's connections to the far right. He also said that the party aimed to attract support from "across the board", including former UKIP voters and Conservative and Labour voters who had supported Brexit. Later in the month he said that the party would not publish a manifesto until after the European elections had taken place, saying that the party would have a policy platform instead of a manifesto.

In May 2019, Farage described his admiration for how fellow Europe of Freedom and Direct Democracy members, Italy's Five Star Movement, had managed to grow from a protest group into the country's largest political party in both houses of the Italian Parliament. He saw the Brexit Party doing the same kind of thing and "running a company, not a political party, hence our model of registered supporters" and building a base using an online platform.

On 11 November 2019, the last day for candidates to register, Farage declared that the Brexit Party would not field candidates in the 317 seats in which there was an incumbent Conservative MP. This was done with the support of most of the Brexit Party candidates, so as not to split the anti-EU vote.

On 22 November 2019, the Brexit Party set out its proposals for the 2019 general election. They covered a wide range of policy areas including taxation, reforming politics, immigration and the environment. The party received two percent of the vote in the election, with none of its 273 candidates winning a seat.

=== Transition into Reform UK ===
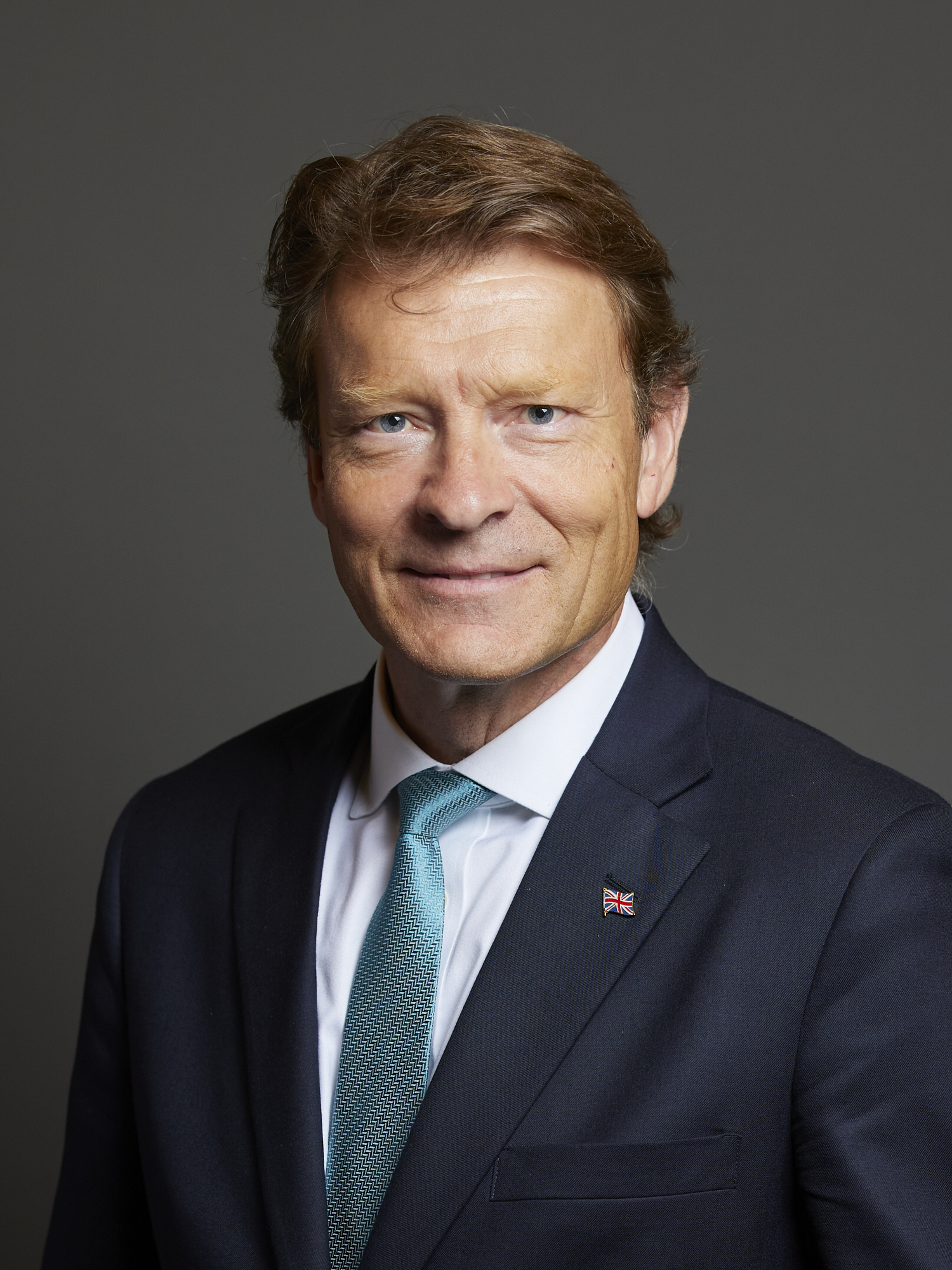
Deputy leader and former party leader, Richard Tice

Before the general election on 8 December 2019, Farage announced that, following Brexit, the party would change its name to the "Reform Party", and campaign for changes in the electoral system and structure of the House of Commons. Farage has stated that he admired the Reform Party of Canada in the 1990s, which both influenced his politics and the naming of Reform UK; further, Preston Manning, the historic leader of the Reform Party of Canada, attended a Reform UK event alongside Farage in Birmingham on 5 September 2025.

In November 2020, Farage and Tice announced that they had applied to the Electoral Commission to rename the Brexit Party to 'Reform UK'. They said that the party would campaign on a platform that was opposed to further COVID-19 lockdowns and that it would seek to reform aspects of the British government, including the BBC and the House of Lords. The party also gave its support to the Great Barrington Declaration. On 4 January 2021, the party's name change to Reform UK was approved by the Electoral Commission.

In 2021, Reform UK gained representation in the Scottish Parliament when Michelle Ballantyne, then an independent and formerly a Conservative member of the Scottish Parliament (MSP), joined the party and was named Reform UK's leader in Holyrood. She lost her and the party's only seat in Scotland in the 2021 Scottish Parliament election, and resigned as the party's leader in Scotland in February 2022.

Farage stepped down as leader in March 2021, being replaced by the party chairman, Tice. The former North West England MEP David Bull was appointed as deputy leader of the party on 11 March 2021. On 26 March 2021, it was announced that the former Brexit Party MEP Nathan Gill had become the Leader of Reform UK Wales. In 2021, Reform UK announced its intention to field a full slate of candidates in the Senedd, Scottish Parliament and London Assembly elections with Tice standing for election in the latter. The party failed to win any seats above local level in the 2021 elections in May, and lost their deposit in the Hartlepool by-election.

At the 2021 Senedd election, the party fielded candidates in every constituency and on the regional lists; it picked up 1.6% of the constituency vote (7th place) and 1.1% of the regional list votes (8th place). At the 2021 Scottish Parliament election no constituency candidates were fielded and the party received only 5,793 list votes across the whole country. At the London Assembly election none of their constituency candidates were elected and the party finished tenth on the London-wide list with 25,009 votes.

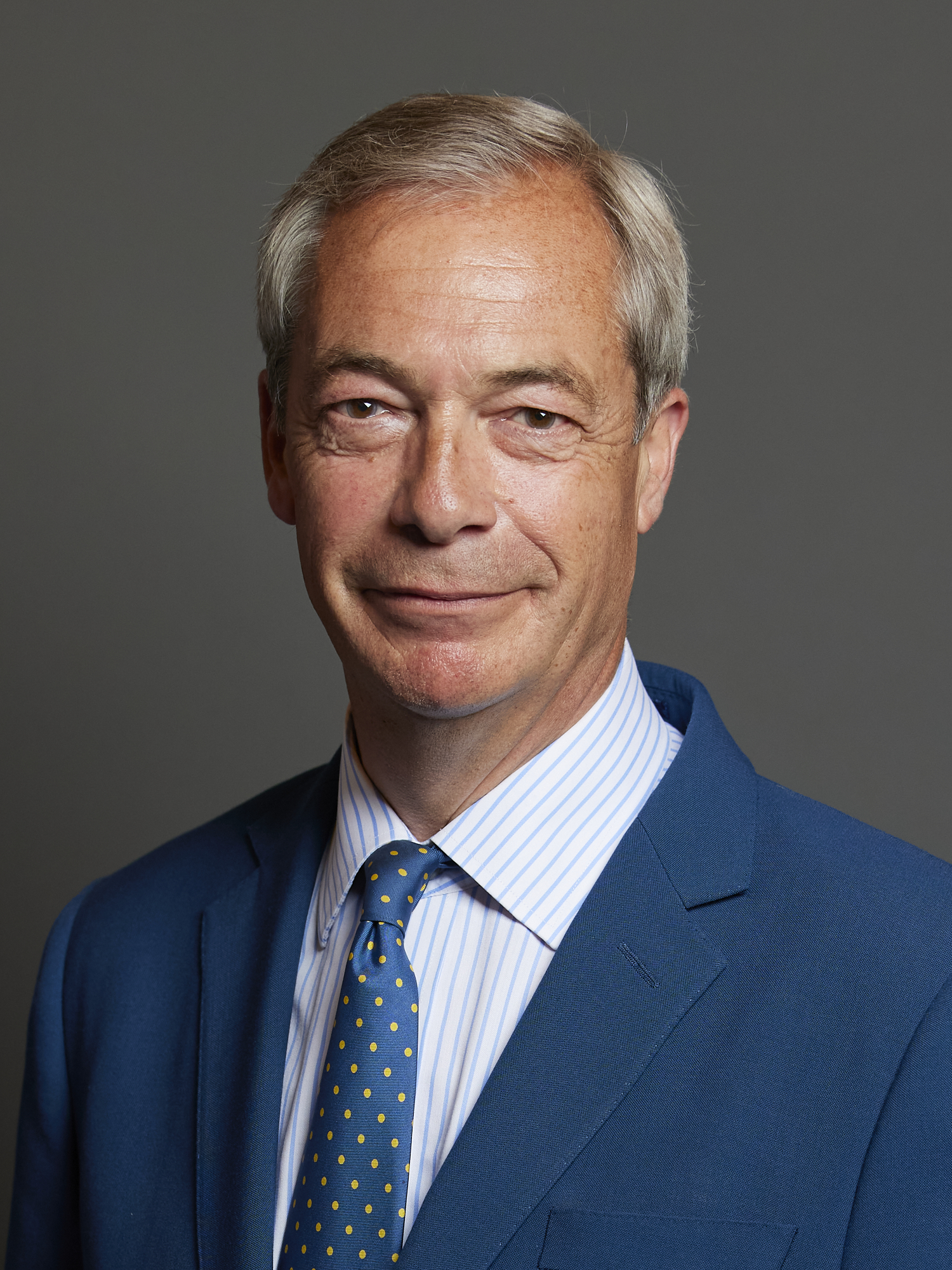
Party leader Nigel Farage

In October 2022, Reform UK and the Social Democratic Party (SDP) announced an electoral pact. Tice declared Reform's intention to stand in 630 constituencies across England, Scotland and Wales with "no ifs, no buts". In December 2022 David White, a Conservative member of Barnsley Metropolitan Borough Council, and Richard Langridge, a Conservative member of West Oxfordshire District Council, both defected to Reform UK to stand as prospective parliamentary candidates for the party.

The media gave renewed attention to Reform UK in December 2022 during the cost-of-living crisis after Farage announced that it would stand a full slate of candidates at the next general election. Tice remained leader of the party. After some opinion polls indicated a modest increase in support for Reform UK, The Daily Telegraph described the party as a "threat on the Right" to the Conservative government of Prime Minister Rishi Sunak.

=== 2024 general election ===
On 7 and 8 October 2023, Reform UK held its party conference in London with 1,100 attendees. On 20 October 2023 Tice confirmed that Reform UK would stand in Conservative seats at the 2024 general election, and by January 2024 the party was polling around 10% of the popular vote. It was suggested that Reform UK would play the role of spoiler party for the Conservatives, since it attracted former Conservative voters. The Guardian speculated that votes for the party could lead to more than 30 additional seat losses for the Conservative Party.

Logos of the Reform UK–TUV alliance
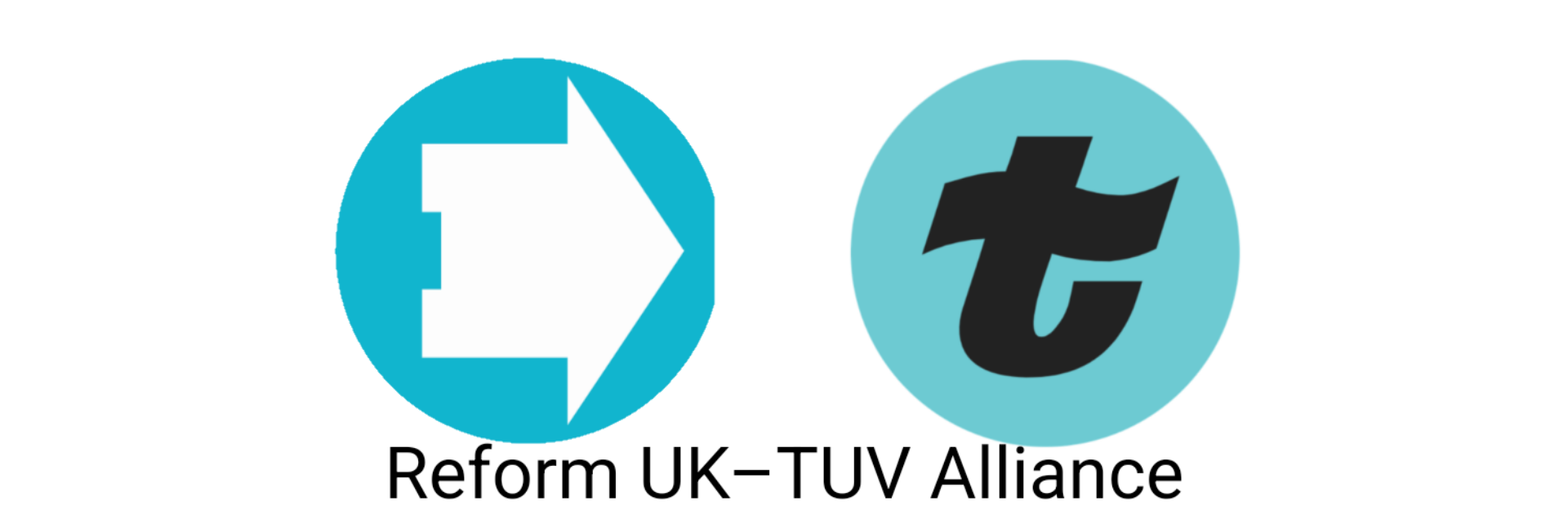

In Northern Ireland, in March 2024, the party formed an electoral pact with the Traditional Unionist Voice (TUV), in which the two parties would stand mutually agreed candidates there. In May 2024 Alex Wilson became Reform's first London Assembly member, elected via the London-wide voting system. On 3 June 2024 Farage replaced Tice as leader of the party. It gained five MPs in England in the July 2024 general election, and its Northern Irish affiliate TUV gaining one seat with Jim Allister.

In March 2024, Simon Danczuk, the former Labour MP for Rochdale, joined Reform and stood as their parliamentary candidate in the 2024 Rochdale by-election. Danczuk received 6.3% of the vote, thus saving his deposit, but was not elected. The seat was won by George Galloway.

Analysis in March 2024 by Matt Goodwin for the Legatum Institute showed that support for Reform, like UKIP and the Brexit Party before it, was strongest among older voters and those who voted Leave, and relatively even across social classes. By NRS social grades, 36% of likely Reform voters were in AB, 22% in C1, 23% in C2 and 19% in DE.

In May 2024, Farage declared that Reform is becoming a "brand new Conservative movement", while criticising Labour and Conservative immigration policies as being indistinguishable from each other.

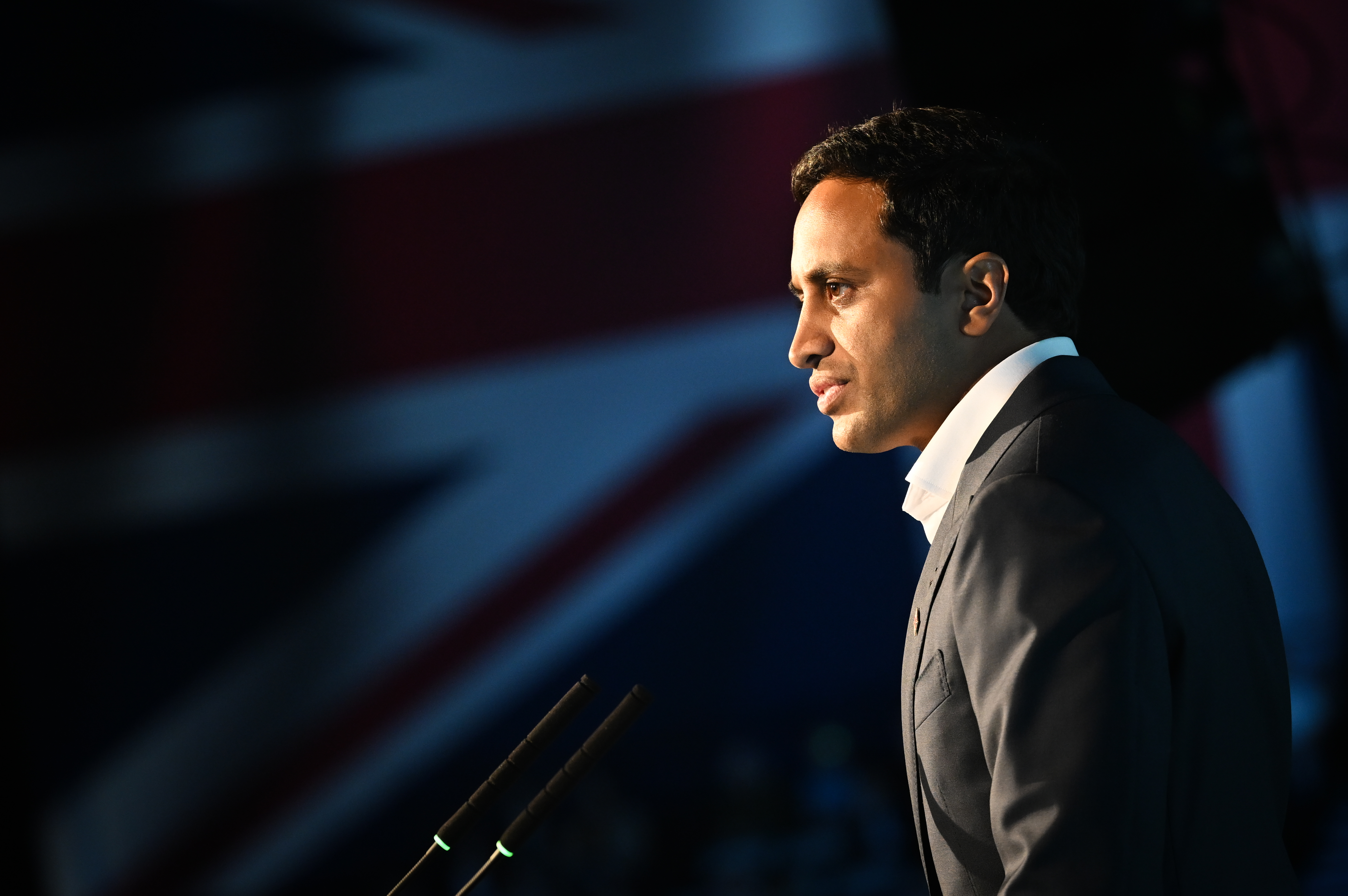
Zia Yusuf addressing a Reform UK pre-election rally at the NEC near Birmingham on 30 June 2024

Following the election, on 11 July, the businessman Zia Yusuf replaced Tice as chairman of the party, with Tice, now an MP, replacing Ben Habib as deputy leader. The party plans to stand at the 2026 Scottish Parliament election, and expected to win significantly in the 2026 Senedd election in Wales, under the new more proportional system. In September 2024 Farage said that he would be surrendering all of his shares in Reform UK. This would mean members would have more control over the party, such as being able to vote on a constitution and motions, and could remove Farage as leader if over 50% of members wrote to Yusuf. In October 2024 Farage called for Conservative councillors to join Reform UK and said "a huge number of them genuinely agree with us and what we stand for".

In November 2024, it was reported that senior members of the party were divided about supporters of political activist Tommy Robinson, with two of the party's parliamentary candidates expressing sympathy for some of the supporters of Robinson who took part in August's anti-immigration protests, in the face of objections from Tice and Farage. For the free vote on the assisted suicide bill, Tice, Lee Anderson and Rupert Lowe supported the bill in its second reading, whilst Farage and James McMurdock opposed it.

In November and December 2024, several high-profile Conservatives quit that party and joined Reform. These included the former MP Andrea Jenkyns, former MP Lucy Allan, Tim Montgomerie (founder of ConservativeHome and adviser to Boris Johnson), Rael Braverman (husband of the former Home Secretary Suella Braverman), the actress and singer Holly Valance and Nick Candy (the billionaire luxury property developer and former Conservative donor).

In December 2024, it was reported that American businessman Elon Musk was planning a $100 million donation to the Reform UK party to influence the next UK election. Farage said that talk of a $100m donation to his party was "pure speculation". That month Farage travelled to Florida, US, to meet Musk, a trip partly financed by his friend George Cottrell, who had served a prison sentence for fraud in 2017.

On 26 December 2024, Reform UK claimed to have overtaken the Conservatives and become the UK's second-largest party, behind Labour, in terms of size. Kemi Badenoch, the leader of the Conservative Party, later claimed on X that Reform's totals were faked. Following this, Reform invited the Financial Times, Sky News, The Spectator and The Daily Telegraph to inspect their website's front and back-end code and the underlying data of the party's numbers. Each media outlet subsequently confirmed the ticker to be accurate. Farage refuted Badenoch's claim, stating that the allegations were "disgraceful" and threatened legal action should Badenoch not apologise.

=== 2025 ===
On 5 January 2025, the American businessman Elon Musk publicly urged Farage to step down as leader of Reform UK, marking a sudden withdrawal of support. Musk had previously supported Farage and been photographed with him, but later tweeted "The Reform Party needs a new leader. Farage doesn't have what it takes". The withdrawal of support came after Farage disagreed with and distanced himself from comments made by Musk supporting Robinson, who was jailed for contempt of court. Two days later Farage said that he aimed to "mend fences" with Musk, whom he referred to as a "heroic figure".

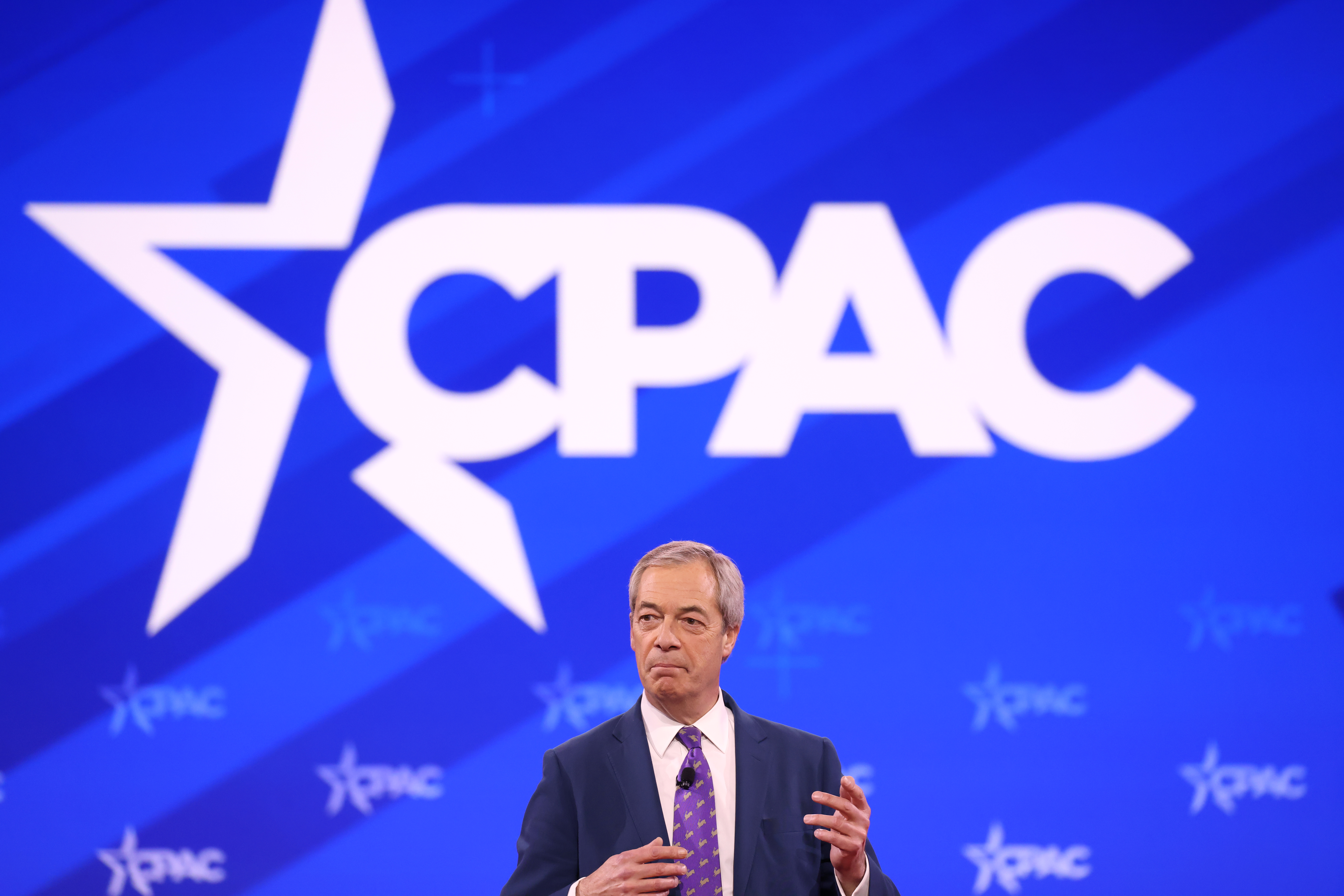
Farage speaking at the Conservative Political Action Conference (CPAC) in the United States, February 2025

On 3 February 2025, Reform topped a national YouGov poll for the first time. On 20 February 2025, following a September 2024 promise by Farage to hand control of the party to its members and give up his ownership of the party, the party ownership was transferred to Reform 2025 Limited, a company limited by guarantee with Farage and Yusuf as directors. Yusuf stated that "We are assembling the governing board, in line with the constitution. This was an important step in professionalising the party as we prepare for government."

In March 2025, Jack Aaron, a parliamentary candidate for the party at the 2024 general election, was appointed as head of vetting for the party. In that same year Lowe was suspended from the party due to allegations of bullying office staff.

In May 2025 Sarah Pochin was elected as the party's fifth MP at the by-election in Runcorn and Helsby, with a majority of 6.

The party placed first, winning the most seats, and took control of 10 local authorities and two mayoralties. At 30%, Reform's projected national vote share (PNS) was higher than UKIP's 23% at the 2013 local elections, representing the first set of local elections since PNS began to be calculated in which neither the Conservative nor Labour parties received the highest vote share.

Also in May 2025, analysis by the Financial Times of data from a More In Common survey showed that the projected Reform vote share had a strong correlation with poor social mobility in a constituency, as measured by the educational and early career achievement of those receiving free school meals, with no correlation for the Conservatives and Liberal Democrats, and a weak positive correlation for Labour. Social mobility is lowest in the constituencies with the highest Leave vote in the 2016 EU referendum – 27 of the 30 seats with lowest social mobility voted Leave – and highest in constituencies with the highest foreign-born population.

Later in May 2025, a far-right influencer, David Clews, and the founder of the far-right organisation Patriotic Alternative, Mark Collett (both of whom formerly worked for the fascist British National Party), both called on their supporters to "infiltrate" Reform UK and move it politically further right and in support of extremist views. Clews claimed that he has sympathisers in Reform UK who are branch chairs and who have been on Reform UK candidate lists. A Reform spokesman said the far-right would never be welcome in the party and a "stringent vetting process" was in place.

On 5 June 2025, Yusuf resigned his position as Chairman of Reform UK, stating on Twitter: "I no longer believe working to get a Reform government elected is a good use of my time, and hereby resign the office." It came hours after Pochin's call for a national ban on the wearing of burqas, which led to media speculation that Yusuf's resignation had been as a result of the question and a statement by Reform that it was not official party policy. Yusuf said he had not been informed of Pochin's plans to call for a ban and said it was "dumb" for her to call for a measure which went against Reform policy. Yusuf returned to Reform UK 48 hours in a different capacity after resigning, saying his resignation "was a decision born of exhaustion" and was a "mistake". In a subsequent interview with The Sunday Times Yusuf stated that his intervention over the burqa question had been an "error" and that if he were an MP he would "probably" vote in favour of banning the burqa along with other face coverings in public. The former deputy leader David Bull was later announced as Yusuf's successor as chairman.

Inspired by Musk's Department of Government Efficiency in US President Donald Trump's administration, a unit with the title Department of Government Efficiency was established by Farage and Yusuf in June 2025 after the party gained control of a number of councils in the 2025 local elections. The unit's remit only focused on Kent and Lancashire County Councils with plans to extend to West Northamptonshire Council. The unit's "head", the tech entrepreneur Nathaniel Fried, resigned alongside Yusuf on 6 June 2025, less than a week after starting the role, saying that as Yusuf had appointed him it was "appropriate for me to leave with him". On 7 June 2025 Yusuf announced he was returning to working with Reform UK, now as the new leader of the unit.

In June 2025, Reform also contested the Hamilton, Larkhall and Stonehouse by-election and recorded their strongest result to date in an election for the Scottish Parliament by finishing in third place (behind Scottish Labour and the Scottish National Party) with 26.1% of the vote. The election was described by journalists and the political scientist Sir John Curtice as a breakthrough for the party in Scotland.

At the end of June 2025, two political groups were launched by prominent former Reform UK members, each positioning themselves as an alternative to Reform UK. Advance UK is a creation of Ben Habib, former Brexit Party MEP and deputy leader of Reform UK, while Restore Britain is a creation of Lowe. Both groups were launched on the same day, 30 June. On 5 July 2025 the MP James McMurdock suspended himself from the party as "a precautionary measure" due to a pending investigation into him for previous property tax offences during the COVID-19 pandemic. McMurdock was cleared by the parliamentary standards commissioner of the allegation but decided not to return to Reform UK and instead remain as an independent MP. The party announced the same month that it would replace its existing vetting process with a looser "common-sense vetting" approach, and has suggested that candidates rejected by the previous vetting process re-apply, with re-applications to be treated as priority cases.

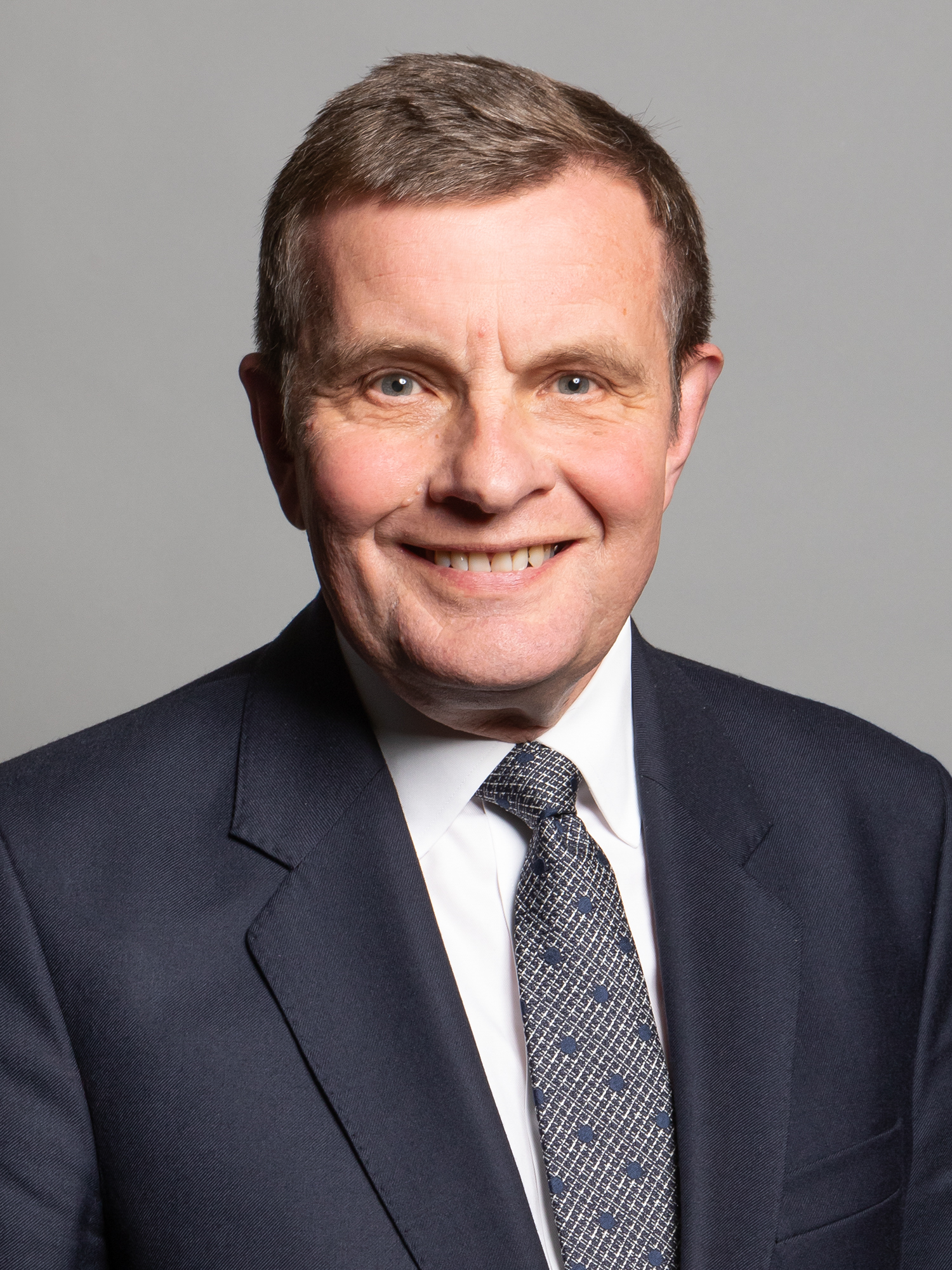
David Jones is among the former Conservative Party cabinet members to have defected to Reform UK.

In July 2025, Paul Nuttall was appointed as Reform UK's deputy chairman.

In August 2025, Mick Barton, the Reform UK leader of Nottinghamshire County Council took the unprecedented step of banning the local newspaper, Nottingham Post, from talking to himself or any Reform UK councillors and said that the authority would stop sending press releases to the publication and it would not be invited to council events. Barton accused the paper of "consistently misrepresenting our policies, actions or intentions" and said the ban was "not about silencing journalism", but "about upholding the principle that freedom of speech must be paired with responsibility and honesty". Deputy leader Richard Tice defended the policy when challenged about it being undemocratic to ban media. On 17 September 2025, Mason Humberstone a member of Stevenage Borough Council, became the first Labour Party councillor to defect to Reform UK.

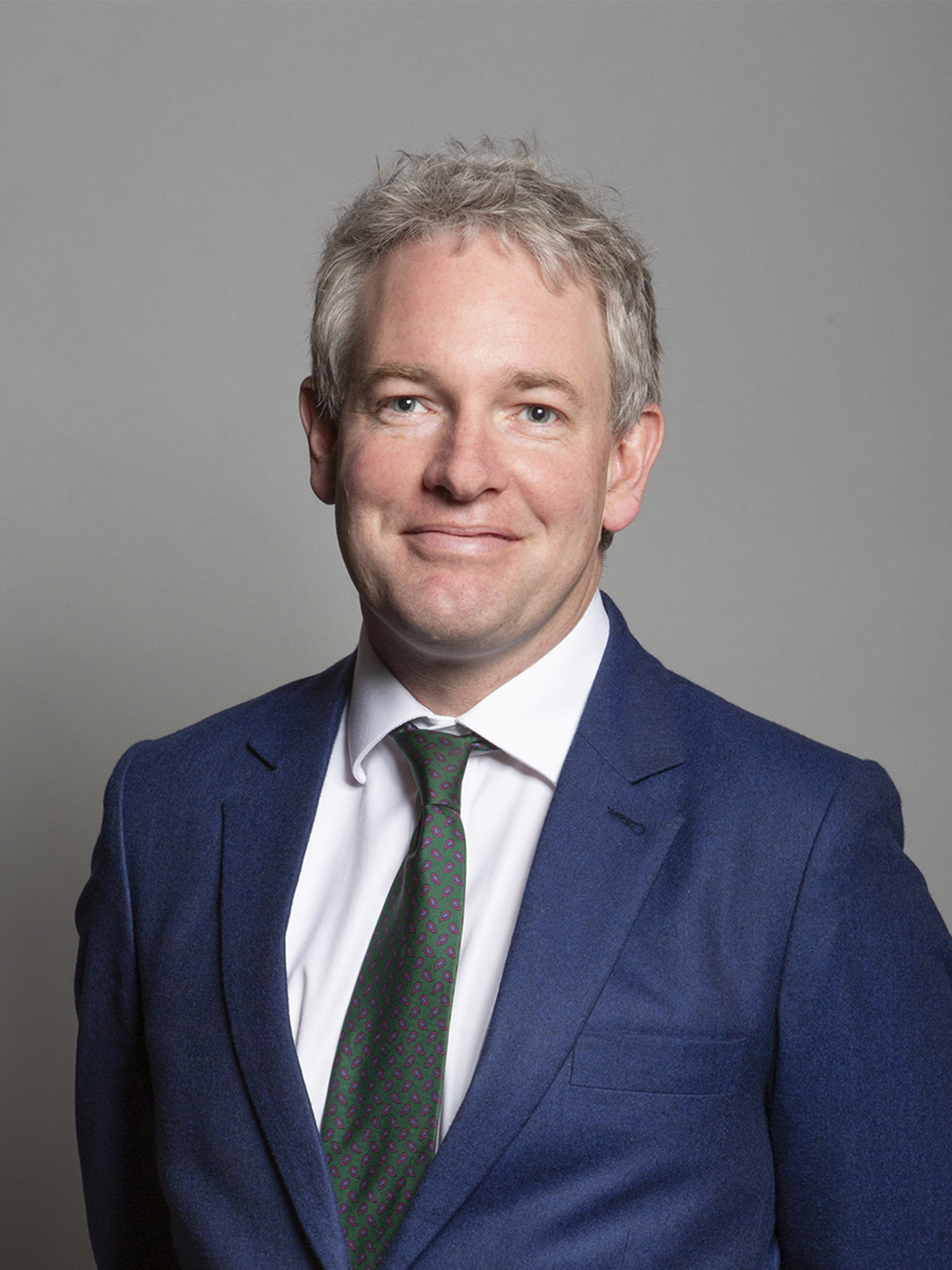
Danny Kruger, the MP for East Wiltshire who defected from the Conservatives to Reform in September 2025, was the first sitting MP to defect to Reform from another party. (Note: Although Lee Anderson, the MP for Ashfield, defected to Reform UK in March 2024 becoming their first MP after formerly being of the Conservative Party, at the time of his defection he was an independent after having the Conservative whip suspended and being kicked out of the party in February 2024. Danny Kruger, therefore, was the first MP to defect to Reform UK from another party and not as an independent.)

On 15 September, Danny Kruger, the Conservative MP for East Wiltshire, defected to Reform. In a press conference after his defection was announced, Kruger stated "the Conservatives are over" and that he was "honoured" to have been asked to help prepare Reform for government, adding that he hoped Farage would be the next prime minister. On 26 September, Reform UK announced it had reached 250,000 paid-up members, more than double that of the Conservatives at 123,000 members, and just shy of 60,000 short of Labour, which had the largest number of members at 309,000. On the same day, Nathan Gill, an ex-Reform politician and former leader of Reform Wales between March and May 2021, who quit the party later that year, pleaded guilty for accepting bribes from pro-Russian journalist and former member of the Ukrainian Parliament pro-Russian 'Opposition Platform — For Life' party Oleh Voloshyn, at the Old Bailey in London. Gill pleaded guilty to eight counts of bribery. The charges related to payments of money he accepted from Voloshyn between 2018 and 2019 while serving as a Brexit Party MEP in the European Parliament, in exchange for making specific pro-Russian statements directed by Voloshyn in the European parliament and media. Gill was sentenced on 21 November 2025 to ten years and six months in prison. Reform UK condemned Gill's actions and Farage described him as a "bad apple".

In September, Tice took part in "Britain's March Against Antisemitism", at which he said, "I don't want a single Jewish person to feel like they have to leave. We need to stand united, united as proud Britons." The following month, a YouGov poll found that 46% of white British respondents viewed the party and its policies as racist, compared with 36% who regarded the party as "generally not racist". Among respondents from ethnic minority backgrounds, 13% had a favourable opinion while 80% had a negative view.

In December 2025, the Electoral Commission reported that Reform UK had received over £10 million in donations in the third quarter of 2025. These donations included, but were not limited to, a £9 million donation by Christopher Harborne and donations of £250,000 and £240,000 by Nick Candy. In the same month, a report by The Times said Reform had grown into the largest political party in Britain and overtaken Labour by membership numbers.

Later that month, Essex Police began assessing allegations that Reform UK overspent on Farage's campaign to become an MP in Clacton in the 2024 United Kingdom general election. The claims were made by Richard Everett, a former Reform UK councillor. A Reform spokesperson denied the party had broken electoral law, saying the "inaccurate claims come from a disgruntled former councillor". Essex Police later said that an investigation could not take place because more than a year had passed since the alleged offence. The Electoral Commission said it would take no further action on the allegations, stating: "We did not identify credible evidence of potential offences of electoral law".

=== 2026 ===
On 7 January 2026, Laila Cunningham was announced as the Reform candidate for the 2028 London mayoral election. On 12 January 2026, former Conservative Chancellor of the Exchequer Nadhim Zahawi joined Reform UK. Three days later, former Shadow Secretary of State for Justice and Shadow Lord Chancellor and Conservative Party immigration minister Robert Jenrick joined Reform UK after being expelled from the Conservative Party, bringing the party's representation in the House of Commons to six MPs. On 18 January 2026, Conservative MP for Romford, Andrew Rosindell, announced he had switched allegiances to Reform and became the party's seventh Member of Parliament. On 26 January 2026, Conservative MP for Fareham and Waterlooville and former Home Secretary Suella Braverman also defected to Reform, becoming the party's eighth MP.

On 27 January 2026, GB News presenter and author Matthew Goodwin was announced as Reform UK's candidate for the Gorton and Denton by-election. He was described by the Liberal Democrats, who also had a candidate in the election, as being racist for suggesting that some people from ethnic minority backgrounds born in the UK were not necessarily British. Goodwin stated the media reports were misleading, and that he said that second generation immigrants committing terrorist acts such as the Manchester Arena bombing are not "as British as" their victims.

On 4 February 2026, The National reported that the Reform UK treasurer, Nick Candy, was named in the Epstein files. On 10 February 2026, the Clacton Gazette reported that Farage said there was no wrongdoing because Candy “never had anything to do with Epstein.”

On 13 February 2026, former Reform MP Rupert Lowe announced the creation of his own political party, Restore Britain, which had existed since 30 June 2025 as a pressure group. Shortly after, a number of Reform councilors defected to the new party.

On 17 February 2026, Nigel Farage announced the creation of his Reform UK frontbench team. In the May 2026 local elections, Reform UK won over 1,400 seats (out of 4754). In the Scottish Parliament election, Reform won 17 MSPs (out of 129), and in the Welsh Senedd election, they won 34 MSs (out of 96).

=== Financial allegations ===
In 2026, the finances of Reform UK and Nigel Farage at the time of the 2024 United Kingdom general election came under scrutiny following reports by The Guardian and The Sunday Times that Farage had failed to declare donations from Christopher Harborne and George Cottrell. Farage and representatives from Reform said that Farage did not need to declare these donations as they were gifts given to him before he became an MP. Donations made by Cottrell and his mother Fiona to Reform UK during the same time period are also under investigation, with Richard Tice and George Cottrell both denying that there was anything wrong with these donations. Farage subsequently resigned from parliament in order to fight a by-election in his Clacton constituency in which he was duly re-elected. As of July, the Metropolitan Police has been investigating four donations from George Cottrell for more than a year. Two people have been interviewed under caution.

In September 2026 Reform Head of Policy James Orr and Dan Jukes, an aide to Nigel Farage, appeared in undercover reporting showing Orr and Jukes arrange for an American company to fund three polls on behalf of the party, which would break campaign finance laws. Orr told the would-be donor: "We just don't have British resident donors, British entities, that would support us. That's the grim reality ... there are quite a few people in your position ... who can't declare [funding]." Jukes and Orr separately proposed ways that donations from inadmissible donors could be hidden through a British intermediary, which Jukes said that the party had done several times already. Orr said that "the reality is we could easily get away with it", and that the Electoral Commission was "so dumb and ineffective". Jukes said: "Those little clandestine projects are so valuable." Of the payments, Orr said that Farage "doesn't know, won't know. It's the kind of thing he would rather not know." After resigning as MP amid allegations regarding the Harborne gift, Farage met the undercover foreign donor in person to discuss a potential £500,000 donation via a British intermediary, and thanked him for paying for the polling.

Following the report both Orr and Jukes stepped down and Reform announced an internal probe into the matter. Jukes denied breaking any law. Orr said he would co-operate fully with Reform's internal investigation. Reform UK chair Lee Anderson said that there was "no chance" of either Jukes or Orr returning. Farage told the BBC that he "wasn't even listening" during the conversation with the donor. The Metropolitan Police launched a criminal investigation into the donations.

Amid the allegations Reform UK's standing in the polls dropped to 24% in September 2026 from 31% the September before, according to averages from Sky News. Nigel Farage's net approval fell from -2% to -30% over the same period. YouGov recorded their highest disapproval rating for Farage in over ten years of tracking at 69%.

=== Press bans ===
In a number of counties Reform UK has banned its councillors from speaking to local press. After taking control of Nottinghamshire County Council in May 2025, Reform UK banned its councillors from speaking to the Nottingham Post, and council officials were ordered not to send it press releases. According to The Times columnist Sean O'Neill, "this ominous move ... represents an attack on the democratic structures of this country's system of government". In October 2025, Reform also banned local councillors from speaking to the Leicester Gazette and the Kent Current, branding the Gazette as "fake news". Nation.Cymru news editor Emily Price reported that Reform was refusing to speak to their journalists, which she described as an "undemocratic Donald Trump-style wall of silence". The Nottingham Post initiated legal action against Reform UK to reverse its ban.

In May 2026, Reform UK councillors were told not to engage with local press after winning council control in Suffolk and Swindon. Ipswich Reform chair Shayne Pooley publicly stated that councillors will not respond to any media except GB News. On election day, only one Reform candidate in Ipswich agreed to be interviewed by the BBC.

After news broke on 29 April 2026 of a £5 million gift from Christopher Harborne, Farage scaled back press conferences, holding only two since then (one open only to local press) as of mid-June, having held 20 between January and April.

In September 2026, Reform UK revoked the press permits for its annual conference of at least eight journalists, including the Guardian journalist, Anna Isaac, who broke the news of the Harborne gift. National Union of Journalists general secretary Laura Davison stated: "Reports that Reform UK has chosen to ban journalists who have scrutinised the party from attending its conference are frustrating and concerning." Conservative leader Kemi Badenoch said this indicated that Reform would be "authoritarian and using state power actually to pursue opponents" if elected to government.

As of September 2026, Richard Tice and his lawyers have ignored over 40 attempts by Sunday Times Insight editor Gabriel Pogrund to contact him regarding his tax affairs.

== Representation ==
=== House of Commons ===
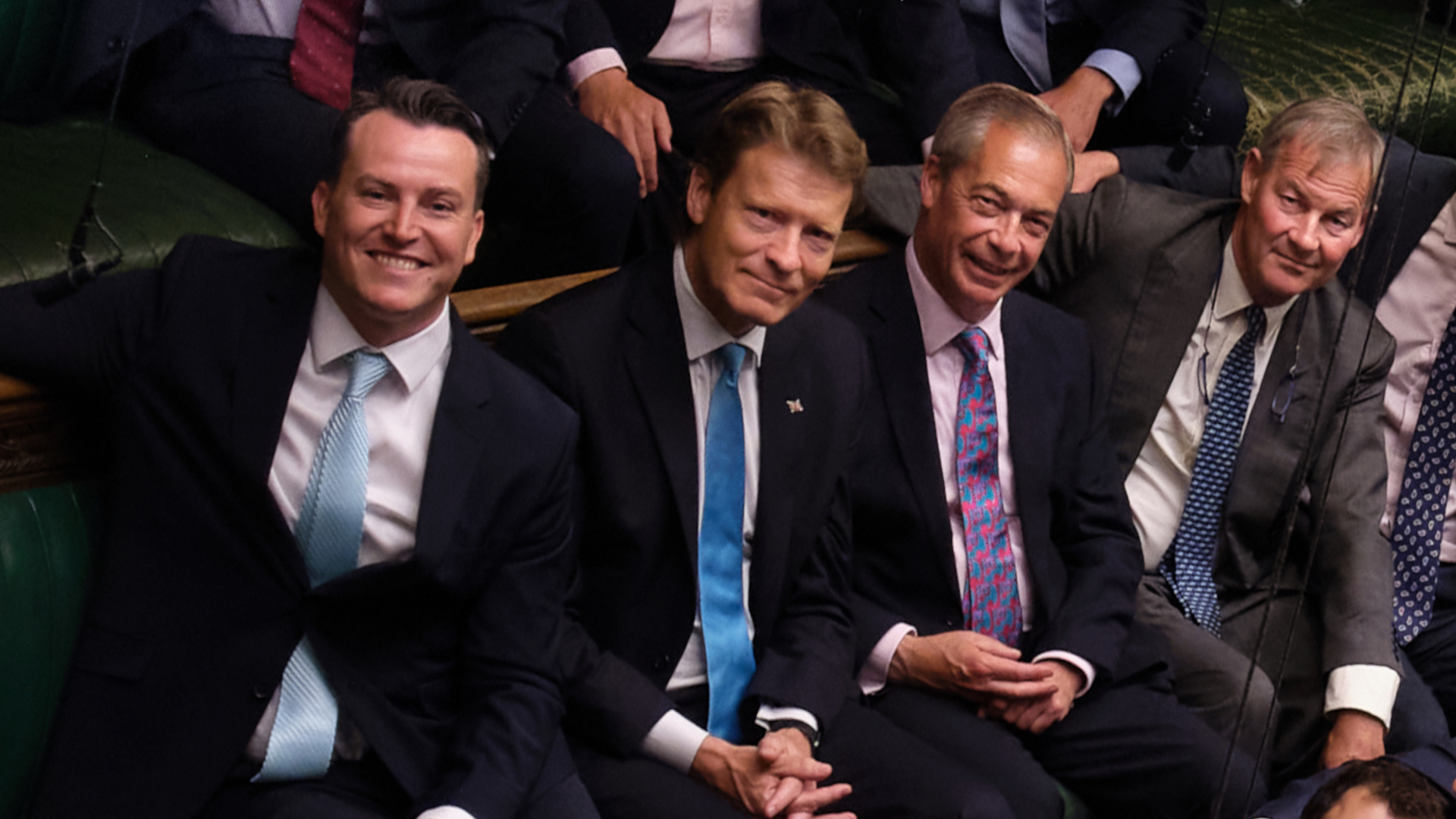
Reform UK MPs Nigel Farage (second from right), Richard Tice (second from left) with former Reform UK MPs Rupert Lowe (right), James McMurdock (left) in 2024

Lee Anderson, who was elected as the Conservative Party MP for Ashfield in the 2019 general election, defected to Reform UK in March 2024, giving the party its first MP. He was re-elected in the 2024 general election and joined by Nigel Farage, Richard Tice, Rupert Lowe, and James McMurdock, representing Clacton, Boston and Skegness, Great Yarmouth, and South Basildon and East Thurrock respectively.

Rupert Lowe was suspended from the party in March 2025 after criticising Farage's leadership, lowering the party's MPs to four. The number increased to five again after Sarah Pochin won the 2025 Runcorn and Helsby by-election. McMurdock stepped down from the party in July 2025, after previously admitting to business misconduct.

On 15 September, Danny Kruger, the Conservative MP for East Wiltshire, defected to Reform, bringing Reform's total MPs back up to 5 again after McMurdock stepped down in July. In January 2026, Conservative MPs Robert Jenrick, Andrew Rosindell and Suella Braverman defected to Reform, bringing the party's seats to eight with the additions of Newark, Romford and Fareham and Waterlooville.

=== House of Lords ===
In December 2025, Malcolm Offord defected from the Conservatives to Reform UK, becoming its first and only peer in the House of Lords, he retired his position in the Lords after being appointed the party's leader in Scotland.

=== European Parliament ===
In February 2019, nine MEPs, who had left UKIP in opposition to Gerard Batten's leadership, joined the party; by mid-April 2019, the number had increased to 14, all being members of the Europe of Freedom and Direct Democracy (EFDD) group in the European Parliament.

MEPs who joined the Brexit Party after foundation
Name	Constituency	First elected	Joined
Diane James	South East England	1 July 2014	5 February 2019
David Coburn	Scotland	1 July 2014	12 February 2019
Nigel Farage	South East England	10 June 1999	12 February 2019
Nathan Gill	Wales	1 July 2014	12 February 2019
Julia Reid	South West England	1 July 2014	12 February 2019
Tim Aker	East of England	1 July 2014	13 February 2019
Jonathan Bullock	East Midlands	28 July 2017	13 February 2019
Bill Etheridge	West Midlands	1 July 2014	13 February 2019
Paul Nuttall	North West England	14 July 2009	15 February 2019
Jill Seymour	West Midlands	1 July 2014	15 April 2019
Jane Collins	Yorkshire and the Humber	1 July 2014	15 April 2019
Margot Parker	East Midlands	1 July 2014	15 April 2019
Jonathan Arnott	North East England	1 July 2014	17 April 2019
Ray Finch	South East England	1 July 2014	17 April 2019

Only three of these incumbent MEPs − Farage, Gill and Bullock − were selected to stand for the Brexit Party in the 2019 election, which took place on 23 May 2019. Twenty-nine Brexit Party MEPs were elected to the European Parliament, including Tice and the former Conservative MP Ann Widdecombe, while Farage, Nathan Gill and Jonathan Bullock kept their seats. BBC News described the Brexit Party, which gained 31.6% of the vote in the UK, as "the clear winner in the UK's European elections."

The Brexit Party MEPs were not members of a group in the Parliament. The MEP Andrew England Kerr was expelled from the party on 29 September 2019 over a potential conflict of interest. Farage explained that England Kerr made "comments about a business and a product that he has a direct financial investment in and we think that is unacceptable." The MEP Louis Stedman-Bryce resigned on 19 November 2019 in response to "The Brexit Party's recent decision to select a Scottish candidate who has openly posted homophobic views".

=== London Assembly ===
In the 2024 London Assembly election, Alex Wilson was elected as a London-wide member for the London Assembly.

On 4 October 2025, Keith Prince, the Conservative London Assembly member for Havering and Redbridge, defected to Reform.

=== Senedd ===
On 15 May 2019, four Members originally elected or co-opted for UKIP (Caroline Jones, Mandy Jones, David Rowlands and Mark Reckless) joined the Brexit Party, with Reckless being appointed as leader of their group, which was known as Plaid Brexit in Welsh. In May 2020 Reckless said that Nigel Farage is "consulted over key decisions... but he doesn't micro-manage us here", and that in the 2021 Senedd election it would campaign to scrap the current system of devolution and replace it with a directly elected first minister accountable to Welsh MPs. This policy announcement triggered the departure from the party's group in the Senedd of Caroline Jones, Mandy Jones and David Rowlands. They formed a new members group, the Independent Alliance for Reform, which sought to reform rather than abolish the Senedd. The remaining Brexit Party Senedd group member, Mark Reckless, left to join the Abolish the Welsh Assembly Party.

Reform UK contested the 2021 Senedd election on a platform of ending lockdowns, investing in the NHS, giving parents greater control over education, building the M4 relief road, and cutting local government, but did not win any seats, although they got a one percent vote share for regional and constituency lists.

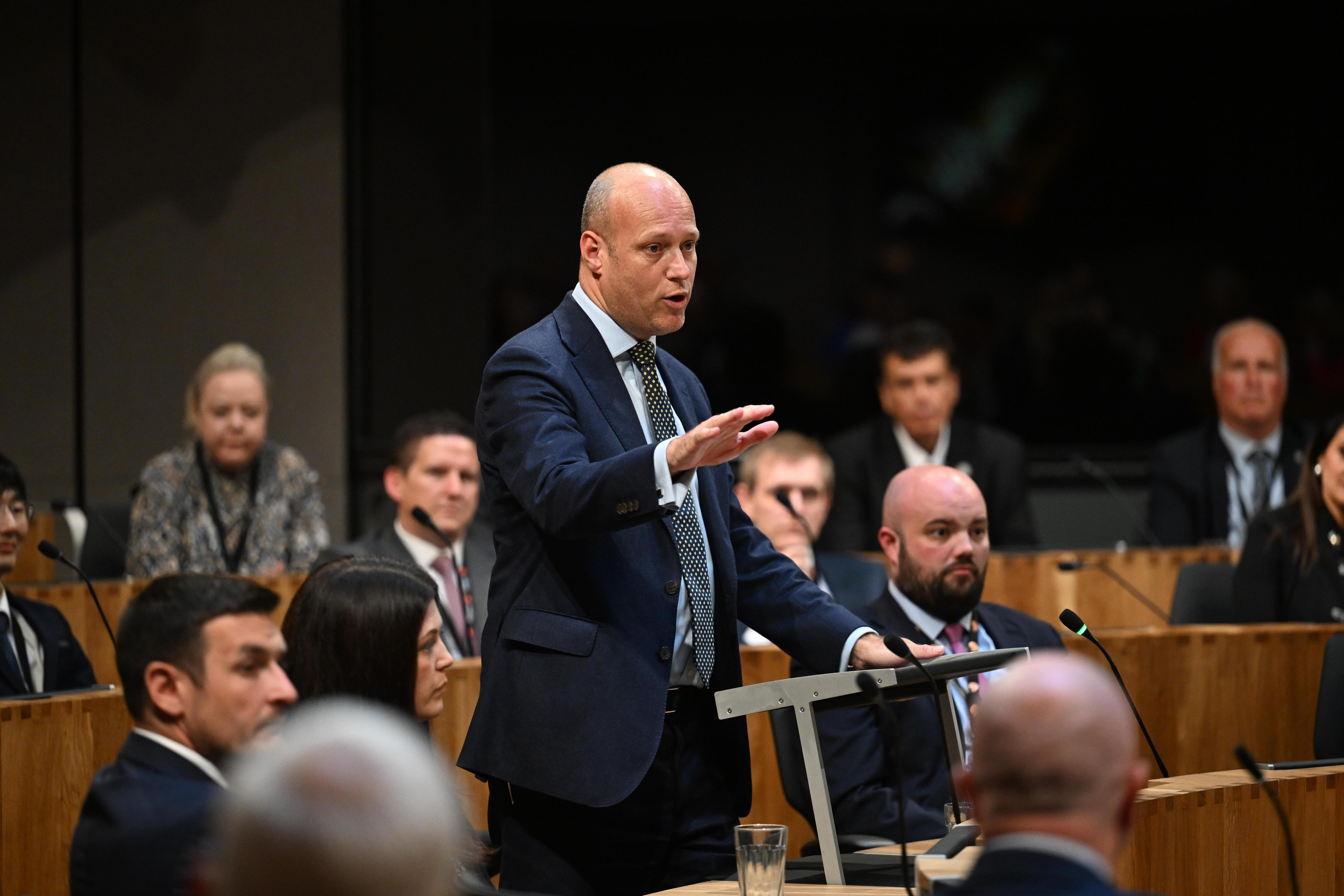
Former leader of Reform UK Wales, Dan Thomas, with Reform UK Members of the Senedd in 2026.

On 22 July 2025, Laura Anne Jones, then a Welsh Conservative member of the Senedd for South Wales East, defected to the party, becoming their first representative in the Senedd since the party was renamed to Reform UK. This decision came while she was under investigation by the Senedd standards watchdog due to reports of bullying and false expenses claims.

On 20 January 2026, James Evans, then a Welsh Conservative member of the Senedd for Brecon and Randorshire, had the whip removed following Evans confirming to Darren Millar that he was in talks with Reform UK about a possible defection. Evans subsequently sat as an independent for 16 days before announcing his defection to Reform UK on 5 February 2026.

On 7 May 2026, following the 2026 Senedd election, Reform UK became the second largest party in the Senedd after Plaid Cymru, winning 34 of the 96 seats up for election. Dan Thomas subsequently became the leader of the opposittion in Wales and formed the Thomas shadow cabinet.

On 15 September 2026, Dan Thomas resigned as leader of Reform UK Wales after being arrested on suspicion of assault and controlling or coercive behavior. Thomas said that he had "done nothing wrong". Gwent Police confirmed that a 45-year-old man from Aberbargoed had been released on bail. That same day, Sarah Cooper-Lesadd, then a Reform UK Wales member of the Senedd for Pen-y-bont Bro Morgannwg, defected to Plaid Cymru. On 17 November, the investigation against Thomas was dropped by Gwent Police, who confirmed that the 45-year-old man was "released with no further action".

On 21 September 2026, Helen Jenner was unveiled as the successor to Dan Thomas following a leadership contest by Jason O'Connell. Jenner had previously served as Thomas' deputy leader. The next day, Laura Anne Jones was announced as Jenner's deputy leader.

=== Scottish Parliament ===
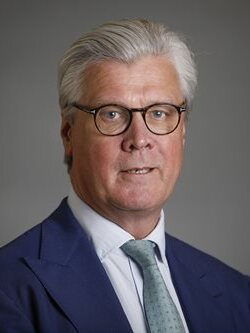
Malcolm Offord leads Reform UK in Scotland

On 11 January 2021, Michelle Ballantyne, an MSP for South Scotland, joined Reform UK. She first sat as a Conservative but left the party in 2020. Ballantyne continued to sit with the party until the 2021 Scottish Parliament election in May, when she lost her seat to a candidate from the Scottish Conservatives. She resigned as the party's leader in Scotland in February 2022.

On 27 August 2025, Graham Simpson, an MSP for Central Scotland, defected from the Conservatives and joined Reform.

On 7 May 2026, in the 2026 Scottish Parliament election, Reform UK became the joint-second largest party in the Scottish Parliament, tied with Scottish Labour and behind the Scottish National Party, with 17 of the 129 seats up for election.

On 19 October 2026, Amanda Bland resigned from Reform UK to become an independent, resulting in the party becoming the third largest in the parliament, holding 16 seats.

=== Police and crime commissioners ===
On 4 August 2025, Rupert Matthews, the Leicestershire Police and Crime Commissioner and a former MEP for East Midlands, defected from the Conservatives and joined Reform.

In July 2026, Reform candidate Colin Sutton won the 2026 Norfolk Police and Crime Commissioner by-election, gaining the seat from Labour.

=== Local government ===
Map of council control after the United Kingdom local elections in 2025 (left) and 2026 (right). Reform UK in light blue

As of March 2024, two-thirds of Reform UK's local councillors were former councillors of the Conservative party who defected over to Reform UK. In October 2024, Farage called on Conservative Party councillors to join Reform UK, saying that he was contacting over a thousand of them and that "a huge number of them genuinely agree with us and what we stand for".

Reform won a by-election in the Marton ward of Blackpool Council on 3 October 2024, with its vote share rising from 9.5% (in the 2023 election) to 38.8%. In October 2024, two Scottish Conservative Party councillors, Mark Findlater and Laurie Carnie, serving on Aberdeenshire Council defected to the party and became Reform UK's first local representatives in Scotland. As of 17 March 2025, prior to the local elections of that year, 15 of the 113 Reform councillors had been won through elections, with the remainder defecting from other parties, the majority of which were from the Conservatives. In June 2025, a Scottish Labour councillor, Jamie McGuire, from Renfrewshire Council defected to Reform along with a third former Scottish Conservatives councillor, Duncan Massey, from Aberdeen.

Reform polled in first place and won 677 seats in the 2025 local elections. Within six weeks the number of Reform councillors had fallen to 668 due to five suspensions from the party, and four newly appointed councillors stepping down from the role, which led to two by-election losses (one to the Conservatives and the other to the Lib Dems). Two further by-elections were scheduled for July and August 2025.

Within months of the election, issues emerged for Reform UK party groups on local authorities. On 18 October 2025, The Guardian released video footage of an online meeting of Reform UK councillors where Linden Kemkaran, leader of Kent County Council, swore at some of her colleagues who criticised her leadership. After the leak she called those responsible cowards. Four councillors were suspended as a result of the leak. On Cornwall Council, the leader and deputy leader of the group resigned. Other local authorities where elected councillors who have left include City of Doncaster Council, Northumberland County Council, Nottinghamshire County Council, Staffordshire County Council, and Shropshire Council.

Reform had the most councillors elected in the 2026 local elections, gaining 1,451 seats.

== Ideology and platform ==
Reform UK is a radical right and anti-immigration political party. It is right-wing populist (Note: Also described as simply populist as well as populist radical right) and far-right. (Note: Also described by media as hard-right) It is also neoliberal populist, right-wing nationalist, and national conservative. Reform UK rejects the descriptor of far-right, threatening legal action against media using it, while Farage has personally described Reform as occupying the "genuine centre-right" and as a "brand new Conservative movement".

In March 2024, the BBC called the party far-right but soon retracted its statement and apologised to Reform UK, writing that describing the party as far-right "fell short of our usual editorial standards". Commenting on the incident, professor of politics Tim Bale wrote that labelling Reform UK as far-right is unhelpful, and that it "causes too visceral a reaction and at the same time is too broad to be meaningful", as an umbrella term. Bale stated that the importance of distinguishing between the "extreme right" and "populist radical right", and stated that parties described as far right should instead be "more precisely labelled". Bale later described party leader Farage as the "British representative of the populist radical right in Europe", while being placed "on the more moderate side of far-right parties in Europe." In 2025 Bale stated that "most political scientists" would say that Reform is a far-right party, "if you accept that as the umbrella term and then say they're populist radical right".

In Parliamentary Affairs, Bennie & Widfeldt described the party as fitting "into a broader European family of radical right parties working within democratic structures", with the radical right being a subset of far-right. In British Politics, Hayton wrote that the party had evolved into a "fully-fledged right-wing populist party" that "can be most sensibly classified as a populist radical right party", having moved beyond the single-issue politics of Brexit while retaining a Eurosceptic legacy. Hayton placed this as "outside of the mainstream right and as part of the far right, but distinguishes it from the extreme right elements of the far right." In the Journal of Contemporary European Studies, Shuttleworth, Brown & Mondon stated that the categorisation of Reform UK as far-right had been regularly left out from academic and public discourse, despite its "clear credentials", and questioned whether the BBC apology or the party's opposition to label was a reason for such exclusion. Since the apology, the party has also been described as far-right in the Journal of European Public Policy, Journal of Cultural Economy, Journal of Elections, Public Opinion and Parties, Ethnic and Racial Studies, Nations and Nationalism and Studies in Conflict & Terrorism.

In the British Journal of Politics and International Relations, Newton categorised the party as right-wing populist that strategically utilises radical right populist ideology, differentiating it from minor far-right parties in the UK engaged in similar anti-migration activism. Writing in The Political Quarterly, Wraight described Reform UK as having rallied voters behind their brand of "little Englander conservatism", as populist rivals to the right of the Conservative Party. Writing in the magazine The Spectator, Ross Clark argued that Reform had become a left-wing party, by attracting disillusioned Labour voters with stances on restoring welfare benefits, nationalising the steel industry with 50% of utilities and increasing government spending (including the NHS).

=== 2019 European Parliament election platform as the Brexit Party ===
The party's constitution was published by the Electoral Commission as a result of a freedom of information request in May 2019. It described the party as seeking to "promote and encourage those who aspire to improve their personal situation and those who seek to be self-reliant, whilst providing protection for those genuinely in need; favour the ability of individuals to make decisions in respect of themselves; seek to diminish the role of the State; lower the burden of taxation on individuals and businesses."

Social Democratic Party politician Patrick O'Flynn, who was elected as a UKIP MEP under Farage's leadership and supported the Brexit Party in the 2019 European elections, commented on the constitution's description of the party as following classical liberalism and described them as having a Thatcherite ideological core. James Glancy, one of the party's MEPs, has compared the party to the Referendum Party, being a "united and diverse group of people from different political backgrounds".

The party's first non-Brexit-related policy was announced on 4 June 2019: a proposition to transform British Steel into a partly worker-owned company, in what was described as "a hybrid of Conservative and Labour policy". The party also supported cutting Britain's foreign aid budget, scrapping the proposed High Speed 2 project and introducing free WiFi on all British public transport. The party also said it would scrap all interest paid on student tuition fees, reimburse graduates for historic interest payments made on their loans, and pledged to abolish inheritance tax.

In July 2019, the Brexit Party signed a cross-party declaration alongside the Liberal Democrats, Green Party of England and Wales, and the Scottish National Party, calling for first-past-the-post voting to be replaced by a proportional system for Westminster elections.

=== 2019 UK general election platform as the Brexit Party ===
On 22 November 2019, the Brexit Party set out its policy proposals for the 2019 UK general election. Its key policies for the election included:

- No extension to the Brexit transition period
- No privatisation of the NHS
- Reducing immigration
- Cutting VAT on domestic fuel
- Banning the UK exporting its waste
- Providing free broadband in deprived regions
- Scrapping the television licence fee
- Abolishing inheritance tax
- Scrapping High Speed 2 (HS2)
- Abolishing interest on student loans
- Changing planning to help house building
- Reforming the Supreme Court
- Reform the voting system to make it more representative
- Abolish the House of Lords
- Making MPs who switch parties subject to recall petitions
- Reform the postal voting system to combat fraud
- Introduce citizens' initiatives to allow people to call referendums, subject to a 5 million threshold of registered voter signatures and time limitations on repeat votes

=== 2020 to 2023 as Reform UK ===
Following the UK's departure from the European Union on 31 January 2020, Farage sought a new right-wing populist project for the party under its new name of Reform UK, opposing further COVID-19 restrictions, paralleling right-wing populist anti-lockdown sentiments in other countries.

At the party conference in October 2021, leader Richard Tice criticised the Conservative Party as a party of "high tax". He said that his party would stand on a low-tax and low-regulation platform. The party supports raising the threshold at which people start paying income tax from £12,500 to £20,000, and exempting the smallest businesses from corporation tax. He has said that energy companies should be owned by the government or British pension funds to stop profits going abroad.

In January 2023, Reform called for an end to foreign ownership of critical national infrastructure such as water, though as part of its plans private firms would continue to supply and distribute water.

=== 2024 UK general election platform as Reform UK ===
On 17 June 2024, Reform UK launched their manifesto, Our Contract with You, which Farage presented during an interview. The key policy proposals included:

- Tax cuts, including: raising the minimum threshold of income tax to £20,000, raising the higher rate threshold from £50,271 to £70,000, abolishing stamp duty for properties below £750,000, and abolishing taxes on inheritances below £2 million.
- Reducing legal immigration by freezing "non-essential" immigration, and eliminating illegal immigration by ending the settlement of any illegal immigrants, sending back to France migrants who arrive on boats crossing the English Channel. To encourage companies to employ British workers, they would raise employers National Insurance to 20% for foreign workers.
- Scrapping and rejecting net zero as "the greatest act of negligence". Reform UK wants to increase drilling for gas and oil, seeing their expansion as growth opportunities. It would also "fast-track" clean nuclear energy and shale gas licences. It pledges to support the environment with tree planting, recycling and fewer single use plastics.
- Eradicating waiting lists within two years by giving the NHS an extra £17bn a year and increasing the use of the private sector in the NHS, giving tax breaks to nurses and doctors to increase their number, and other measures including less tax for private healthcare and insurance, offering vouchers for private healthcare and looking to France's insurance-based health model.
- Increasing the number of police officers by 40,000 in five years, "clamp down on all crime and antisocial behaviour", by instituting zero tolerance policing.
- Introducing a "patriotic curriculum" in schools, such that, for example, where imperialism or slavery is covered, examples are also given of non-European instances. "Transgender ideology" would be banned, no gender questioning, social transitioning or "pronoun swapping" would be allowed in schools, universities would have to offer two-year courses to reduce student debt. Scrap interest on student loans and extend the loan capital repayment periods to 45 years. Encouraging the use of private schools via a 20% tax relief on private schooling.
- Increasing defence spending to 2.5% of GDP in three years, and then to 3% over the following three. 30,000 additional people would be recruited to join the army.
- Focus on new rail and road infrastructure in coastal regions, Wales, the North and the Midlands. Public utilities and critical infrastructure would come under 50% public ownership, the other 50% being owned by UK pension fund.
- Increasing the farming budget to £3bn, focus on small farms, bring young people into farming.
- Stopping EU fleets taking British fishing quotas, ban massive supertrawlers, and other fisheries measures.
- Replacing the existing second chamber, the House of Lords, with a more democratic smaller alternative, having a referendum on the replacement of first-past-the-post voting with a system of proportional representation.
- Eliminating the TV licence fee.
- Leaving the European Convention on Human Rights.
- Immediately cutting the rate of corporation tax from 25% to 20% and then further reduce corporation tax to 15% in the third year of parliament.
- £150 billion per year in spending reductions, including public services and working-age benefits.

Reform UK said that the total cost of its manifesto would be £140 billion but say that they would raise £150 billion. According to Reform UK, this money would be raised from the scrapping of net zero subsidies, the ending of payments of interest on quantitative easing reserves to banks, the halving of foreign aid, cuts to working age benefits and other public spending reductions. The party said that it would "cut bureaucracy […] without touching frontline services", while the Institute for Fiscal Studies said that the savings required "would almost certainly require substantial cuts to the quantity or quality of public services" and that the sums of the costs of tax cuts and spending increases and savings proposed "do not add up" and were based on "extremely optimistic assumptions".

The party's manifesto was criticised in a 2024 article by John Pring as threatening the rights of disabled people and as posing significant safeguarding risks to benefit claimants.

Analysis in 2024 found that Reform UK's tax plans disproportionately benefit high earners. Farage said that his plans to raise the minimum threshold at which workers start paying tax from £12,571 to £20,000, would result in millions of low-paid workers not paying tax altogether. Reform UK wants to raise the higher rate threshold of tax from £50,271 to £70,000, which would result in a tax cut of close to £6,000 for the top 10% of earners. According to analysis for Sky News this would far outweigh any benefit to the lowest earners.

=== 2025 ===
In April 2025, Reform called for the nationalisation of the steel plant in Scunthorpe and government take-over of two electric arc furnaces at Liberty Steel's plant in Rotherham.

In September 2025, Reform said they would abolish indefinite leave to remain. Reform also proposed significant reforms to disability benefits, primarily focused on reducing the welfare bill by tightening eligibility and reassessment processes, particularly for those with less severe or non-serious conditions. The party aims to move over a million people back into work, suggesting that for those considered fit to work, benefits would be withdrawn if they decline two job offers or fail to find employment within four months. They argue that work itself can be beneficial for mental health.

Reform UK has echoed Trump's "Make America Great Again" slogan, using "make Britain great again", and has set up its own Department of Government Efficiency (DOGE), mirroring the initiative by the second Trump administration to cut government spending, which as of 25 March 2025 was led by Elon Musk.

Policies on immigration and asylum include: leaving the European Convention on Human Rights (ECHR); repealing the Human Rights Act 1998 and replacing it with a "British Bill of Rights"; disapplying the 1951 Refugee Convention, the UN Convention Against Torture, and the Council of Europe Anti-Trafficking Convention (ECAT); creating detention powers without Hardial Singh constraints; passing an illegal migration (mass deportation bill) and deny asylum for illegal immigrants. Reform said in November it would remove the rights of EU citizens to claim benefits, which would save £6.4 billion for 2025 rising to £10 billion by the end of the decade.

=== Climate change ===
A November 2024 poll conducted by YouGov found that Reform UK voters are twice as likely as the general public to believe that climate change is not caused by human activity.

A policy document named "Reform is Essential" published in late 2022 contained a subchapter named "An honest debate on climate change" in which it said among other things: "Reform UK fully accepts that climate change is real, after all it has happened for millions of years based on multiple factors completely outside human control or influence. Warming has of course taken place over the last approximately 150 years, with signs over recent years that it is now leveling off." In July 2024, in the run-up to the general election, the party broadly opposed the UK's legally binding net‑zero commitments, repeatedly pledging to scrap them, and according to The Guardian many of its leading members had downplayed or denied climate science consensus. This is a marked change in British politics which up until recently enjoyed cross-party consensus on achieving net zero. Before the 2024 election and following it, the party attracted several donors associated with the fossil fuel industry or climate scepticism, including David Lilley, Roger Nagioff and Fiona Cottrell.

In an interview with the BBC in October 2021, then party chairman, Richard Tice criticised the Conservative Party's plans to decarbonise the economy, saying: "It is not net zero – it is literally net stupid." Instead, he suggested that the UK should focus on exploiting reserves of shale gas. Tice repeated the same stance in April 2022 saying that the Conservative Party's climate policy was out of touch with their voters and that Reform wanted to "cut taxes, go for growth, become self-reliant and use our own shale gas." Reform UK's 2024 election manifesto rejected net zero and encouraged the use of fossil fuels.

In June 2024, Pallavi Sethi and Bob Ward of the Grantham Research Institute on Climate Change and the Environment (London School of Economics) at London School of Economics accused Reform UK and its leaders Nigel Farage and Richard Tice of promoting misinformation about climate change.

The Guardian reported in June 2024 that climate change deniers and sceptics were donating to Reform and Nigel Farage in 2024. The donors with stakes in the fossil fuel industry who were said to have donated were Terence Mordaunt and Jeremy Hosking. Donors who had donated to both The Global Warming Policy Foundation (GWPF) and Reform were Jon Moynihan, Nigel Vinson, and Michael Hintze.

In February 2025, Tice said: "There's no evidence that man-made CO2 is going to change climate change. Given that it's gone on for millions of years, it will go on for millions of years" and that there were "a thousand" scientists who agreed with him, which was "not a minority". Scientists told Sky News that his first point was "categorically wrong", "missing the point" and that the "evidence is clear", regarding the second point, 99% of scientific publications agree with the scientific consensus.

In March 2025, The New York Times reported: "Most of those bankrolling Reform in 2024 were multimillionaires, individuals and companies based in low-tax offshore countries, climate change sceptics, or those with investments in fossil fuels or other climate-polluting industries."

In June 2024, Reform UK had accepted "more than £2.3 million from oil and gas interests, highly polluting industries, and 'climate science deniers' since December 2019".

In April 2025, Farage said that the current government's net zero policy was "lunacy" and that "this could be the next Brexit", "where Parliament is so hopelessly out of touch with the country.” In response, the Secretary of State for Energy Security and Net Zero Ed Miliband accused him of peddling "nonsense and lies". In July 2025, Reform UK's Mayor of Greater Lincolnshire, Andrea Jenkyns, said, "Do I believe that climate change exists? No."

In July 2025, Richard Tice, Dame Andrea Jenkyns and Reform UK councillor Sean Matthews, who leads Lincolnshire County Council, launched a campaign opposing wind and solar farms and battery storage facilities, with Tice saying the campaign would use "every lever available" to stop these developments.

In November 2025, when asked by Sky News if humans have impacted the climate, Tice said: "Possibly, but if so, a very modest percentage." He accepted the need to update infrastructure in Britain to cope with a changing climate. When asked whether he accepted that the climate was warming at an unprecedented rate, Tice said: "From the data that I've seen, from previous ice core data, I think the answer to that is questionable." NASA has stated "human activity is the principal cause" of unprecedentedly fast warming and 234 UN scientists from the Intergovernmental Panel on Climate Change have said it is "unequivocal" that humans have caused "widespread and rapid changes".

=== 2026 ===
In February 2026, Robert Jenrick said that Reform would reinstate the two child benefit cap, as part of an attempt to be more "fiscally responsible" in their policies. This came four months after Rachel Reeves announced that the benefit cap was to be abolished, and was a change of policy, it previously having been to remove it.

In 2026, Reform published draft legislation, Cryptoassets and Digital Finance Bill, since removed from the Reform UK website.

In August 2026 Richard Tice said: "Climate change has always happened. It always will. Maybe the smarter thing to do is to adapt to it than think arrogantly that you can stop it. When it's a bit warm, let's enjoy it. And if it means that English wine and sparkling wine gets better and better, fantastic."

Also in August 2026, Reform UK proposed cutting £50 billion in welfare/benefits if it were in government. It estimates 2.89 million people would have their disability payments' removed, or altered under plans to abolish Personal Independence Payments (Pip) for working age people. Reform UK proposed making companies pay for any employees off sick for the first two years. A new system, known as a Health Security Allowance, would replace both Pip and the Universal Credit health element.

=== Foreign policy ===
Farage supported Israeli airstrikes against Iran during the Twelve-Day War in 2025, arguing Israel had "no choice" in the situation. In June 2025, Farage said he was opposed to "de-escalation" with Iran and instead wanted to see its "bloody awful regime" be "wiped out".

Farage initially supported Israel and the US in the 2026 Iran war. He criticised the decision by the prime minister, Keir Starmer, for the UK to not be involved in offensive strikes against Iran and to deny the USA access to UK military bases to enable them. In response, Farage said "The Prime Minister needs to change his mind on the use of our military bases and back the Americans in this vital fight against Iran!" He also stated his support for the US achieving regime change in Iran, one of their stated objectives for the conflict. However, shortly after, Farage reversed his position to say Britain should not get "involved in another foreign war", while Jenrick said that Reform's position was that "this war needs to come to an end as soon as possible because it is making Britain poorer", criticising the "liberal interventionists of the early 21st century".

== Voting history ==
In October 2024, all Reform UK MPs voted against the Employment Rights Bill. A policy within the bill is workers' prevention from harassment, which has been heavily criticised by Farage and other Reform UK politicians, who have referred to it as a "banter ban". The general secretary of the Trades Union Congress (TUC), Paul Nowak, said on 28 April 2025, "The likes of Reform are defying their supporters by voting against improvements to workers' rights at every stage."

In January 2025, all Reform UK MPs voted for an amendment to the Children's Wellbeing and Schools Bill regarding a new national inquiry into grooming gangs. The amendment was intended to block the bill and its passing would have halted the bill's progress in Parliament. The Children's Wellbeing and Schools Bill aims to improve laws regarding home-schooling and support for children in care, improve school inspections and improve safeguards regarding private education facilities. The amendment to the bill was lost by 364 votes to 111, a majority of 253 against the amendment. Farage stated Reform UK will launch their own independent inquiry and pay for it themselves as the government one was rejected in order to respond to the "overwhelming demand" of the public to know the "full, unvarnished truth". Farage said the attacks were racist against white children by Pakistani rapists. Farage also criticised the Conservatives saying, "Talk is cheap. The Conservatives had 14 years in government to launch an inquiry. The establishment has failed the victims of grooming gangs on every level."

Of Reform UK's 8 MPs, 5 voted against the Terminally Ill Adults (End of Life) Bill and the other 3 did not vote.

== Funding and structure ==
In its early days, the Brexit Party officially had three members, who were Farage, Tracey Knowles and Mehrtash A'Zami. The party opted for signing up registered supporters rather than members. The party structure was criticised for not providing the party's over 115,000 paying registered supporters with any voting power to influence party policy; Farage retained a high level of control over decision-making, including hand-picking candidates himself. Since 2021, the party has options to become a member, rather than a supporter.

Initially the Reform UK party was a limited company (the Reform UK Party Limited) with fifteen shares. Farage owned 53% of the shares in the company, giving him a controlling majority. The other shareholders were Tice, who holds about a third, and Chief Executive Paul Oakden and Party Treasurer Mehrtash A'Zami who each held less than seven percent. In August 2024 Paul Oakden was removed and Farage took over his shares, giving him 60% ownership. As of 2025, ownership of the party was transferred from Farage to a new business legally constituted as Reform 2025 Limited, a company limited by guarantee, replacing the original company which was controlled by Farage as majority shareholder. The directors and guarantors of the new company are Farage and Zia Yusuf, who will effectively control the new company. The business's filing stated that it had no "person with significant control".

In 2019 Farage said the party would largely be funded by small donations and that they raised "£750,000 in donations online, all in small sums of less than £500" in their first ten days. The party also accepts large donations. He further said that the party would not be taking money from the key former UKIP funder Arron Banks. Farage personally faced questions during the 2019 electoral campaign after Channel 4 News revealed undeclared travel and accommodation benefits provided by Banks before Farage joined the Brexit Party, and on 21 May 2019 the European Parliament formally opened an investigation. In response to the reporting, the Brexit Party banned Channel 4 News from its events.

In 2019, £6.4m was donated to the party by Christopher Harborne, and £200,000 by Jeremy Hosking, a former donor to the Conservative Party. 2023 donations included £200,000 from Terence Mordaunt's company First Corporate Consultants Ltd.

Two days before the 2019 European election, Farage accused the Electoral Commission of "interfering in the electoral process" after the independent watchdog visited the Brexit Party headquarters for "active oversight and regulation" of party funding. Official donations of £500 or more must be given by a "permissible donor", who should either be somebody listed on the British electoral roll or a business registered at Companies House and operating in Britain. When asked if the party took donations in foreign currency, Farage replied: "Absolutely not, we only take sterling – end of conversation." Shadow Chancellor John McDonnell called for "a full and open and transparent, independent inquiry into the funding of Mr Farage". The Electoral Commission reported in July 2019 that following its visit it made recommendations to the party for more robust internal controls on permissible donations, as those in place had not been adequate, and that the party had returned a donation of £1,000 whose source could not be identified as acceptable.

In May 2024, The Guardian said that 80% of the party's funding, in loans and donations, came from Tice. It reported Tice as saying that the Conservatives spend £35 million annually, while Reform spends less than £1.5 million.

On 12 June 2025, openDemocracy reported that "Reform has received almost £5m from wealthy donors since 2023, including those with links to fossil fuels, the financial services industry and tax havens". Around a quarter of donations have been from former Conservative Party donors and Reform UK has an unusually high number of overseas donors with connections to tax havens.

In the first three months of 2026, cryptocurrency tycoons, made several large donations to Reform UK: Harborne donated a further £3 million, and Ben Delo, billionaire co-founder of BitMEX, donated £4 million.

=== Delo and Harborne record donations ===
On 11 September 2026, after allegations of illegal funding for Reform UK, Ben Delo donated a further £36 million, the largest donation to a political party in British history to that date, beating the previous record of £10 million to the Conservatives in 2023. The following day, Christopher Harborne matched Delo's £36 million donation. The £72 million in donations exceeded total donations to all UK political parties combined in 2025, and was far in excess of the roughly £25 million given to other parties in 2026 so far, and the £43 million that Labour has received from trade unions since 2020. Delo said that he made the donation because he wanted a "fair fight and a level playing field".

The size of the donations led to calls from the Liberal Democrats, the Green Party, and Unite general secretary Sharon Graham for a cap on political donations by a single donor. Some MPs, including Stella Creasy, had made proposals for such changes earlier in the month. Conservative shadow foreign secretary Tom Tugendhat warned of an "Americanisation of politics where money just sort of runs free". Liberal Democrat spokesperson Lisa Smart accused Nigel Farage of "buying his way into power". Trades Union Congress general secretary Paul Nowak said the government must "stop the super-rich corrupting our politics". In a 14 September YouGov poll, 60% of respondents supported a cap on donations from individuals and entities, and 22% were opposed.

Delo and Harborne had both lived outside the UK until earlier in 2026. In March 2026, the government had announced legislation to cap donations from foreign residents at £100,000 per year, including for the first year after their return. The legislation was still in Parliament as of September 2026, but is due to apply retroactively to all donations made since its announcement. Delo had said in April that he would return to the UK, and Harborne is believed to have registered his residence in June. Nigel Farage said the donations were "compliant with the law today", but declined to say whether they would be permitted under the proposed changes.

=== Membership ===
In June 2019, the Brexit Party reportedly had 115,000 paying supporters, though the party did not have an official membership.

During the week after the 3 June 2024 announcement of Farage's resumption of party leadership, ITV News reported that party membership increased by 50% to 45,000. By September of that year, the party said it had 80,000 members, and they hit 100,000 by the end of November. The party launched an online tracker on 23 December 2024 as it approached overtaking the number of Conservative members; it had 120,549 at noon of that day. On 26 December, the party said it had surpassed the Conservative party's most recently published total of 131,680, making it the second-largest party by membership. On 10 February, the party hit 200,000 members. During the fallout from the dispute around Rupert Lowe in March, those around Lowe claimed that as many as 7,000 members had resigned in protest, though Reform denied this. Following an incline to over 230,000 members up to May, the membership figures have stagnated and dropped slightly since.

As of January 2025, the party has 7,800 members in Wales. In June 2025, the party said it had over 15,000 members in London and 11,000 members in Scotland. In Scotland, the party claims to be the third-biggest, beating the Scottish Conservative total of 6,941 in January 2025.

According to research by Tim Bale and the Party Members Project done just after the 2024 election, Reform members are similar to those of other parties. The average age is 61 with very few between 18–24 and almost half of its members are over 65. Members are predominantly from the middle class, and has a substantial share of its membership in the Midlands and North. Nearly all voted leave, and 90% of them consider themselves as being some level of right-wing.

As of 10 June 2025, the membership had dropped from 237,099 to 234,175 in a week. This followed newly elected Reform UK MP Sarah Pochin's Commons maiden speech in which she asked if the UK should ban the burqa for public safety as France, Denmark and Belgium had done.

As of 29 August 2025, the party had 237,000 members and 450 branches, up from 80,000 members and no branches at the same time in the previous year.

As of 12 December 2025, Reform UK said it had over 268,000 members, while according to The Times the Labour Party's membership had fallen to below 250,000. At the time, standard annual membership of Reform cost £25 compared to £70.50 for Labour.

=== Governing board ===
The six members joining the party leader and chairman to form the inaugural Reform UK Board were announced on 22 August 2025.

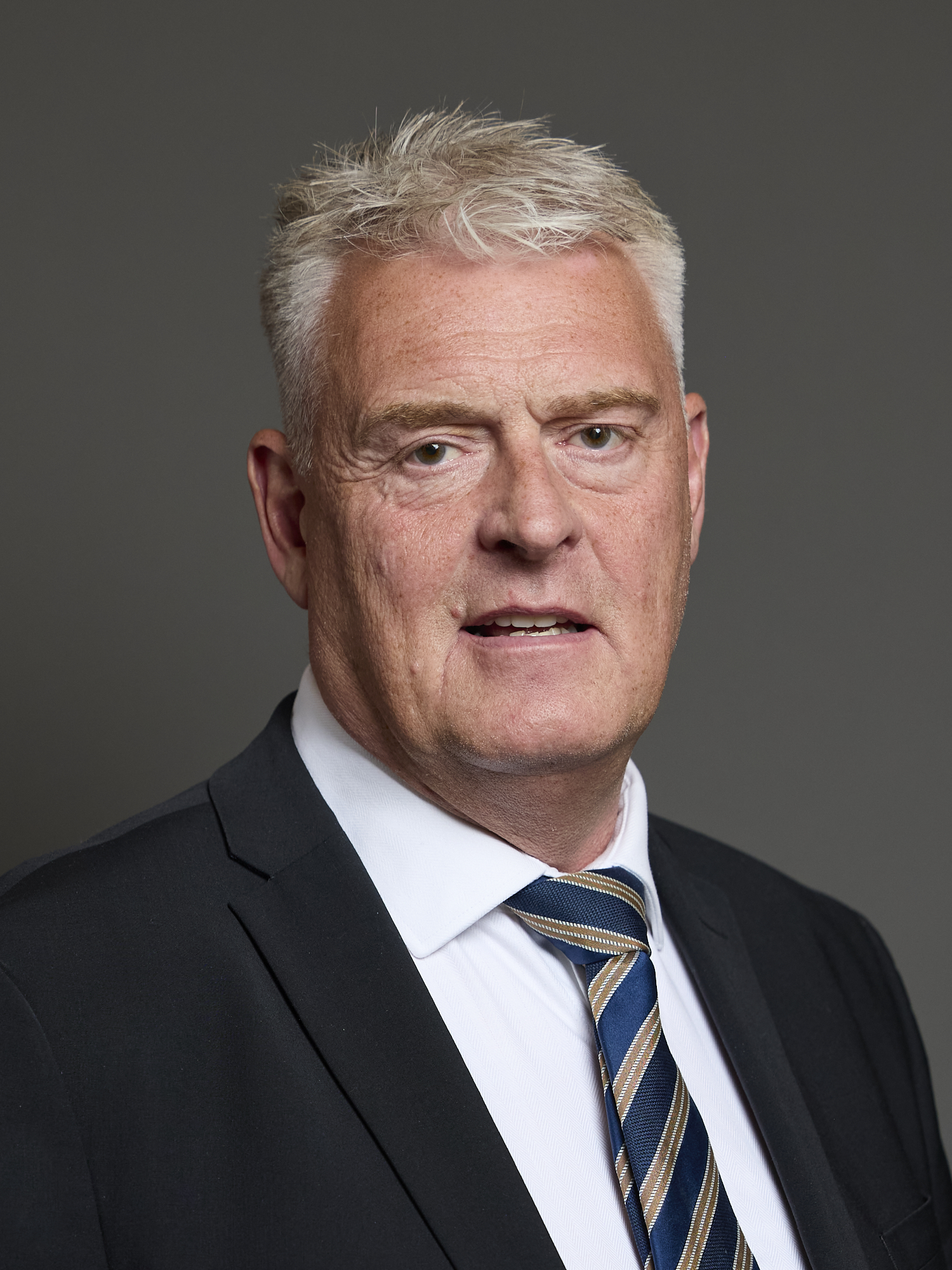
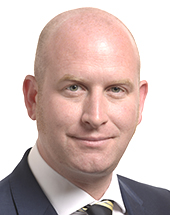
Reform UK's Chairman, Lee Anderson (left) and its Vice Chairman, Paul Nuttall (right)

Board
Office	Incumbent	Selection method
Leader of Reform UK	Nigel Farage	In office since prior to adoption of party constitution
Chairman of Reform UK	Lee Anderson	Appointed by leader
Vice Chairman of Reform UK	Paul Nuttall	Appointed by leader
Board Member	Andrea Jenkyns	Appointed by leader
Board Member	Zia Yusuf	Appointed by leader
Board Member	Dan Barker	Elected by party members
Board Member	Darren Grimes	Elected by party members
Board Member	Gawain Towler	Elected by party members

== Leadership ==
=== Leaders ===
Reform UK has had three leaders. Catherine Blaiklock was its first leader, in early 2019. Nigel Farage was leader from March 2019 until March 2021, when he resigned and Richard Tice took on the role. On 3 June 2024 it was announced that Tice had invited Farage to return as leader, an offer Farage accepted.

Leader (Birth–Death)		Portrait	Took office	Left office	Tenure length	Deputy Leader(s)	Chair	Vice-Chair
1	Catherine Blaiklock (born 1963)		20 January 2019	20 March 2019	60 days	Vacant	Vacant	Vacant
2	Nigel Farage (born 1964)		22 March 2019	6 March 2021	1 year and 350 days	Vacant	Richard Tice (2019–2021)	Vacant
3	Richard Tice (born 1964)	Tice photographed from below	6 March 2021	3 June 2024	3 years and 90 days	David Bull (2021–2023); Ben Habib (2023–2024)	Vacant	Vacant
(2)	Nigel Farage (born 1964)		3 June 2024	Incumbent	2 years and 169 days	David Bull (2021–2023); Ben Habib (2023–2024)	Richard Tice (2024); Zia Yusuf (2024–2025); David Bull (2025–2026); Lee Anderson (2026–present)	Vacant
(2)	Nigel Farage (born 1964)		3 June 2024	Incumbent	2 years and 169 days	Richard Tice (2024–present)	Richard Tice (2024); Zia Yusuf (2024–2025); David Bull (2025–2026); Lee Anderson (2026–present)	Paul Nuttall (2025–present)

=== Scotland and Wales ===
In early 2026, after prolonged vacancies, Malcolm Offord was appointed leader in Scotland and Dan Thomas was appointed leader in Wales.

== Election results ==
=== 2019 European Parliament election as the Brexit Party ===
The Brexit Party stood candidates in Great Britain at the 2019 European Parliament election, including the former Conservative Party Minister of State, Ann Widdecombe, the journalist, Annunziata Rees-Mogg (a former Conservative general election candidate and the sister of the Conservative MP and Brexit advocate, Jacob Rees-Mogg), the Leave Means Leave co-founder, Richard Tice, the writers, Claire Fox and James Heartfield (both once part of the Revolutionary Communist Party and later writers for Spiked), Stuart Waiton (a fellow Spiked contributor) James Glancy, a former member of the Royal Marines and the Special Boat Service who was awarded the Conspicuous Gallantry Cross, Martin Daubney, a journalist and commentator, David Bull, author and television presenter, Brian Monteith, a former Conservative Party MSP, Rupert Lowe, a businessman and retired Rear Admiral Roger Lane-Nott. John Longworth, the former director-general of the British Chambers of Commerce, announced he would be standing as a candidate for the party on 15 April 2019. The party was not registered in Northern Ireland and did not field candidates there.

A survey of 781 Conservative Party councillors found that 40% planned to vote for the Brexit Party. On 17 April 2019, the former Labour and Respect Party MP George Galloway announced his support for the Brexit Party "for one-time only" in the 2019 European Parliament election. On 24 April, the political columnist Tim Montgomerie announced that he would vote for the party and endorsed Widdecombe's candidature, and the Conservative MP Lucy Allan described the candidates of the party as "fantastic". On 2 May, one of the party's candidates for the North West constituency, Sally Bate, resigned from the party in response to previous comments made by Claire Fox, the lead candidate in the constituency, on the Warrington bombings.

In May 2019, several polls forecast the party polling first for the European elections, though earlier polls had suggested it would come third to Labour and the Conservatives. The party held 14 seats, acquired through defections, going into the elections, and saw an increase of 15. It won five more seats than UKIP, had at the previous election, under Farage's leadership.

==== Results ====
The party won 29 seats in the election, becoming the biggest single party in the Ninth European Parliament. The CDU/CSU Union also won 29 seats in Germany, but it was an alliance and not a party. Three of the 29 resigned the whip in December 2019 to support the Conservative Party at the 2019 general election, while a fourth, John Longworth, was expelled for "repeatedly undermining" the party's election strategy.

Year	Leader	Share of votes	Seats	Position
2019	Nigel Farage	30.52%	29 / 73	1st

The 29 MEPs elected were as follows:

Name	Constituency	First elected
David Bull	North West England	23 May 2019
Jonathan Bullock	East Midlands	28 July 2017
Martin Daubney	West Midlands	23 May 2019
Nigel Farage	South East England	10 June 1999
Lance Forman	London	23 May 2019
Claire Fox	North West England	23 May 2019
Nathan Gill	Wales	1 July 2014
James Glancy	South West England	23 May 2019
Benyamin Habib	London	23 May 2019
Lucy Harris	Yorkshire and the Humber	23 May 2019
Michael Heaver	East of England	23 May 2019
Christina Jordan	South West England	23 May 2019
Andrew England Kerr	West Midlands	23 May 2019
John Longworth	Yorkshire and the Humber	23 May 2019
Rupert Lowe	West Midlands	23 May 2019
Belinda De Camborne Lucy	South East England	23 May 2019
Brian Monteith	North East England	23 May 2019
June Mummery	East of England	23 May 2019
Henrik Overgaard-Nielsen	North West England	23 May 2019
Matthew Patten	East Midlands	23 May 2019
Alexandra Phillips	South East England	23 May 2019
Jake Pugh	Yorkshire and the Humber	23 May 2019
Annunziata Rees-Mogg	East Midlands	23 May 2019
Robert Rowland	South East England	23 May 2019
Louis Stedman-Bryce	Scotland	23 May 2019
John Tennant	North East England	23 May 2019
Richard Tice	East of England	23 May 2019
James Wells	Wales	23 May 2019
Ann Widdecombe	South West England	23 May 2019

=== 2019 general election ===
On 19 April, Farage said that the party intended to stand candidates at the 2019 general election, but would not stand candidates against the 28 Eurosceptic Conservative MPs who opposed the Brexit withdrawal agreement. In the Peterborough by-election in June, the Brexit Party came second with 28% of the vote, 7% ahead of the Conservatives and 2% behind Labour.

Following Boris Johnson's election as Prime Minister, Farage unveiled the names of 635 general election candidates for the Brexit Party, including himself. On 8 September 2019, Farage wrote an article in the The Sunday Telegraph and the party took out advertisements in Sunday newspapers offering an electoral pact with the Conservative Party in the forthcoming general election, whereby the Brexit Party would not be opposed by the Conservatives in traditional Labour Party seats in the north of England, the Midlands and Wales, and the Brexit Party would not contest seats in which they could split the Leave vote. Farage wrote that Boris Johnson should ask himself "does he want to sign a non-aggression pact with me and return to Downing Street?"

Constituencies, highlighted, which the Brexit Party contested at the 2019 general election

Farage's proposition was rejected by Johnson. On 11 November, Farage said that his party would not stand in any of the 317 seats won by the Conservatives at the last election. Conservative Party chairman James Cleverly welcomed this, although he stated that the parties had not been in contact. Newsnight reported that conversations between members of the Brexit Party and the pro-Brexit Conservative group, the European Research Group (ERG) had led to this decision.

The Brexit Party is reported to have requested that Boris Johnson publicly state he would not extend the Brexit transition period beyond the planned date of 31 December 2020 and that he wished for a Canada-style free-trade agreement with the EU. Johnson did make a statement covering these two issues, something which Farage referenced as key when announcing he was standing down some candidates, but both the Brexit Party and the Conservatives denied that any deal was done between them. The decision to not run in those seats met with criticism by some Brexit Party supporters and candidates, and some candidates who had been selected to run for Conservative seats opted to run as independent candidates on a Pro-Brexit platform.

==== Results ====
The party failed to win any seats in the general election. Its best second places were in Barnsley Central, where Victoria Felton won 30.4% of the vote, and Barnsley East, where Jim Ferguson won 29.2%. High third places were in Hartlepool, where Richard Tice won 25.8% of the vote, and Kingston upon Hull West and Hessle, where Michelle Dewberry won 18%.

Election	Leader	Votes		Seats		Outcome
Election	Leader	No.	Share	Seats won	±	Outcome
2019	Nigel Farage	644,257	2.01	0 / 650	0%	Extra-parliamentary

=== 2024 general election ===
On 22 May 2024, Prime Minister Rishi Sunak announced the date of the general election as 4 July. The next day, Tice launched the Reform UK campaign, promising to field candidates in 630 seats including himself in Boston and Skegness. He said the party wanted to make this the "immigration election". Farage initially ruled out standing, saying it was "not the right time" but promised to "do my bit to help". In the first week of the campaign, Reform's predicted vote in opinion polls rose from 11% to 13%, although many commentators predicted their share would be squeezed and the Conservatives announced policies targeted at Reform voters, such as national service.

On 3 June, Farage became the leader of Reform UK, and pollsters reported an increase in support for the party, in two cases polling within 2% of the Conservative Party. BBC analyst Peter Barnes commented on 9 June that the change in leadership "has clearly had a positive impact on the party's performance in the polls", and that this "has come at the expense of the Conservatives". A poll conducted after the BBC's seven-party debate held on 7 June found Farage to be the winner with 25% support, his closest rival being Labour Party deputy leader Angela Rayner, on 19%. The debate majored on the Normandy landings, war veterans, immigration and the National Health Service (NHS).

Farage said that his aim was to make Reform the Official Opposition party in Parliament. Reform would be standing in 609 out of 650 constituencies. As part of an electoral pact with the Social Democratic Party, the two parties stood aside from each other in six constituencies and a dozen candidates stood under a joint Reform-SDP banner.

On 10 June, the Reform UK candidate for Bexhill and Battle, Ian Gribbin, was reported as having said in 2022 that: "Britain would be in a far better state today had we taken Hitler up on his offer of neutrality." Gribbin apologised without reservation for the comment and upset caused. A party spokesman defended Gribbin by saying that "his historical perspective of what the UK could have done in the 30s was shared by the vast majority of the British establishment including the BBC of its day, and is probably true" that the comments made by Gribbin were not endorsements of the stances and that the party would continue to support him. The Times reported on 13 June that 41 of Reform candidates were Facebook friends with the British neo-fascist leader Gary Raikes. After revelations about the candidates, Farage said on 18 June that the party had hired a vetting company, but had been "stitched up" by them. The company, vetting.com, responded that there had been insufficient time to complete their work, the election having been called earlier than expected.

In the campaign, the party used the slogan "Britain Needs Reform". Its party election video, broadcast nationally on 13 June, showed silently and continuously for 4 minutes and 40 seconds the six words "Britain is Broken. Britain Needs Reform". On 13 June, YouGov polling put Reform at 19% and the Conservatives 18%. Farage declared "We are now the opposition to Labour." On 15 June, the BBC's Laura Kuenssberg said that "the most optimistic Reform politicians can't name more than five or six seats where they reckon they could win." Pollsters Survation published the results of a survey of 42,269 voters employing multilevel regression with poststratification (MRP) which predicted that Reform would win seven seats and YouGov's MRP survey predicted five seats.

On 20 June, the BBC reported that while Farage has been criticised by some Muslim organisations for saying that a growing number of young Muslims do not subscribe to British values, Muslim entrepreneur Zia Yusuf had just given the party a donation amounting to hundreds of thousands of pounds and said that the country has lost control of its borders. He said that it was his "patriotic duty" to fund Farage and Reform UK.

Farage was criticised during the campaign for suggesting that the West had provoked Russia's invasion of Ukraine by expanding the EU and NATO military alliance eastwards. Farage also said that "of course" the war was the fault of Putin.

On 27 June, Channel 4 News revealed homophobic, racist and Islamophobic comments made by party campaigners in Clacton, including an individual calling Sunak a "Paki" (a racist slur against those of South Asian heritage), and suggesting the army should shoot at boats bringing illegal migrants to the UK, and another campaigner calling the LGBT flag "degenerate". Sunak responded that hearing the slur against him "hurts and it makes me angry". Farage described the anti-gay comments as "vulgar, drunk and wrong" and condemned the racist comments, before suggesting the programme was a "set up" by Channel 4, as the individual who made the racist slur against Sunak, Andrew Parker, was an actor and that it alluded to foul play. The party said it made a complaint against Channel 4 for "electoral interference", although reports on 28 June suggested the Electoral Commission had not received such a complaint. Channel 4 commented: "We met Mr Parker for the first time at Reform UK party headquarters, where he was a Reform party canvasser. We did not pay the Reform UK canvasser or anyone else in this report. Mr Parker was not known to Channel 4 News and was filmed covertly via the undercover operation." Following the report, Reform UK dropped its support for three candidates because of past racist comments, and on 30 June, one candidate defected to the Conservatives over a perceived lack of leadership from Reform on the issue.

Less than 20% of Reform candidates were women and the five elected were all men and had a median age of 60.

==== Results ====
The party won five seats (Ashfield, Clacton, Boston and Skegness, Great Yarmouth, and South Basildon and East Thurrock) and came second in 98. Reform's presence split the right-wing vote, allowing Labour to win seats on small margins including South West Norfolk, Poole, South Dorset and Rother Valley. The party won 14% of the vote in total. It became the third-largest party by popular vote, gaining 4,117,610 votes.

Almost 80% of people who voted for Reform had voted for the Conservatives in the previous 2019 election, so 25% of the people who voted for the Conservatives in 2019 switched their vote to Reform in 2024.

Election	Leader	Votes		Seats		Outcome
Election	Leader	No.	Share	Seats won	±	Outcome
2024	Nigel Farage	4,117,610	14.3%	5 / 650	▲5	Opposition

=== Local government ===
The party first stood at local government level in two by-elections in Gloucester on 25 July 2019. They did not win either.

A councillor elected to Rochdale defected to the party in July 2019 from Labour, making for the first councillor; shortly after a Liberal Democrat councillor there also defected. All 12 of Rotherham's then UKIP councillors defected to the Brexit Party in July 2019, as did all 5 of Derby's UKIP councillors. On 13 September 2019, ten independent councillors on Hartlepool Borough Council defected to the Brexit Party. They then formed a pact with the three Conservatives to hold 13 of the 33 seats. In September 2019, a Conservative councillor for Surrey (county) and Elmbridge (borough) defected to the party, after his party decided he would not be reselected.

The 13 councillors of the Hartlepool council group left the party in 2020. The Rotherham group left to form the Rotherham Democratic Party. The party won two seats in the 2021 local elections, both in Derby, one a hold from a previous defection and the other a gain. These were the first council seats won at election by the party, as all their previous ones had been via defections. This left them with eight councillors in total; six in Derby and two more from defections, one in Redbridge from the Conservatives, and one in Swale from UKIP, both in April 2021. Councillors in the Derby City group are members of an affiliate party named "Reform Derby", in alignment with Reform UK.

In December 2021, days before the North Shropshire by-election, local councillor and Deputy Mayor of Market Drayton Town Council, Mark Whittle, defected to the party from the Conservatives. It was reported that all of Reform UK's candidates in the 2022 local elections "will campaign on the benefits of fracking and restarting exploration in the North Sea". Three of the eight council seats held by the party were up for re-election in 2022, all of which had arisen from defections. Both Derby seats were held, but a seat in Redbridge was lost. No new seats were gained.

In December 2022, two former Conservative councillors – one in Barnsley and the other in West Oxfordshire – defected to the party. Another Conservative councillor, Barry Gwilt, of the Fazeley ward of Lichfield District Council, defected to Reform UK in January 2023. In the 2023 local elections, Reform UK won six seats out of the 8,519 up for election and averaged 6% of the vote in the wards where it stood. The six seats won were all in the City of Derby, whose new council proceeded to elect Reform Derby leader Alan Graves to the position of Mayor for 2023/24.

In March 2024, East Riding of Yorkshire councillor Maria Bowtell defected from the Conservatives and joined the party. In the 2024 local elections, Reform UK took approximately 11% of the vote where it stood candidates, and won two seats on Havant Borough Council and one on the London Assembly. Richard Tice said that his party was becoming the real opposition to Labour. On 18 June, four Conservatives from the Tendring District Council defected to Reform, with Jeff Bray becoming leader of the council group.

Since the 2024 general election, Reform UK has won a number of council by-elections. Thirty-two councils now have at least one Reform UK councillor, with the party winning by-elections in Blackpool, Dartford, East Riding of Yorkshire, Kent, St Helens, Swale, Wolverhampton, and Wyre. On 10 January 2025, ten Reform councillors resigned from the party, saying that the party is being run in an "increasingly autocratic manner" since Farage's return as the party's leader. On 14 February 2025, Stuart Keyte became the first elected councillor for Reform UK in Wales, joining three other Reform councillors at Torfaen Council, who had defected to the party after previously sitting as independents.

In March 2025, Reform UK gained defecting councillors in Scotland. John Gray from Renfrewshire Council and Ross Lambie from South Lanarkshire Council both defected from the Conservative Party. On 11 March 2025, Falkirk councillor Claire Mackie-Brown also joined Reform UK from the Conservative Party. Farage welcomed 29 defecting councillors at a press conference in Westminster. Of Reform UK's 113 council seats, 98 have come about via defections from politicians that were elected for another party – the majority, 66 from the Conservative Party – while 15 have been won through elections. Amid this the Councillor Maria Bowtell left the party.

At the 2025 local elections, Reform stood 1,706 candidates representing 97.5% of all wards up for election. It went on to win 677 seats and a majority of seats on 10 councils. The party also won 2 of the 6 mayoral elections taking place, Greater Lincolnshire and Hull and East Yorkshire. A projected national vote share collated by the BBC put Reform on 30% of the vote slightly ahead of its position in opinion polls conducted immediately prior to the local elections. After four of Reform's new councillors stepped down, the party were unable to retain three of those seats in the subsequent by-elections, losing two to the Conservatives and the other to the Liberal Democrats.

Data has shown that most of Reform UK's representation comes from those who have defected from the Conservative Party.

At the 2026 local elections, Reform stood 4,821 candidates representing 95% of all wards up for election. It went on to win 1,453 seats and a majority of seats on 14 councils.

=== Senedd elections ===
Year	Regional vote			Constituency vote			Overall seats	Change
2021	11,730 votes	1.1%	0 / 20	17,405 votes	1.6%	0 / 40	0 / 60	New party
2026	Regional seats abolished			367,985 votes	29.3%	34 / 96	34 / 96	▲34

=== Scottish Parliament elections ===
Year	Regional vote			Constituency vote			Overall seats	Change
2021	5,793 votes	0.2%	0 / 56	–	–	0 / 73	0 / 129	New party
2026	383,425 votes	16.6%	17 / 56	361,994 votes	15.8%	0 / 73	17 / 129	▲17

=== London Assembly elections ===
Year	Regional vote			Constituency vote			Overall seats	±
2021	25,009 votes	1.0%	0 / 11	62,263 votes	2.4%	0 / 14	0 / 25	New party
2024	145,409 votes	5.9%	1 / 11	188,420 votes	7.4%	0 / 14	1 / 25	▲1

== See also ==
- Brexit Party election results
- Euroscepticism in the United Kingdom – British opposition to the European Union
- Opinion polling for 2019 European Parliament election in the UK
- Opinion polling for the 2019 United Kingdom general election
- Opinion polling for the 2024 United Kingdom general election
- Reform Australia, an unaffiliated political movement founded in December 2025
- Reform Party of Canada – Federal political party (1987–2000)
