= CCNet =

CCNet may refer to:

- CCNET, a 1980s academic computing network
- ccnet.com, an Internet service provider formerly located in Contra Costa County, California
- the .NET version of the CruiseControl continuous integration software package
- Cambridge Conference Network, formerly a discussion group concerning climate change skepticism and other topics
- A Minecraft server known for its gameplay based on a Minecraft recreation of the map of the Earth.
