= The Global Warming Policy Foundation =

UK climate change denial lobby group

- Founded: 23 November 2009
- Type: Charitable organisation
- VAT ID no.: 06962749
- Registration no.: 1131448
- Location(s): 55 Tufton Street; London SW1P 3QL, England, United Kingdom
- Coordinates: 51°30′23″N 00°07′55″W
- Key people: Terence Mordaunt, Chairman; Lord Mackinlay, Director
- Revenue: £275,359 (FY 2024)
- Expenses: £425,545 (FY 2024)
- Endowment: £325,842 (FY 2011)
- Employees: 3
- Website: www.thegwpf.org

The Global Warming Policy Foundation (GWPF) is a climate change denial lobby group registered as a charitable organisation in the United Kingdom. Its stated aims are to challenge what it calls "extremely damaging and harmful policies" envisaged by governments to mitigate anthropogenic global warming. The GWPF, and some of its prominent members individually, practise and promote climate change denial.

In 2014, when the Charity Commission ruled that the GWPF had breached rules on impartiality, a non-charitable organisation called the Global Warming Policy Forum was created to do lobbying that a charity could not. In October 2021 the Global Warming Policy Forum was rebranded as Net Zero Watch. Its website carries an array of articles sceptical of the scientific consensus of anthropogenic global warming and its impacts.

== History ==
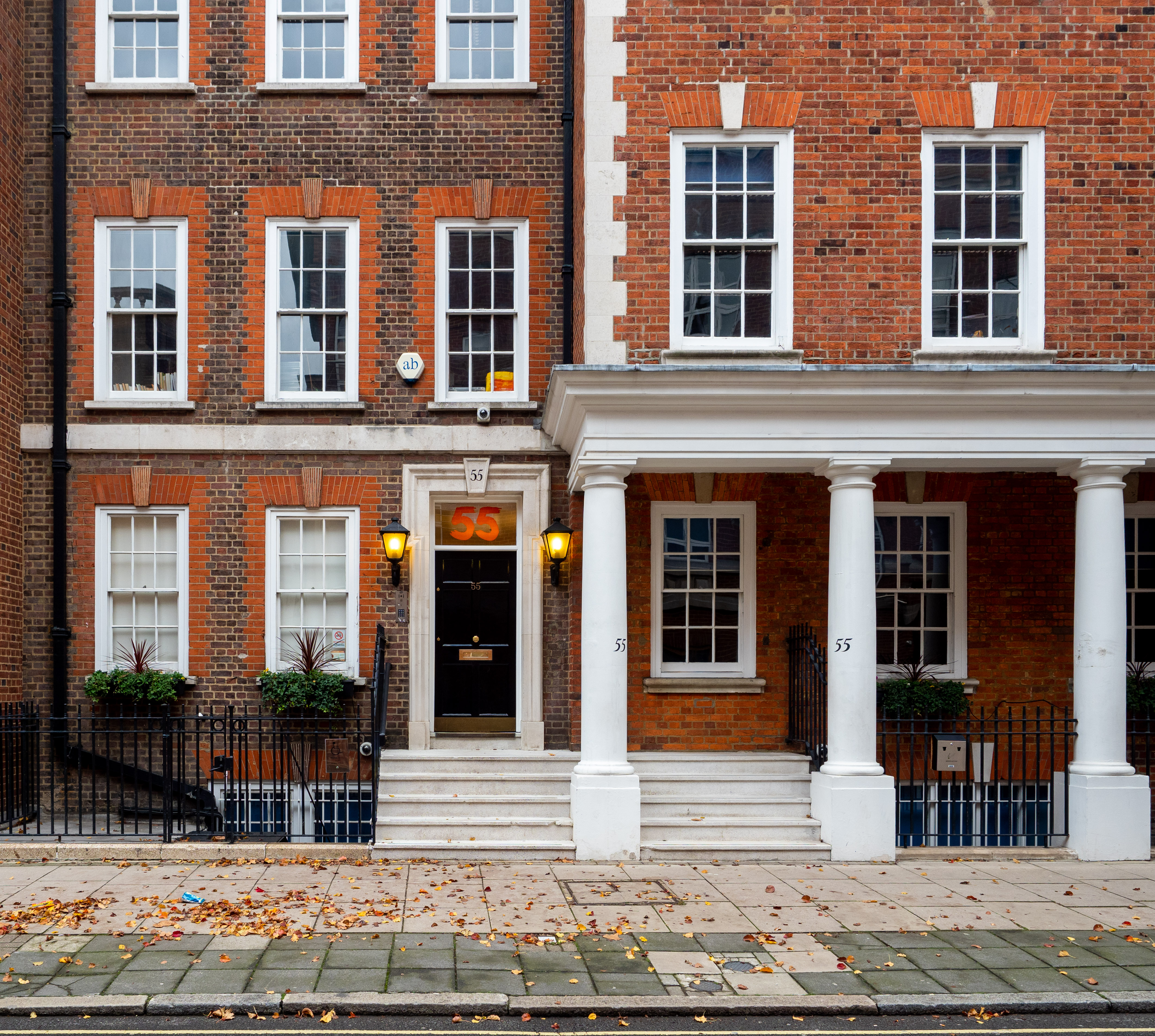
55 Tufton Street, location of The Global Warming Policy Foundation

The foundation was established in November 2009, a week after the start of the Climatic Research Unit email controversy, with its headquarters in a room of the Institute of Materials, Minerals and Mining at 1 Carlton House Terrace, London, and subsequently moved to 55 Tufton Street, London SW1P 3QL. Its director is Benny Peiser, an expert on the social and economic aspects of physical exercise, and it is chaired by Terence Mordaunt, co-owner of the cargo handling business Bristol Port Company. It was previously chaired by the former Chancellor of the Exchequer, Nigel Lawson. GWPF states that it is "deeply concerned about the costs and other implications of many of the policies currently being advocated" to address climate change and that it aims to "bring reason, integrity and balance to a debate that has become seriously unbalanced, irrationally alarmist, and all too often depressingly intolerant".

=== Funding sources ===
Because it is registered as a charity, the GWPF is not legally required to report its sources of funding, and Peiser has declined to reveal its funding sources, citing privacy concerns. Peiser said GWPF does not receive funding "from people with links to energy companies or from the companies themselves." Hedge fund manager Michael Hintze was an early donor to the foundation. The foundation has rejected freedom of information (FoI) requests to disclose its funding sources on at least four occasions. The judge ruling on the latest FoI request, Alison McKenna, said that the GWPF was not sufficiently influential to merit forcing them to disclose the source of the £50,000 that was originally provided to establish the organisation.

In May 2022, OpenDemocracy reported that tax filings in the US revealed that GWPF had taken money from US 'dark money' sources, including $620,259 from the Donors Trust between 2016 and 2020. The Donors Trust has in turn received significant funding from the Koch brothers. The group also received funding from the Sarah Scaife foundation, set up by the heir to an oil and banking dynasty.

=== Charitable status ===
In June 2013 Bob Ward filed a formal complaint to the Charity Commission, alleging that the GWPF had "persistently disseminated inaccurate and misleading information about climate change as part of its campaign against climate policies in the UK and overseas", and that this was an abuse of their charitable status.

In 2014 the Charity Commission ruled that the GWPF had breached rules on impartiality in its climate change coverage, blurred fact and comment and demonstrated a clear bias. In response, the GWPF agreed to establish a non-charitable organisation to do the lobbying, alongside the existing organisation, to be called the "Global Warming Policy Forum". In October 2021, Global Warming Policy Forum rebranded itself as Net Zero Watch.

In 2021 a student-led open letter signed by 74 scientists was sent to the Charity Commission calling for The Global Warming Policy Foundation to be stripped of its educational charity status. The Commission dismissed the call.

In October 2022 a complaint was made to the Charity Commission by Liberal Democrat, Labour and Green Party MPs that The Global Warming Policy Foundation is a lobbying organisation, and misuses charitable funds by passing them to Net Zero Watch, which uses the funds for non-charitable purposes. In November 2022, the Charity Commission confirmed that it was reviewing the complaint. Three months later, the GWPF reported a "serious incident" to the Charity Commission. In July 2024, the Charity Commission announced that it had concluded its investigation. It said that it was "satisfied the concerns raised are now resolved". The Good Law Project said the decision was "startling".

== Climate change denial ==
The GWPF's first act was to call for a high-level, independent inquiry into the hacked e-mails from the University of East Anglia's Climatic Research Unit. Nigel Lawson suggested that the e-mails from the University of East Anglia "called into question" the integrity of the scientific evidence.

Subsequent investigations did not support this view. GWPF Director Benny Peiser said that the organisation did not doubt the science and was not going to discuss it, but want an open, frank debate about what policies should be adopted. A spokesman for the Met Office, a government agency which works with the Climate Research Unit in providing global temperature information, dismissed this call. "If you look at the emails, there isn't any evidence that the data was falsified and there's no evidence that climate change is a hoax. It's a shame that some of the sceptics have had to take this rather shallow attempt to discredit robust science undertaken by some of the world's most respected scientists. The bottom line is that temperatures continue to rise and humans are responsible for it. We have every confidence in the science and the various datasets we use. The peer-review process is as robust as it could possibly be."

David Aaronovitch noted the GWPF's launch in The Times, writing "Lord Lawson’s acceptance of the science turns out, on close scrutiny, to be considerably less than half-hearted. Thus he speaks of 'the (present) majority scientific view', hinting rather slyly at the near possibility of a future, entirely different scientific view. (...) 'Sceptic' (...) is simply a misnomer. People such as Lord Lawson are not sceptical, for if one major peer-reviewed piece of scientific research were ever to be published casting doubt on climate change theory, you just know they’d have it up in neon at Piccadilly Circus. They are only sceptical about what they don’t want to be true."

The Guardian quoted Bob Ward, the policy and communications director at the Grantham Research Institute on Climate Change and the Environment at the London School of Economics, as saying "some of those names are straight from the Who's Who of current climate change sceptics ... It's just going to be a way of pumping material into the debate that hasn't been through scrutiny". The Guardian article cast doubt on the idea that an upsurge in scepticism was underway, noting that "in (the US) Congress, even the most determined opponents of climate change legislation now frame their arguments in economic terms rather than on the science".

When the GWPF's website was launched in November 2009, a graph used in the logo graphic on each page of the website of '21st Century global mean temperatures' showed a slow decline over the selected period from 2001 to 2008. Hannah Devlin of The Times found an error for 2003 and noted that if the period from 2000 to 2009 had been chosen, then a rise in temperature would have been shown rather than a fall. Bob Ward said that the graph was contrary to the true measurements, and that by leaving out the temperature trend during the 20th century, the graph obscured the fact that 8 of the 10 hottest years on record have occurred this century. The GWPF blamed a "small error by our graphic designer" for the mistake which would now be changed, but said that starting the graph earlier would be equally arbitrary.

Fred Pearce wrote in The Guardian that the three inquiries GWPF looked into were all badly flawed, and that The Climategate Inquiries report ably dissects their failures. He writes that "for all its sharp—and in many cases justified—rejoinders to the official inquiries its report is likely to be ignored in some quarters for its brazen hypocrisy." Pearce argues that one of the criticisms of the three inquiries was that no climate sceptics were on the inquiry teams, and now the critics themselves have produced a review of the reviews that included no one not already supportive of the sceptical position. But, Pearce wrote, Montford "has landed some good blows here."

In 2014 The Independent described the foundation as "the UK's most prominent source of climate-change denial".

In 2011, Chris Huhne, former UK Secretary of State for Energy and Climate Change described GWPF as "misinformed", "wrong", and "perverse".

The Skeptic awarded the foundation its 2022 Rusty Razor award as part of its annual presentation of Ockham Awards, naming the foundation as "the year’s worst promoters of pseudoscience" for its "prolific attempts to weaken and undermine public and political will to tackle climate change".

== Personnel ==
In May 2014, the GWPF listed Benny Peiser, a social anthropologist, as the director, and a board of trustees consisting of Nigel Lawson (chairman), Lord Donoughue, Lord Fellowes, Peter R. Forster (the former Bishop of Chester), Martin Jacomb, Baroness Nicholson, Sir James Spooner and Lord Turnbull.

In 2015, Lord Moore was made a trustee of the organisation.

In November 2022, David, Lord Frost, was listed as a Director of the GWPF on Companies House.

Andrew William Montford has been appointed to run an inquiry into the three British Climategate-inquiries for the Global Warming Policy Foundation. His report The Climategate Inquiries was published in September 2010.

One of the Foundation's trustees, Graham Stringer MP, a Labour party politician, sat on the House of Commons' Science and Technology Committee at various times until May 2024, a Parliamentary select committee which scrutinises government actions in relation to topics including climate change. Another trustee, Steve Baker MP, sat on the House of Commons' Treasury Select Committee for many years.

In February 2023, former Australian Prime Minister Tony Abbott joined the board of the Foundation.

In October 2023, it was reported in Computer Weekly that John Constable of the GWPF was a member of the "Covid Hunters", a group of Brexit lobbyists who conducted a secret two-year-long attack on the prestigious science journal Nature.

In March 2025, Benny Peiser resigned as Director and Lord Mackinlay was appointed to replace him.

== See also ==
- Global warming controversy
- Lobbying in the United Kingdom
- Climate change in the United Kingdom
