= Centre for Climate Change Economics and Policy =

UK Climate Change research institute

The Centre for Climate Change Economics and Policy (CCCEP) is a climate change research centre in England, which studies the economics of global warming. It is hosted jointly by the University of Leeds and the London School of Economics and Political Science (LSE).

CCCEP is part of the Grantham Research Institute on Climate Change and the Environment, which is chaired by Lord Nicholas Stern of Brentford, former Chief Economist of the World Bank and author of the widely known Stern Review.

CCCEP was established in 2008: its mission is to advance public and private action on climate change through rigorous, innovative research. In pursuit of its mission, CCCEP has seven research themes in its phase 3 programme:

1. Climate information for adaptation
2. Competitiveness in the low-carbon economy
3. Incentives for behaviour change
4. Integrating climate and development policies for ‘climate compatible development’
5. Low-carbon industrial strategies in challenging contexts
6. Low-carbon, climate-resilient cities
7. Sustainable infrastructure finance

According to a report published by the centre in 2018 on the economics of climate change mitigation the economic impacts of climate change will be much larger if cuts in greenhouse gas emissions are delayed.

CCCEP is co-host of the Place-based Climate Action Network (P-CAN), which is funded by the ESRC.
