= All the Good Pilgrims =

Travel book

All the Good Pilgrims is a travel book by Canadian travel writer Robert Ward, published in May 2007 by Thomas Allen Publishers. It relates the author's adventures and encounters on his several journeys along Spain's Camino de Santiago pilgrimage road.
