= John Bolton (York MP) =

English mercer

John Bolton (died c.1426) was an English mercer and Member of Parliament (MP).

He was a Member of the Parliament of England for City of York in 1399 and 1407. He was Mayor of York 3 Feb. 1410–11.

Parliament of England
Preceded by unknown unknown	Member of Parliament for City of York; 1399; With: William Frost	Succeeded by unknown unknown

Parliament of England
Preceded by unknown unknown	Member of Parliament for City of York; 1407; With: Robert Talkan	Succeeded by unknown unknown
