= Robert Talkan =

- Citizenship: United Kingdom
- Occupation: Politician

Robert Talkan (fl. 1399–1407), of York, was an English Member of Parliament.

He was a member (MP) of the Parliament of England for City of York in 1402 and 1407. He was mayor of York in 1399–1400.

Parliament of England
Preceded by unknown unknown	Member of Parliament for City of York; 1402; With: Robert Ward	Succeeded by unknown unknown

Parliament of England
Preceded by unknown unknown	Member of Parliament for City of York; 1407; With: John Bolton	Succeeded by unknown unknown
