= Robert Ward (travel writer) =

Canadian travel writer

- Occupation: Travel writer

Robert Ward is a Canadian author and travel writer with a special interest in pilgrimages. Though a self-professed atheist, he specialized in religious studies and English literature at the University of Toronto before doing an M.A. in English at the University of Western Ontario.

== Career ==
Ward's first book, Virgin Trails (2002), is a memoir of Ward's visits to various pilgrimage sites of Western Europe dedicated to the Virgin Mary (including Lourdes, Chartres, Fatima, Rome and Loreto, as well as the Camino de Santiago). It is a mix of history, legend and tales of encounters with contemporary Catholic pilgrims.

Ward's second book, All the Good Pilgrims (2007), deals with his several walking journeys along Spain's Camino de Santiago. Highly anecdotal, it retells the author's adventures as a sceptical modern pilgrim on a venerable Catholic road of faith.

== Personal life ==
Ward lives in Toronto, Canada.

== Bibliography ==
- Virgin Trails (2002)
- All the Good Pilgrims (2007)
