= Robert Ward (Missouri politician) =

American politician

Member of the U.S. House of Representatives from Missouri's 151st district

Missouri House of Representatives
- In office 1983–1995

Personal details
- Born: 1940 Bonne Terre, Missouri
- Died: 2017 (aged 76–77) Bonne Terre, Missouri
- Party: Democratic
- Spouse: Joy Vincent
- Children: 2
- Occupation: businessman

Robert Ward (July 3, 1940 - January 23, 2017) was a Democratic politician from Desloge, Missouri, who served in the Missouri House of Representatives. He was born in Bonne Terre, Missouri, and was educated at Desloge public schools, Murray State University, and Southwest Missouri State University. On December 29, 1962, he married Joy Vincent.
