= Robert Ward (MP for City of York) =

English merchant and MP

Robert Ward (died 1405), of York, was an English merchant, trading in wool and cloth, and a Member of Parliament (MP).

He was a Member of the Parliament of England for City of York in 1402.

Parliament of England
| Preceded by unknown unknown | Member of Parliament for City of York; 1402; With: Robert Talkan | Succeeded by unknown unknown |
