= Terence Mordaunt =

British entrepreneur; owner of Bristol Port (born 1947)

- Born: Terence Charles Mordaunt; 22 May 1947 (age 79); Surrey, England
- Education: Wells Cathedral School
- Occupation: Entrepreneur
- Years active: 1991–present
- Known for: Owner of The Bristol Port Company
- Spouses: Linda Jeanne Forstmann (m. 1973–2000); Julia Isabella Francesca Grassick (m. 2015)
- Children: Sharon Christie Mordaunt Jonathan Charles Mordaunt
- Website: www.bristolport.co.uk

Terence Charles Mordaunt (born 22 May 1947) is a British entrepreneur, chairman and co-owner of The Bristol Port Company.

He is also chairman of Pendennis Shipyard, founder of The Mordaunt Foundation, chairman of the Global Warming Policy Foundation, and trustee of The Outward Bound Trust.

== Early life and education ==
Terence Mordaunt was educated at Wells Cathedral School in Somerset, England, which he attended between 1958 and 1965.

He received an honorary doctorate from the University of Bristol in 2000.

== Career ==
=== Early career ===
Mordaunt started his career as a navigating apprentice in the Merchant Navy. He obtained his master's ticket in 1974.

He was later a Distribution Manager for Alcan UK, before becoming Commercial Director at housebuilder Bellway plc in 1983, where he was responsible for large land acquisitions.

In 1986, Mordaunt founded management consultancy First Corporate Consultants.

=== The Bristol Port Company ===
Mordaunt is co-owner and chairman of the cargo handling business The Bristol Port Company, where he has a controlling interest. He and his business partner Sir David Ord founded the company when they purchased the 150-year lease in Avonmouth and Royal Portbury Docks from Bristol City Council for £36 million in 1991.

In 2015, Bristol City Council sold the freehold of the port to the company for £10 million, but retained a 12.5% non-voting stake in the company.

=== Other activity ===
Mordaunt is chairman of Pendennis Shipyard, a Falmouth-based company that builds and refits luxury yachts, which had a turnover of £52m in 2017.

In 2019, Terence Mordaunt officially handed over a collection of letters written by Isambard Kingdom Brunel to the SS Great Britain Trust when they were discovered at Bristol Port.

In 2016, Mordaunt founded The Mordaunt Foundation, which provides grants to a number of regional, national and international organisations.

Terence Mordaunt is a Trustee of the Outward Bound Trust.

Since 1995, Mordaunt has been a member of The Society of Merchant Venturers.

== Political activity ==
Terence Mordaunt is a patron of Conservative Way Forward, a British Thatcherite think tank.

In April 2017, Mordaunt joined the board of the Global Warming Policy Foundation, a think tank which promotes climate change denial, succeeding Nigel Lawson as chairman in 2019. Mordaunt told OpenDemocracy in 2019: "No one has proved yet that carbon dioxide is the culprit [of climate change]. It may not be. If you ask me should we just put carbon dioxide in the air, I would say 'no'. And that is the stance of the Global Warming Policy Foundation."

In 2019, The Bristol Port Company gave Boris Johnson and Jeremy Hunt £25,000 each for their campaigns to become the Conservative Party leader. Terence Mordaunt and Sir David Ord have given over £640,000 to the Conservative Party since 2001. Mordaunt was listed as the 13th biggest donor to the pro-Brexit campaign.

In 2022, Penny Mordaunt's prime ministerial campaign stated that Terence Mordaunt is not a relative.

Since 22nd June 2023, Terence's company First Corporate Consultants Limited has given £100,000 to the Reform UK party.
