= Benny Peiser =

British social anthropologist

- בני פייזר
- Born: 1957 (age 68–69); Haifa, Israel
- Education: PhD Cultural Studies
- Alma mater: Frankfurt University
- Occupations: Social anthropologist, writer
- Organisation(s): Director, Global Warming Policy Foundation; Founder & editor, Cambridge Conference Network; Co-editor, Energy & Environment

Benny Josef Peiser (Hebrew: בני יוסף פייזר; born 1957) is a social anthropologist specialising in the environmental and socio-economic impact of physical activity on health. He was a senior lecturer in the School of Sport and Exercise Sciences at Liverpool John Moores University (LJMU) and is a visiting fellow at the University of Buckingham.

Peiser established the Cambridge Conference Network in 1997. He serves as co-editor of the journal, Energy & Environment and is a regular contributor to Canada's National Post. (Note: The National Post, former media magnate Conrad Black's national flagship title was established to provide a voice for Canadian conservatives and to compete with Canada's The Globe and Mail, the establishment newspaper with a liberal bias in Canadian newspapers. Outside Toronto, the National Post was built on the printing and distribution infrastructure of Black's national newspaper chain, formerly called Southam Newspapers, that included papers such as the Ottawa Citizen, Montreal Gazette, Edmonton Journal, Calgary Herald, and Vancouver Sun and Benny Peiser continues to participate in stories with these newspapers as well.) He became the director UK lobbying group Global Warming Policy Foundation in 2009. His interest as a social anthropologist, is in "how climate change is portrayed as a potential disaster and how we respond to that".

== Background ==
Born of German parents in Haifa, Israel, in 1957, Peiser's family soon returned to Germany. He grew up in Frankfurt and "spent the first 35 years of his life" in Germany.

Peiser studied political science, English, and sports science at Frankfurt University, receiving a doctorate in cultural studies (Kulturwissenschaften) from that institution in 1993, for an examination of the history, archaeology and natural history of Greek problems at the time of the ancient Olympic Games.

Drawn by "concerns about nuclear energy and its waste", he reportedly was involved with the German Green Party while a student.

Upon completing his doctoral degree, Peiser moved to Liverpool, England, to take up a position as lecturer at Liverpool John Moores University.

== Career and research interests ==
Peiser was previously employed as an historian of ancient sport at the University of Frankfurt. He listed his research interests at LJMU as the effects of environmental change and catastrophic events on contemporary thought and societal evolution; climate change and science communication; international climate policy; the risks posed by near-Earth objects and satellites and the environmental and socio-economic impacts of physical activity. Peiser is a member of Spaceguard UK. A 10 km-wide asteroid, Minor Planet (7107) Peiser, is named in his honour by the International Astronomical Union.

== Cambridge Conference Network ==
In 1997 Peiser established the Cambridge Conference Network, an email-based discussion group for a conference of the Society for Interdisciplinary Studies about Bronze Age catastrophes. Over time the network began to focus on discussion on climate change and was renamed CCNet (active from 1997 to 2006), to provide a platform for "the minority of people who are climate (change) sceptics or have doubts about the prevailing views".

On 11–13 July 1997, Benny Peiser and co-editors in the Second Society for Interdisciplinary Studies Cambridge Conference held at Fitzwilliam College, examined astronomical and meteoritic background of catastrophic thinking, for example near-Earth objects, cometary catastrophes and ecological disasters. Proceedings were compiled in a publication entitled Natural Catastrophes during Bronze Age Civilisations.

== Climate change denial ==
Peiser has denied the reality of anthropogenic climate change in a number of editorials and speaking engagements. Benny Peiser is director of global warming denialist think-tank The Global Warming Policy Foundation.

== Selected publications ==
- Peiser, Benny Josef (1993). Das dunkle Zeitalter Olympias: Kritische Untersuchung der historischen, archaeologischen und naturgeschichtlichen Probleme der griechischen Achsenzeit am Beispiel der antiken Olympischen Spiele. Frankfurt am Main: P. Lang. ISBN 978-3-631-46522-6. ("The dark age of Olympia, critical investigation of the historical, archeological and natural science problems of the Axial age of Greece with reference to the Ancient Olympic Games")
- Palmer, Trevor; Peiser, Benny Josef (1998). Natural catastrophes during Bronze Age civilisations: archaeological, geological, astronomical and cultural perspectives. Oxford, England: Archaeopress. ISBN 978-0-86054-916-1.
- B. Peiser (2003) Climate Change and Civilisation Collapse, in Okonski, Kendra (2003). Adapt or die: the science, politics and economics of climate change. London: Profile. ISBN 978-1-86197-795-3.
- M. Paine and B. Peiser (2004) The frequency and consequences of cosmic impacts since the demise of the dinosaurs, in: Bioastronomy 2002: Life among the Stars, eds. R. Norris & F. Stootman, (Sydney), 214–226
- B. Peiser and T. Reilly (2004) Environmental factors in the summer Olympics in historical perspective. Journal of Sports Science 22(10) 981–1002
- B. Peiser (2005) From Genocide to Ecocide: The Rape of Rapa Nui. Energy & Environment 16:3&4, pp. 513–539
- B. Peiser (2005) Cultural aspects of neo-catastrophism: Implications for archaeoastronomy. In: Current Studies in Archaeoastronomy (J Fountain and R Sinclair, eds). The Carolina Academic Press Press, Durham, North Carolina, pp. 25–37
- T. Reilly and B. Peiser (2006) Seasonal variations in health-related human physical activity, Sports Medicine 36:6, 473–485
- A. Ball, S. Kelley and B. Peiser (2006) Near Earth Objects and the Impact Hazard. (Milton Keynes: Open University)
- B. Peiser, T Reilly, G Atkinson, B Drust, J Waterhouse (2006). Seasonal changes and physiological responses: Their impact on activity, health, exercise and athletic performance. (The extreme environment and sports medicine) International SportMed Journal 7(1), 16–32.
- Brook, Barry W., et al. (2007) Would the Australian megafauna have become extinct if humans had never colonised the continent? Quaternary Science Reviews, Volume 26, Issues 1–2, January 2007.
