= Grantham Research Institute on Climate Change and the Environment (London School of Economics) =

English research institute

Coordinates: 51.515750°N 0.11504500°W

The Grantham Research Institute on Climate Change and the Environment is a research institute founded in May 2008 at the London School of Economics and Political Science.

== Description ==
The centre is a partner of the Grantham Institute for Climate Change at Imperial College and acts as an umbrella body for LSE's overall research contributions to the field of climate change and its impact on the environment. Furthermore, the institute oversees the activities of the Centre for Climate Change Economics and Policy (CCCEP), a partnership between LSE and the University of Leeds. Both Grantham research centres are sponsored through the Grantham Foundation for the Protection of the Environment, established by Hannelore and Jeremy Grantham in 1997. The combined investments totalling approximately £24 million is recognised as one of the largest private contributions to climate change research. CCCEP is funded independently by the Economic and Social Research Council (ESRC).

The research of the institute is characterised by its interdisciplinary nature and brings together international expertise on economics, finance, geography, the environment, international development and political economy, as the centre's academic staff comprise a broad range of disciplines, including physicists, climatologists, economists, statisticians, political scientists and various other social scientists.

The institute has been chaired by Lord Nicholas Stern of Brentford, former Chief Economist of the World Bank and author of the widely known Stern Review. Bob Ward is the policy and communications director. Elizabeth Robinson is director of the Grantham Research Institute.

== Activities and accomplishments ==
In September 2015, the institute hosted an Open Energy Modelling Initiative workshop. In October 2021, the institute published a working paper by Nicholas Stern stating that economists had grossly undervalued young lives. In April 2026, the institute published an analysis suggesting that climate change has reduced the low-income and lower-middle-income countries GDP between 4% and 12%.

The institute has compiled a database on climate laws, policies and litigation, available at Climate-Laws.org.
