= Bob Ward (communications director) =

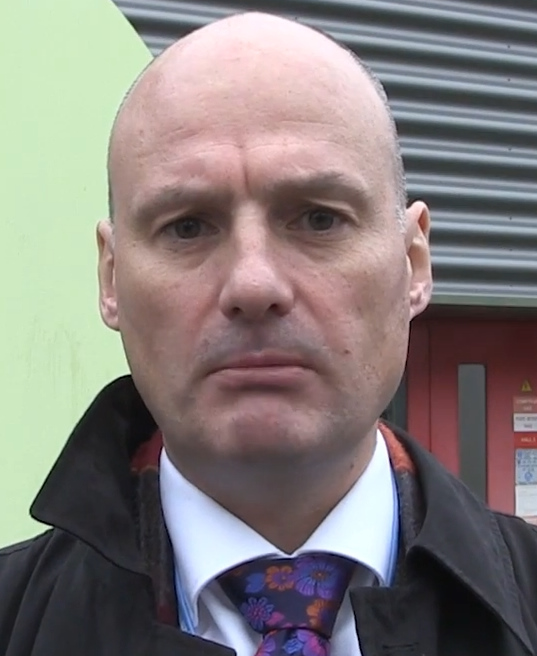
- 2015 United Nations Climate Change Conference
- Occupations: policy and communications director
- Employer: Grantham Research Institute on Climate Change and the Environment at the London School of Economics

Bob Ward has served as policy and communications director of the Grantham Research Institute on Climate Change and the Environment at the London School of Economics since 2008.

He worked at the Royal Society, where he headed the media team, for eight years until 2006. He has an undergraduate degree in geology. He once worked at HECSU.

== Views on climate change ==
Ward's first significant involvement with climate change issues was in August 2005 when, as Royal Society communications director, he called on ExxonMobil to stop misrepresenting the state of the science. Ward's communications with the company included the statement he found it "very difficult to reconcile the misrepresentations of climate change science ... with ExxonMobil's claims to be an industry leader". Ward learned from the company's charitable giving statements that it had continued to provide significant funds to 39 organizations involved in "... denial ... overstating the amount and significance of uncertainty ... or by conveying a misleading impression of the potential impacts of anthropogenic climate change."

In 2009 he commented on the Climatic Research Unit email controversy, saying that "The politicians won't be swayed by this. It's basic physics that the world is being warmed by greenhouse gases, and politicians can see through the sceptics' arguments." He supported calls for an independent investigation into the controversy but believed the emails did not reveal evidence of wrongdoing. He also commented on how climate change denial had, in his opinion, been adopted as a political cause by the far right.

In 2010 he expressed concern over reports that some Fellows of the Royal Society disagreed with the Society's official policy on "Preventing dangerous climate change" as stated in December 2009. In a letter to The Times and in an Op-Ed in The Guardian he urged the Royal Society to clarify its stance on global warming.

In 2019, on the occasion of US President Trump's visit to the UK, Ward coordinated a letter to Prime Minister Theresa May. The letter, which was signed by 250 scientists, urged her to challenge President Trump on his "refusal to accept and address global climate change". Signatories included Chris Rapley, Hugh Montgomery and Joanna Haigh.
