= Van Hulten =

Van Hulten is a Dutch surname. Notable people with the surname include:

- Michel van Hulten (1930–2025), Dutch politician
- Michiel van Hulten (born 1969), Dutch politician, son of Michel

== See also ==
- Hultén, a Swedish surname
