= The Purple Revolution =

The Purple Revolution may refer to:

- The Purple Revolution: The Year That Changed Everything, 2015 book by Nigel Farage
- January 2005 Iraqi parliamentary election, referred to as "Purple Revolution" by President of the United States George W. Bush
