= Nigel Farage =

British politician and broadcaster (born 1964)

Nigel Farage MP
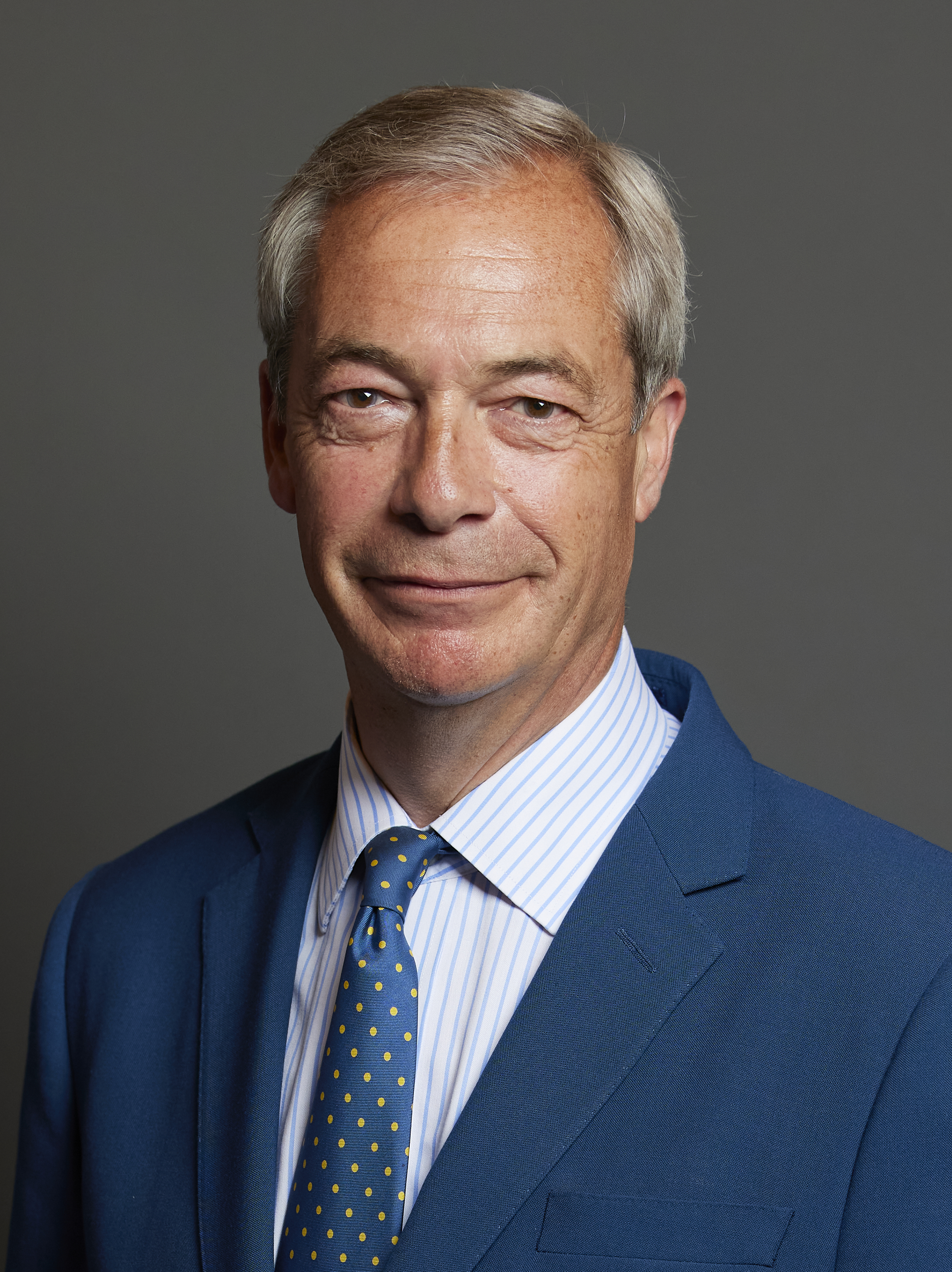
- Official portrait, 2024

Leader of Reform UK
- Incumbent
- Assumed office 3 June 2024
- Deputy: David Bull; Ben Habib; Richard Tice
- Chairman: Richard Tice; Zia Yusuf; David Bull; Lee Anderson
- Preceded by: Richard Tice
- In office 22 March 2019 – 6 March 2021 (Note: Named the "Brexit Party" until 4 January 2021)
- Chairman: Richard Tice
- Preceded by: Catherine Blaiklock
- Succeeded by: Richard Tice
Previous party positions
Honorary President of Reform UK
In role 6 March 2021 – 3 June 2024
Leader	Richard Tice
Preceded by	Role established
Succeeded by	Role abolished
Leader of the UK Independence Party
Acting; 5 October 2016 – 28 November 2016
Chairman	Paul Oakden
Preceded by	Diane James
Succeeded by	Paul Nuttall
In office 5 November 2010 – 16 September 2016
Deputy	David Campbell Bannerman; Christopher Monckton; Paul Nuttall
Chairman	Steve Crowther
Preceded by	Jeffrey Titford (Acting)
Succeeded by	Diane James
In office 27 September 2006 – 27 November 2009
Deputy	David Campbell Bannerman
Chairman	John Whittaker; Paul Nuttall
Preceded by	Roger Knapman
Succeeded by	The Lord Pearson of Rannoch
President of Europe of Freedom and Direct Democracy (Note: Known as Independence/Democracy from 2004 to 2009 and Europe of Freedom and Democracy from 2009 to 2014)
In office 20 July 2004 – 1 July 2019
Served with	Hanne Dahl; Francesco Speroni; David Borrelli
Preceded by	Jens-Peter Bonde
Succeeded by	Office abolished
Chairman of the UK Independence Party
In office 1998 – 22 January 2000
Leader	Michael Holmes
Preceded by	Alan Sked
Succeeded by	Mike Nattrass

Member of Parliament for Clacton
- Incumbent
- Assumed office 4 July 2024 (Note: Resigned on 8 July 2026, but was re-elected in the following by-election and returned to Parliament on 13 August.)
- Preceded by: Giles Watling
- Majority: 12,784 (36.4%)

Member of the European Parliament for South East England
- In office 10 June 1999 – 31 January 2020
- Preceded by: Constituency established
- Succeeded by: Constituency abolished

Personal details
- Born: Nigel Paul Farage; 3 April 1964 (age 62) Farnborough, Kent, England
- Party: Reform UK (since 2019)
- Other political affiliations: Conservative (1978–1992); Anti-Federalist League (1992–1993); UKIP (1993–2018); Independent (2018–2019)
- Spouses: Gráinne Hayes (m. 1988; div. 1997); Kirsten Mehr (m. 1999, separated)
- Domestic partner: Laure Ferrari
- Children: 4
- Education: Dulwich College
- Occupation: Politician; broadcaster; media personality
- Website: nfarage.com
- Nigel Farage's voice Farage speaks in a European Parliament debate on the election of Ursula von der Leyen as President of the European Commission. Recorded 16 July 2019

Nigel Paul Farage (Note: /ˈfærɑːʒ/ FARR-ahzh. However, he pronounced it /ˈfærɪdʒ/ FARR-ij in his youth.) (born 3 April 1964) is a British politician who has been Leader of Reform UK and Member of Parliament for Clacton since 2024. (Note: Farage previously served as the leader of Reform UK from 2019 to 2021, which was known as the Brexit Party from 2018 to 2021.) He was the leader of the UK Independence Party (UKIP) from 2006 to 2009 and from 2010 to 2016, and a member of the European Parliament (MEP) for South East England from 1999 until the United Kingdom's withdrawal from the European Union (EU) in 2020.

Farage was a member of the Conservative Party for 14 years, from 1978 to 1992. He has been a prominent Eurosceptic since the early 1990s and was first elected to the European Parliament in 1999. In 2004, he became the president of Europe of Freedom and Direct Democracy. Farage was elected UKIP's leader in 2006 and led the party at the 2009 European Parliament election, when it won the second-most votes in the UK. He stood unsuccessfully in Buckingham at the 2010 general election before returning as UKIP's leader later that year. At the 2014 European Parliament election, UKIP won the most seats in the UK, pressuring David Cameron to call the 2016 EU membership referendum. At the 2015 general election, Farage was an unsuccessful candidate in South Thanet.

After the referendum, Farage resigned as UKIP's leader. In 2018, he co-founded the Brexit Party (renamed Reform UK in 2021), which drew support from those frustrated by the delayed implementation of Brexit by the Conservative government, and won the most votes at the 2019 European Parliament election, becoming the largest single party in the parliament. At the 2024 general election Farage again became Reform UK's leader, and won in Clacton. In July 2026, whilst under investigation by the Parliamentary Commissioner for Standards over undeclared gifts including one of £5 million, Farage announced his resignation as MP for Clacton, triggering a by-election which he won with 63.3% of the vote.

== Early life and education ==
Nigel Paul Farage was born on 3 April 1964 in Farnborough, Kent, England, the son of Barbara née Stevens and Guy Justus Oscar Farage. His father was a stockbroker who worked in the City of London. A 2012 BBC Radio 4 profile described Guy as an alcoholic who left the family home when Nigel was five years old. Guy gave up alcohol two years later, in 1971, and entered the antiques trade, having lost his Stock Exchange position; the next year, endorsed by friends, he returned to the trading floor at the new Stock Exchange Tower on Threadneedle Street. Farage said in 2026 that his mother remarried a local man a few years later and that he is on good terms with both parents.

Farage's paternal grandfather, Harry Farage, served as a private in the First World War and was wounded during the Battle of Arras. It has been suggested that the Farage name comes from a distant French Huguenot ancestor. Both parents of one of Farage's great-grandfathers were Germans who immigrated to London from the Frankfurt area shortly after 1861.

Farage's first school was Greenhayes School for Boys in West Wickham, and he subsequently spent a short period at a similar school in nearby Eden Park. From 1975 to 1982 Farage was educated at Dulwich College, a fee-paying private school in south London. Politicians visited the school, including Keith Joseph, Edward Heath and Enoch Powell. Farage joined the Conservative Party in 1978 after Joseph's visit.

In December 2025 twenty-five former pupils and one ex-teacher at Dulwich College signed an open letter published in The Guardian asking Farage to apologise for alleged racist and antisemitic behaviour during his time there. Other former pupils who knew Farage said that they do not recall the behaviour described. Reform UK responded to the open letter by describing it as "a naked attempt to discredit Reform and Nigel Farage", adding that "the left-wing media and deeply unpopular Labour Party are now using 50-year-old smears in a last act of desperation". Farage denied making any of the comments that were attributed to him.

One Jewish classmate of Farage, Peter Ettedgui, alleged in 2025 that Farage repeatedly made antisemitic remarks targeting him, including "Hitler was right" and "gas 'em". The Guardian reported that eight other pupils have corroborated Ettedgui's account. Farage responded to the allegation by stating: "I categorically deny saying those things" which Ettedgui said was "fundamentally dishonest". Jason Meredith, who was three years below Farage at Dulwich College, alleged to The Guardian that he had been subjected to racist insults, including being called a "paki" and being told to "go back home". Cyrus Oshidar, who was in the same year as Farage, also alleged to The Guardian that Farage called him a "paki". When questioned by ITV News about the allegations of racist behaviour, Farage said: "I don't apologise for things that are complete made-up fantasies. Some of what I heard was just absolute nonsense by people with very obvious, if you looked, political motivation".

One Black former Dulwich College pupil told The Guardian that Farage allegedly made repeated racist remarks targeting him, including "That's the way back to Africa", "simply because of how I looked". Farage denied saying anything racist or antisemitic directly at an individual and suggested that the claims were politically motivated. The author and journalist Michael Crick found equal proportions of Farage's past acquaintances who did, and who did not recall Farage engaging in racist behaviour. According to Crick, as a youth, Farage could be friendly to people of minority ethnicities, and Crick concluded that as an adult, Farage was not a racist. Reverend Neil Fairlamb, a former teacher at Dulwich College, said he did not see racism from Farage—instead referring to him as "objectionable" in a complimentary way.

In 1981, Dulwich staff debated whether his views ought to exclude him from becoming a prefect; ultimately he was appointed. At the time, English teacher Chloë Deakin wrote to David Emms, the head teacher, asking him to reconsider his decision to appoint Farage as a prefect, citing his alleged "publicly professed racist and neo-fascist views". Deakin did not know Farage personally but included, in her letter, an account of what was said by staff at their annual meeting, held a few days earlier, to discuss new prefects. In 2025, Deakin told The Guardian that in 1981 there was discussion amongst pupils referring to Farage as a bully. She also recalled that some colleagues at the time told of his fascination with the far-right, including allegedly "goose‑stepping" during cadet force marches. Deakin added that she believed school leaders had overlooked repeated accounts of troubling behaviour raised by pupils and teachers at the time. David Emms said of Farage's behaviour: "It was naughtiness, not racism" and said that though he "didn't probe too closely into that naughtiness" he was "proved right" to have made Farage a prefect because of his potential.

In his 2010 autobiography, Farage wrote that the outrage was because staff "deplored my spirited defence of Enoch Powell". A deputy headmaster later summarised Farage's argumentation as intentionally antagonistic but facetious. Responding in 2013, Farage stated: "Of course I said some ridiculous things. Not necessarily racist things. It depends how you define it". He acknowledged that his statements as a pupil "would offend deeply".

== Early career ==
After leaving school in 1982, Farage obtained employment in the City of London, as a commodities trader. Initially, he joined the American commodity operation of brokerage firm Drexel Burnham Lambert, transferring to Crédit Lyonnais Rouse in 1986. He joined Refco in 1994, and Natixis Metals in 2003.

== Political career ==
Farage had joined the Conservative Party in 1978, but voted for the Green Party in the 1989 European election due to their Eurosceptic policies. He left the Conservatives in 1992 in protest at Prime Minister John Major's government's signing of the Treaty on European Union at Maastricht. In 1992, Farage joined the Anti-Federalist League. In 1993, he was a founding member of UKIP. In 1994, Farage asked Enoch Powell to endorse UKIP and to stand for them, both of which Powell declined.

Former UKIP leader Alan Sked has alleged that, shortly before the 1997 general election, Farage urged him to drop the party's ban on former National Front members standing as UKIP candidates. According to Sked, when he objected, Farage allegedly replied that they should not "worry about the nigger vote. Nig-nogs will never vote for us". Farage dismissed this allegation as "complete rubbish". When questioned in 2014 about Sked's claim, Farage stated that only Sked had made that allegation and "in politics all sorts of disappointments happen to people and they throw mud".

On 12 September 2006 Farage was elected leader of UKIP with 45 per cent of the vote, 20 percentage points ahead of his nearest rival. He pledged to bring discipline to the party and to maximise UKIP's representation in local, parliamentary and other elections. In a PM programme interview on BBC Radio 4 that day he pledged to end the public perception of UKIP as a single-issue party and to work with allied politicians in the Better Off Out campaign, committing himself not to stand against the MPs who have signed up to that campaign.

In his maiden speech to the UKIP conference, on 8 October 2006, Farage told delegates that the party was "at the centre-ground of British public opinion" and the "real voice of opposition". He said: "We've got three social democratic parties in Britain – Labour, Lib Dem and Conservative are virtually indistinguishable from each other on nearly all the main issues" and "you can't put a cigarette paper between them and that is why there are nine million people who don't vote now in general elections that did back in 1992".

=== European Parliament ===
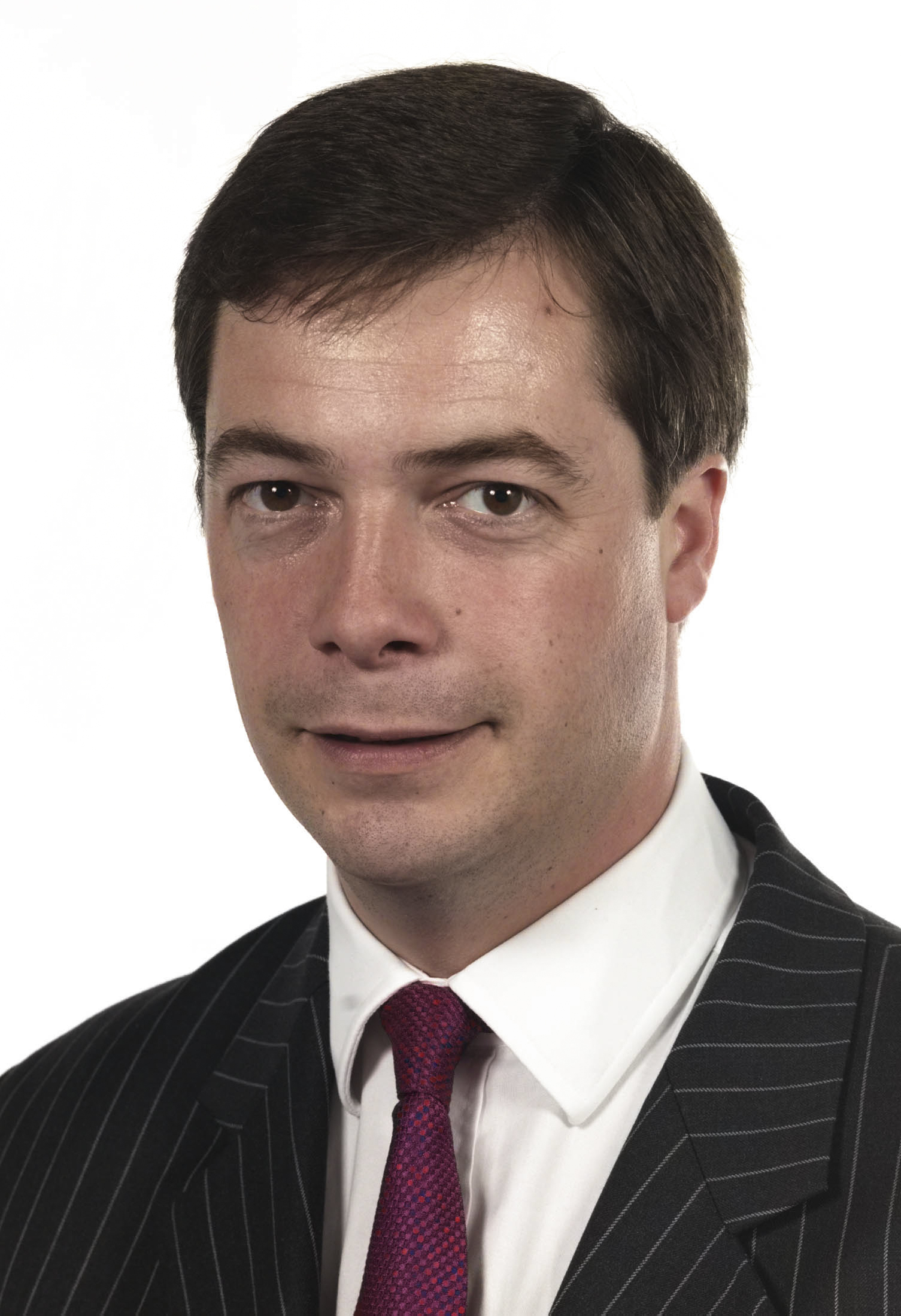
Farage's 1999 portrait as an MEP

Farage was elected to the European Parliament in 1999 and re-elected in 2004, 2009 and 2014. The BBC spent four months filming a documentary about his European election campaign in 1999 but did not air it. Farage, then head of the UKIP's South East office, asked for a video and had friends make copies which were sold for £5 through the UKIP's magazine. Surrey Trading Standards investigated, and no offence was found. Farage was the leader of the 24-member UKIP contingent in the European Parliament, and co-leader of the multinational Eurosceptic group, Europe of Freedom and Direct Democracy. Farage was ranked the fifth-most influential MEP by Politico in 2016, who described him as "one of the two most effective speakers in the chamber". He would be assigned office number 007 in the European Parliament.

On 18 November 2004 Farage announced in the European Parliament that Jacques Barrot, then French Commissioner-designate, had been barred from elected office in France for two years, after being convicted in 2000 of embezzling £2 million from government funds and diverting it into the coffers of his party. He said that French President Jacques Chirac had granted Barrot amnesty; initial BBC reports said that, under French law, it was perhaps illegal to mention that conviction. The prohibition in question applies only to French officials in the course of their duties. The President of the Parliament, Josep Borrell, asked him to retract his comments and warned of potential "legal consequences". The following day, it was confirmed that Barrot had received an eight-month suspended jail sentence in the case, and that this had been quickly expunged by the amnesty decided by Chirac and his parliamentary majority.

In early 2005 Farage requested that the European Commission disclose where the individual Commissioners had spent their holidays. The Commission did not provide the information requested, on the basis that the Commissioners had a right of privacy. The German newspaper Die Welt reported that the President of the European Commission, José Manuel Barroso, had spent a week on the yacht of the Greek shipping billionaire Spiros Latsis. It emerged soon afterwards that this had occurred a month before the Commission under Barroso's predecessor Romano Prodi approved 10.3 million euros of Greek state aid for Latsis's shipping company. It also became known that Peter Mandelson, then the British EU Commissioner, had accepted a trip to Jamaica from an unrevealed source at a debate on 26 May 2005. The motion was heavily defeated. A Conservative MEP, Roger Helmer, was expelled from his group, the European People's Party – European Democrats (EPP-ED), in the middle of the debate by that group's leader Hans-Gert Pöttering as a result of his support for Farage's motion. Farage persuaded around 75 MEPs from across the political divide to back a motion of no confidence in Barroso, which would be sufficient to compel Barroso to appear before the European Parliament to be questioned on the issue. The motion was successfully tabled on 12 May 2005, and Barroso appeared before Parliament.

Charles, Prince of Wales was invited to speak to the European Parliament in February 2008; in his speech he called for EU leadership in the battle against climate change. During the standing ovation that followed, Farage was the only MEP to remain seated, and he went on to describe the Prince's advisers as "naive and foolish at best".

In May 2009 The Observer reported a Foreign Press Association speech given by Farage in which he had said that over his ten years as a Member of the European Parliament he had received a total of £2 million of taxpayers' money in staff, travel, and other expenses. In response, Farage said that in future all UKIP MEPs would provide monthly expense details.

After the speech of Herman Van Rompuy on 24 February 2010 to the European Parliament, Farage – to protests from other MEPs – addressed the former Prime Minister of Belgium and first long-term President of the European Council, saying that he had the "charisma of a damp rag" and the appearance of "a low grade bank clerk". Farage questioned the legitimacy of Van Rompuy's appointment, asking, "Who are you? I'd never heard of you, nobody in Europe had ever heard of you". He also said that Van Rompuy's "intention [is] to be the quiet assassin of European democracy and of the European nation states". Van Rompuy commented afterwards, "There was one contribution that I can only hold in contempt, but I'm not going to comment further". After declining to apologise for behaviour that was, in the words of the President of the European Parliament, Jerzy Buzek, "inappropriate, unparliamentary and insulting to the dignity of the House", Farage was reprimanded and had his right to ten days' allowance (expenses) "docked". Questioned by Camilla Long of The Times, Farage described his speech: "it wasn't abusive, it was right".

In a second visit to Edinburgh in May 2014, Farage correctly predicted that UKIP would win a Scottish seat in the European Parliament elections. Two hundred protesters heckled and booed him. Thirty police in two vans were needed to preserve order.

In the European Parliament elections in 2014, Farage led UKIP to win the highest share of the vote. It was the first time a political party other than the Labour Party and Conservative Party had won the popular vote in a national election since the 1906 general election. It was also the first time a party other than the Labour and Conservatives won the largest number of seats in a national election since the December 1910 general election.

In June 2014, Farage declared £205,603 for gifts over ten years, including free use of a barn for his constituency office, which had been declared in the EU register in Brussels each year. The Electoral Commission said that the gifts should have been also declared in the UK within 30 days of receipt and fined Farage £200.

In November 2014, just days after becoming head of the European Commission, the former Prime Minister of Luxembourg Jean-Claude Juncker was hit by media disclosures—derived from a document leak known as Luxembourg Leaks—that Luxembourg under his premiership had turned into a major European centre of corporate tax avoidance. A subsequent motion of censure in the European Parliament was brought against Juncker over his role in the tax avoidance schemes. The motion was defeated by a large majority. Farage was one of the main drivers behind the censure motion.

During his time in the European Parliament, Farage had one of the lowest attendance and voting records in the history of the institution. During his 21-year tenure as an MEP (1999–2020), parliamentary watchdogs routinely ranked him near the bottom of active lawmakers. As a member of the European Parliament Committee on Fisheries, Farage attended one of 42 recorded meetings over a three-year period. VoteWatch Europe ranked his voting participation at around 37% in his fourth term, placing him, as of January 2018, 748th out of 751 MEPs overall. Byline Times reported that analysis of parliamentary output from 2016 to 2019 showed he submitted one written question and no motions, reports or amendments.

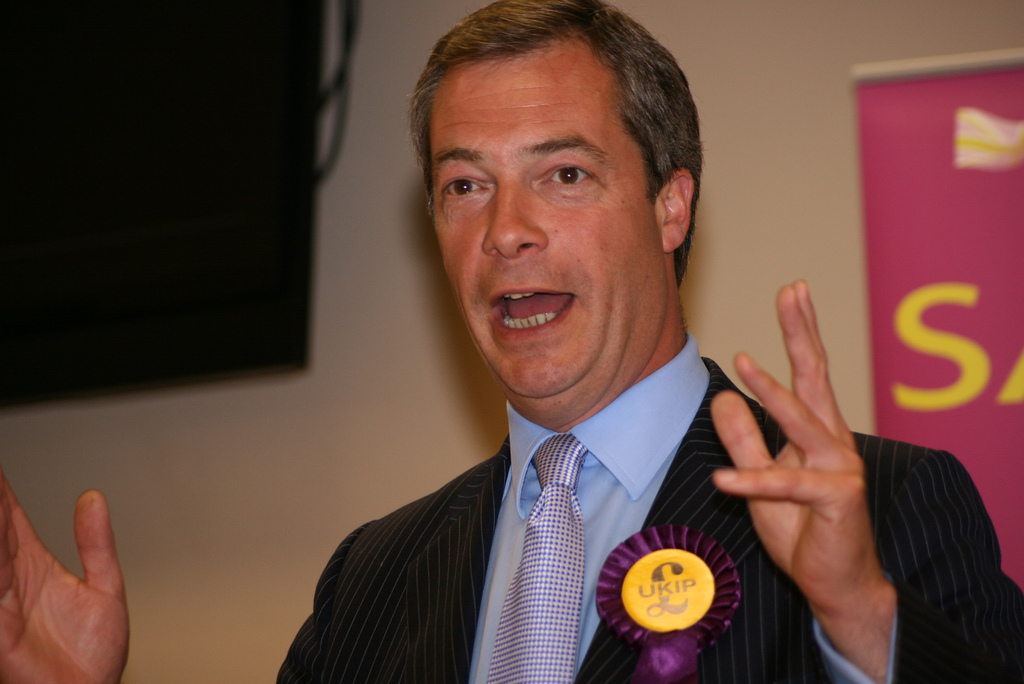
Farage at the UKIP Conference in 2009

=== 2010 general election ===
On 4 September 2009 Farage resigned as UKIP's leader to focus on his campaign to become Member of Parliament for Buckingham at Westminster in the 2010 general election. He later told The Times journalist Camilla Long that UKIP internal fights took up far too much time.

Farage stood against sitting Buckingham MP, John Bercow, the newly elected Speaker of the House of Commons, despite the convention that the Speaker, as a political neutral, is not normally challenged in his or her bid for re-election by any of the major parties. He later said he "miscalculated" the popularity of Bercow in the constituency.

Farage came third with 8,401 votes. Bercow was re-elected with 12,529 votes and in second place with 10,331 votes was John Stevens, a former Conservative MEP who campaigned as an independent accompanied by "Flipper the Dolphin" (a reference to MPs – including Bercow – flipping second homes).

==== Aircraft accident ====
On 6 May 2010, the morning of the election, Farage was travelling in a two-seater PZL-104 Wilga aircraft with a pro-UKIP banner attached, when the plane crashed. His injuries were originally described as minor and non-life-threatening. His sternum and ribs had been broken and his lung punctured. The Air Accidents Investigation Branch (AAIB) report said that the banner became caught in the tailplane, forcing the nose of the aircraft down.

On 1 December 2010, Justin Adams, the pilot involved in the crash, was charged with threatening to kill Farage in a separate incident. He was also charged with threatening to kill an AAIB official involved in the investigation into the accident. In April 2011, Adams was found guilty of making death threats. The judge said that the defendant was "clearly extremely disturbed" at the time the offences happened, adding: "He is a man who does need help. If I can find a way of giving him help I will". Adams was given a two-year supervised community order, and in December 2013 was found dead at home in circumstances that police said were "not being treated as suspicious".

=== 2010–2015 ===
Farage stood again for the UKIP leadership in 2010 after his successor Lord Pearson had stood down, and on 5 November 2010 it was announced he had won the leadership contest.

UKIP forgot to put its party name on its candidate's ballot paper for the 2012 London mayoral election, Laurence Webb appearing as "a fresh choice for London". Farage described the mistake as an internal error. Interviewed the following Sunday by Andrew Neil and asked about "the game plan", Farage welcomed the "average 13% vote" across the country and stated that the party was preparing for county council elections in 2013, the European Parliament election in 2014 and a general election in 2015.

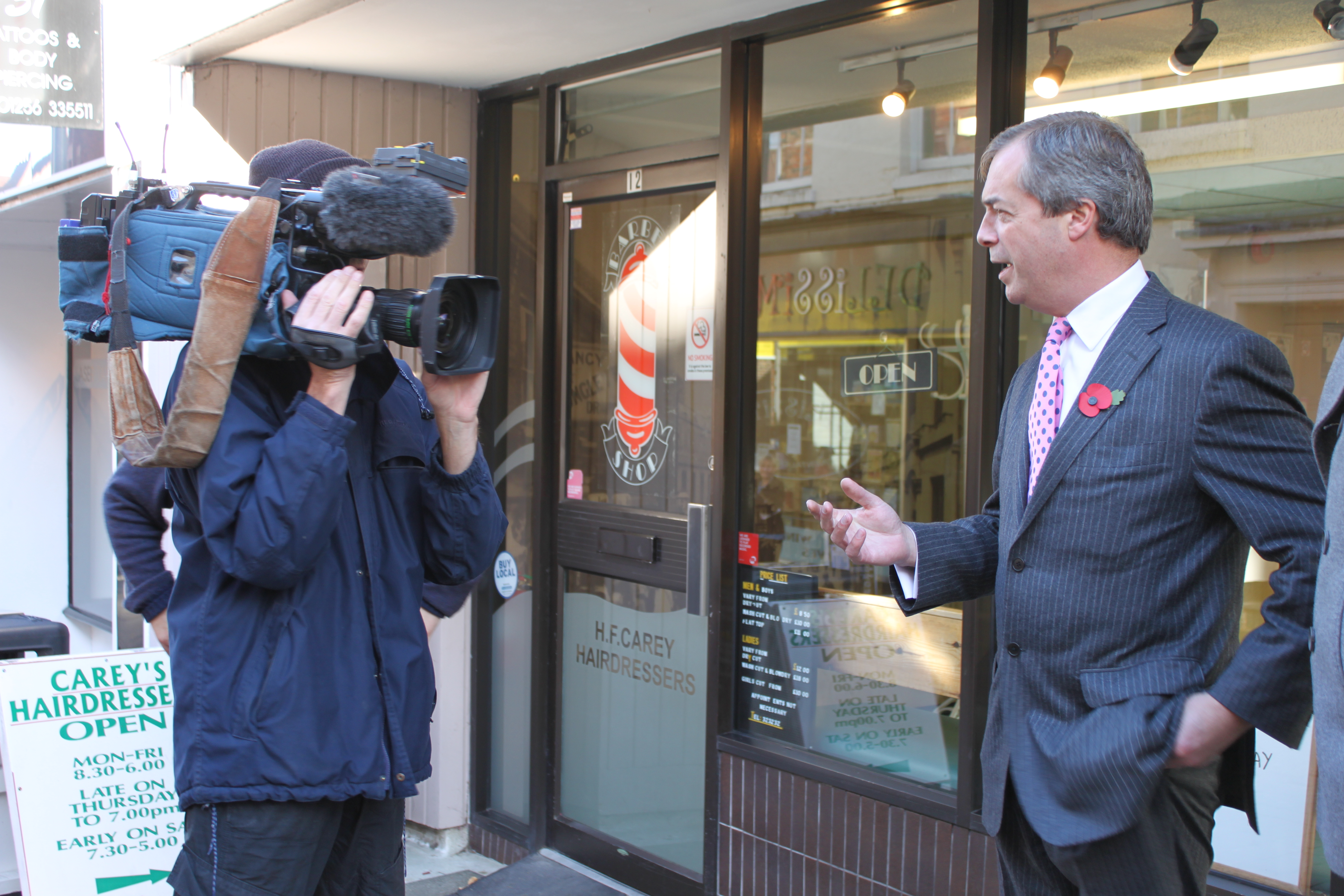
Farage at the opening of the UKIP office in Basingstoke, in 2012

Asked what would happen to UKIP if the Conservatives made a manifesto commitment to a referendum on EU membership, Farage said they had already failed to honour a "cast iron" commitment to a referendum on the Lisbon Treaty. Farage said that UKIP aspired to come top of the European elections, but Neil suggested UKIP were still seen as "unprofessional, amateur and even unacceptable". In the same interview, Farage described Baroness Warsi as "the lowest grade Chairman the Tory Party has ever had".

In May 2013 Farage led UKIP to its best performance in a UK election. The party received 23 per cent of the vote in the local elections, winning 147 council seats, and placing it only two points behind the governing Conservative Party and nine points ahead of the Liberal Democrats. Farage was mobbed by well-wishers as he made his way to his favourite pub, the Marquis of Granby, for a celebratory drink. He called the victory "a real sea change in British politics". Subsequently, polling agency Survation found that 22 per cent of voters intended to support UKIP in the 2015 General Election.

In May 2013 Farage was interrupted by protesters during a press conference in the Canon's Gait pub on Edinburgh's Royal Mile. The demonstration was organised by groups including the Radical Independence Campaign and saw protesters vocally accuse Farage of being "racist", "fascist", and a "homophobe", and tell him to "go back to London". Farage made attempts to leave by taxi but was prevented from doing so, and was eventually taken away in an armoured police van while protesters continued to shout. He was trying to raise the profile of UKIP in Scotland ahead of the Aberdeen Donside by-election; the party at that point had no representation in the country, and took 0.91 per cent of the vote in the previous election though it won its first Scottish MEP the following year. During an interview with BBC's Good Morning Scotland radio show, Farage cut short the exchange, stating that the questions regarding the incident in Edinburgh were insulting and unpleasant.

Farage said in 2013 that he had hired a tax advisor to set up the Farage Family Educational Trust 1654, a trust that Farage said was used "for inheritance purposes", on the Isle of Man. Farage later described this "as standard practice" but stated he "decided I didn't want it. I never ever used it. The Isle of Man is not a tax haven". Farage has since said that this was a mistake: that he was "not rich enough" to need it, that what was seen to be fair 10, 20 or 30 years ago wasn't anymore, and that it cost him money. He has criticised the political discourse surrounding tax avoidance as a "race to the bottom". The BBC reported: "The Isle of Man was one of the UK's crown dependencies which signed an agreement on corporate disclosure at a recent meeting with David Cameron amid claims that individuals and firms are using offshore locations to reduce their tax liabilities", adding that the Isle of Man rejects any allegations that they are used for the purpose of tax avoidance.

In 2013, Farage voiced opposition to same-sex marriage. In October 2014, Farage said that immigrants who are HIV-positive and those with tuberculosis should not be let into the UK and that the UK's public services could not cope with extra demand created by people with severe medical conditions coming to Britain.

Farage had previously denounced tax avoidance in a speech to the European Parliament in which he criticised European bureaucrats who earned £100,000 a year and paid 12 per cent tax under EU rules, Farage said in 2014 that "most legal forms of tax avoidance are ok, but clearly some are not" after he was questioned on why £45,000 of his income was paid into his private company rather than a personal bank account, and that criticism of his actions was "ridiculous". In the wake of the Panama Papers leak, Farage said that the possibility of him releasing his tax return was a "big no" as "I think in this country what people earn is regarded as a private matter", and criticised David Cameron as hypocritical, especially with regard to his past comments about Jimmy Carr's tax avoidance. As of 2019, Farage continued to have fees paid to him via a limited company, Thorn in the Side Ltd.

On 12 September 2014, he appeared at a pro-union rally with Scottish UKIP MEP David Coburn ahead of Scotland's independence referendum.

=== 2015 general election ===
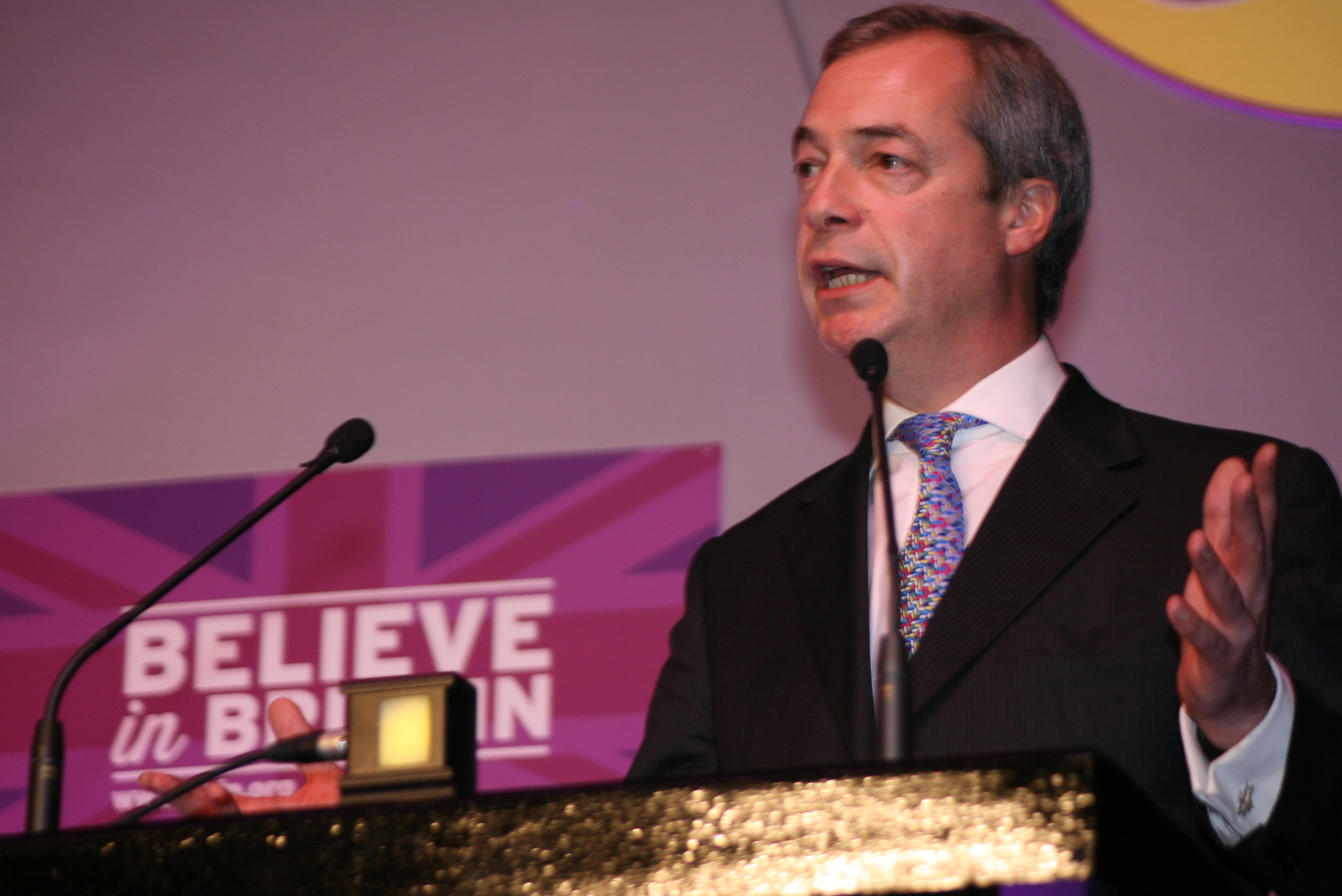
Farage in 2015

In October 2013, Farage announced on the BBC's The Andrew Marr Show that he would stand for election as an MP at the 2015 general election, most likely contesting either Folkestone and Hythe or South Thanet; meanwhile he stated that his duty and preference was to focus on his current role as an MEP.

In August 2014 Farage was selected as the UKIP candidate for South Thanet following local hustings.

In October 2014 Farage was invited to take part in prospective Leaders' debates on BBC, ITV, Channel 4 and Sky ahead of the 2015 general election. UKIP indicated that it would consider taking legal action were the party excluded, in contravention of established broadcast media rules, from televised Leaders' debates in advance of the election. The 7-way Leaders' TV debate was broadcast by ITV on 2 April 2015 from MediaCityUK, Salford Quays. Of three polls taken immediately afterwards, the ComRes poll had Farage as joint winner, alongside Labour's Ed Miliband and Conservative David Cameron.

In March 2015, Farage declared in his book The Purple Revolution that he would step down as UKIP leader should he not be elected as an MP; he stated his belief that it would not be "credible" for him to lead UKIP without sitting in parliament at Westminster.

On 22 March 2015, Farage was targeted by anti-UKIP activists who chased him and his family from a pub lunch in Downe, Greater London. His daughters ran away to hide and were later found to be safe. Farage, when asked what he thought about the incident, called the protesters "scum".

Farage was unsuccessful in his bid to become MP for South Thanet although he came second (beating Labour by over 4,000 votes), reduced the Conservative majority to less than 3,000, and gained over 32% of the vote.

Farage subsequently announced his resignation as the leader of UKIP, citing that he is a "man of his word" since he promised to resign if he did not win his seat, although he kept open the possibility of re-entering the ensuing leadership contest. On 11 May 2015 it was announced that Farage would continue to serve as the party's leader, with the BBC reporting: "Party chairman Steve Crowther said the national executive committee believed the election campaign had been a 'great success' and members had 'unanimously' rejected Mr Farage's letter of resignation". Interviewed about his continued leadership by the BBC the following day, Farage said: "I resigned. I said I'd resign. I turned up to the NEC meeting with letter in hand fully intending to carry that through. They unanimously said they didn't want me to do that, they presented me with petitions, signatures, statements from candidates saying it would be a bad thing for UKIP. So I left the meeting, went and sat in darkened room to think about what to do, and decided for the interest of the party I would accept their kind offer for me to stay and tear up the letter". He added that he would consider standing for parliament again should a by-election be called in a Labour-held seat.

A row subsequently developed within the party, in which MEP and campaign chief Patrick O'Flynn described Farage's public image as "snarling, thin-skinned, aggressive" and said he risked turning the party into a "personality cult". O'Flynn accused Farage of paying too much attention to advisors that "would like to take UKIP in the direction of some hard-right, ultra-aggressive American Tea Party-type movement", singling out the NHS and gun control liberalisation as particular issues. Raheem Kassam, Farage's chief of staff and editor of Breitbart London was later dismissed as a result, whilst O'Flynn stated that he continued to support Farage as party leader. Farage also faced a number of calls from senior figures within the party to stand down.

Following the election, a UKIP spokesman acknowledged that after a series of threatening attacks on Farage it had sent an informant into the Thanet branch of the protest organisation Stand Up to UKIP, stating "in order to provide reasonable security it was of course necessary to have information from the inside", an approach he said was used by "a great many security operations tasked with protecting the safety and wellbeing of a targeted individual". According to The Guardian, the informant is alleged to have actively encouraged members to commit criminal damage. Farage had said he was the victim of "trade union-funded activists" who were inciting vandalism.

=== Brexit ===
==== 2016 referendum ====
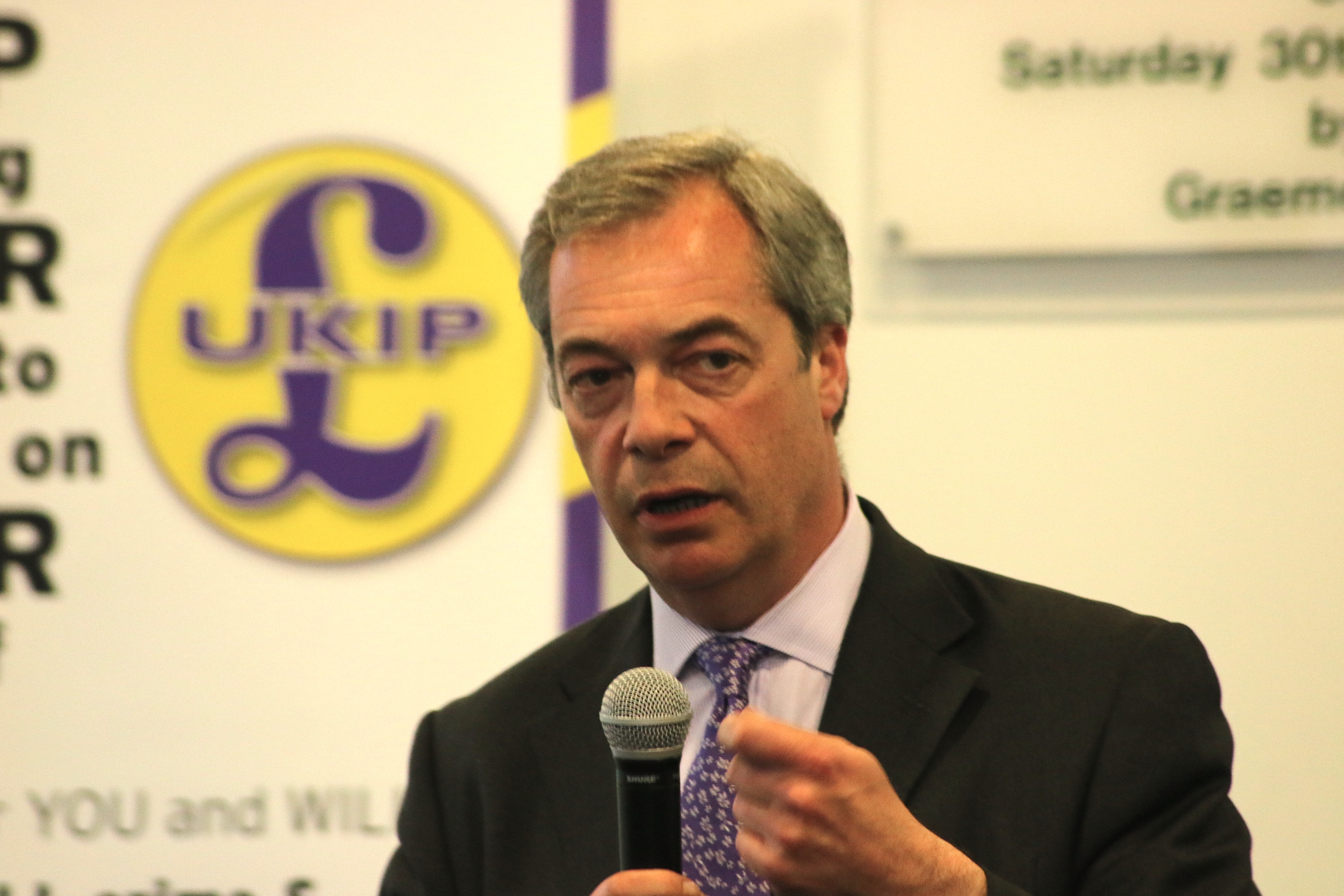
Farage in 2016

Farage was a key figurehead in the Brexit campaign of 2016, which succeeded with 52 per cent of the vote. Jean-Claude Juncker promptly told all UKIP members to leave the Parliament. During the campaign, Farage had made the suggestion of a future second referendum should the Brexit campaign be unsuccessful, but the result be closer than 52–48.

Farage initially supported Vote Leave (led by Dominic Cummings and Matthew Elliott, supported by Boris Johnson and Michael Gove) and Leave.EU (led by Arron Banks) in their campaigns to leave the EU, saying that they reached "different audiences"; however, he later grew irritated at Vote Leave's marginalisation of the UKIP-backed Grassroots Out movement, and their lack of explicit focus on immigration as an issue. He blamed this on the senior "apparatchiks" within the party (i.e. Cummings and Elliott) who purposefully marginalised Farage during the campaign, believing his attitudes on immigration deterred swing voters. The Daily Telegraph quoted Farage as saying that: "[Cummings] has never liked me. He can't stand the ERG. I can't see him coming to any accommodation with anyone. He has huge personal enmity with the true believers in Brexit".

Farage has argued strongly in favour of a British Independence Day being observed within the United Kingdom, on 23 June each year. On 24 June 2016, in a televised speech on the morning of the Brexit result, he stated, "let 23 June go down in our history as our Independence Day".

==== 2016–2019 ====
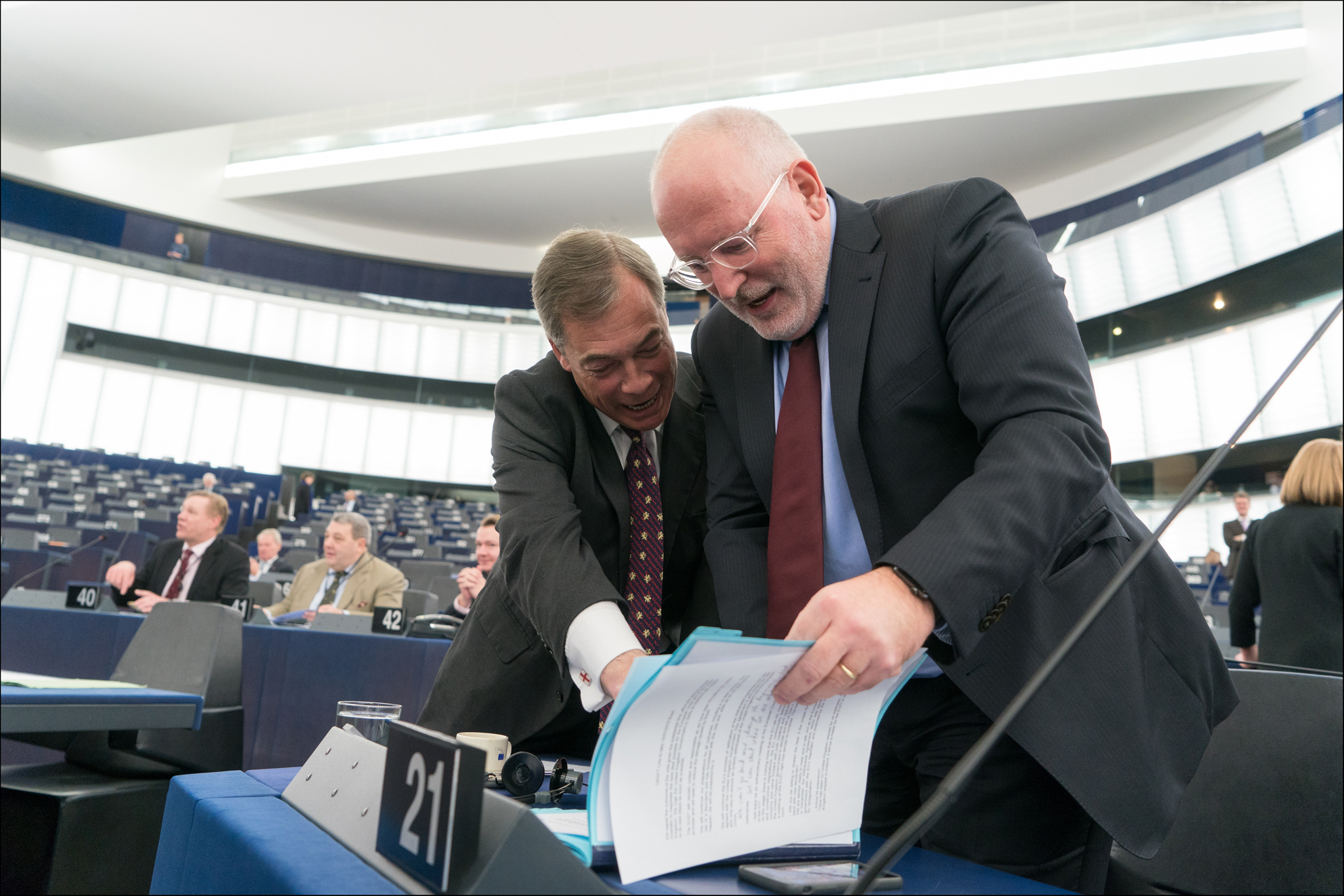
Farage in the European Parliament plenary session in January 2019 with Frans Timmermans

On 28 June 2016, Farage made a speech in the European Parliament in which he stated that a hypothetical failure for the EU to forge a trade deal with an exiting UK would "be far worse for you than it would be for us", to heckling and laughing by Parliament members. He said of his fellow MEPs that "virtually none" of them had ever done "a proper job" in their lives. Farage also said: "when I came here 17 years ago, and I said that I wanted to lead a campaign to get Britain to leave the European Union, you all laughed at me. Well I have to say, you're not laughing now are you?" He also predicted that Britain would not be the only country to leave the EU. In response, Guy Verhofstadt compared Farage's referendum posters with Nazi propaganda and credited the Brexit campaign with causing a multi-billion loss in the stock exchange.

Farage resigned as leader of UKIP on 4 July 2016. He stated, "It's right that I should now stand aside as leader. What I said during the referendum campaign is I want my country back. What I'm saying today is I want my life back. And it begins right now". He added that this resignation was final: "I won't be changing my mind again, I can promise you", apparently referring to his two previous resignations (in 2009 and 2015). Jean-Claude Juncker, President of the European Commission, described Farage as a "retro-nationalist", Writing in The Spectator, journalist Rod Liddle described Farage as: "The most important British politician of the last decade and the most successful. His resignation leaves a hole in our political system. With enormous intelligence and chutzpah and a refreshingly unorthodox approach, he built UKIP up from nothing to become established as our third largest party and succeeded in his overriding ambition – to see the UK vote to leave the European Union". Diane James was elected as Farage's replacement, however she signed the declaration of acceptance with vi coactus after her signature which meant the Electoral Commission could not legally process the change of leadership. James opted not to accept the leadership, leading to Farage continuing as interim leader due to still being recognised by the Electoral Commission until Paul Nuttall was elected in November.

From 18 to 21 July 2016, Farage attended the 2016 Republican National Convention in Cleveland, Ohio. After meeting governor of Mississippi Phil Bryant on the final day of the convention, Farage was invited to a fundraising dinner in the state in August where he met future President of the United States, Donald Trump, for the first time, going on to speak at a rally for Trump later that day.

Following a legal challenge by Gina Miller to the use of the Royal Prerogative to invoke article 50, Farage appeared on The Andrew Marr Show with Miller. She stated that "politicians had lied all the way through" and that the Referendum Act clearly said that the result was advisory. Farage accepted that it was advisory but said afterwards "I just want to ask her – what part of the word 'leave' don't you understand?". Farage talked of a peaceful protest and warned of unprecedented political anger if Parliament blocked Brexit. Miller said that parliamentary democracy required parliament to debate issues and that Farage had spent the whole Brexit campaign arguing for parliamentary sovereignty. Calling his warnings "the politics of the gutter", Tim Farron said the British judges had merely interpreted British law and that fortunately Farage was the only person talking about taking to the streets.

On 7 November 2016, Farage announced he would lead a 100,000 strong march to the Supreme Court, timed for when it started hearing the Government appeal. On 27 November 2016, it was reported the march was being cancelled out of concerns it could be hijacked by the far-right groups English Defence League and the British National Party. The next day, Paul Nuttall became the new UKIP party leader after Farage decided to step aside to strengthen his relationship with US President-elect Donald Trump.

In 2017 Farage called for the departure of UKIP's only MP, Douglas Carswell. He said in The Daily Telegraph: "there is little future for UKIP with him staying inside this party. The time for him to go is now". There was reportedly controversy within the party over whether Carswell had tried to prevent Farage receiving a knighthood. It was reported the MP had suggested Farage should instead be given an OBE "for services to headline writers".

On 20 April 2017 Farage announced that he would not contest the 2017 general election. He said that he believed he could further advance his version of Brexit as a leader of a group in the European Parliament.

In May 2018, Farage addressed a fundraising event for the Democratic Unionist Party with his main financial backer, Arron Banks, who accompanied Farage during the event, stating that he would support a bid by Farage to seek office as a DUP candidate after the end of his tenure as Member of the European Parliament in 2019. In 2018 he joined Leave Means Leave as vice-chairman.

On 4 December 2018 Farage announced "with a heavy heart" on his live LBC radio show that effective immediately he had resigned his membership of UKIP, after 25 years as a member of the party. In explanation, Farage mentioned UKIP leader Gerard Batten's appointment the previous month of far-right activist Tommy Robinson as an adviser and the National Executive of UKIP's voting in a no-confidence vote to keep Batten as leader of the party. Farage argued that Batten was "obsessed with the issue of Islam, not just Islamic extremism, but Islam... UKIP wasn't founded to be a party fighting a religious crusade". He also said that association with Robinson damaged the image of Brexit.

In May 2019, British broadcaster Channel 4 News reported it had seen invoices for travel and accommodation expenses between 2016 and 2017. It further reported that these benefits, worth "as much as £450,000", were funded by Arron Banks, and were not declared on Farage's register of interests, which he should have done as a serving MEP. Liberal Democrat MEP Catherine Bearder, in her role as a quaestor (an MEP responsible for financial and administrative matters), raised the issue and this resulted in an official investigation opening on 21 May 2019. When asked by the BBC about the matter Farage replied, "Whatever happened after the referendum – I was leaving politics, it happened mostly in America, it had nothing to do with politics, nothing to do with the Brexit Party, it was purely on a personal basis. I was looking for a new career and a new life – it's got nothing to do with anything, it's a purely private matter".

=== Reform UK ===
Farage has been leader of Reform UK since June 2024. Reform UK, formerly the Brexit Party, is a right-wing populist and far-right political party in the United Kingdom. It has eight members of Parliament in the House of Commons, two members of the London Assembly, thirty-four members of the Senedd, seventeen members of the Scottish Parliament, one police and crime commissioner, and controls twenty-six local councils. It is to the right of the Conservative Party.

Reform is a limited company (Reform UK Party Limited) with fifteen shares. Farage owned 53% of the shares in the company, giving him a controlling majority. In August 2024, Paul Oakden was removed and Farage took over his share, giving him 60% ownership.

The incorporation of the Brexit Party in November 2018 was formally announced on 20 January 2019 by former UK Independence Party (UKIP) economics spokesperson Catherine Blaiklock, who served as the Brexit Party's initial leader. On 8 February 2019, it was approved by the Electoral Commission to run candidates in English, Scottish, Welsh and European Union elections.

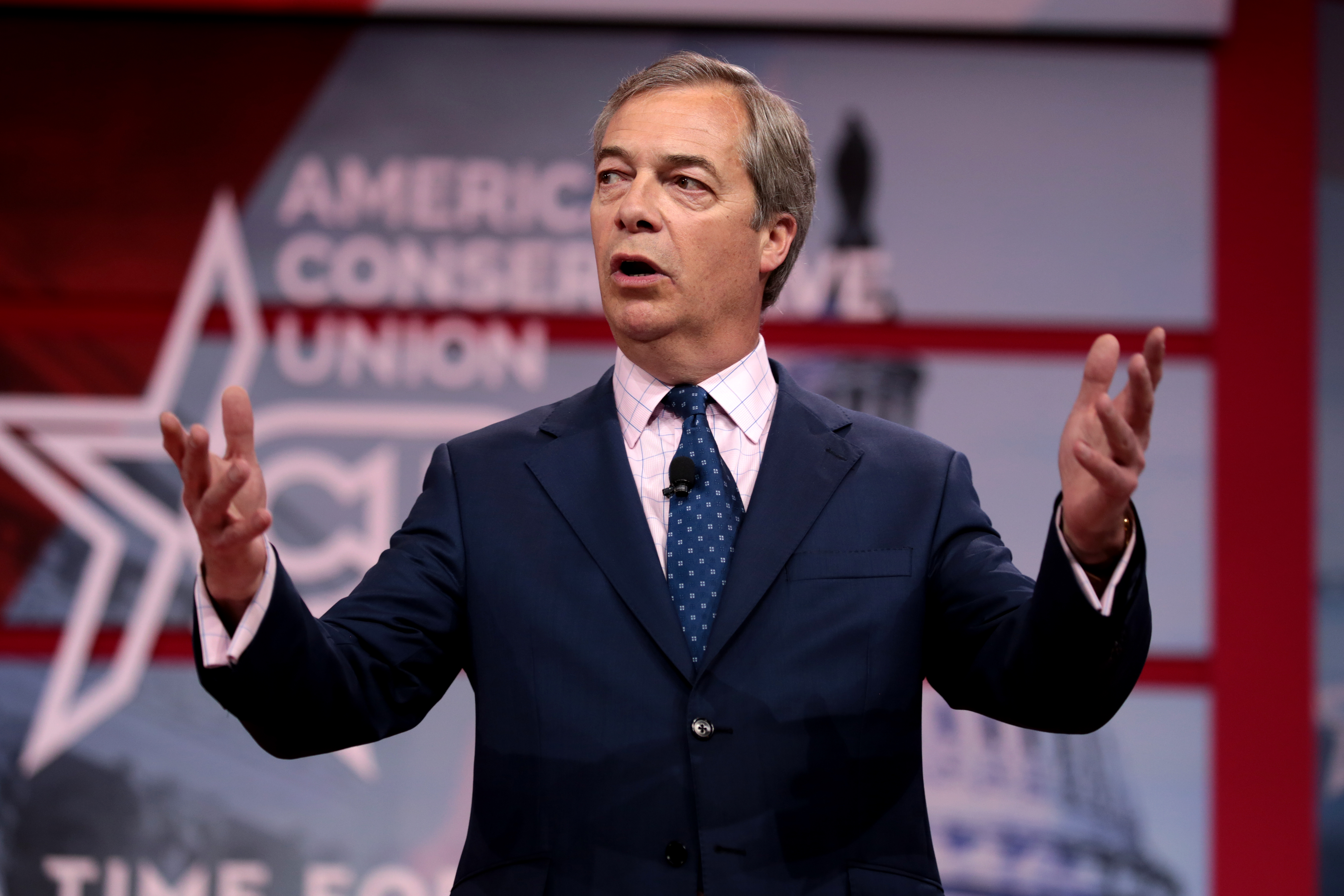
Farage at the Conservative Political Action Conference (CPAC) in the US in 2018

On 13 February, Farage confirmed he would sit in the European Parliament as a member of the Brexit Party.

==== Leader of Reform UK ====
On 22 March, he was announced as the new party leader, following the resignation of Catherine Blaiklock.

On 20 May 2019, a Brexit opponent threw a milkshake at Farage in Newcastle upon Tyne. The assailant, who was arrested at the scene, accused Farage of "spouting bile and racism". Farage tweeted about the incident saying: "For a civilised democracy to work you need the losers' consent, politicians not accepting the referendum result have led us to this". A month later, 32-year-old Paul Crowther pleaded guilty to common assault and criminal damage at Tyneside Magistrates' Court, where District Judge Bernard Begley ordered him to carry out 150 hours of community service and pay £350 compensation to Farage.

==== Hiatus from politics ====
On 6 March 2021, Farage announced in an interview with The Telegraph that he was retiring from politics and resigning as leader of Reform UK, although he intended to continue "influencing the debate" through social media. He became the party's honorary president and was replaced as the party's leader by Richard Tice. In July 2021, Farage criticised the Royal National Lifeboat Institution, accusing them of being a "taxi service" for illegal immigrants. This provoked a major public backlash – donations to the service rose 3000% in the wake of the remarks and a fundraiser on GoFundMe raised over £120,000 to purchase a new rescue hovercraft for the charity with a suggestion the boat be christened The Flying Farage. In November 2021, Farage published an op-ed in The Daily Telegraph contemplating a return to frontline politics, due to the English Channel migrant crossings and what he perceived as the Prime Minister's indifference to the issue.

Farage launched the Vote Power Not Poverty campaign to secure a referendum on Johnson's government's pledge to achieve net zero carbon emissions by 2050.

In May 2023, Farage told BBC Newsnight that Brexit had failed due to the policies of successive Conservative governments, saying that their policies meant that the UK did not benefit economically from leaving the bloc.

In September 2023, Farage was ranked first on the New Statesman's Right Power List, describing him as "the most influential person on the British right". In February 2024, Farage said that he was "open-minded" about joining the Conservative Party after the general election, more than 30 years after he left the party.

In November 2024, Farage was not invited to speak at a farmers' protest outside Downing Street, with organisers citing concerns that his involvement could politicise the event, particularly in light of Brexit's impact on agriculture. While some close to Farage claimed political pressure from the Conservative Party, the organisers stressed the protest was focused on farmers' issues, such as controversial inheritance tax changes. Farage voiced support on social media, but many farmers opposed his presence, believing it would detract from their cause.

==== Second term as Leader of Reform UK ====
At a news conference on 3 June 2024, Farage announced both his intention to become leader of Reform UK once again and his candidature for the party in the Clacton constituency. He previously said he would not stand in the election, but changed his mind after people had asked him to run.

On his first day of campaigning in Clacton-on-Sea, Farage had a banana milkshake thrown over him by a member of the crowd. A 25-year-old woman was arrested on suspicion of assault. Farage appeared to make a joke about the incident later in the day, when he appeared in front of the media in the village of Jaywick with a tray of milkshakes. On 12 June, Farage had a paper cup and an unidentified object thrown at him whilst campaigning on an open-top bus. A 28-year-old man was arrested on suspicion of public order offences. Farage said that he would not be cowed by the incident. He was subsequently provided with private security.

==== Member of Parliament (2024–2026) ====
On 4 July 2024, Farage won the Clacton seat, with 46.2% of the vote, becoming an MP for the first time.

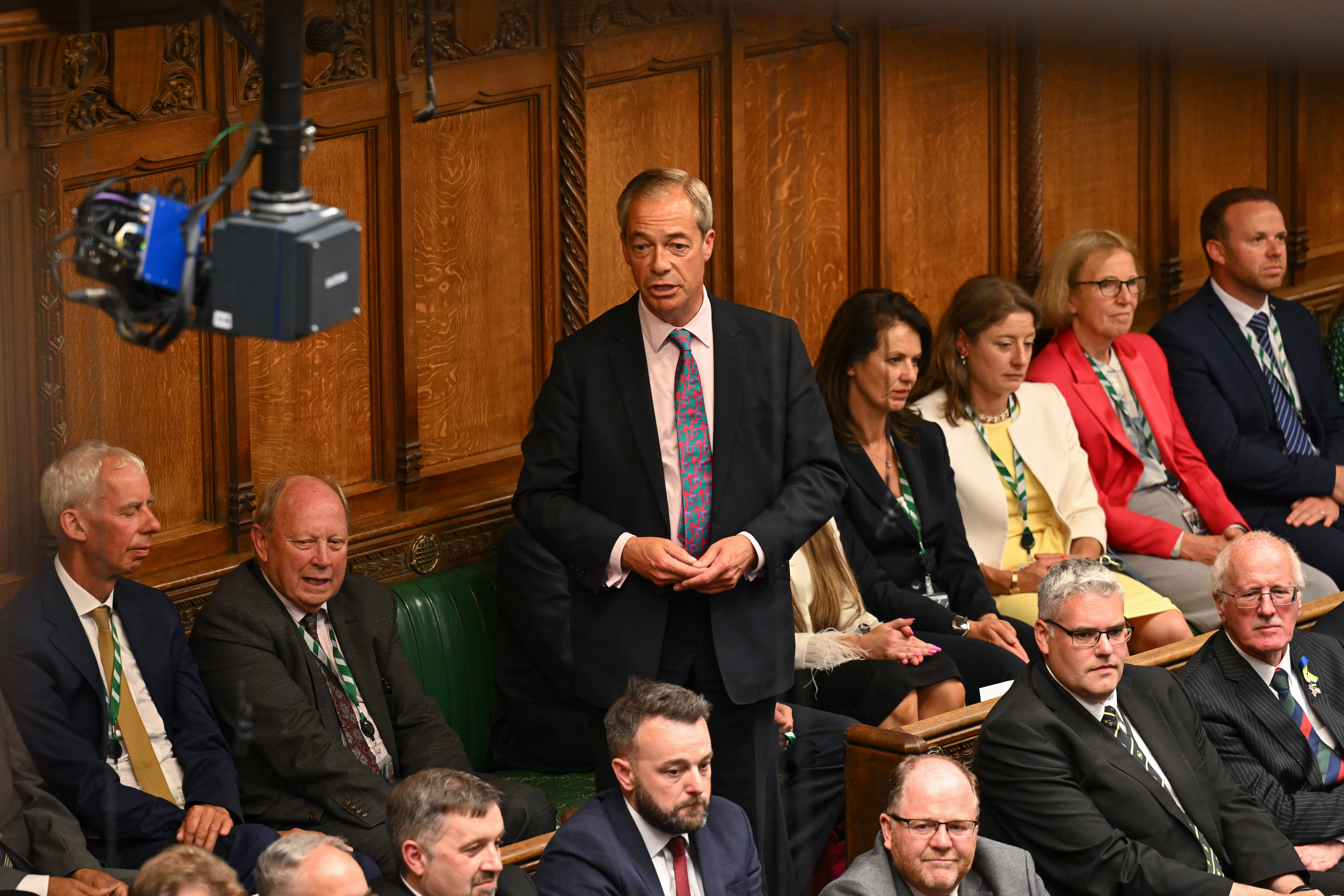
Farage speaking in the House of Commons, 9 July 2024

Amid riots in July and August 2024 following a mass stabbing in Southport, Farage condemned the disorder, stating: "The levels of intimidation and threat to life have no place in a functioning democracy". He called for Parliament to be recalled over the riots and suggested there was a widespread impression of "two-tier policing" as a result of "soft policing" during Black Lives Matter protests, which he said contributed to a "sense of injustice".

Farage was criticised by the former head of UK counter-terrorism, Neil Basu, for questioning whether the truth was being withheld from the public, with Basu accusing Farage of inciting violence and creating conspiracy theories. Farage was also accused by Steve Rotheram, the Mayor of Liverpool City Region, of giving legitimacy to acts of violence, after releasing a video in which he said he did not support violence, but that the protests were "nothing to what could happen over the course of the next few weeks".

Following revised November 2024 data showing net immigration to the United Kingdom reached a record 906,000 for the year ending June 2023, Farage described the figures as "horrendous," stating he had had "enough of being lied to" by the Conservatives and suggested the situation would be "even worse" under Labour.

In January 2025, Farage was the guest of honour at the launch of a climate denying lobby group, which was also attended by former UK prime minister, Liz Truss and Conservative Party shadow minister, Andrew Griffith.

In March 2025, in an interview with the Daily Mail, Reform MP Rupert Lowe criticised the governance of Reform UK as "a protest party led by the Messiah", suggesting he might leave the party if things did not change, and saying it was too early to tell if Nigel Farage would make a good prime minister. Farage disputed Lowe's criticism of himself and Reform UK, describing his personal following as a good thing, and went on to suggest Lowe's remarks were driven by a desire to be Prime Minister himself.

In April 2025, The Independent reported that Farage travelled to Kuala Lumpur, where he was paid £40,000 to deliver a speech for an event hosted by Nomad Capitalist; a company that helps the super-rich to move to other countries to reduce their tax bills.

On 3 September 2025, he travelled to the US and testified before the Republican-led House judiciary committee about the state of free speech in the UK; he criticised British hate speech laws and the implementation of the Online Safety Act 2023, likening Starmer's government to the North Korean regime.

In September 2025, Farage suggested that swans from Royal Parks were being eaten and that carp were being taken out of ponds by eastern European migrants.

In February 2026, protesters travelled to the Chagos Archipelago, their former homeland, aiming to permanently settle in the UK territory and complicate plans to cede the islands to Mauritius. Farage flew to the nearby Maldives intending to travel aboard a yacht that was due to resupply them on Île du Coin. Ultimately, instead of boarding the boat, he said that the British and Maldives governments had blocked him from participating in a "humanitarian mission". The Telegraph reported that the prospect of Farage's presence had put the resupply voyage in doubt, and Farage said that he did not "want [his] presence to jeopardise that". Farage said he was exploring legal avenues to support the activists' cause. Speaking in London, Farage subsequently noted that they had been placed in peril of imprisonment because the Foreign Office considers it illegal to enter the territory without a valid permit, and had served them with eviction orders. Reform UK declined to state whether Farage had himself sought the permit required for legal entry.

Farage said in June 2026 that politicians had created "a backdoor for anti-white discrimination" and that Reform UK would ban foreign nationals from living in social housing. He said that a Reform government would limit schools to celebrating "accepted civic events" and that "pupils should not be forced to celebrate Black History Month, Pride Month and Refugee Week".

In June 2026, Farage declared in the list of MPs' interests that he had been paid £270,000 for advertising gold bullion for four hours work a month over three months.

=== Financial allegations and resignation as Member of Parliament ===
In April 2026, it was reported that in early 2024, Farage was given £5 million by British cryptocurrency investor Christopher Harborne, a Thailand-based businessman. Within weeks of receiving the money, Farage announced his intention to stand in the 2024 general election, reversing his earlier position not to stand. Harborne, who had previously donated funds to the Conservative Party and given £1 million to Boris Johnson to run his private office after he resigned as Prime Minister, went on to become Reform UK's largest donor, giving the party £12 million in 2025. Reform UK responded by stating: "This was a personal unconditional gift that was given before he was elected. We are confident everything has been declared in accordance with the rules". This is disputed by other MPs, as the Parliamentary Code of Conduct requires relevant financial benefits received in the 12 months before becoming an MP to be declared. Farage said the money was for his personal security. He subsequently described it as a reward for campaigning for Brexit over many years. The undisclosed gift is being investigated by the Parliamentary Commissioner for Standards, while the Electoral Commission is considering whether to investigate. The Parliamentary investigation could conclude in recommending a suspension, which if of sufficient length would lead to a recall petition and possible by-election.

In September 2026, the Metropolitan Police opened a criminal investigation into allegations that Reform UK had breached rules on foreign donations following an undercover Channel 4 investigation. Farage said Reform UK denied wrongdoing and would cooperate with the investigation.

Weeks after receiving the £5 million, Farage bought a house for £1.4 million in Surrey. Farage's spokesperson said that Farage had paid for the house with his approximately £1.5 million fee from I'm a Celebrity... Get Me Out of Here! in 2023 and that he had not used the money from Harborne. However, the Financial Times reported that corporate accounts for Farage's personal media company appeared to show the I'm a Celebrity money remaining in the company's account, and not being used.

The initial reporting about the £5 million was by The Guardian newspaper. Farage and Reform UK alleged that the information originated from a Russian hack of his phone and email—a statement which The Guardian's spokesperson described as avoidance of financial scrutiny. As of 25 May 2026, Farage had not contacted the National Cyber Security Centre over the matter. Ciaran Martin, the former chief executive of the NCSC, described Farage's claim as "entirely unsubstantiated".

Further allegations followed that Farage had received benefits from convicted criminal George Cottrell and not declared them.

Cottrell is reported to have supported Farage by providing social media and security staff, and also providing Farage with accommodation in his property in London. There is controversy as to whether these should have been reported by Farage in the Register of Members' Financial Interests, with Reform UK's Treasury spokesperson Robert Jenrick stating that these were made in a "purely personal capacity". Payments by Cottrell for Farage's travel arrangements had been declared by Farage previously.

The Guardian reported that a number of financial transactions by Farage and Reform UK have been filed as Suspicious Activity Reports by the National Crime Agency.

On 2 August 2026 The Sunday Times reported that Farage and Tice had secretly agreed, some time in March–April 2024, with the aid of Cottrell, for Farage to take over as leader, much earlier than previously reported, in return for the repayment or writing off of outstanding loans of more that £1 million to Tice's company. Farage said that those questioning his financial backing were "demonising" him in a "coordinated pile-on" to stop Reform UK. When asked if he had negotiated a deal on Reform's finances if he returned as leader, Farage said that he spoke to Tice, but denied it was an agreement or deal, stating: "If you want clarification on this, that came quite some time after the gift, which is perhaps the important point."

==== Resignation as Member of Parliament and by-election victory ====
On 7 July 2026, Farage announced that he was resigning as an MP to trigger a by-election in Clacton, and that he intended to stand for re-election. On the following day, 8 July 2026, he was appointed Steward of the Manor of Northstead, which formalised his resignation. At the time of his resignation he was under investigation by the parliamentary authorities over two separate issues relating to allegations that he had not made the necessary declarations of gifts he had received from close associates before he became an MP – the £5m from Christopher Harborne and undeclared donations from George Cottrell. If re-elected, Parliament's rules dictated that the investigations into his actions would resume.

In his resignation announcement Farage said that the investigations were being used as a political tool against him, and that he wanted the voters of Clacton to be the ultimate judge of his actions. He insisted he had done nothing wrong, but that "the establishment" was out to get him. He said that he was the most targeted politician in Britain, and thus needed private security and that he intended to use the £5m to cover that for the rest of his life. (Note: As an example of security threats against him, Farage said his home had been targeted by an arson attack using a petrol bomb in 2025. The police report of the incident did not reference arson and described it as an attempted robbery. In August 2026, triggered by the Ann Widdecombe murder investigation, the investigation was reopened by Counter Terrorism Policing (CTP) London. On 10 August Farage said that the incident at his London home was "directly linked" to the murder.) Farage also accused the media of harassing his family in relation to the controversy, and said that the media turning up outside his daughter's home was the "final straw". Sky News denied contacting anyone from Farage's family and said that it was the address where Farage was registered to vote at the previous election. Conservative MP Ben Obese-Jecty said that Farage had used the house as a backdrop for photoshoots in the past.

In July, a person was arrested by the London Metropolitan Police for an alleged threat to shoot Farage made in a social media post. They were released on bail, pending further inquiries. Farage said that he was aware of as many as 400 similar social media posts from 2026.

On 13 August Farage won the Clacton by-election, reclaiming the seat with 63.3% of the vote, although the poll was boycotted by all of the main Westminster parties. The second placed candidate, Count Binface, who is a novelty candidate, won 27% of the vote.

=== Public opinion ===
Farage is known for his social media presence, his fashion sense, as well as his form of British right-wing populism. He was ranked second in The Daily Telegraph's "Top 100 most influential right-wingers poll" in 2013, behind Cameron, and was also named "Briton of the Year" by The Times in 2014. A September 2025 Ipsos poll of general election voting intention gave Farage's Reform UK 34% against Starmer's Labour's 22%. On who would make the most capable prime minister, respondents gave Farage (25%) a clear lead over Starmer (19%) and Badenoch (9%), though there was "little enthusiasm" for those party leaders (47% picked none of them). In polling around November 2025, compared to when Starmer became prime minister in July 2024, Farage's net approval rating increased from −30% to −16% whilst Starmer's dropped from +10% to −49%. By July 2026, Farage's popularity had decreased, with 22% approving of him and a net favourability of -46%.

Following his 2026 resignation as an MP and decision to stand again for election in Clacton, polling by Ipsos found that 54% of adults across Great Britain believed that Farage ought to leave parliament without running for re-election, versus 16% who felt he should contest the election, and 16% who felt he should not have resigned at all. 73% supported the continuation of the parliamentary inquiry, even if Farage were to win. The same week, another countrywide poll identified Farage as the "sleaziest politician in Britain". YouGov found that overall, 73% believe he is "very" or "fairly sleazy", the highest figure among party leaders (51% for Keir Starmer, 42% for Zack Polanski, 36% for Andy Burnham and 34% for Kemi Badenoch). Even among recent Reform UK voters, 40% believed that Farage was sleazy.

A late 2025 YouGov poll found that Farage is less popular among ethnic minorities than the wider public, with 13% having a favourable opinion while 79% have an unfavourable one.

== Media career ==
=== Fox News ===
On 20 January 2017, the day of Trump's presidential inauguration, US news channel Fox News announced it had hired Farage as a commentator. He has since provided political analysis for both the main Fox News channel and its sister channel Fox Business Network.

=== LBC ===
From January 2017 to June 2020 Farage hosted The Nigel Farage Show on the UK talk radio station LBC on Monday to Thursday evenings.

In March 2019, Farage said on his show that Channel 4 journalist Jon Snow "should be attacked" for his "condescending bias" during coverage of a pro-Brexit protest. Ofcom decided that Farage had not broken their broadcasting code since he clarified that he meant a verbal attack.

On 31 October 2019, the day the UK was set to leave the European Union before the approval of a delay, Farage interviewed US President Donald Trump on his LBC show. Trump criticised Prime Minister Boris Johnson's Brexit deal, saying it made it difficult for the UK to strike a trade deal with the US.

From March 2018 to July 2018, Farage hosted a podcast under the LBC banner entitled Farage Against The Machine, a play on words for the term 'rage against the machine', where he discussed the latest political developments and political news with political figures who Farage both agrees, and disagrees with. New episodes of the podcast were released every Friday, but the podcast was cancelled after the American rock music band Rage Against the Machine sent a cease and desist letter to Farage, demanding that Farage change the name of the podcast, which he was unwilling to do, prompting LBC to reluctantly trigger its cancellation.

=== GB News ===
In June 2021, Farage joined the British news channel GB News to host the Sunday morning political discussion programme The Political Correction. In July 2021, he began hosting the Monday to Thursday evening show Farage. As of August 2024 Farage was earning nearly £1.2m a year from GB News. Farage later said he did not get a fixed monthly fee from GB News, but was paid varying amounts as a contractor. The sum disclosed to the register was a gross sum, including VAT, for work carried out since 1 April 2024, and also included services such as media consultancy, in addition to his work as television presenter.

=== Cameo videos ===
Cameo customers pay a fee for a chosen celebrity, Farage in this case, to produce a short video clip for them, of usually less than a minute, based on an outline script that they provide. Farage joined Cameo in 2021 and by 2026 had published more than 4,000 personalised clips. From the start of his tenure as an MP in 2024, until early 2026, Farage disclosed earnings of more than £80,000 from these Cameo recordings. Liberal Democrat MP Max Wilkinson criticised Farage, alleging that "[f]or the right price, he will apparently say almost anything".

Due to Farage's openness to accepting almost any Cameo payments, he has become a victim of a number of pranks, though these have also included him referencing more innocent Internet memes. For example, in 2021, he was made to refer to various Irish republican slogans, as well as citing internet memes such as Among Us and Big Chungus.

In March 2026, The Guardian reported that in the videos, Farage had been paid to repeat some extremist slogans, support a convicted far-right rioter, reference antisemitic conspiracy theories, and endorse an event for Canadian neo-Nazi group Diagolon. In response a spokesperson for the Reform MP said: Farage had used the platform "in good faith and without knowledge of the individuals involved beyond what is written for him" and that "Mr Farage has recorded many thousands of videos for genuine supporters to celebrate weddings, congratulate friends or send novelty messages. At that scale, the occasional mistake can occur". Farage subsequently stopped offering the service, with Reform UK saying it was "paused for security reasons".

Farage also used Cameo videos to call attention to cryptocurrency, which he said was "being ignored in this general election". In a video announcement, he expressed enthusiasm for the memecoin named after him, noting that while speculative, it was "gathering support from the Reform UK cryptocurrency community". The so-called Farage coin (Note: There was no known connection between Farage and the cryptocurrency bearing his name.) was linked to a pledge to donate money to Reform UK upon reaching a certain valuation.

=== I'm a Celebrity... Get Me Out of Here! ===
In November 2023, Farage appeared on the twenty-third series of the UK reality TV programme I'm a Celebrity...Get Me Out of Here!. The Independent reported that ITV offered Farage a fee of up to £1.5 million to take part, which would make him the highest paid contestant to date, in the history of the show. Farage finished in third place.

=== Fortune and Freedom ===
In 2020, Farage established a financial newsletter, Fortune and Freedom, which describes itself as "unregulated product published by Southbank Investment Research Limited". On 28 March 2021, Dutch Green Business announced Farage had been appointed to the firm's advisory board. The newsletter discusses issues related to pension investments.

=== Baxter Laois ===
In September 2022, Farage introduced a range of three gins made in Cornwall. By September 2025, the company selling it (Baxter Laois, owned by Laure Ferrari) was reportedly indebted with about £11,000 owing against assets of less than £1,000, and due to be struck off from the Companies House register. The petition to wind up the company was subsequently withdrawn.

=== Stay Free with Russell Brand ===
In November 2026, it emerged that Farage had appeared on Russell Brand's U.S. podcast as a guest in July 2024, nine months after police opened an investigation into the British actor and comedian, who is currently serving a 10-and-a-half year sentence for rape and sexual assault. Farage was aware of the allegations at the time, having reacted to them a year earlier on GB News. During the podcast, Farage joined Brand, conservative podcaster Dan Bongino, and Charlie Kirk. A spokesperson for Farage has said that he "regrets his appearance on the show. His thoughts are with the victims who have suffered immensely because of what Russell Brand has done".

== Political positions ==
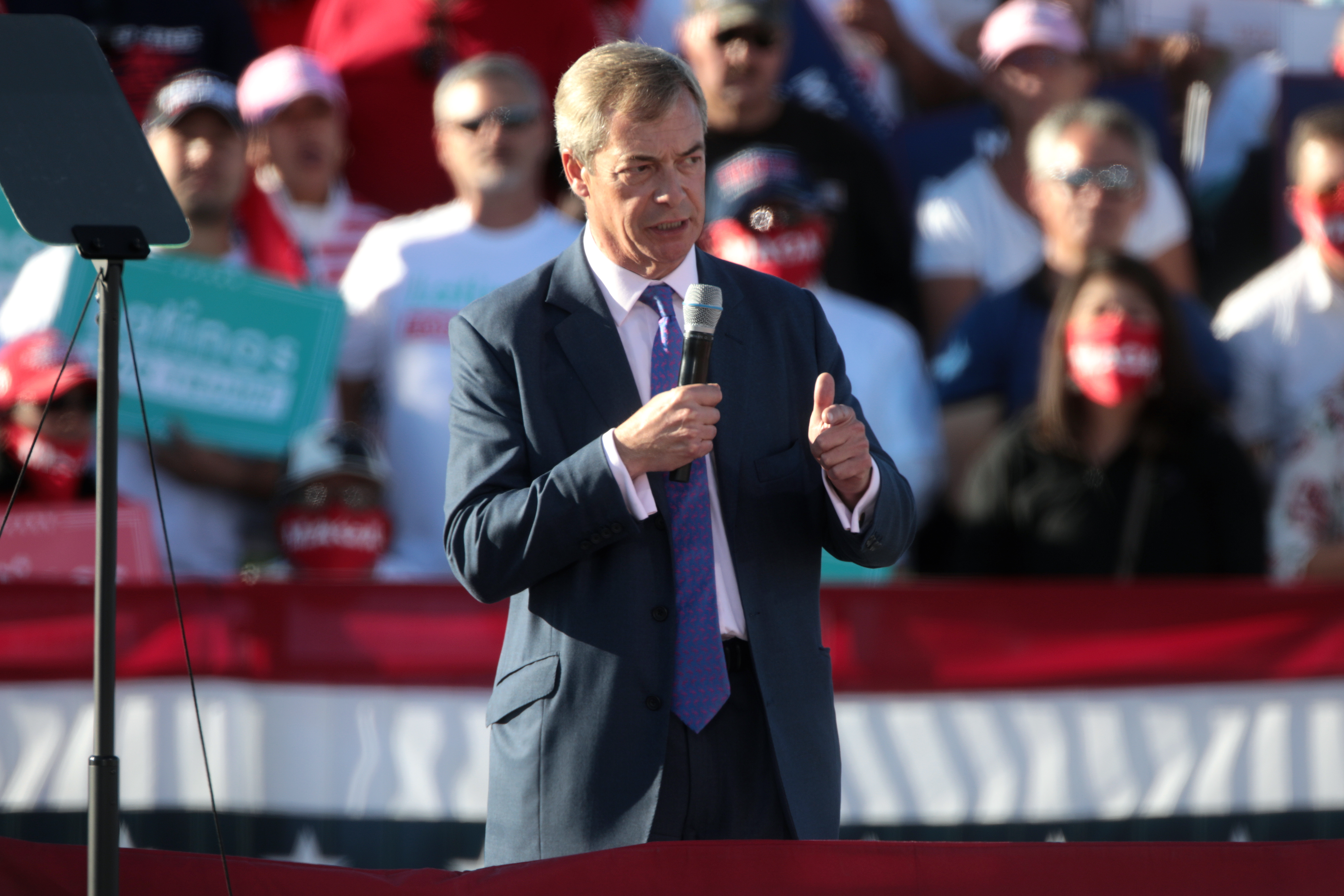
Farage speaking at a Trump rally in October 2020

Farage's personal views and his leadership of UKIP and Reform UK has been described as right-wing populist, Eurosceptic and anti-immigration by journalistic sources and news media.

Farage has been associated with euroscepticism throughout his political career and was described as "The face of Euroscepticism in the UK" by a BBC News profile in 2017. Farage was a member of the Conservative Party but left in protest of John Major's signing of the Maastricht Treaty in 1992. He has supported Britain's withdrawal from the European Union and has advocated for leaving the European Convention of Human Rights.

Farage has been associated with anti-immigration politics and consequently has been labelled as a far-right politician by the French newspaper Le Monde. Other political commentators and analysts, e.g. Stephen Daisley, have disputed the "far-right" label, while Farage himself has rejected it. In 2024, The Daily Telegraph referred to Farage and Reform UK as centre-right while The Independent political editor David Maddox has observed that Farage has adopted traditionally left-wing politics on certain economic issues since the 2020s alongside right-wing stances on national identity and immigration.

Farage feels that Britain has a "two tier culture where the rights and privileges of white people matter less than those of ethnic minorities". He suggested, in response to the murder of Henry Nowak, that two-tier policing resulted from anti-racism guidance.

In other areas, Farage has voiced scepticism about climate change. In foreign policy, he suggests NATO and EU expansion provoked Russia's invasion of Ukraine while expressing his personal dislike of Russian President Vladimir Putin. In American politics Farage is a supporter of Donald Trump.

Farage has expressed his displeasure with the terms under which abortions are allowed in the UK, saying "I am pro-choice, but I think it's ludicrous, utterly ludicrous, that we can allow abortion up to 24 weeks".

== Personal life ==
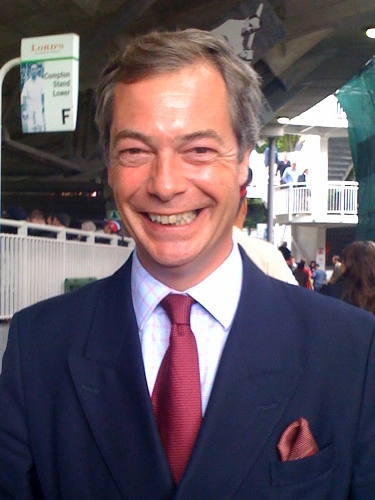
Farage attending the 2009 Ashes series at Lord's Cricket Ground

Between 2015 and 2017 Farage lived in Single Street, a hamlet in the London Borough of Bromley, "around the corner from his mother". As of May 2025, Farage owns several properties, including one worth around £1 million in Downe, two houses in Lydd-on-Sea, and a property in Tandridge. He said in November 2024 that he intended to live in Clacton-on-Sea, within his constituency, in a home that he said had been bought, for security reasons, in the name of his partner, Laure Ferrari.

He has been married twice. In 1988 he married Gráinne Hayes, an Irish nurse with whom he has two sons. They divorced in 1997. In 1999 he married Kirsten Mehr, a German national; the couple have two daughters. In April 2018 Farage said that the children have both British and German passports and that they speak "perfect German". He has made reference to his German wife in response to criticisms that he is "anti-Europe", while he himself says he is merely anti-EU. Farage employed his wife Kirsten as his parliamentary secretary and in April 2014 he said that "nobody else could do that job". In February 2017 his wife told the Press Association that they were living "separate lives" and that Farage had "moved out of the family home a while ago". In May 2017, he described himself as "53, separated, skint", citing 20 years of campaigning as the reason for both. In 2023 it was reported that Farage had been in a relationship with the French politician Laure Ferrari for several years. They first met in 2007 when Ferrari was working as a waitress.

On 25 November 1985, Farage was hit by a car after a night out, and suffered injury to his head and left leg, the latter nearly requiring amputation. He was in casts for 11 months, but recovered, and the nurse who treated him became his first wife. On 26 December 1986, Farage first felt symptoms of what was later discovered to be testicular cancer. He had the left testicle removed, and the cancer had not spread to any other organs.

Farage's memoir Fighting Bull (Flying Free in paperback) was published in 2010. It chronicles the founding of UKIP and his personal and political life. A second book, The Purple Revolution: The Year That Changed Everything, was released by Biteback Publishing in 2015.

Farage is a keen cricket fan and has appeared on Test Match Special. He appeared in an advertisement for the bookmaker Paddy Power ahead of golf's 2014 Ryder Cup. However, due to spinal injuries since his 2010 plane crash, he cannot play golf. Farage is also an association football fan, and supports Crystal Palace FC. He likes to relax by fishing alone at night on the Kent coast. Farage is a smoker and also fond of beer, this forming part of his public image. Farage was until 2021 a member of the East India Club, an exclusive private gentlemen's club in St. James's Square in London.

Farage is a Christian. In 2014 he described himself as a "somewhat lapsed" member of the Church of England. In 2011 he also said "You know, you can be Christian and fun or you can be Christian and, like Cromwell, be deeply puritanical and want to control everybody". During the early 2010s, he advocated for the defence of Christians and what he regards as "Christian values". In 2024, during a GB News interview, he stated that he is no longer attending the Church of England due to its "woke policies". In a 2025 Bloomberg podcast with Mishal Husain, he reiterated his membership in the Church of England but called the church "a catastrophe for the last 25 years". He added that if he were a regular church attendee, he would probably attend the Catholic Church.

In January 2016, Farage told The Mail on Sunday that he believed his car had been tampered with in October 2015, as he had been forced to stop when his car's wheel nuts came loose. He reported that he had spoken with the French police but did not wish to pursue the matter any further. The Times, however, said Farage's story was untrue, and that Dunkirk prosecutors had no reason to suspect foul play or the police would have started an investigation. The owner of the breakdown garage concerned had said the problem was probably shoddy repair work, but he had been unable to communicate directly with Farage. Farage later said he had made a "terrible, terrible mistake" in speaking to journalists and that a Sunday newspaper had misreported his claims of tampering as an assassination attempt.

In July 2026, Farage said he was "deeply, deeply upset" by the nature of Ann Widdecombe's death. On 7 August 2026, Counter-terrorism police (London) reopened an investigation into a 2025, burglary incident that occurred in April, at a Greater London property, with links to Farage and with potential links to the 2026 investigation into the death of Widdecombe. The IOPC confirmed on 7 August, that they had also opened an investigation into the alleged failure of an individual police staff member, to "follow a line of inquiry" relating to an alleged "lit incendiary device" that reportedly damaged Farage's front door in 2025.

In August 2024 it was revealed that Farage was earning in excess of £1 million a year from his employment outside parliament, in addition to his salary as an MP. The figure included earnings of nearly £1.2 million per year from his work presenting on the GB News television channel. The disclosures were made in the latest Register of Members' Financial Interests (external) published by parliament. In the same month, Farage reported in the Register of Members' Financial Interests that he had earned over a million pounds per year for work done outside parliament since he became an MP, an amount thought to be "significantly higher than that of any other member of parliament".

The Guardian reported that in the time from Farage being elected as an MP in July 2024 to May 2025, he went abroad at least nine times and went on holiday to France while Parliament was sitting in May 2025. During the same timeframe, over 800 hours of his employment had been on work outside being an MP.

=== Coutts account ===
In June 2023, Farage said that his account with the private bank Coutts was to be closed. He was offered a standard bank account by Coutts's parent group, NatWest, in the closure notice he received. Farage said he was then refused personal and business accounts at seven other UK banks. When pressed by Farage to reveal why, NatWest said that he no longer met the Coutts eligibility criteria as his account balance had dropped below £1 m following the expiry of his mortgage.

The story was picked up by the UK press. It was later revealed that Farage's account had been closed partly because Coutts felt that his beliefs and values did not align with theirs. In an internal dossier, Coutts wrote that he "is at best seen as xenophobic and pandering to racists" and considered a "disingenuous grifter".

In a front-page story on 20 July, The Daily Telegraph reported that the Coutts CEO, Dame Alison Rose, had dined with Simon Jack, the business editor for BBC News, on the evening before he published an article saying that the decision had been "for commercial reasons". Peter Bone MP and David Jones MP were reported as calling for Rose to resign.

In October 2023, it was reported that the ICO ruled that Rose had twice violated the law, as it upheld two parts of Farage's complaint concerning the treatment of his personal data; but the ICO later withdrew the comment about Rose, and apologised to her, saying that their ruling related only to NatWest. In the same month, an investigation by lawyers Travers Smith, appointed by NatWest, found that the bank had acted in a "lawful" manner when it closed Farage's account, but had "failed to treat him fairly". The Financial Conduct Authority said that the report by Travers Smith revealed "potential regulatory breaches" by the bank. Farage described the Travers Smith report as a "whitewash".

== In popular culture ==
The actor Kevin Bishop portrayed Farage in the 2016 mockumentary Nigel Farage Gets His Life Back on BBC Two.

Farage is portrayed by Paul Ryan in the 2019 film Brexit: The Uncivil War.

In 2026 Farage was portrayed by Peter Serafinowicz in a cold open sketch on the inaugural series of Saturday Night Live UK.

== Bibliography ==
- Fighting Bull. Biteback (autobiography 2010 hardback first edition). ISBN 978-1-84954-039-1.
- Flying Free. Biteback (autobiography 2011 paperback second edition). ISBN 978-1-84954-094-0.
- The Purple Revolution: The Year That Changed Everything. Biteback (memoir 2015 paperback). ISBN 978-1-84954-863-2.

== See also ==
- Electoral history of Nigel Farage
- The Farage Garage, a nickname given to the Customs clearance facility and lorry park near Sevington, Kent, near Dover

== Notes ==
Party political offices
Preceded by Alan Sked	Chair of the UK Independence Party; 1998–2000	Succeeded by Mike Nattrass
Preceded by Roger Knapman	Leader of the UK Independence Party; 2006–2009	Succeeded by The Lord Pearson of Rannoch
New party group	Chair of Europe of Freedom and Democracy; 2009–2014	Party group abolished
Preceded by Jeffrey Titford; Acting	Leader of the UK Independence Party; 2010–2016	Succeeded by Diane James
New party group	Chair of Europe of Freedom and Direct Democracy; 2014–2019	Party group abolished
Preceded by Diane James	Leader of the UK Independence Party; Acting; 2016	Succeeded by Paul Nuttall
Preceded by Catherine Blaiklock	Leader of the Brexit Party; 2019–2021	Succeeded by Richard Tice
Preceded by Richard Tice	Leader of Reform UK; 2024–present	Incumbent
European Parliament
New constituency	Member of the European Parliament for South East England; 1999–2020	Constituency abolished
Parliament of the United Kingdom
Preceded by Giles Watling	Member of Parliament for Clacton; 2024–present	Incumbent
