= Michiel van Hulten =

Former Dutch politician

Michiel Frans van Hulten
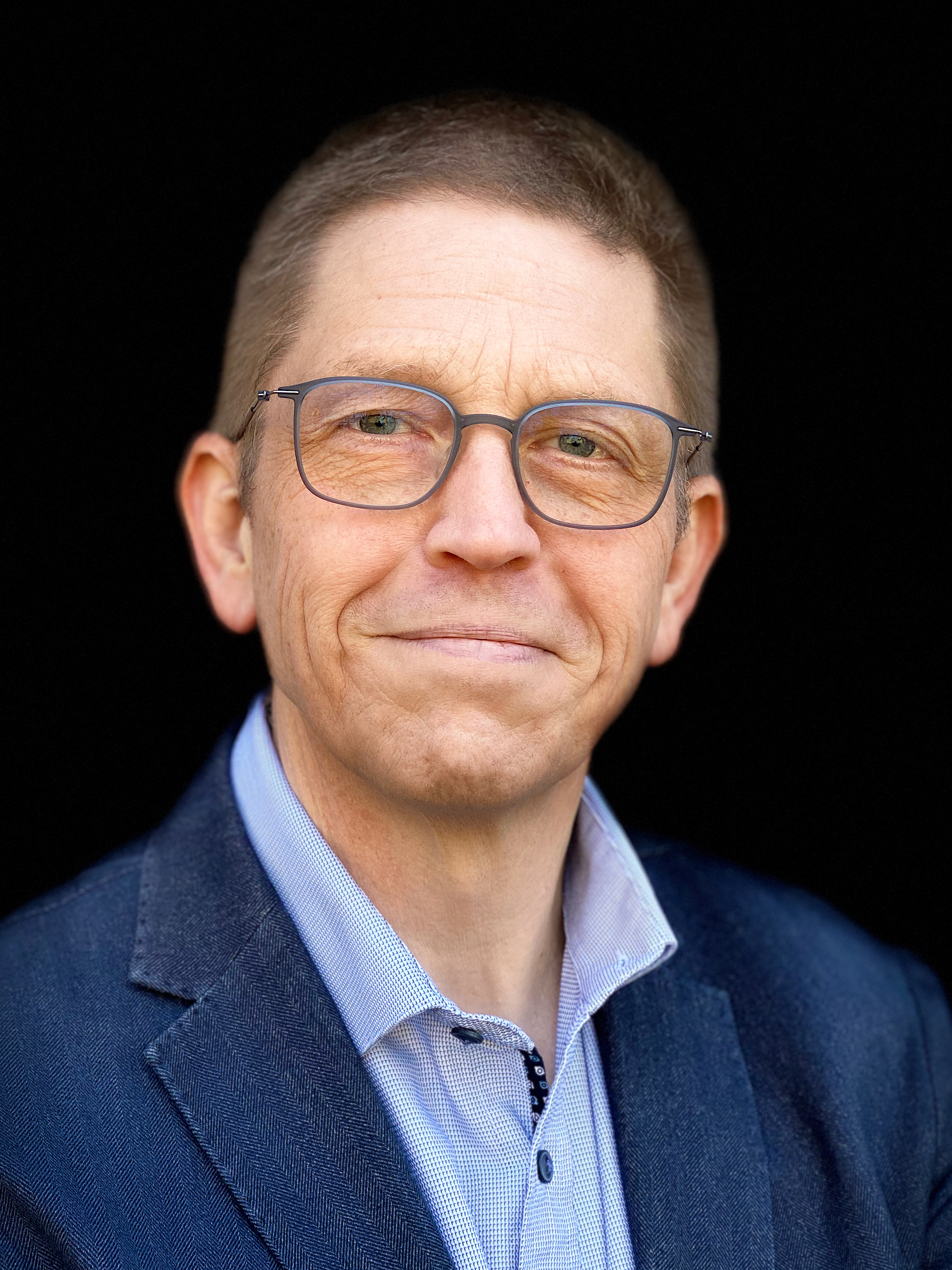
- Born: February 18, 1969 (age 57)
- Education: London School of Economics and Political Science, College of Europe
- Occupations: Director of Transparency International EU, former politician
- Known for: Member of the European Parliament, former chairman of the Labour Party

Michiel Frans van Hulten (born 18 February 1969) is a director of strategic research. He is a former director of Transparency International EU and a former Dutch politician. He was a Member of the European Parliament (1999–2004) and was chairman of the Labour Party (Dutch: Partij van de Arbeid, PvdA) from December 2005 until April 2007.

== Early years ==
Michiel van Hulten is the son of former Member of Parliament, Senator and former undersecretary to the Minister of Transport Michel van Hulten and former local alderwoman and provincial councillor Els van Hulten-Delfgaauw. He spent much of his youth abroad. In addition to the Netherlands, he lived in Mali, Burkina Faso, the United States and the United Kingdom. Van Hulten earned the International Baccalaureate at Atlantic College (part of the United World Colleges group of schools) in Wales. He holds a BSc(Econ) in Government (1990) and a MSc in Public Administration and Public Policy (1991) from the London School of Economics and Political Science (LSE), and a Master of Arts in European Political and Administrative Studies (1993) from the College of Europe in Bruges. During his university years, he became a member of the Dutch Labour Party and the Young Socialists.

== Political career ==
=== Reaching the European Parliament ===
Van Hulten began his career in 1993 as a policy officer at the Dutch Trades Union Confederation (Dutch: Federatie Nederlandse Vakbeweging, FNV) in Amsterdam. He was then successively private secretary (political advisor) to Education and Science Minister Jo Ritzen and administrator in the Secretariat of the EU Council of Ministers, where he worked first on internal market issues and then on EU enlargement. In 1997, Van Hulten took part in the election campaign for Tony Blair in the UK, and in 1998 he worked for the Labour Party campaign in the parliamentary elections in the Netherlands, as speechwriter for party leader Wim Kok.

In 1999, Van Hulten was a successful Labour Party candidate in the European Parliament elections. He was a member of the Committee on Budgetary Control, which is tasked with reducing EU budgetary fraud and irregularities. Together with colleagues from other countries and parties he founded the Campaign for Parliament Reform, a group of MEPs which campaigned for an end the monthly 'travelling circus' of Parliament between Brussels and Strasbourg and greater accountability for the reimbursements of parliamentary expenses. In 2002, Van Hulten was named one the Europeans of the Year by the weekly newspaper European Voice.

=== Party chairman ===
He decided not to seek re-election in 2004 and joined the board of Policy Network, an international progressive think-tank based in London. From 2004 to 2005, he was executive vice-chair of Policy Network. After PvdA chairman Ruud Koole announced in 2005, he was stepping down, Van Hulten ran for the chairmanship of the Labour Party and won with over 60% of the vote.

Van Hulten was campaign chairman for the Labour Party in the successful local elections in 2006 as well as in the parliamentary elections of 2006, when the Labour Party unexpectedly lost 9 seats. In the months following the elections, he was sometimes criticised for his idiosyncratic style. After Van Hulten presented a set of reform proposals to the party executive in April 2007, three board members informed him via a letter that they disagreed with his views. Van Hulten saw this as a breach of trust and resigned with immediate effect on 25 April 2007. The same evening, the rest of the board also resigned, and an interim board was appointed under the leadership of Van Hultens predecessor Ruud Koole.

=== After electoral politics ===
From 2007 to 2012, van Hulten was a founding Member of the European Council on Foreign Relations. Since 2007, Van Hulten has worked in Brussels, first for public affairs firm Burson-Marsteller as managing director for government relations. Since 2010, he has been an independent consultant in the field of European Union democracy, transparency and accountability. In 2011, he founded his own consulting firm Place Lux, which focuses on non-profit work. From 2011 to 2013 he was course leader of the FutureLab Europe programme at the European Policy Centre. From 2011 to 2013, he was a guest lecturer on the European Parliament for the European journalism master's programme at the Institut des Hautes Etudes des Communications Sociales in Brussels. From 2011 to 2014, he was managing director of VoteWatch Europe, an organisation that tracks the voting records of the European Parliament and the Council of Ministers.

From 2014 to 2017, Van Hulten was a visiting senior fellow at the European Institute of the London School of Economics and Political Science.

In 2017, Van Hulten co-founded BOLDT, a communications agency. He left BOLDT in 2019 when he was appointed Director of Transparency International EU, the Brussels office of the global movement against corruption. From 2013 to 2019, he was a supervisory board member at Defend Democracy, an independent, nonpartisan and transatlantic organisation whose mission is to defend and strengthen liberal democracy against internal, external and technological threats.

In 2023, Van Hulten was part of the Centre for European Policy Studies/Heinrich Böll Foundation High-Level Group on Bolstering EU Democracy, chaired by Kalypso Nicolaïdis. That same year, he took a one-year sabbatical to pursue a postgraduate certificate in international investigative journalism at Thomas More University of Applied Sciences in Mechelen, Belgium. He left Transparency International EU in July 2024 and now works as an analyst, writer, teacher and consultant. In June 2024, he joined the Board of the media literacy NGO Lie Detectors.

In 2017, 2018, 2019 and 2020, Van Hulten was named one of the top 40 EU influencers on Twitter.

Party political offices
Preceded by Ruud Koole	Chairman of the Labour Party; 2005–2007	Succeeded by Lilianne Ploumen
