= Laure Ferrari =

French politician (born 1979)

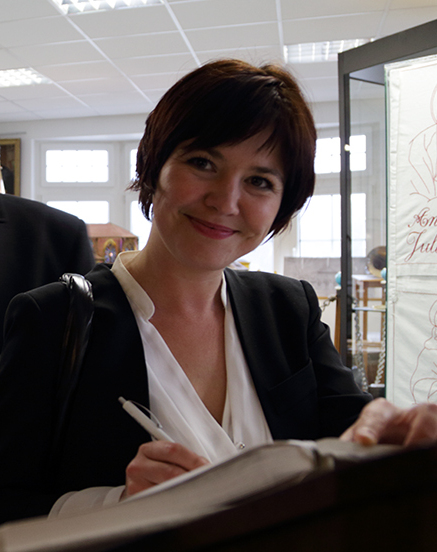
- Ferrari in 2014
- Born: October 1979 (age 46–47); Épinal, France
- Education: University of Strasbourg
- Occupation: Politician
- Political party: Debout la France (formerly)
- Other political affiliations: UK Independence Party; Reform UK
- Partner: Nigel Farage

Laure Ferrari (French pronunciation: [lɔʁ fɛʁaʁi]; born October 1979) is a French politician who has worked for several right-wing political organisations and parties, including the French nationalist party Debout la France (DLF).

Ferrari was head of the Institute for Direct Democracy in Europe (IDDE), a Eurosceptic think tank. Ferrari was also founding member of The Movement, together with Mischaël Modrikamen and his wife Yasmine Dehaene-Modrikamen, which in 2018 was joined and promoted by Steve Bannon.

Ferrari is the partner of Nigel Farage, Reform UK leader and MP.

== Career ==
Laure Ferrari was born in Épinal. She studied English at the University of Strasbourg. Ferrari stated her interest in politics began with the 2005 French European Constitution referendum. She made acquaintance with then leader of UKIP Nigel Farage 2007 in Strasbourg, while working as a waitress, which led her to start a political career. Farage firstly gave her a job as a parliamentary assistant in charge of environmental issues. Subsequently, she was made director of public relations for the British delegation of the Europe of Freedom and Democracy (EFD) parliamentary group (2009–2014), which later became the Europe of Freedom and Direct Democracy (EFDD) group.

The EFD/EFDD was at the time co-chaired by Nigel Farage and Francesco Speroni. In this context she met Nicolas Dupont-Aignan, leader of the far-right Eurosceptic French party "France Arise" (Debout la France), itself a member of the Alliance for Direct Democracy in Europe (ADDE), founded by UKIP. For Debout la France, she first worked as a departmental secretary in Bas-Rhin and then as a European affairs delegate in the party's national office. She stood as a candidate for the party at the 2014 European Parliament election in France, but was unsuccessful.

She did not run for a second term, but instead focused on her new role as head of the Institute for Direct Democracy in Europe (IDDE), a Eurosceptic think tank, which was accused in 2017 of having illegally diverted public money for the benefit of UKIP. The party was under investigation for having received over £400,000 in donations from the think tank prior to the UK General Election and the Brexit referendum. The UK's Electoral Commission found UKIP had complied with the UK's political-finance rules.

In January 2017, she was founding member of The Mouvement / Le Mouvement together with Mischaël Modrikamen and his wife Yasmine Dehaene-Modrikamen. Although Modrikamen had envisioned the Movement to become an alliance of populist proponents in Europe and abroad, the project did not catch attention until July 2018 when Steve Bannon declared to work on a European alliance of far-right forces.

== Personal life ==
Ferrari is the long-term partner of Nigel Farage, leader of Reform UK, formerly known as the Brexit Party, and former leader of UKIP. Ferrari first met Farage in 2007 when she was working in Strasbourg as a waitress. Ferrari worked for Farage as his EU parliamentary aide and in 2017 stayed at his home in London. Ferrari travelled to Queensland in Australia to greet Farage on his exit from the 23rd series of I'm A Celebrity...Get Me Out of Here! in 2023, when he finished third in the public vote.

Ferrari bought a detached property in Clacton which was initially reported in the media that they shared and jointly owned. After further investigation this was found to be false. Farage said he misspoke when questioned by journalists about the purchase.
