= Hultén =

Hultén is a Swedish surname. Notable people with the surname include:

- Agnes Hultén (born 1973), Swedish politician
- Eric Hultén (1894–1981), Swedish botanist
- Fredrik Hultén (1966–1997), Swedish rower
- Jens Hultén (born 1963), Swedish actor
- Pontus Hultén (1924–2006), Swedish art collector and museum director
- Vivi-Anne Hultén (1911–2003), Swedish figure skater

== See also ==
- Van Hulten
