= Michel van Hulten =

Dutch politician (1930–2025)

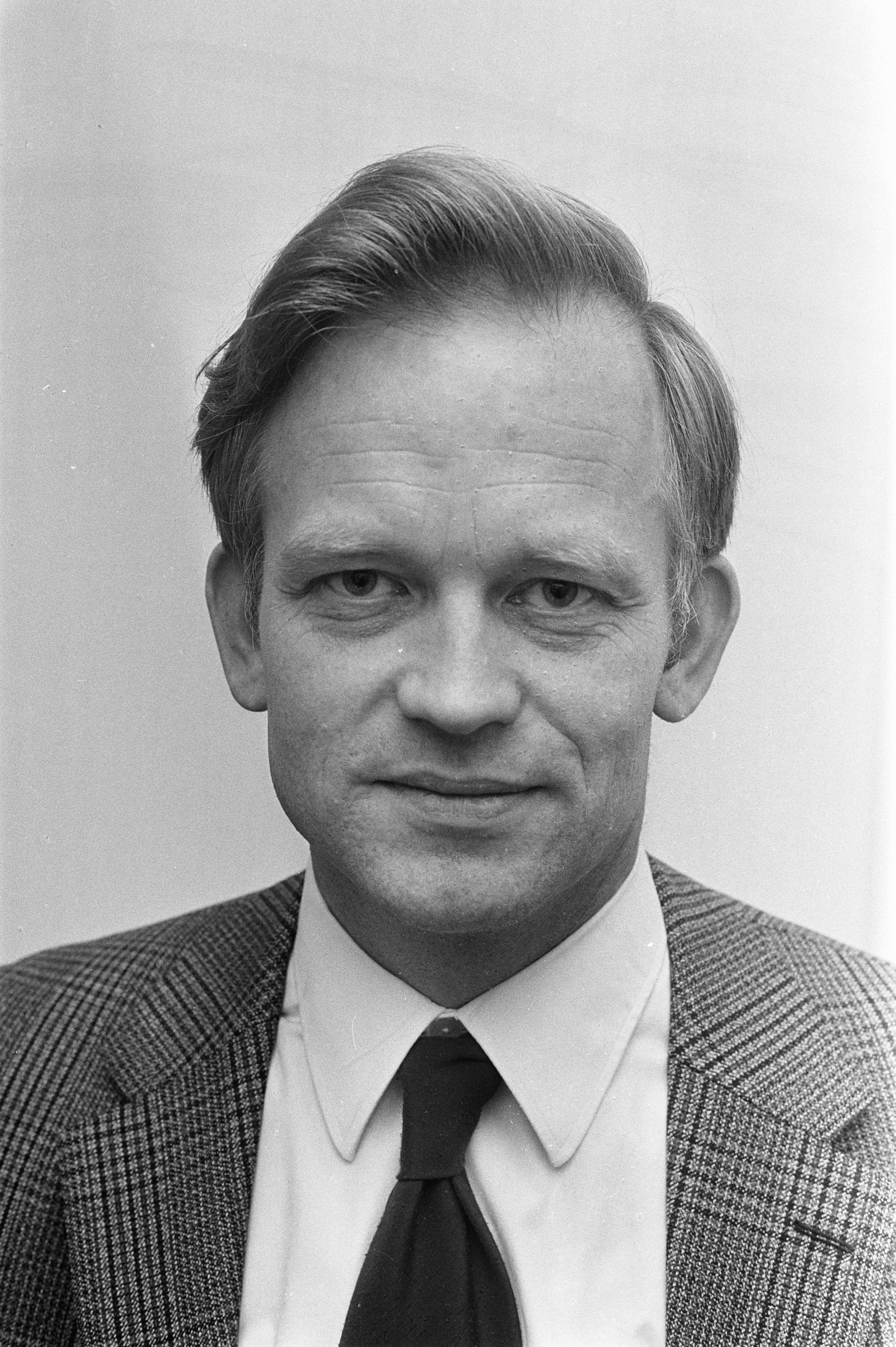
- Van Hulten in 1972

State Secretary for Transport and Water Management
- In office 11 May 1973 – 19 December 1977
- Prime Minister: Joop den Uyl
- Preceded by: Roelof Kruisinga
- Succeeded by: Neelie Kroes

Member of the House of Representatives
- In office 8 June 1977 – 8 September 1977
- In office 7 December 1972 – 11 May 1973
- Parliamentary group: Political Party of Radicals

Member of the Senate
- In office 25 May 1971 – 7 December 1972
- Parliamentary group: Political Party of Radicals

Personal details
- Born: Michael Henricus Maria van Hulten; 9 March 1930 Salemba, Batavia, Dutch East Indies
- Died: 1 December 2025 (aged 95) Eindhoven, Netherlands
- Party: Political Party of Radicals (1968–1981)
- Other political affiliations: See list: Catholic People's Party (until 1968) Independent (1981–1991) Democrats 66 (1991–1998) Independent (1998–2000) GroenLinks (2000–2005) Labour Party (2005–2010) 50Plus (2010–2013) Ikkiesvooreerlijk.eu (2014–2019)
- Spouse: Els Delfgaauw (m. 1966; died 2019)
- Children: Michiel van Hulten Wouter van Hulten; Saskia van Hulten-Oepts Like van Hulten
- Education: University of Amsterdam (PhD)
- Occupation: Politician; Diplomat; Nonprofit director; Urban planner; Social geographer

Michael Henricus Maria "Michel" van Hulten (9 March 1930 – 1 December 2025) was a Dutch politician. As a member of the Political Party of Radicals (PPR) he was a member of the Dutch parliament and he was the undersecretary of the Minister of Transport in Joop den Uyl's cabinet.

== Life and career ==
Van Hulten was born in Batavia, and was trained as a human geographer and urban planner. He earned his PhD (Amsterdam University, 1962) with a thesis on Collectivization of Agriculture in the Polish People’s Republic, 1944–1960.

He was a member of the Dutch parliament Senate for the PPR. Eighteen months later he moved to the House. In May 1973, he took office as the undersecretary of the Minister of Transport, under premier Den Uyl. In this role in 1974, he introduced legislation implementing use of the tachograph to better control truck driving and mandatory driver rest periods.

Van Hulten was a member of the Godebald-groep in the PPR and was in favor of cooperation of the PPR with the PvdA and D66 instead of cooperation with the Communist Party of the Netherlands. Van Hulten left the PPR in 1981.

Over the course of his political career, he has been a member of KVP, PPR, D66, GroenLinks and PvdA.

From 1978 to 1996, he was employed by NGOs, the United Nations and the Dutch Government working in Mali, Burkina Faso, Djibouti, Malaysia, New York, Washington and The Hague. van Hulten was a researcher specializing on corruption and integrity in the New York Headquarters of UNDP in 1984–1986.

He was Professor Governance (2007–2015) at SAXION University of Applied Sciences, School of Governance, Law and Urban Development. He worked for the World Bank (Global Coalition for Africa (1991–1996) and with NGOs with an anti-corruption focus, among others in Slovenia 2000–2002.

The parliamentary elections in 1994, he was a candidate on behalf of D66, but he was not elected. In 1994–98, he was chairman of the program committee of D66.

Despite retirement, Van Hulten remained active in public debate, as an enthusiastic advocate for free public transport in the Netherlands. He published regularly in the e-magazine www.civismundi.nl.

Michel van Hulten was the father of Michiel van Hulten, Member of the European Parliament (1999–2004) who was the leader of the Labour Party (Dutch: Partij van de Arbeid) PvdA from December 2005 to April 2007.

Van Hulten died of prostate cancer on 1 December 2025, at the age of 95.
