= Den Uyl =

den Uyl, a Dutch surname (in modern Dutch spelling rendered den Uijl), may refer to:

- Bob den Uyl (1930–1992), Dutch writer
- Jan den Uyl (1595/1596-1640), Dutch painter
- Joop den Uyl (1919–1987), Dutch politician and prime minister
- Douglas Den Uyl (1950–present), American philosopher
