= The Purple Revolution: The Year That Changed Everything =

Book by Nigel Farage

- Author: Nigel Farage
- Language: English
- Subject: Politics, autobiography
- Publisher: Biteback Publishing
- Publication date: March 2015
- Publication place: United Kingdom
- Media type: Print (paperback), e-book
- Pages: 320
- ISBN: 978-1-84-954863-2 (paperback)
- Preceded by: Fighting Bull

The Purple Revolution: The Year That Changed Everything is a political memoir by Nigel Farage, then-leader of the UK Independence Party (UKIP). It is published by Biteback Publishing, and released on 17 March 2015.

== Content ==
Near the start of the book, Farage declares that he rarely scripts or practises his speeches, and how he does not regret any of them, saying "The more risk you take, the more likely it is that things will go really well, or really badly".

In one chapter, Farage writes of his being hit by a car in 1985, his suffering from testicular cancer the year after, and his plane crash while campaigning in the 2010 general election. He uses these three near-death experiences to state his opinions on the National Health Service, saying that he has seen "the best and worst" of it.

Farage declares his support for Rand Paul, whom he calls his "political Doppelgänger". He also praises the late trade union leader Bob Crow, who he claims was the only trade unionist who did not support big government and mass immigration.

He also goes on to allege that the Conservative Party is intercepting communications by UKIP politicians. Farage stated in the book that if not elected as MP for South Thanet in the 2015 general election, he would quit as UKIP leader. The book ends by saying "So over to you, dear voter. It is all down to you now".

== Reception ==
The Western Gazette noted that as the book had sold out on pre-orders, "despite divided public opinion, plenty of people are keen to hear what the controversial politician has to say".

Writing for The Guardian, Nick Cohen said that the book revealed "a small-minded man living in a bubble of self-aggrandisement". He pointed out that Farage regularly pointed out individuals' ethnicity or nationality in a variety of situations, including surgeons and bar staff. In his opinion, Farage had "relentless" self-pity, exemplified by his claim that he could have become wealthier had he stayed in commodity trading rather than entering politics. However, he pointed out that left-wing criticism of Farage and UKIP was becoming counter-productive, with too-frequent accusations of prejudice leading to the left being seen as having a "hectoring and joyless culture".

The Independent's John Rentoul criticised how Farage spelt the word "Revolution" with the word "Love" reversed, likening it to the "mindless anti-politics" of anti-voting activist Russell Brand, who had also used it on his own book. He was not impressed by Farage saying that he had not changed his political views since leaving Dulwich College in 1982, "not something of which a self-aware person would be proud". Rentoul however stated that he supports Farage's Euroscepticism from a left-wing perspective, and saw it as a reason why UKIP were gaining support in Labour-dominated areas.

Ann Treneman of the New Statesman criticised how Farage made his statements on the National Health Service off his own personal experiences. She said that the book "would be an absolute hoot, if only it were parody".
