= VoteWatch Europe =

NGO based in Brussels, Belgium

Logo of VoteWatch Europe in 2022.

VoteWatch Europe was an independent NGO based in Brussels. VoteWatch compiled voting behaviours of Members of the European Parliament and presented them in graphical and statistical form.

VoteWatch ran as a scientific project under the direction of Sarah Hagemann from 2008 until June 2022. In 2009 it was transformed into an NGO by Simon Hix and Doru Frantescu.
