= Hashi Mohamed =

British barrister (born 1983)

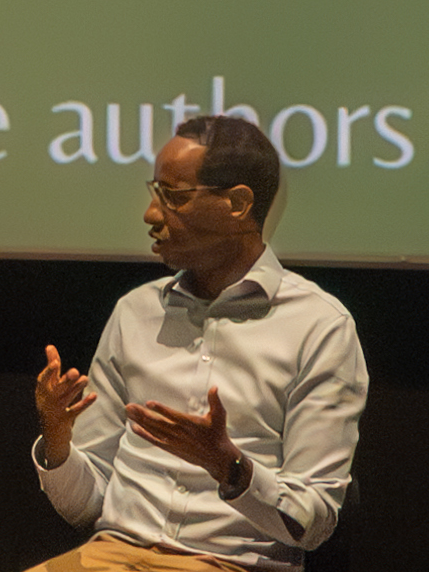
- Mohamed speaking at the 2024 Chiswick Book Festival
- Born: 1982 or 1983 (age 42–43); Nairobi, Kenya
- Education: University of Hertfordshire; St Anthony's College, Oxford
- Occupations: Barrister; Journalist; Author

Hashi Mohamed (English pronunciation: /'hæ.ʃi: mə'hæ.mɪd/; born September 1983) is a British barrister and journalist. A member of Lincoln's Inn since 2010, he is also an author of two books, and has written for publications including The Guardian, The Times, and The Financial Times. He currently works for Landmark Chambers, as well as acting as the Chair of Coin Street's Secondary Housing Co-operative Housing Association since 2023.

Born in Kenya, Mohamed came to the United Kingdom as a refugee child. He studied at the University of Hertfordshire and the University of Oxford, before gaining his first position at No5 Chambers. His career as a journalist and broadcaster has included documentaries on BBC Radio 4, and writing for a variety of print publications. He often authors op-eds on social mobility and the housing crisis. He has written two books on these themes: People Like Us (2020) and A Home of One's Own (2022).

== Early life and education ==
Born in 1982 or 1983 in Nairobi, Kenya, Mohamed grew up as part of a Somali family. His paternal grandfather, also called Hashi, was a rural goat farmer in Italian Somaliland. His mother had twelve children, of which six were from a previous marriage. His father was a salesman and died in a car accident in 1993. Mohamed, who was only nine at the time, was sent to the United Kingdom unaccompanied as a refugee as a result. When he arrived in the United Kingdom, he knew only basic English and nothing about British customs. He lived with his aunt and in low-rent housing before he was reunited with his mother, and he recalls moving house every year for a decade. He was raised on state benefits, and was also homeless for part of his childhood.

Mohamed has described his upbringing as "remarkably unremarkable" due to the large number of people who share the social situation he found himself in as a child. Mohamed studied at Wembley High School, a comprehensive school in north London. At the age of 18, he gained British citizenship, which allowed him to be able to return to Kenya. There, he concluded that he would have greater opportunities in the United Kingdom.

After leaving school, Mohamed studied Law and French at the University of Hertfordshire. He then won a full postgraduate scholarship to St Antony's College at the University of Oxford, before gaining a position at No5 Chambers. Although he experienced the benefits of social mobility as a child, he does not believe his experiences were typical, and that a child in his position today would be unable to do so.

== Career ==
=== Barrister ===
Having completed law school in early 2010, Mohamed became a member of the Honourable Society of Lincoln's Inn when he was called to the bar on 31 July 2010, a position available to him for his entire lifetime. The society is one of London's four Inns of Court to which all barristers must belong to be able to practise. He completed his training as a barrister in London in 2012; he is still active in this career today, practising in London and specialising in planning and environment law. In July 2023, Mohamed started working for Landmark Chambers, joining their groups on planning and the environment.

Mohamed admits in People Like Us that he often takes a 'tough love' approach in his work, such as sending home an intern for arriving only four minutes late and without pen or paper, and says that people must either "evolve or die". In April 2023, Mohamed became the Chair of Coin Street's Secondary Housing Co-operative Housing Association, which focusses on housing and maintenance within the South Bank. In March 2023, Mohamed submitted written evidence to the UK Parliament's Select Committee detailing his professional views on the causes of the UK housing crisis.

=== Journalist ===
On BBC Radio 4, Mohamed has presented several documentaries including Adventures in Social Mobility in 2017 and one on the murder of Stephen Lawrence in 2013. In February 2022, he presented an episode of the BBC Radio 4 programme Analysis titled "Planning, Housing and Politics" where he discussed the causes and impact of the housing crisis, as well as how to fix it. He has contributed to publications including Prospect, The Guardian, The Times and the Financial Times. His main focus in his career as a journalist is the issue of social mobility, which he has called "society's most intractable problem". He has also written about the housing crisis and its impact on people's opportunities.

=== Author ===
In January 2020, Mohamed published his first book titled People Like Us via Profile Books, which is an attempt to rethink the concept of social mobility in modern Britain. In an interview, Mohamed said that the book was partly inspired by his 2017 documentary Adventures in Social Mobility, but also by his own background as a refugee. The book was chosen as "Book of the Year" by Elif Shafak in the New Statesman, where it was described as "a brilliant book that should be read and celebrated at any time". The Standard referred to the book as a "victory over adversity". People Like Us also featured in BBC Radio 4's series Book of the Week, with Mohamed reading five extracts from his book on 19–23 October 2020.

Mohamed published his second book, A Home of One's Own, in September 2022. The book is about the housing crisis in the United Kingdom from the perspective of both his personal and professional experiences. As of September 2024, Mohamed was working on a children's book about the safety and security of the home, based on his own children's interests and experiences.

== Views ==
Mohamed has criticised countries that welcome refugees without investing in supporting them. In May 2023, Mohamed appeared on Question Time, where he criticised Conservative MP Kieran Mullan's support for the government's Rwanda asylum plan; he received widespread acclaim for his response to the policy as "not helping anyone". He also encouraged the government to repeal the two-child benefit cap in September 2024, saying that it has had a "devastating impact on children".

Mohamed has criticised businesses who hire using a diversity, equity, and inclusion framework, while not genuinely evaluating their suitability for the job. He has argued that employers should hire people based on "potential rather than polish". However, he has also advised people to change their native accents in professional situations to come across more intelligent, encouraging people not to end up "dying a martyr for a class war". In response to the election of Rishi Sunak as Prime Minister of the United Kingdom, Mohamed disagreed that it was a victory for progressivism because of Sunak's multimillionaire background. Mohamed sees as ironic that policies of Sunak's Conservative Party would not welcome his family's immigrant background.

In Mohamed's campaign for greater social mobility, he says that the idea that "if you work hard you will get on" is a myth in modern British society, and that top professions are often actually catered to people from privileged backgrounds. He has criticised the media attention around rare cases of social mobility as a distraction from its failure to exist in the majority of cases. Mohamed also believes in building more houses to solve the UK housing crisis and believes that it is a key factor in the lack of social mobility, and that the UK's planning system and green belt are partially to blame for this. He has also suggested reforms to make it easier for people to downsize their houses.

== Bibliography ==
- People Like Us: What it Takes to Make it in Modern Britain. Profile Books. 2020. ISBN 978-1-78816-111-4.
- A Home of One's Own: Why the Housing Crisis Matters & What Needs to Change. Profile Books. 2022. ISBN 978-1-80081-127-0.

== See also ==
- Lee Elliot Major
- Peter Saunders
- Stephen Machin
