= Hashi =

Hashi may refer to:

- The Japanese name for chopsticks
- Hashiwokakero, Japanese logic puzzle
- Hashi Station, railway station in Gōtsu, Shimane Prefecture, Japan
- HashiCorp, open-source software company based in San Francisco, California

== People ==
=== Somali ===
- Mohamed Hashi Abdi, Somali politician
- Abdi Hashi Abdullahi, Somali politician
- Omar Hashi Aden, Somali politician
- Mohamed Hashi Elmi, Somali politician
- Mohammed Hashi Gani, Somali military official
- Mohamed Hashi Lihle, Somali military leader
- Abdirahman Mohamed Abdi Hashi, Somali politician
- Abdulkadir Abdi Hashi, Somali politician
- Ali Matan Hashi, Somali senior military official and politician
- Mohamed Abdi Hashi (1998–2004), Somali politician
- Mohamed Hashi (died 2020), Somali politician

=== Somaliland ===
- Mohamoud Hashi Abdi, Somaliland politician
- Osman Awad Hashi, Somaliland chief of staff

=== Japanese ===
- Makoto Hashi (born 1977), Japanese professional wrestler
- Takaya Hashi (1952–2025), Japanese voice actor
- Takayo Hashi (born 1977), Japanese female mixed martial artist
- Yoshi-Hashi, (born 1982), Japanese professional wrestler
- Yukio Hashi (1943–2025), Japanese Enka singer and actor

=== Other nationalities ===
- Hashi Mohamed (born 1983), British barrister
- Kemal Hashi Mohamoud, Ethiopian politician
- Samira Hashi (born 1991), Somali-British model, social activist and community worker
- Shō Hashi (1371–1439, r. 1422–1439), the last king of Chūzan and the first king of the Ryūkyū Kingdom (today Okinawa Prefecture, Japan)

== See also ==
- Hachi (disambiguation)
