= Hachi =

Hachi may refer to:

== People ==
- Kenshi Yonezu (born 1991), known by the stage name Hachi (ハチ)
- Waberi Hachi (born 1981), Djiboutian soccer player
- Hachi (はち), member of the visual kei band Dolly
- Hachi Hülüg, member of the Genghis Khan family tree

== Fictional characters ==
Hachi is a common nickname in Japanese.

- Hachi, the nickname for Hachigen Ushōda, a character in the manga Bleach
- Hachi, a dog in the manga Fighting Spirit
- Hachi, the nickname of Nana Komatsu, one of the main characters from the manga Nana
- Hachi, the nickname of Hatchan, a character from the manga One Piece
- Hachi, a nickname of Hachirota "Hachimaki" Hoshino, the main character of the manga Planetes
- Hachi, the pet dog of the Isasaka family in the comic strip Sazae-san
- Hachi, name of a cat in The Travelling Cat Chronicles by Hiro Arikawa

== Places ==
- Hachi Darreh, a village in northwestern Iran

== Other uses ==
- Hachi, overlapping plates in a kabuto helmet
- Hachi: A Dog's Tale, a 2009 drama film

== See also ==
- Ellychnia hatchi
- Hachikō, a Japanese Akita dog, subject of Hachi: A Dog's Tale
- Harpalus hatchi
- Honeybee Hutch, named Hatchi in the original Japanese version
- Kevin Hatchi (born 1981), French footballer
