= Waberi =

Waberi may refer to:

- Waberi District, district in Banaadir, Somalia

== People with the given name ==
- Waberi Hachi (born 1981), Djiboutian footballer

== People with the surname ==
- Abdirizak Waberi (born 1966), Somali-Swedish politician
- Abdourahman Waberi (born 1965), Djiboutian writer
- Omar Ismail Waberi, Somali politician
