= Emma Edhem =

English politician (born 1966)

Alderman Emma Edhem
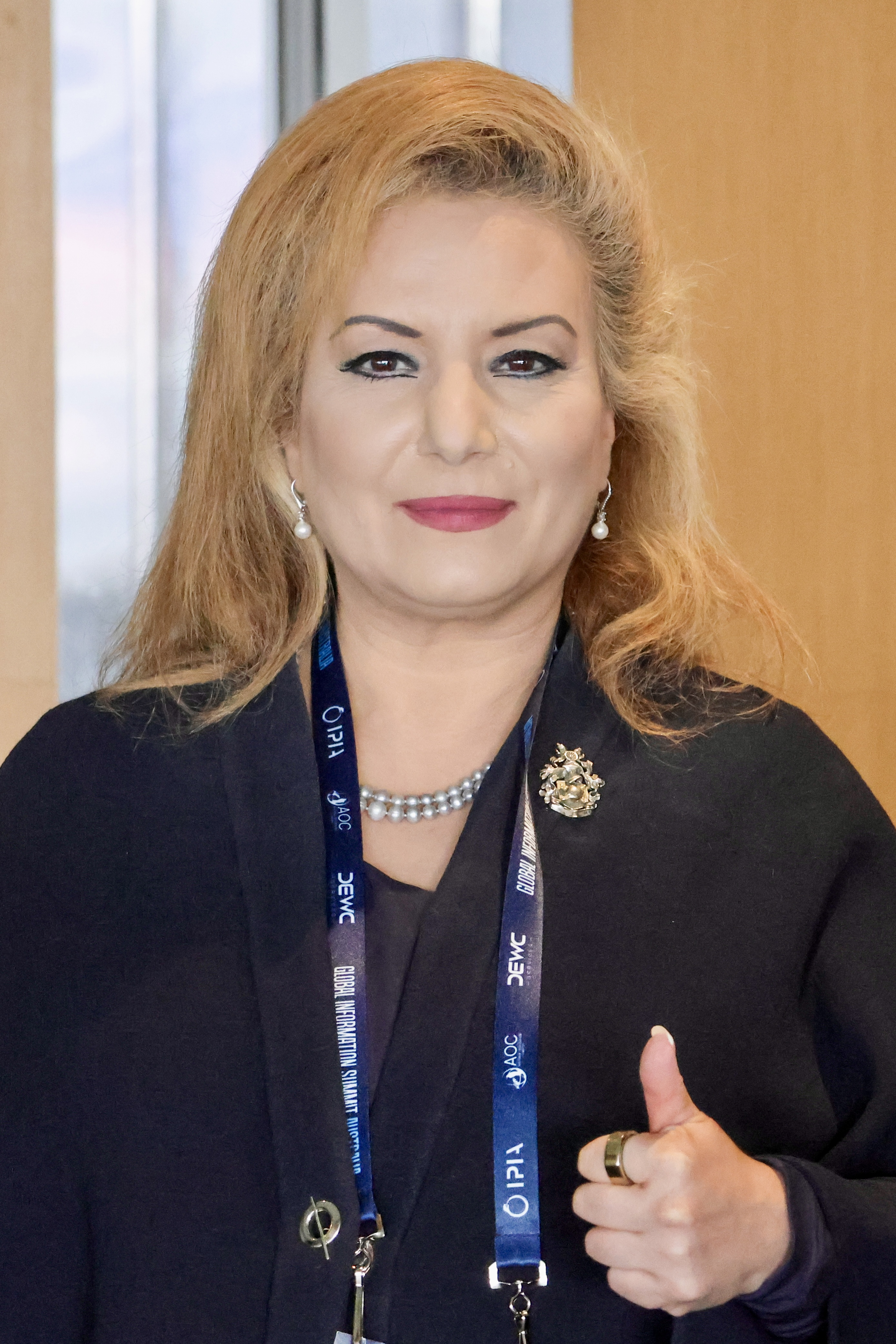
- Edhem in 2026

Court of Alderman
- Incumbent
- Assumed office July 2018
- Deputy: Christopher Boden
- Preceded by: Dame Fiona Woolf DBE DStJ

No5 Chambers Deputy Head of International Law
- Incumbent
- Assumed office September 2014

Court of Common Council Castle Baynard
- In office April 2014 – July 2018

Turkish British Chamber of Commerce and Industry Chairman
- Incumbent
- Assumed office November 2012

Personal details
- Born: August 1966 (age 59–60) London, England
- Children: 2
- Education: Goldsmiths, University of London; City, University of London
- Occupation: Barrister

Emma Edhem
- Motto: Others Before Self

Emma Edhem (born August 1966) is an Alderman in the City of London Corporation representing the ward of Candlewick. She is also Professor in Practice for Finance at Durham University, and a practicing barrister. Since June 2020, Edhem became Vice President for Greater London and Chairman of City in the Order of St. John. In April 2021, she became Master of the Bench for Distinguished Barristers at the Honourable Society of Gray's Inn. She has also held the position of Deputy Head of International Law at No5 Barristers Chambers since September 2014. In 2012, Edhem became the first woman to hold the post of Chairman of the Turkish British Chamber of Commerce and Industry (TBCCI). In 2011, Edhem served as counsel for Turkish Prime Minister Recep Tayyip Erdogan in a successful libel case against the Daily Telegraph.

Edhem previously served as Common Councilman for the ward of Castle Baynard prior to becoming Alderman; and is a Freeman of the City of London.

== Early life ==
Emma Edhem was born in London, England and received her Bachelor of Science in Psychology from Goldsmiths College, University of London and continued her education to receive a postgraduate diploma (CPE) in law at City, University of London. Edhem was called to the Bar in 1993, where she was in pupilage to Michael Latham before she was made a member of chambers of 4 King's Bench Walk of the Inner Temple. She was subsequently made Ad Eundem member of the Inner Temple.

== Election to Court of Common Council ==
On Thursday, 20 February 2014, Emma Edhem was elected to the Court of Common Council in the Ward of Castle Baynard after a contested by-election and the resignation of Raymond Catt. Edhem won 80% of the votes, and became one of eight Common Councilmen to serve the ward. At the time of the election, Edhem was serving as a barrister at No5 Chambers, and Chairman of the Turkish British Chamber of Commerce and Industry. Edhem was re-elected as Councilman on 23 March 2017.

== Election to Court of Alderman ==
On Thursday, 12 July 2018, Emma Edhem defeated her competitors, James de Sausmarez, William Charnley and Johnathan Bewes to become Alderman for the ward of Candlewick, and joined the Court of Aldermen. The Aldermanic seat was vacated by Dame Fiona Woolf earlier in the year. deSausmarez was a Councillor for Candlewick since 2015. Edhem at the time was an elected Councillor for the ward of Castle Baynard, and serving as Deputy Head of the International Law Group at No5 Barristers Chambers. Edhem became only the fifth woman in history to take a seat as Alderman of the City of London.

== Professional life ==
Edhem sits on the City of London's Court of Aldermen, General Purposes Committee, Nominations Committee to the Court of Aldermen, Court of Common Council, Finance Committee, Efficiency and Performance sub committee for Finance, Bridge House Estates, Community and Children’s Committee, the City of London Police Authority Board, Economic and Cyber Crime Board, Professional Standard and Integrity of the City Police, and Tackling Racism Task Force. She is also Court Assistant of the Worshipful Company of Woolmen, Worshipful Company of Educators, Vice President of the Greater London Priory Group and Chairman of the City Branch of the Order of St John. She is a practicing barrister at No5 Chambers, where she is deputy head of international law. She is also chair of the Turkish British Chamber of Commerce and Industry, the first woman to hold the position. She co-founded the Azerbaijani British Law Association, and served as President of the Turkish British Legal Society from 2002 until 2013. In December 2019, she was presented her Coat of Arms by the Windsor Herald, John Allen-Petrie.

== Video ==
- Feel the fear, and do it anyway Video for Turkish Turkish Women's International Network, (2016)
