= Suella Braverman =

British politician (born 1980)

The Right Honourable Suella Braverman KC MP
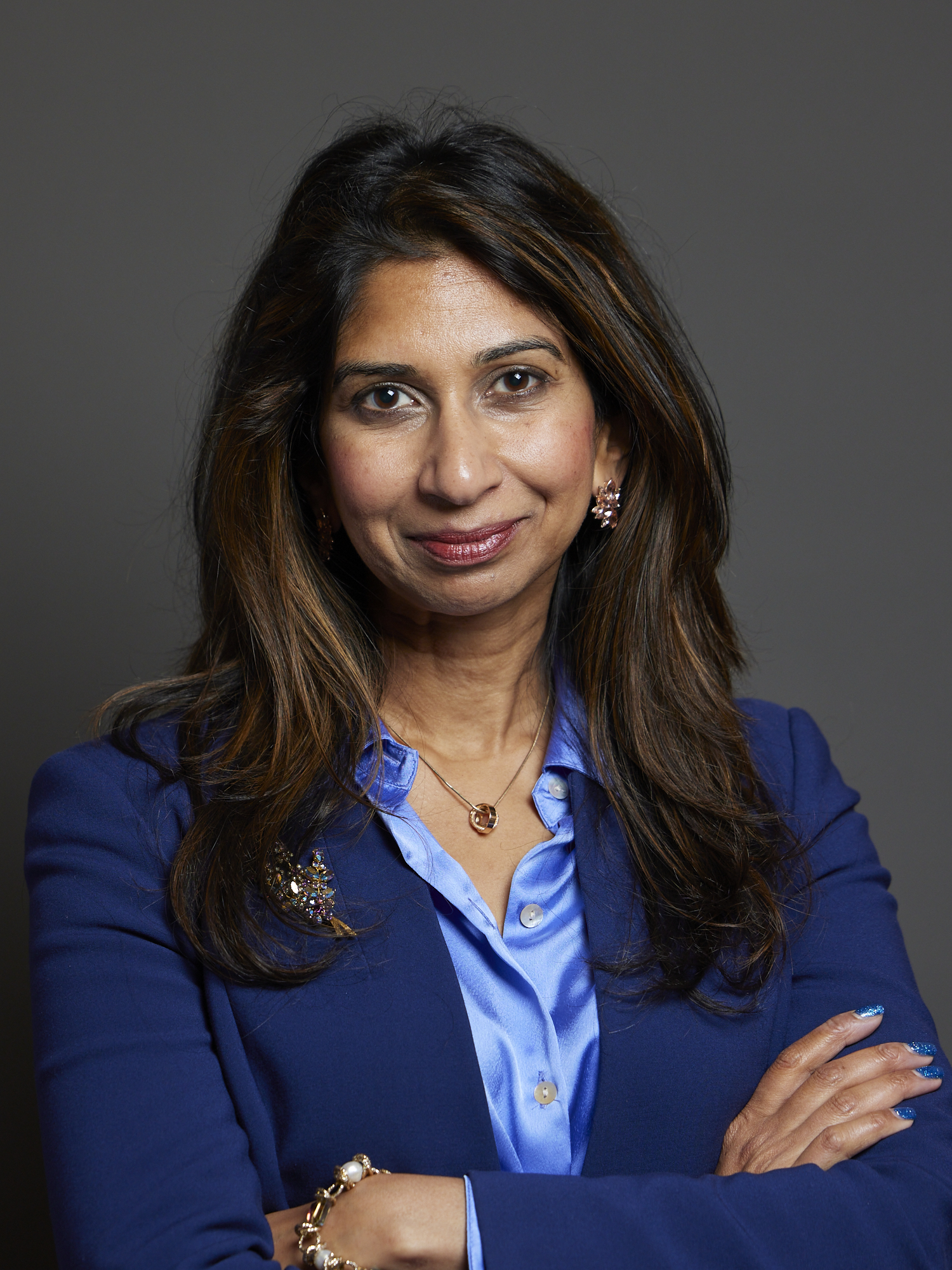
- Official portrait, 2024

Reform UK Spokesperson for Education, Skills and Equality
- Incumbent
- Assumed office 17 February 2026
- Leader: Nigel Farage
- Preceded by: Belinda de Lucy (Note: as Education and the Family spokesperson)

Home Secretary
- In office 25 October 2022 – 13 November 2023
- Prime Minister: Rishi Sunak
- Preceded by: Grant Shapps
- Succeeded by: James Cleverly
- In office 6 September 2022 – 19 October 2022
- Prime Minister: Liz Truss
- Preceded by: Priti Patel
- Succeeded by: Grant Shapps

Attorney General for England and Wales Advocate General for Northern Ireland
- In office 10 September 2021 – 6 September 2022
- Prime Minister: Boris Johnson
- Preceded by: Michael Ellis
- Succeeded by: Michael Ellis
- In office 13 February 2020 – 2 March 2021
- Prime Minister: Boris Johnson
- Preceded by: Geoffrey Cox
- Succeeded by: Michael Ellis

Minister on Leave
- In office 2 March 2021 – 10 September 2021
- Prime Minister: Boris Johnson
- Interim: Michael Ellis (Note: In accordance with the Ministerial and other Maternity Allowances Act 2021, Michael Ellis temporarily served as Attorney General during Braverman's maternity leave.)

Parliamentary Under-Secretary of State for Exiting the European Union
- In office 9 January 2018 – 15 November 2018
- Prime Minister: Theresa May
- Preceded by: Office established
- Succeeded by: Kwasi Kwarteng

Chair of the European Research Group
- In office 19 June 2017 – 9 January 2018
- Deputy: Michael Tomlinson
- Preceded by: Steve Baker
- Succeeded by: Jacob Rees-Mogg

Deputy Chair of the European Research Group
- In office 20 November 2016 – 19 June 2017 Serving with Michael Tomlinson
- Chair: Steve Baker
- Preceded by: Office established
- Succeeded by: Michael Tomlinson

Member of Parliament
- Incumbent
- Assumed office 7 May 2015
- Preceded by: Mark Hoban
- Constituency: Fareham (2015–2024); Fareham and Waterlooville (2024–present)
- Majority: 6,079 (12.1%)

Personal details
- Born: Sue-Ellen Cassiana Fernandes; 3 April 1980 (age 46) Harrow, London, England
- Party: Reform UK (2026–present)
- Other political affiliations: Conservative (2002–2026)
- Spouse: Rael Braverman (m. 2018)
- Children: 2
- Education: Queens’ College, Cambridge (BA); Panthéon-Sorbonne University (LLM)
- Website: suellabraverman.co.uk

Sue-Ellen Cassiana "Suella" Braverman (/suˈɛlə ˈbrævərmən/ soo-EL-ə BRAV-ər-mən; née Fernandes; born 3 April 1980) is a British politician and barrister who twice served as Home Secretary from 6 September 2022 to 19 October 2022, and again from 25 October 2022 to 13 November 2023.

As a member of the Conservatives, she was chair of the European Research Group from 2017 to 2018 and Attorney General for England and Wales from 2020 to March 2021, and again from September 2021 to 2022. She has been the Member of Parliament (MP) for Fareham and Waterlooville, previously Fareham, since 2015. Braverman was elected as a member of the Conservative Party, but defected to Reform UK on 26 January 2026.

In the January 2018 cabinet reshuffle, Braverman was appointed parliamentary under-secretary of state for exiting the European Union by Prime Minister Theresa May. In November 2018, she resigned in protest against May's draft Brexit withdrawal agreement. Braverman was appointed Attorney General for England and Wales and Advocate General for Northern Ireland by Prime Minister Boris Johnson in the February 2020 cabinet reshuffle; she was appointed as Queen's Counsel automatically on her appointment.

Following Johnson announcing his resignation in July 2022, Braverman stood as a candidate to succeed him in the July–September Conservative Party leadership election; she was eliminated from the ballot after the second round of voting. She subsequently supported Liz Truss's bid to become Conservative leader, and was appointed home secretary on 6 September 2022 when Truss became prime minister. Braverman resigned as home secretary on 19 October 2022 following public claims that she had broken the Ministerial Code after having sent a Cabinet document using her personal email address. Six days later, she was reinstated as home secretary by Truss's successor Rishi Sunak. She was dismissed from her post by Sunak in the November 2023 British cabinet reshuffle.

== Early life and education ==
Braverman was born Sue-Ellen Cassiana Fernandes on 3 April 1980 in Harrow, London, and raised in Wembley. She is the daughter of Indian Christian immigrants, Uma (née Mootien-Pillay) and Christie Fernandes, who had immigrated to Britain in the 1960s from Mauritius and Kenya respectively. She is named after the character Sue Ellen Ewing from the American television soap opera Dallas, of which her mother was a fan, but Sue-Ellen was abbreviated to Suella by her primary school teachers. Her mother is an Indian-Mauritian of Tamil descent, and was a nurse and a councillor in Brent, and the Conservative candidate for Tottenham in the 2001 general election and the 2003 Brent East by-election. Her father is an Indian-Kenyan of Goan descent. She is the niece of Mahen Kundasamy, a former Mauritian High Commissioner to the United Kingdom.

She attended the Uxendon Manor Primary School in Brent and the fee-paying Heathfield School in Pinner, on a partial scholarship, after which she read law at Queens' College of the University of Cambridge. During her undergraduate studies, she was chairman of the Cambridge University Conservative Association.

Braverman lived in France for two years, as an Erasmus Programme student and then as an Entente Cordiale Scholar, where she studied for a master's degree in European and French law at Panthéon-Sorbonne University.

== Legal career ==
Braverman was called to the bar at Middle Temple in 2005. She completed pupillage at 2–3 Gray's Inn Square (now Cornerstone Barristers) but did not start tenancy there, beginning practice at the London branch of a large Birmingham set, No5 Chambers. She worked in litigation including the judicial review "basics" for a government practitioner of immigration and planning law. She passed the New York bar examination in 2006, becoming licensed to practise law in the state until the licence was suspended in 2021 after she did not re-register as an attorney. (Note: Attorneys registered to practise in New York state must re-register and pay a fee every two years. Attorneys who do not re-register, resign, or retire, are suspended.) She was appointed to the Attorney General's C panel of counsel, the entry level, undertaking basic government cases, in 2010.

Braverman founded the Africa Justice Foundation in 2010 alongside barristers Cherie Booth and Philip Riches.

== Parliamentary career ==
Braverman's name was already on the list of Conservative parliamentary candidates at the time of the 2003 Brent East by-election, and she had to be persuaded not to seek the nomination. Her mother, Uma Fernandes, a Conservative councillor, was selected to fight the seat, and Braverman campaigned for her. At the 2005 general election, Braverman contested Leicester East, finishing in second place behind Labour's Keith Vaz, who won with a 15,876-vote (38.4%) majority. She sought selection as the Conservative candidate in Bexhill and Battle, but was unsuccessful, and was eventually selected to be the Conservative candidate for Fareham in Hampshire. Braverman also sought election to the London Assembly at the 2012 Assembly elections and was placed fourth on the Conservative London-wide list; only the first three Conservative candidates were elected.

Braverman was elected to the House of Commons as the MP for Fareham at the 2015 general election with 56.1% of the vote and a majority of 22,262. She gave her maiden speech on 1 June 2015. She has taken a particular interest in education, home affairs and justice and has written for The Daily Telegraph, Bright Blue, i News, HuffPost, Brexit Central and ConservativeHome. She was a member of the British delegation to the Parliamentary Assembly of the Council of Europe from 2015 to 2017, and was a full member of the Assembly's Committee on the Election of Judges to the European Court of Human Rights.

Braverman opened a Westminster Hall debate in the House of Commons on the failings of Southern Health NHS Foundation Trust and chaired meetings with the Trust's executives and with other MPs on the All-Party Parliamentary Group for Hampshire, in which instances of poor care quality and the deaths of patients were investigated.

Braverman campaigned to leave the European Union in the 2016 EU membership referendum; a majority (55%) of votes in her constituency were for Leave. She was chair of the European Research Group, a pro-Leave group of Conservative MPs, from May 2017 until her promotion to ministerial office; she was replaced by Jacob Rees-Mogg. At the 2017 general election, Braverman was re-elected, increasing her share of the vote to 63.0% but decreasing her majority to 21,555. Following the election, she was appointed parliamentary private secretary to the ministers of the Treasury.

During the January 2018 reshuffle, Braverman was appointed as parliamentary under-secretary of state at the Department for Exiting the European Union. On 15 November 2018, Braverman resigned on the same day that David Davis's successor, Dominic Raab, resigned as Brexit secretary in protest at Theresa May and Olly Robbins's draft Brexit deal, which had been released the day before.

In March 2019, Braverman stated in a speech for the Bruges Group that "as Conservatives, we are engaged in a battle against Cultural Marxism". Journalist Dawn Foster challenged Braverman's use of the term "cultural Marxism", highlighting its antisemitic history and stating it was a theory in the manifesto of the mass murderer Anders Breivik. Braverman's use of the term was initially condemned as hate speech by other MPs, the Board of Deputies of British Jews and the anti-racist organisation Hope not Hate, among other anti-racist charities. Braverman denied that the term was an antisemitic trope, saying, "We have culture evolving from the far left which has allowed the snuffing out of freedom of speech, freedom of thought. ... I'm very aware of that ongoing creep of cultural Marxism, which has come from Jeremy Corbyn." After meeting with her later, the Board of Deputies of British Jews said in a subsequent statement that she is "not in any way antisemitic", saying it believed that she did not "intentionally use antisemitic language", while finding that she "is clearly a good friend of the Jewish community" and that they were "sorry to see that the whole matter has caused distress".

At the 2019 general election, Braverman was again re-elected, increasing her share of the vote to 63.7% and increasing her majority to 26,086.

Under the 2023 review of Westminster constituencies, her Fareham constituency was dissolved and merged with part of Meon Valley to form "Fareham and Waterlooville". Her rival in the selection process was Meon Valley MP Flick Drummond. On 5 April 2023, the re-selection vote was held and Braverman won the vote by 77 votes to 54.

At the 2024 general election, Braverman was elected to Parliament as MP for Fareham and Waterlooville with 35% of the vote and a majority of 6,079.

=== Attorney general ===
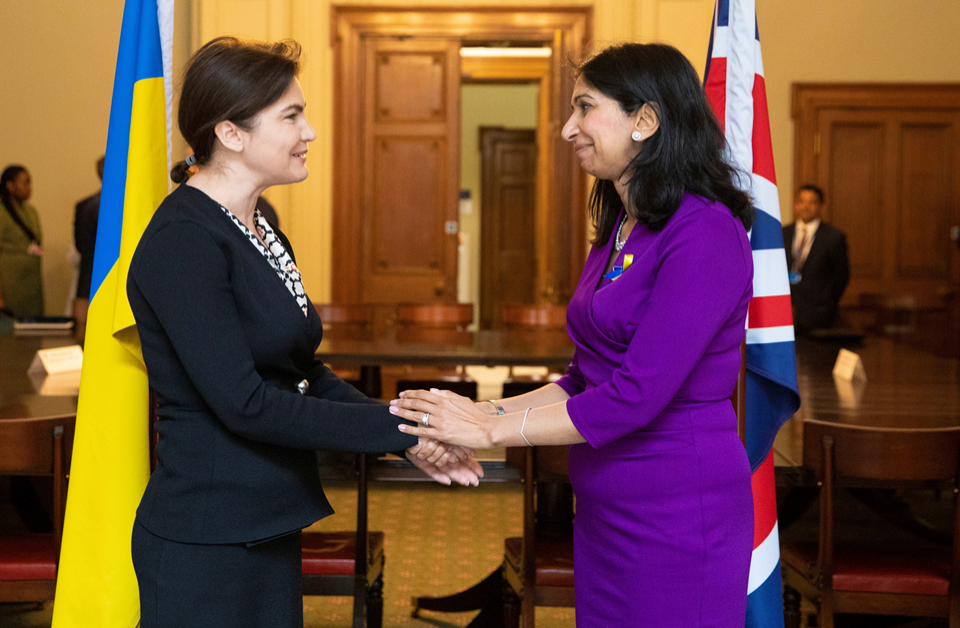
Braverman in her role as attorney general meeting prosecutor general of Ukraine Iryna Venediktova in May 2022

In the 13 February 2020 reshuffle, Braverman was appointed Attorney General for England and Wales and Advocate General for Northern Ireland, succeeding Geoffrey Cox who had been dismissed from government. Braverman was made QC at the time of this appointment. She was later criticised by members of the Bar Council for her poor choices in the role.

Braverman was designated as a minister on leave while pregnant on 2 March 2021, shortly after the Ministerial and other Maternity Allowances Act 2021 was enacted to allow this arrangement. Michael Ellis became acting attorney general until she resumed office on 11 September 2021.

=== Leadership candidate ===
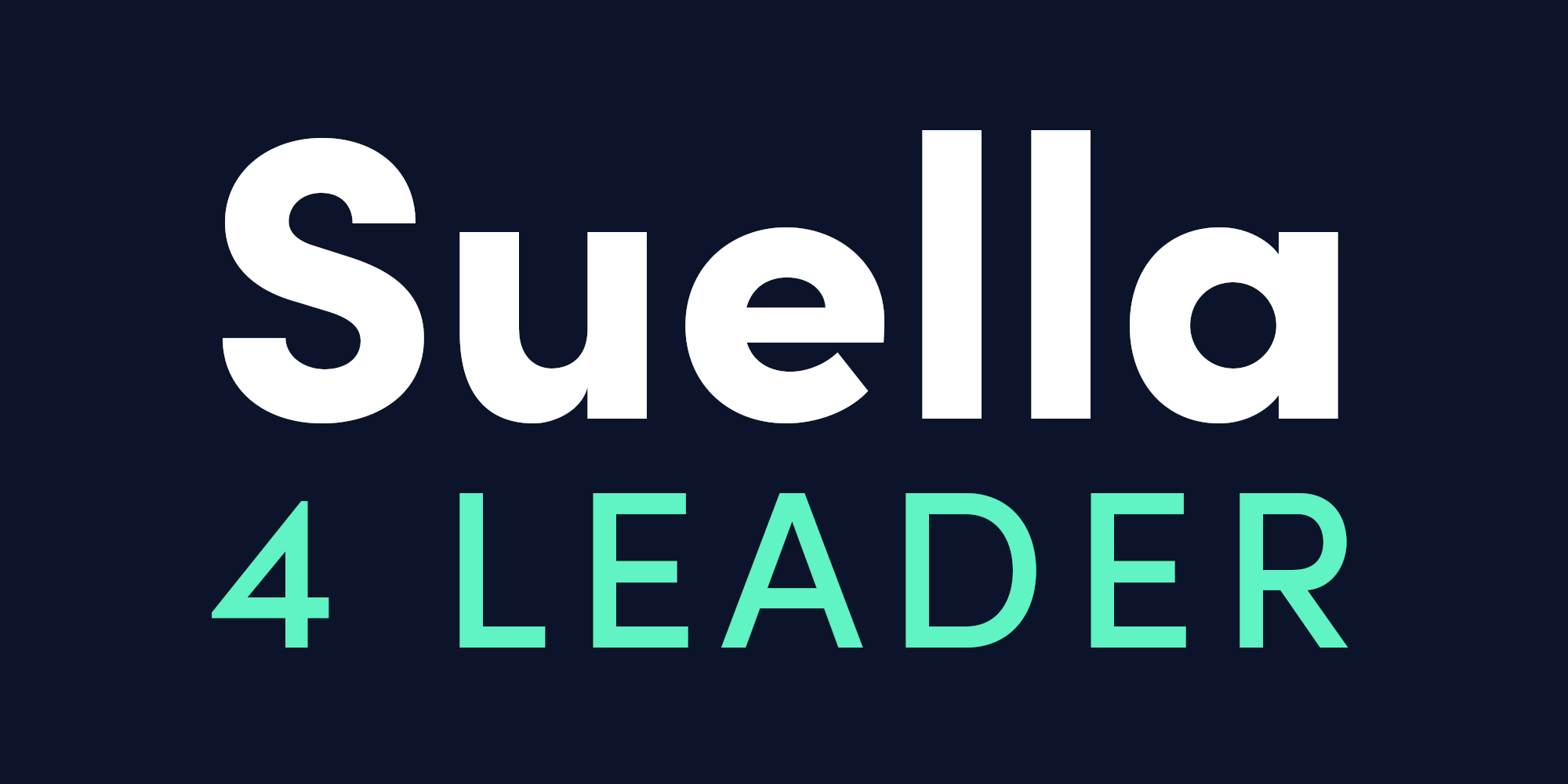
Logo used by Braverman's leadership bid

During the July 2022 United Kingdom government crisis, Braverman remained a minister, though on 6 July 2022, she called for Boris Johnson to resign. She stood in the ensuing Conservative Party leadership election, but was eliminated from the race in the second round of ballots, winning 27 votes, a reduction on her vote in the first round and the lowest of the remaining candidates. She then endorsed Liz Truss.

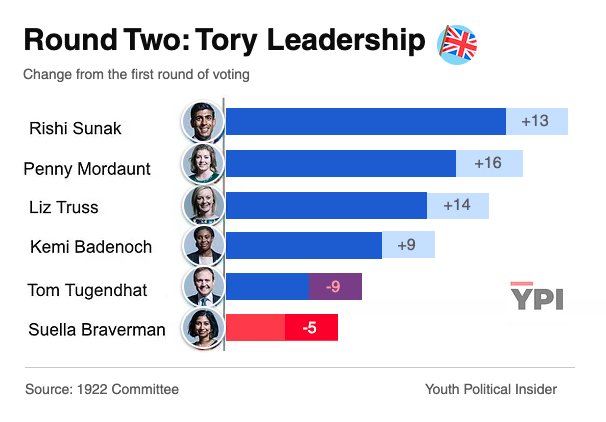
Braverman was eliminated in round 2.

Had she succeeded in being appointed prime minister, Braverman said her priorities would have been to deliver tax cuts, cut government spending, tackle the cost of living challenges, "solve the problem of boats crossing the Channel", deliver "Brexit opportunities", withdraw the UK from the European Convention of Human Rights and "get rid of all of this woke rubbish". She also said she would suspend the UK's target of net zero carbon emissions by 2050. In August 2022, The Guardian reported that Braverman's leadership campaign had received a £10,000 donation from a company owned by the climate change denier Terence Mordaunt.

=== Home Secretary first term (2022) ===
Braverman was appointed Home Secretary in the new Truss ministry on 6 September 2022.

In October 2022, Braverman said that she would love to see a front page of The Daily Telegraph sending asylum seekers to Rwanda, and described it as her "dream" and "obsession". The first attempted flight by the UK to send asylum seekers to Rwanda in June 2022 resulted in asylum seekers being restrained and attached to plane seats after self-harming and threatening suicide. On the matter, the UN Refugee Agency said that the "arrangement, which amongst other concerns seeks to shift responsibility and lacks necessary safeguards, is incompatible with the letter and spirit of the 1951 Convention" in regard to the rights of refugees. Later Amber Rudd, a former Conservative Home Secretary, criticised the plans to send some asylum seekers to Rwanda as "brutal" and "impractical".

In October 2022, in the midst of a speech advocating for the government's Public Order Bill, she held responsible the "coalition of chaos" formed by Labour, the Liberal Democrats, and the progressive activists she referred to as the "Guardian-reading, tofu-eating wokerati", for the series of protests that led to disruptive scenarios on the streets of London.

Braverman left her cabinet position as Home Secretary on 19 October 2022. She said that her departure was because she had made an "honest mistake" by sharing an official document from her personal email address with a colleague in Parliament, Sir John Hayes, an action which breached the Ministerial Code. Braverman was highly critical of Truss's leadership in her resignation letter.

=== Return as Home Secretary (2022–2023) ===
On 25 October 2022, Braverman was reappointed as the Home Secretary by Prime Minister Rishi Sunak upon the formation of the Sunak ministry. Braverman's reappointment was challenged by Labour Party MPs, Liberal Democrats, Scottish National Party MPs and some Conservatives. The Labour leader and Leader of the Opposition, Keir Starmer, raised it as the subject of his first question to Rishi Sunak at Sunak's first Prime Minister's questions on 26 October 2022. Sunak said Braverman "made an error of judgment but she recognised that she raised the matter and she accepted her mistake". Jake Berry, who was dismissed by Sunak after becoming PM, said that "from my own knowledge, there were multiple breaches of the ministerial code".

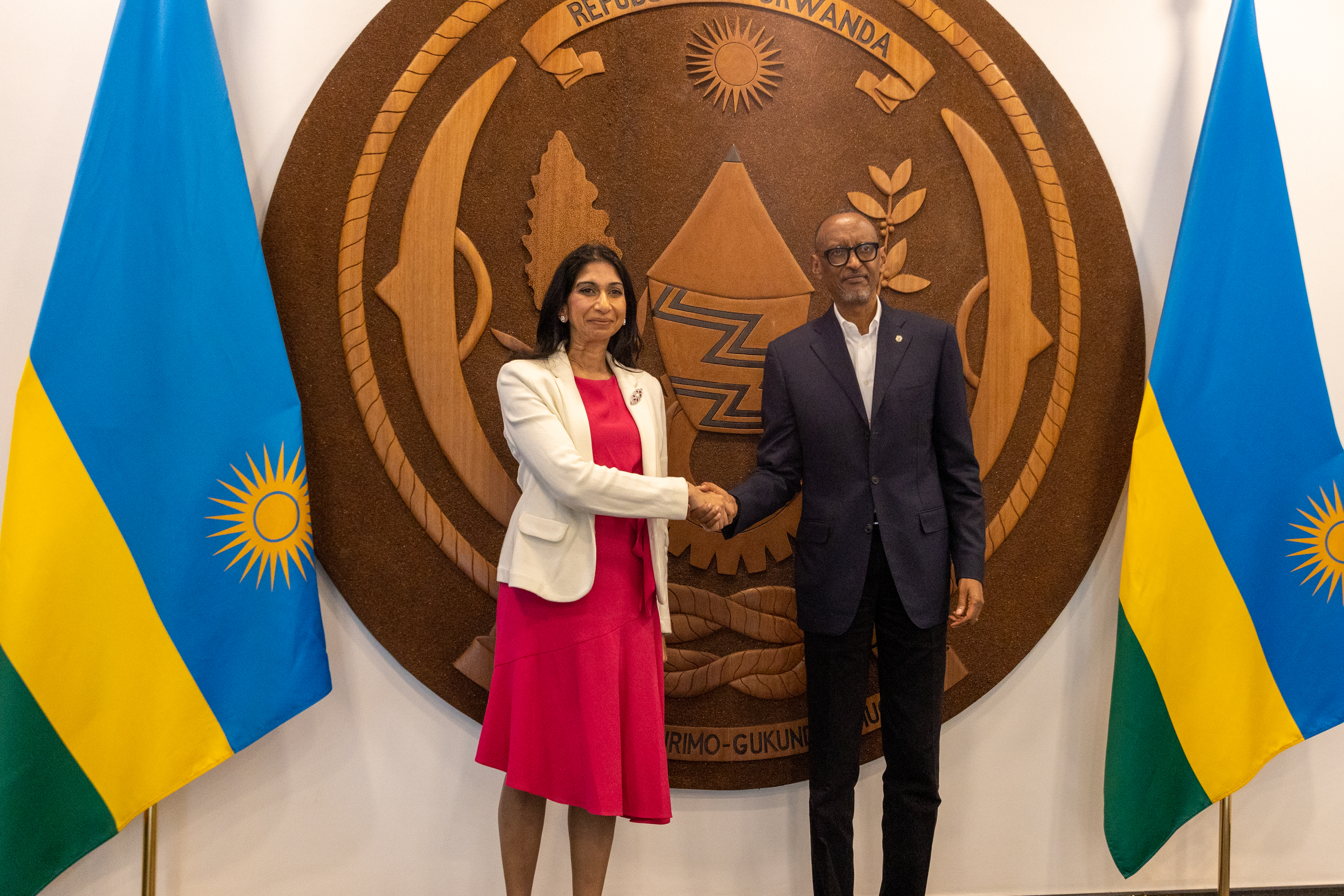
Braverman with Rwandan President Paul Kagame, 19 March 2023

There were demands by Labour and the Liberal Democrats, as well as Conservative MP Caroline Nokes, for an inquiry into Braverman's return to the cabinet despite the alleged security breach. The government did not launch an inquiry into Braverman. The Public Administration and Constitutional Affairs Select Committee was strongly critical of the decision to reappoint Braverman. The committee stated that reappointing Braverman created a dangerous precedent. Leaking restricted material "is worthy of significant sanction under the new graduated sanctions regime (...) including resignation and a significant period out of office." The committee also stated a later change in prime minister should not allow a minister to return to office in a shorter period. "To allow this (...) does not inspire confidence in the integrity of government nor offer much incentive to proper conduct in future."

In January 2023, Braverman dropped three of the 30 recommendations set out in the Windrush Lessons Learned Review. These recommendations, which had been accepted by then home secretary Priti Patel, concerned organizing reconciliation events, enhancing the powers of the Independent Chief Inspector of Borders and Immigration, and committing to the establishment of a Migrants' Commissioner. In June 2024 the High Court ruled that this decision was unlawful.

In March 2023, Braverman visited Rwanda and viewed housing which might be used by asylum seekers. The Court of Appeal judges have rendered a verdict stating that sending asylum seekers to Rwanda for claim processing is unlawful. The judges concluded that government officials were mistaken in placing their trust in unsupported guarantees from Rwanda, where it was acknowledged that inadequate procedures would be enhanced.

Braverman's comments on illegal immigration have spoken of "invasion" and on child protection from "grooming gangs" – language criticised by "Tory MPs, peers and activists", alongside international agencies and rights groups, as inflammatory, with Sayeeda Warsi calling it "racist rhetoric", and an anonymous former senior minister under Boris Johnson saying "Conservative reputation on discrimination has dropped to a new low" on Braverman's watch. A Home Office spokesperson responded that the home secretary would "not shy away from telling hard truths", a sentiment reiterated by Braverman, who said it was "not racist" to tell "plain truths", or to want to cut illegal immigration.

Downing Street meanwhile denied that the talk of "grooming gangs" was indicative of the party resorting to dog-whistle politics. In October 2022, Braverman likewise stated that it was "not racist" to want to control the UK's borders. Joan Salter, a Holocaust survivor, confronted Braverman over her rhetoric on 14 January 2023. Salter told Braverman, "When I hear you using words against refugees like 'swarms' and an 'invasion', I am reminded of the language used to dehumanise and justify the murder of my family and millions of others." Ruling on a complaint made about an article in The Mail on Sunday written by Braverman, Ipso said in September 2023 that her comment about British-Pakistani men's involvement in child sexual abuse gangs was "significantly misleading".

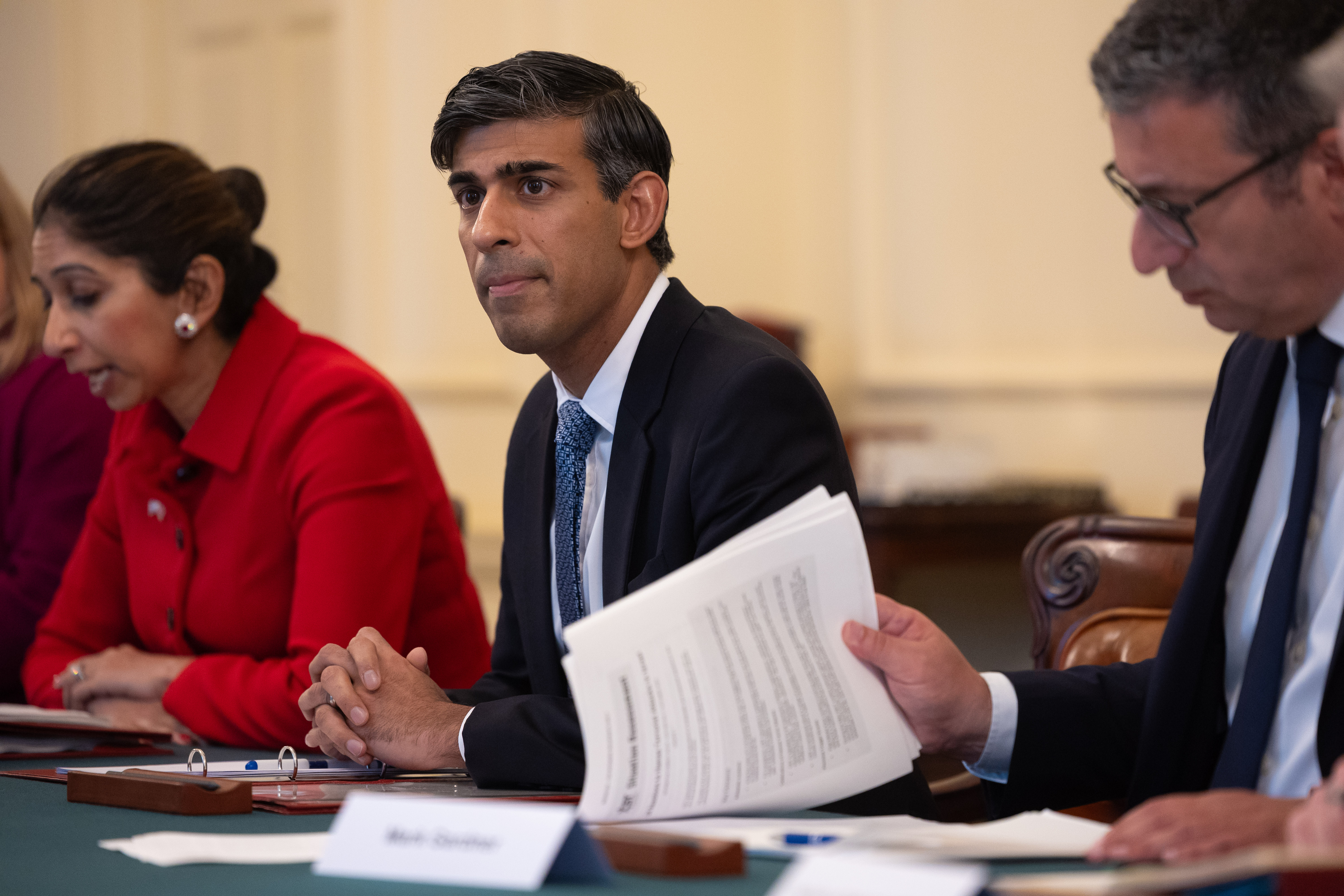
Braverman with Prime Minister Rishi Sunak on 12 October 2023

In April 2023, Braverman unveiled a proposition to house approximately 500 single adult men on Bibby Stockholm, a barge. The proposal was implemented in August of the same year and sparked a notable political response amongst both Labour and Conservative MPs due to the backdrop of the Home Office's escalated stringent policies targeting refugees, intended to curtail the frequency of small boat crossings amid the European migrant crisis. On 2 August 2023, the Fire Brigades Union (FBU) wrote to Braverman to request a meeting to talk about their concerns over the safety of the barge.

In July 2023, Braverman personally intervened to prevent Siyabonga Twala, a British resident who had travelled from Manchester to Istanbul for a family holiday, from returning to the UK, ordering his exclusion "on the basis of serious criminality" in relation to a cannabis offence five years previously. Siyabonga Twala's solicitors said Braverman's intervention set a "worrying precedent" for the use of exclusion order in barring people from reentry into the UK in setting "such a low bar to what is considered a serious criminal". In June 2024, just before a court hearing, the Home Office withdrew the exclusion order, enabling Twala to return to the UK.

In November 2023, Braverman proposed new laws in England and Wales to limit the use of tents by homeless people, stating that many of them see it as "a lifestyle choice". She said the government would always support those who were genuinely homeless, but planned to stop "those who cause nuisance and distress to other people by pitching tents in public spaces, aggressively begging, stealing, taking drugs, littering and blighting our communities." Her comments were criticised by opposition MPs. The Housing charity Shelter said: "Living on the streets is not a lifestyle choice." Rishi Sunak later cancelled her plan to restrict the use of tents by homeless people.

Following the October 7 attacks on Israel, Braverman said in a letter to chief constables in England and Wales: "I would encourage police to consider whether chants such as: 'From the river to the sea, Palestine will be free' (...) in certain contexts may amount to a racially aggravated section 5 public order offence", adding that "Behaviours that are legitimate in some circumstances, for example the waving of a Palestinian flag, may not be legitimate such as when intended to glorify acts of terrorism".

She later described subsequent pro-Palestine marches during the Gaza war as "hate marches (...) chanting for the erasure of Israel from the map" containing a "large number of bad actors who are deliberately operating beneath the criminal threshold". In criticism of marches proposed to take place on Armistice Day, she cited "reports that some of Saturday's march group organisers have links to terrorist groups, including Hamas" and compared it to marches in Northern Ireland. Scotland's First Minister Humza Yousaf called for her resignation and accused her of "fanning the flames of division". The Labour Party and some police officers said that Braverman's writing had led to far-right supporters attacking police on 11 November.

Braverman wrote an opinion piece that was published in The Times on 8 November which included a statement that there was "a perception that senior police officers play favourites when it comes to protesters" and were tougher on right-wing extremists than pro-Palestinian "mobs". The Guardian reported that the Prime Minister's office had asked for changes to be made to the article, but not all were implemented.

Braverman was dismissed as Home Secretary in the cabinet reshuffle of 13 November 2023, and was replaced by James Cleverly, who had been the Foreign Secretary. According to The Guardian, the trigger for her sacking was her Times article. The Telegraph throws doubt on this view, reporting that David Cameron was offered the role of foreign secretary on 7 November 2023, the day before Braverman's Times article was published.

=== Return to the backbenches (2023–2025) ===
In December 2023, Braverman delivered a speech in the House of Commons in which she argued that "the Conservative Party faces electoral oblivion" if the Government's policy of deporting asylum seekers to Rwanda was not introduced.

In January 2024, Braverman joined pro-Israel protesters at a rally in London held to mark 100 days since the Gaza war.

In June 2024, while speaking to the Times, Braverman suggested that the Conservative Party should "welcome" Nigel Farage into the party to "unite the right".

In July 2024, after the Conservative Party's loss in the 2024 General Election, Braverman delivered a speech at the National Conservatism Conference in Washington, D.C., where she attributed the party's defeat to the influence of "liberal Conservatives." Later that month, following Rishi Sunak's resignation as leader of the Conservative Party, Braverman unexpectedly announced that she would not be standing for leader.

In August 2024, it was disclosed that Braverman had given several paid speeches internationally, including in India, South Korea, and the United States, and had earned nearly £60,000 from these engagements.

In January 2025, Braverman attended Donald Trump's presidential inauguration in Washington, D.C., and was seen wearing a 'Make America Great Again' cap. Later that month, Braverman delivered the Margaret Thatcher Freedom Lecture at The Heritage Foundation in Washington, D.C. and raised the question of whether the United Kingdom could become "the first Islamist nation with nuclear weapons", whilst saying she did not think that was a realistic outcome.

=== Reform UK (2026–present) ===
On 26 January 2026, Braverman defected to Reform UK. Braverman said on the matter, "Britain is indeed broken. She is suffering. She is not well. Immigration is out of control. Our public services are on their knees. People don't feel safe." She became the fourth sitting Conservative MP to defect to Reform UK since the 2024 general election.

The Conservative Party responded by saying it was "always a matter of when, not if, Suella would defect", and that "The Conservatives did all we could to look after Suella's mental health, but she was clearly very unhappy". The party stated that this statement was issued in error, and subsequently Conservative leader Kemi Badenoch apologised and denounced the remarks.

During a vote on a government bill to abolish Universal Credit restrictions for families with more than two children, Braverman and fellow Reform MP Robert Jenrick were reported to have "accidentally" voted in favour of the bill (which passed by a majority of 354) after entering the wrong division lobby.

On 17 February 2026, Braverman was appointed to Nigel Farage's frontbench team as spokesperson for Education, Skills and Equalities.

== Political and legal positions ==
Braverman was ideologically on the right-wing of the Conservative Party. She was a supporter of Brexit, supports the withdrawal of the UK from the European Convention on Human Rights and supports sending cross-Channel migrants to Rwanda. In a May 2022 article, she said, "If I get trolled and I provoke a bad response on Twitter I know I'm doing the right thing. Twitter is a sewer of left-wing bile. The extreme left pile on is often a consequence of sound conservative values."

=== Education ===
Braverman was the founding chair of governors at the Michaela Community School, and supported plans to create a free school in Fareham. In 2017 she sat on the advisory board of the New Schools Network, a charity which aims to support groups setting up free schools within the English state education sector.

=== Foreign policy ===
Braverman, who is of Indian heritage, said that she feared a trade deal with India would increase migration to the UK when Indians already represented the largest group of people who overstayed their visa.

==== Israeli–Palestinian conflict ====
In October 2023, she condemned Hamas's actions during the Gaza war and expressed her support for Israel. She called for legislation that criminalises boycotts of Israel, saying that "Israel is a beacon of democracy in the Middle East. Defending Israel is not part of the culture wars. It is symbolic of defending humanity." She consistently criticised those who took part in the protests against the Israeli attack on Gaza, urging the police to take action on any attempts by protesters to use flags, songs or swastikas to harass members of the Jewish community. Keir Starmer accused her of "sowing the seeds of hatred".

In July 2024, Braverman criticised the British government's decision to restore funding to UNRWA, stating that the decision was "naive, dangerous and shameful" and diverted "British taxpayer cash to Hamas". During an interview with Nick Ferrari, she stated that Israel was acting within international law and she did not believe there was a genocide in Gaza.

==== Legacy of the British Empire ====
Braverman has described herself as a "child of the British Empire". Her parents, who were from Mauritius and Kenya, came to the UK "with an admiration and gratitude for what Britain did for Mauritius and Kenya, and India". She believes that on the whole, "the British Empire was a force for good", and described herself as being "proud of the British Empire". In a July 2026 post, she called for former colonies of the British Empire to pay reparations to the United Kingdom.

=== Immigration and national culture ===
Braverman has criticised multiculturalism, saying that it allowed people to "come to our society and live parallel lives in it" and that it "makes no demands of the incomer to integrate".

In May 2023, Braverman spoke at the National Conservatism Conference in London. In her speech, she stated that immigration threatened the country's "national character", and that Britons should be trained to do the jobs where immigrants are currently employed.

Writing for The Daily Telegraph in a February 2025 article titled "I will never be truly English", Braverman argued that despite being born and educated in England, she is not English and "cannot claim to be". She wrote that the English national identity "must be rooted in ancestry, heritage, and, yes, ethnicity – not just residence or fluency". Describing herself as British Asian, she said that she doesn't "feel English" because she has "no generational ties to English soil". She wrote "How many generations must pass before one can claim to be English? Five? Six? It is a question without an easy answer."

These comments drew sharp criticism from Sathnam Sanghera, Sunder Katwala and Jolyon Maugham, among others. Katwala said that despite her call to "defend Judeo-Christian civilization", Braverman's position would mean that the large majority of British Jews could not be English. Ian Dunt said: "It's the view of almost everyone in this country that you can be English without being white." Conservative former Prime Minister Rishi Sunak and Shadow Foreign Secretary Priti Patel affirmed that they do consider themselves English, with Sunak saying that he found Braverman and Kisin's position "ridiculous".

==== Refugees ====
In June 2023, while serving as Home Secretary, Braverman described the relocation of 21,000 people to the UK under the Afghan Relocation and Assistance Policy (ARAP), and the Afghan Citizens Resettlement Scheme (ACRS) as "a good track record".

In September 2023, Braverman spoke at the American Enterprise Institute in Washington. In this speech, she argued that the UN's 1951 Convention on Refugees needed reforming, questioning if it was "fit for our modern age". In the same speech, she also said that being gay or a woman was insufficient to qualify for asylum; stating:

Let me be clear, there are vast swathes of the world where it is extremely difficult to be gay, or to be a woman. Where individuals are being persecuted, it is right that we offer sanctuary. But we will not be able to sustain an asylum system if in effect, simply being gay, or a woman, and fearful of discrimination in your country of origin, is sufficient to qualify for protection.

This led to criticism from members of the Labour Party and also by Andrew Boff, a patron of the LGBT+ wing of the Conservative Party. However, Conservative MP Michael Fabricant, another patron of the LGBT+ group, said that claiming to be gay "should not provide the key to entry to our country". The United Nations High Commissioner for Refugees rejected Braverman's calls for reform.

=== LGBTQ issues ===
In a May 2022 interview with The Times, Braverman said that schools do not have to accommodate requests from students who wish to change how others recognise their gender, including the use of the pronouns, uniforms, lavatories and changing facilities of their identified gender if it differs from their sex. She argued that, legally, under-18s are entitled to be treated only by the gender corresponding to their sex and that the "unquestioning approach" adopted by some teachers and schools is the reason different parts of the country have very different rates of children presenting as transgender. Some of her statements have been criticised by trans advocates as transphobic.

In May 2023, in a speech at the National Conservatism Conference, she expressed opposition to what she referred to as "radical gender ideology".

On 13 March 2024, Braverman wrote an article for The Telegraph in which she discussed J. K. Rowling's views on transgender people. She voiced support for Rowling's stances, including Rowling's comments calling the broadcaster India Willoughby, a transgender woman, a man. Braverman joined Rowling in doing so, saying, "India Willoughby is a trans woman. That means, with all respect to India, he is a man."

In July 2024 Braverman in a speech at the National Conservatism Conference in Washington, D.C., said that the Conservative Party had failed to "stop the lunatic woke virus" after a Pride flag was flown at the Home Office. She said "what the Progress flag says to me is one monstrous thing: that I was the member of a government that presided over the mutilation of children in our hospitals and from our schools" (referring to gender-affirming surgery). Two Conservative candidates Iain Dale and Casey Byrne criticised her. Dale added: "And she seriously thinks she has a chance of leading the Conservative party. Not while I have a breath in my body". Byrne said: "I urged all decent people to speak up ... this cannot be allowed to go without consequences." Braverman supports same-sex marriage.

=== Rights and responsibilities ===
In a December 2015 op-ed, Braverman wrote, "In essence, rights have come to fill the space once occupied by generosity." She quoted Eric Posner's theories on what the Brazilian state sees as its right to use torture by "the police in the name of crime prevention. They justify this by putting a general right to live free from crime and intimidation above the rights of those who are tortured." She concluded,

To correct the imbalance, perhaps we should adopt a Universal Declaration of Responsibilities and Duties, to be read in tandem with that on Human Rights? A fair, decent and reasonable society should question the dilution of our sense of duty, the demotion of our grasp of responsibility and our virtual abandonment of the spirit of civic obligation. What we do for others should matter more than the selfish assertion of personal rights and the lonely individualism to which it gives rise.

== Allegations of misconduct ==
=== Complaint to the Bar Standards Board ===
Nine organisations wrote a letter to the Bar Standards Board in May 2023 alleging that Braverman had violated the Bar's code of conduct regarding "racist sentiments and discriminatory narratives". They referred to comments Braverman made in 2022, referring to people reaching the UK by crossing the Channel in small boats as an 'invasion', as well as comments about sexual grooming gang members being predominantly British-Pakistani men who "hold cultural values totally at odds with British values".

=== Legal contribution accusations ===
Braverman's details on the No5 Chambers website state that she "is a contributor to Philip Kolvin QC's book Gambling for Local Authorities, Licensing, Planning and Regeneration". The Observer had questioned this in 2020 and, in October 2022, The Big Issue reported Kolvin saying that she "did not make a written or editorial contribution to the book", but simply "on one occasion I asked her to do some photocopying for the book". Braverman's parliamentary office, the Home Office and No5 Chambers all declined to comment, but the claim was removed from the website after The Big Issue had enquired.

"The Secret Barrister" told The Big Issue, "For a practising barrister to include on a chambers profile something which is not merely an exaggeration but knowing false, is the type of dishonest conduct that should rightly attract the attention of the Bar Standards Board." It was later reported by Private Eye that the Bar Standards Board was investigating a complaint that she had made a "dishonest statement out of self-interest to promote her career".

Private Eye also reported that her MP's website had said that she was involved "in the lengthy Guantanamo Bay Inquiry into the treatment of detainees by US and UK forces", although her name does not appear in the inquiry report, and suggested she may merely have been one of scores of lawyers who had sifted through documents.

=== Alleged breach of the ministerial code ===
In May 2023, it was reported that, following an incident where she was caught speeding by police while she was Attorney General for England and Wales, Braverman asked whether civil servants could arrange for her an option to take a driving awareness course as a private one-to-one session rather than the standard group course with other motorists. They refused, and reported the request to the Cabinet Office. Braverman then asked one of her political aides to assist her, who asked the course providers whether aliases could be used with online courses and whether cameras could be switched off. The providers said those options were not available.

The Liberal Democrats and Labour, which suggested the matter could be a breach of the ministerial code, called for an inquiry by the prime minister's independent adviser on ministerial interests and "ethics chief", Sir Laurie Magnus. Prime Minister Rishi Sunak said that after consulting Magnus, he had decided that further investigation was not necessary, and that the incident did not constitute a breach of the Ministerial Code.

== Personal life ==
In 2018, she married Rael Braverman, a manager of the Mercedes-Benz Group, whom she described as a "very proud member of the Jewish community". The wedding was celebrated at the House of Commons in February 2018. Rael Braverman, who moved to the UK as a teenager from South Africa, formerly lived in Israel. Suella Braverman told The Jewish Chronicle that she has "close family members who serve in the IDF". As of 2021, they have two children. She lives in Locks Heath, Hampshire.

Braverman was briefly involved with the Triratna Buddhist Community, formerly the Friends of the Western Buddhist Order, but was never an ordained member of the Triratna Buddhist Order. She took her oath of allegiance as an MP on the Buddhist Dhammapada.

In July 2024, Braverman was one of five politicians to cover for James O'Brien's radio show on LBC, as part of the station's "Guest Week".

In December 2024, Rael Braverman joined Reform UK, but resigned seven months later after his wife was criticised by Reform's former chairman over a political matter. However, she would herself join Reform in January 2026.

== Awards and honours ==
=== Awards ===
- At the 2022 Asian Achievers Awards, Braverman was named as the first ever recipient the organisation's inaugural Queen Elizabeth II Woman Of The Year Award.
- Braverman was named "political disruptor of the year" at the 2023 Spectator magazine's Parliamentarian Of The Year awards.

=== Honours ===
As is traditional for a new Attorney General:

- She was sworn in as a member of Her Majesty's Most Honourable Privy Council on 19 February 2020 at Buckingham Palace, entitling her to the honorific prefix "The Right Honourable".
- She was appointed as Queen's Counsel on 24 February 2020, during the Queen's reign and she is now a King's Counsel.

== Notes ==
Parliament of the United Kingdom
Preceded by Mark Hoban	Member of parliament for Fareham; 2015–present	Incumbent
Party political offices
New office	Deputy Chair of the European Research Group; 2016–2017; Served alongside: Michael Tomlinson	Succeeded by Michael Tomlinson
Preceded by Steve Baker	Chair of the European Research Group; 2017–2018	Succeeded by Jacob Rees-Mogg
Political offices
New office	Parliamentary Under-Secretary of State for Exiting the European Union; 2018	Succeeded by Kwasi Kwarteng
Preceded by Geoffrey Cox	Attorney General for England and Wales; 2020–2021	Succeeded by Michael Ellis
Preceded by Geoffrey Cox	Advocate General for Northern Ireland; 2020–2021	Succeeded by Michael Ellis
Preceded by Michael Ellis	Attorney General for England and Wales; 2021–2022	Succeeded by Michael Ellis
Preceded by Michael Ellis	Advocate General for Northern Ireland; 2021–2022	Succeeded by Michael Ellis
Preceded by Priti Patel	Home Secretary; 2022	Succeeded by Grant Shapps
Preceded by Grant Shapps	Home Secretary; 2022–2023	Succeeded by James Cleverly
