= Peter Saunders (British sociologist) =

British sociologist

Peter Robert Saunders (born 1950) is a British sociologist.

He was born in Croydon and educated at Selhurst Grammar School for Boys. He gained a BA in sociology from the University of Kent, and a PhD from Chelsea College, while also acting as a research officer at the University of Essex.

In 1976 he joined the University of Sussex, becoming professor of sociology in 1988. He was research manager at the Australian Institute of Family Studies from 1999 to 2000, and then social research director at the Centre for Independent Studies, a libertarian think tank, from 2001 to 2008. In 2008 he returned to the UK, where he is now working as an independent social research consultant and fiction writer.

== Selected publications ==
- The Rise of the Equalities Industry (2011, ISBN 978-1-906837-33-4).
- When Prophecy Fails (2011, ISBN 978-1-864321-76-0)
- Beware False Prophets (2010, ISBN 978-1-906097-78-3)
- Social Mobility Myths (2010, ISBN 978-1-906837-14-3)
- The Versailles Memorandum (2009, ISBN 978-1-4452-0690-5)
- Taxploitation: The Case for Income Tax Reform (edited 2006, ISBN 1-86432-114-8).
- Australia's Welfare Habit: And how to kick it (2004, ISBN 1-86432-092-3).
- A Self-Reliant Australia (2003, ISBN 1-86432-080-X).
- Poverty in Australia: Beyond the Rhetoric (2002, ISBN 1-86432-072-9).
- Social Foundations of a Free Society (2001, ISBN 1-86432-065-6).
- Unequal But Fair (1996, ISBN 0-255-36366-4).
- Capitalism: A Social Audit (1995, ISBN 0-335-19141-X).
- Privatization and Popular Capitalism (with Colin Harris, 1994, ISBN 0-335-15708-4).
- A Nation of Home Owners (1990 ISBN 0-04-445489-9).
- Social Class and Stratification (1990, ISBN 0-415-04125-2).
- Social Theory and the Urban Question (1981/1986, ISBN 0-09-164431-3).
- Urban Politics: A Sociological Interpretation (1979, ISBN 0-09-136970-3).
