= Hachi Darreh =

Hachi Darreh حاچي دره
- Village
- Location within Iran
- Coordinates: 36°33′19″N 45°51′20″E
- Country: Iran
- Province: West Azerbaijan
- County: Mahabad
- Bakhsh: Khalifan
- Rural District: Kani Bazar

Population (2006)
  - Total: 227
- Time zone: UTC+3:30 (IRST)
  - Summer (DST): UTC+4:30 (IRDT)

Hachi Darreh (Persian: حاچي دره, also Romanized as Ḩāchī Darreh; also known as Āchī Darreh and Ājī Darreh) is a village in Kani Bazar Rural District, Khalifan District, Mahabad County, West Azerbaijan Province, Iran. At the 2006 census, its population was 227, in 35 families.
