= Samira Hashi =

Somali-British model, social activist and community worker

Samira hashi
- Born: 1991 (age 34–35); Somalia
- Modeling information
- Height: 5 ft 11 in (1.80 m)
- Hair color: Black
- Eye color: Brown

Samira Hashi is a Somali-British model, social activist and community worker based in London.

== Career, activism and other ventures ==
Samira Hashi moved to Britain at the age of 3 with her mother Lul Musse and grandmother Faduma when the Somali civil war began. She began modelling at the age of 17 after being regularly stopped by modelling agencies. She has since been doing regular photo shoots, editorials, fashion shows, modelling campaigns and promotional runways. She is also involved in charity work. She was a winner of the 2011 Fashion4 Africa prize.

She was filmed in a documentary about her country of birth with BBC3. In the Film, she discusses the practice of Female Genital Mutilation (FGM), and other issues she claims are blighting Somalia. On her return to London, she began campaigning with Save the Children, to highlight such issues and said " I go into schools with a high number of Somali girls, and they always seem shocked that it is part of our history and culture. We need women to talk about their experiences, men to talk about their marital experiences, clerics to explain it is not linked to religion and doctors to talk about the problems it causes. Then things will change – when we discuss what FGM is really doing".

== See also ==
- Ayan Elmi
