= Social mobility in the United Kingdom =

Social mobility in the United Kingdom refers to the ability or inability of citizens of the UK to move from one socio-economic class to another. It is commonly divided into two types: intragenerational mobility, which concerns changes in an individual's social status during their lifetime, and intergenerational mobility, which measures changes in social status between parents and their children.

== Intragenerational Social Mobility in UK ==
Researchers analyzed data from the 1958 National Child Development Study (NCDS) and the 1970 British Cohort Study (BCS), highlighting patterns of social mobility and the factors influencing them across genders and cohorts.

According to the study, the patterns and trajectories of intragenerational mobility among males in the 1958 birth cohort are as follows :

1. Early Peak Service Trajectory (37%): About 25% of individuals held service-class jobs at age 24. This increased to 80% by age 30 and remained stable, with most reaching "occupational maturity" by age 35.
2. Decline Service Trajectory (24%): Many began in service-class jobs before age 30, but the proportion declined after age 40, reflecting downward mobility into the intermediate class.
3. Intermediate Trajectory (23%): Starting with a mix of intermediate and manual jobs, the share of intermediate-class workers steadily increased up to age 46, while manual work first became more common and then decreased.
4. Manual Trajectory (17%): Most participants remained in manual jobs throughout their careers, showing high job stability.

For females, the 1958 birth cohort (NCDS) revealed four occupational trajectories, notably reflecting changes in labor market participation:

1. Intermediate Trajectory (41%): Primarily in the intermediate class, with some women leaving the labor market.
2. Service-Intermediate Mix Trajectory (39%): The share of service-class jobs first declined and then increased, alongside periods of labor market exit and re-entry (often related to childcare).
3. Upward Intermediate-Service Trajectory (12%): A steady upward movement from intermediate or manual occupations to the service class.
4. Manual Trajectory (8%): Predominantly manual occupations, with a decreasing share of intermediate-class jobs.

For males in the 1970 birth cohort (BCS), the number of occupational trajectories decreased to three, reflecting higher early-career stability:

1. Service Trajectory (49%): Predominantly service-class occupations, representing the advantaged pathway.
2. Manual-Intermediate Trajectory (35%): A mix of manual and intermediate class jobs.
3. Intermediate Trajectory (16%): Primarily intermediate-class occupations.

For females in the 1970 birth cohort (BCS), three occupational trajectories were identified, with more stable labor market participation:

1. Intermediate Trajectory (47%): Mainly intermediate-class occupations, with a significant number of women leaving the labor market.
2. Manual-Intermediate Trajectory (27%): A mix of manual and intermediate class jobs.
3. Service Trajectory (26%): Predominantly service-class jobs, with some downward mobility into the intermediate class.

=== Influencing factors ===
Social class of origin played a major role, with children from service-class families more likely to follow advantaged trajectories, while those from manual-class families were more concentrated in manual or declining pathways. For example, among NCDS males, 59% of those from service-class families entered the Early Peak Service Trajectory, compared to only 30% from manual-class families. Ability, measured by standardised test scores, also increased the likelihood of entering advantaged trajectories; in NCDS males, a one standard deviation increase in ability was associated with an odds ratio of 2.28 for entering the Early Peak Service Trajectory. Effort, assessed by academic motivation, was linked to avoiding manual trajectories, though its effect was weaker than that of ability and social origin and sometimes counterintuitive (for example, individuals in advantaged trajectories did not always report higher effort). Education, particularly higher education, significantly improved the chances of entering advantaged trajectories, with an especially strong effect for women from manual-class backgrounds.

== Intergenerational Social Mobility in UK ==
Core Patterns

The influence of social class of origin remained persistent across generations. Family social class shaped children’s occupational trajectories by transmitting resources such as education and social capital. For example, among BCS males, 66% of those from service-class families entered the Service Trajectory, compared to only 34% from manual-class families.

Cohort differences also emerged. Intergenerational effects appeared stronger in the 1970 birth cohort (BCS) than in the 1958 cohort (NCDS). The proportion of service-class family children entering advantaged trajectories increased from 59% in NCDS to 66% in BCS, suggesting that the impact of family background on occupational advantage may have intensified among younger generations.

Contributing Factors

Social origin remained the key determinant of initial occupational position and long-term trajectory. Its influence could not be fully offset by individual attributes. Even after controlling for ability and education, children from service-class families had a significantly higher likelihood of entering advantaged trajectories. For instance, among NCDS females, the odds ratio for manual-class family children entering the Early Peak Service Trajectory was only 0.28, substantially lower than for service-class families.

Individual attributes—including ability, effort, and education—interacted with social origin. Ability and education partially mediated the effects of family background but could not eliminate intergenerational disparities. For example, among BCS males, the impact of ability weakened while the importance of social class increased, possibly reflecting labor market shifts such as a growing reliance on social networks after the 1980s.

Labor market structure also played a role. Different industries valued merit to varying degrees. High-tech sectors tended to emphasise education and ability, while traditional industries often relied more heavily on social networks.

In the UK, social mobility has been a central topic in sociological research, particularly following the influential studies led by David Glass (1954), which helped establish key methodological frameworks. Multiple factors influence social mobility, including education, occupational structure, family background, marriage patterns, and social policy. Among these, education is frequently cited as a crucial driver, though access to educational opportunities remains uneven. Family origin and the availability of social capital also play significant roles in shaping individual mobility trajectories.

== Historical Research and Trends ==
Research on social mobility in the United Kingdom began in the mid-20th century, as sociologists examined changes in occupational status between fathers and sons to understand both the stability and shifts within the British social structure. Research by Berent and Glass indicated that while there is a degree of mobility within the British social structure, patterns of class reproduction remain pronounced. Approximately one-third of men were found to occupy the same social class as their fathers. The highest levels of intergenerational continuity were observed within the upper classes, particularly among professionals and managerial workers, where self-replication was most prevalent. In contrast, the descendants of skilled and routine manual workers exhibited greater mobility, representing the most fluid segment of the population.

By the 1980s, the focus of social mobility research in the UK had expanded beyond the straightforward description of occupational mobility rates. Scholars increasingly examined the role of the education system, gender, class structure, and social policy in shaping mobility patterns. Payne noted that the field had evolved into a set of diverse sub-disciplines, encompassing areas such as statistical modeling, class theory, and cross-national comparisons. Researchers began to emphasise that social mobility is not only a subject of study but also a lens through which to understand structural inequality.

Although the welfare state aimed to promote equal opportunities through educational access, numerous studies indicated that intergenerational transmission of social status remained pronounced in British society. Overall, the class structure showed a tendency toward stability.

Social mobility in the UK is shaped by a combination of structural and individual factors. These elements influence the likelihood of upward mobility for individuals while also reflecting broader patterns of class reproduction within British society. Sociological research has highlighted several key drivers of social mobility.

== Drivers of Social Mobility ==
=== Education ===
In sociological studies of social mobility, education is widely regarded as a central factor. According to Breen and Jonsson, education affects social mobility through two distinct mechanisms. The first is equalisation, which means reducing the influence of class background on educational attainment, weakening the link between social origin and occupational status. The second mechanism is known as the compositional effect. This occurs when expanded access to higher education leads to a greater proportion of highly educated individuals, among whom the connection between social origin and occupational outcomes is typically weaker. For this compositional effect to work, there must exist a pattern called differential association, meaning social origins matter less at higher education levels—a phenomenon confirmed in studies of France, Sweden, and Germany. Thus, beyond promoting educational equality, educational expansion itself can independently enhance social mobility.

However, research by Goldthorpe indicates that despite significant changes in the occupational structure of the UK in the latter half of the 20th century, relative mobility between social classes remained largely stable over several decades. He argues that the expansion of education has not substantially weakened the influence of social origin on individual outcomes. Although more people have gained access to higher education, the effects of credential inflation and increased social competition have limited education’s role as a mediator of social status.

As a result, while educational expansion did occur in the UK, it did not lead to a marked equalisation of opportunity. Compared to countries such as Germany and Sweden, improvements in social mobility have been less pronounced.

=== Gender and Ethnicity ===
From the 1970s to the early 1990s, British society exhibited notable gender differences in class mobility. Research done by Goldthorpe shows that men's upward mobility stalled or slightly declined due to the erosion of manufacturing and skilled manual jobs, compelling many men to accept lower-status positions, thus limiting their mobility. Women, however, experienced gradual improvements, notably increasing representation in professional, managerial, and administrative roles. Yet this progress was insufficient to counterbalance the overall trend of downward mobility driven by economic restructuring. Additionally, women's increased mobility often reflected employment instability, as intermittent career interruptions due to family responsibilities frequently resulted in downward occupational shifts upon re-entry into the labor market.

Further research emphasises the critical role of social capital — both formal (participation in civic organisations) and informal (social networks) — in facilitating or hindering social mobility. Using the "Position Generator" method, the study revealed deep-rooted class differences: the service class consistently possessed more extensive and higher-status social networks compared to the working class. These networks provided "bridging" capital that enhanced their social mobility. Importantly, social capital exhibited strong intergenerational continuity, reinforcing class advantages across generations. Women and ethnic minorities were found to have smaller and less diverse social networks, predominantly confined within lower-status groups. Their limited involvement was often restricted to religious or ethnically based associations, rarely extending to broader civic participation. This lack of bridging social capital significantly disadvantaged these groups in social mobility pathways, exacerbating existing inequalities.

Both studies emphasise that gender and ethnicity are key determinants of social mobility.

=== political policy ===
In 2011, the Coalition Government published its Social Mobility Strategy, which made it clear that social mobility is what the Government emphasises as "fairness" to counterbalance its austerity measures. However, the Coalition Government's definition of social mobility is narrower, focusing more on 'relative mobility' and emphasising fairness in terms of the opportunities for individuals to compete in the marketplace, while neglecting the structural upgrading of the economy as a whole and the importance of 'absolute mobility'. A series of policies implemented by the coalition government, such as cutting child tax credits, increasing tuition fees for higher education and promoting the marketisation of education, may actually lead to a further increase in social inequality and reduce social mobility.

Specifically, the New Labour government has highly integrated social mobility policies with national competitiveness. They emphasise the upgrading of the overall economic structure through the enhancement of individual skills and aspirations, thus enabling the UK to gain a favorable position in global economic competition. However, New Labour's actual promotion of social mobility has focused more on activation, i.e., promoting the re-employment of the unemployed, with limited effort on actual skills training and economic structural transformation of workers. Moreover, even where New Labour has implemented policies of a social protection nature, such as reducing child poverty, these initiatives have been framed in terms of promoting labor market participation, with the goal of social justice often taking a back seat to the demands of economic competition.

== Social Mobility and Regional Differences ==
Breen and In (2024) research suggests that there are significant differences in social mobility between different parts of the UK, but rather than being widely and evenly distributed, these differences are characterised by a small number of areas that are significantly higher or lower than the national average, creating what are known as ‘hot spots’ and ‘cold spots’ of social mobility. Specifically, social mobility is significantly higher in London as a whole than in other areas; but even within London, smaller local areas show significant differences, with some areas remaining less mobile. In addition, in terms of North-South differences, the South of England as a whole is generally more socially mobile than the North.

The study also found that such regional differences in social mobility are likely to be related to differences in the structure of class origins between regions. The relatively high proportion of working class (salariat) origins in the South of England is significantly associated with regional differences in educational attainment: the higher the proportion of working class origins, the higher the proportion of residents with advanced degrees. Nevertheless, this phenomenon is more a ‘selection effect’ due to differences in social background at the individual or family level than a feature of the region itself. Therefore, in understanding regional differences in social mobility, it is important to pay particular attention to regional differences in the distribution of individual and family social backgrounds, rather than relying on the characteristics of the region itself.

== See also ==
- Social mobility
- Economic history of the United Kingdom
- Income in the United Kingdom
- North–South divide in the United Kingdom
- Three-component theory of stratification
