= Lee Elliot Major =

British sociologist

Lee Elliot Major OBE is Professor of Social Mobility at the University of Exeter, Britain's first professor in the field. His work is dedicated to improving the prospects of people from disadvantaged backgrounds and tackling barriers to opportunity in education and the workplace.

== Early life and education ==
He grew up in Feltham, west London, and lived in a shared house on social security after his parents split up. He worked as a dustman and street cleaner for a summer. He attended Isleworth and Syon School and Richmond upon Thames College. He gained a BSc in physics and PhD in theoretical physics at the University of Sheffield, and an MSc Science Communication at Imperial College, London, in 1994.

== Books ==
His book Social Mobility and Its Enemies (2018), written with Stephen Machin, documents the problem of Britain's low social mobility. In his TEDx talk in 2019, Major describes an "escalating arms race of education" in which the poorest children are increasingly ill-equipped to fight.

In their follow-up book What Do We Know and What Should We Do About Social Mobility? (2020), Major and Machin argue that the COVID-19 pandemic will widen education and economic inequalities.

Major's book What Works? (2019), written with Steve Higgins, a professor of education at Durham University, provides best bets to teachers for improving outcomes for disadvantaged pupils. It extends the work of Major and Higgins as co-authors of the original Sutton Trust-EEF toolkit. Major advocates an approach to teaching that is informed by evidence.

In Equity in Education (2023), Major challenges deficit-based approaches and class biases in schools, arguing for a new approach focused on identifying and removing barriers to learning in schools. The Equity Scorecard offers a practical toolkit for school leaders.

In Cracking the Class Code (2026), Major explores the hidden class barriers that shape progression in top-tier global firms and sets out a practical blueprint for identifying and developing talent in elite workplaces.

== Career ==
Major was an education journalist working for The Guardian, The Times Higher Education Supplement, and Research Fortnight. He was Director of Policy at the Wellcome Trust between 2002 and 2004.

In 2006 he joined the Sutton Trust becoming its first Chief Executive in 2014. From 2011 to 2019 he was a trustee of the Education Endowment Foundation. He was co-author of What Makes Great Teaching.

Appointed as a professor of practice at the University of Exeter's Graduate School of Education in 2019, he is focused on the impact of research, working closely with school leaders, universities, employers and policy makers. He regularly features in the national media. He argues that social mobility is about securing decent jobs in local communities not just catapulting a lucky few to the top. He has warned that there will be a 'clash of classes' as students compete for elite university places. He also helped establish the South-West Social Mobility Commission and developed a university tutoring model in which undergraduates receive degree credit for supporting local school pupils.

He was previously an associate member of Nuffield College, University of Oxford, an associate of LSE's Centre for Economic Performance, a visiting fellow at the LSE's International Inequalities Institute, and an honorary professor at the UCL Institute of Education and serves on the Strategic Advisory Network of the Economic and Social Research Council. He is a Fellow of the Academy of Social Sciences.

He previously served as a governor at William Ellis School, and is a trustee of the Ted Wragg Trust.

== Honours ==
He was appointed OBE in the 2019 Queen's Birthday Honours for services to social mobility.

In 2017, he was awarded an honorary doctorate from the University of Sheffield for services to education.
