= Harpalus hatchi =

Scientific classification
- Kingdom: Animalia
- Phylum: Arthropoda
- Class: Insecta
- Order: Coleoptera
- Suborder: Adephaga
- Family: Carabidae
- Genus: Harpalus
- Species: H. hatchi

Binomial name
- Harpalus hatchi Ball & Anderson, 1962

Species of beetle

Harpalus hatchi is a species of ground beetle in the subfamily Harpalinae. It was described by Ball & Anderson in 1962.
