= Waberi Hachi =

Djiboutian footballer

Personal information
- Date of birth: April 16, 1981 (age 45)
- Position: Defender

International career
Years	Team	Apps	(Gls)
2008–2009	Djibouti	4	(0)

Waberi Hachi (born 16 April 1981 in Djibouti) is a footballer for the Djiboutian soccer team.

Hachi made his international senior debut against Malawi on May 31, 2008. He was part of the Djibouti squad for 2010 FIFA World Cup qualification.
