= No5 Chambers =

Barristers' chambers in England

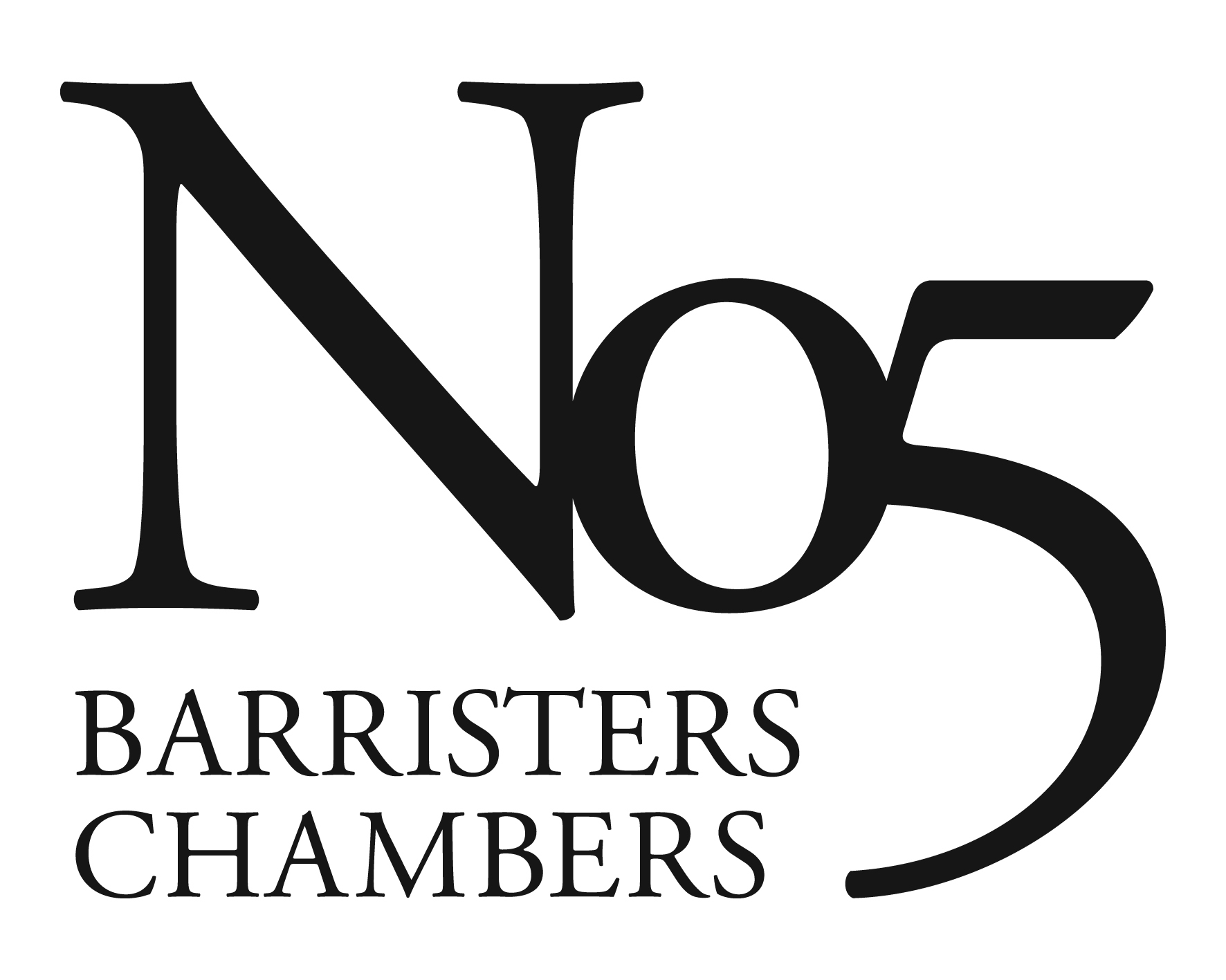
No5 Barristers' Chambers logo

No5 Barristers' Chambers is one of the largest sets of barristers' chambers in the United Kingdom, located in Birmingham, with offices in London and Bristol.

== Locations ==
No5 Barristers' Chambers' hub is in central Birmingham, at 103 Colmore Row. The second office is located in Savoy Court, near the Strand in the City of London. The third office is in Queen Square.

== Members ==
Over 260 barristers are listed at No5 Barristers' Chambers, including 40 of the King's Counsel, colloquially referenced as "silks", practising across all areas of law.

No5 Barristers' Chambers has expertise across the full spectrum of law including Business and Property, Clinical Negligence, Costs and Litigation Funding, Court of Protection, Credit Hire, Crime, Education Law, Employment, Family, Immigration, Asylum and Nationality, Inquests, Public Inquiries and Coronial Law, International Human Rights, Mediation & Alternative Dispute Resolution, Personal Injury, Planning and Environment, Prison and Police Law, Public Law and Regulatory.

The current Heads of Chambers are Michelle Heeley KC and Peter Goatley KC. Heads of Groups include Richard Kimblin KC, Mark Heywood KC, Mohammad Zaman KC, Henry Pitchers KC, Danny Bazini, Mugni Islam-Choudhury and Richard Hadley who along with many other members of chambers, each of whom are noted for their work by both The Legal 500 and Chambers and Partners.
