= Breckland District Council elections =

Local government elections in Norfolk, England

Breckland District Council in Norfolk, England, is elected every four years.

== Council elections ==
- 1973 Breckland District Council election
- 1976 Breckland District Council election
- 1979 Breckland District Council election (New ward boundaries)
- 1983 Breckland District Council election
- 1987 Breckland District Council election
- 1991 Breckland District Council election (District boundary changes took place but the number of seats remained the same)
- 1995 Breckland District Council election
- 1999 Breckland District Council election
- 2003 Breckland District Council election (New ward boundaries)
- 2007 Breckland District Council election
- 2011 Breckland District Council election
- 2015 Breckland District Council election (New ward boundaries)
- 2019 Breckland District Council election
- 2023 Breckland District Council election

For by-election results, please see the page on Breckland District Council By-elections.

== Council composition ==
Composition of the council
| Year | Conservative | Labour | Liberal Democrats (Note: Includes totals for the predecessors of the Liberal Democrats, the Liberal Party and SDP (both of which participated in the Alliance).) | Green | UKIP | Independents & Others | Council control after election |
|---|---|---|---|---|---|---|---|
Local government reorganisation; council established (51 seats)
| 1973 | 20 | 10 | 0 | – | – | 21 | No overall control |
| 1976 | 23 | 9 | 0 | 0 | – | 19 | No overall control |
New ward boundaries (53 seats)
| 1979 | 31 | 6 | 0 | 0 | – | 16 | Conservative |
| 1983 | 32 | 8 | 1 | 0 | – | 12 | Conservative |
| 1987 | 33 | 7 | 2 | 0 | – | 11 | Conservative |
| 1991 | 32 | 8 | 1 | 0 | – | 12 | Conservative |
| 1995 | 19 | 25 | 1 | 1 | 0 | 7 | No overall control |
| 1999 | 34 | 14 | 2 | 0 | 0 | 3 | Conservative |
New ward boundaries (54 seats)
| 2003 | 42 | 8 | 0 | 0 | 0 | 4 | Conservative |
| 2007 | 48 | 3 | 0 | 0 | 0 | 3 | Conservative |
| 2011 | 47 | 4 | 0 | 0 | 0 | 3 | Conservative |
New ward boundaries (49 seats)
| 2015 | 42 | 2 | 0 | 0 | 4 | 1 | Conservative |
| 2019 | 37 | 6 | 0 | 2 | 0 | 4 | Conservative |
| 2023 | 30 | 12 | 1 | 1 | 0 | 5 | Conservative |

== Maps ==
=== Results maps ===
1979 results map

1983 results map

1987 results map

1991 results map

1995 results map

1999 results map

2003 results map

2007 results map

2011 results map

2015 results map

2019 results map

2023 results map

== By-election results ==
A by-election occurs when seats become vacant between council elections. Below is a summary of by-elections from 1983 onwards. Full by-election results are listed under the last regular election preceding the by-election and can be found by clicking on the ward name.

=== 1983-1994 ===
| Ward | Date | Incumbent party | Winning party |
|---|---|---|---|
| Nar Valley | 17 December 1987 | Labour | Labour |
| Haverscroft | 4 May 1989 | Conservative | Conservative |
| Thetford Saxon | 4 May 1989 | Labour | Labour |
| Peddars Way | 10 May 1990 | Conservative | Conservative |
| Watton | 9 September 1993 | Conservative | Liberal Democrats |

=== 1995-2006 ===
| Ward | Date | Incumbent party | Winning party |
|---|---|---|---|
| Eynsford | 6 February 1997 | Labour | Labour |
| Hermitage | 14 August 1997 | Labour | Labour |
| Conifer | 4 December 1997 | Labour | Conservative |
| Upper Wensum | 26 March 1998 | Labour | Conservative |
| Thetford Guildhall | 9 July 1998 | Labour | Conservative |
| Thetford Barnham Cross | 8 March 2001 | Labour | Labour |
| East Dereham Town | 28 June 2001 | Labour | Liberal Democrats |
| Swaffham | 22 June 2006 | Conservative | Conservative |

=== 2007-2018 ===
| Ward | Date | Incumbent party | Winning party |
|---|---|---|---|
| Queens | 4 June 2009 | Conservative | Conservative |
| Queens | 19 July 2012 | Conservative | Conservative |
| Mid Forest | 26 July 2012 | Conservative | Conservative |
| Harling & Heathlands | 26 July 2012 | Conservative | Conservative |
| Thetford - Abbey | 13 September 2012 | Independent | Labour |
| Attleborough Queens & Besthorpe | 5 May 2016 | Conservative | Conservative |
| Saham Toney | 16 March 2017 | Conservative | Conservative |
| Harling & Heathlands | 4 May 2017 | Conservative | Conservative |
| Thetford Priory | 28 September 2017 | Conservative | Labour |

=== 2019-present ===
| Ward | Date | Incumbent party | Winning party |
|---|---|---|---|
| Hermitage | 2 December 2021 | Conservative | Conservative |
| Mattishall | 9 June 2022 | Conservative | Conservative |
| Thetford Boudica | 14 July 2022 | Conservative | Labour |
| Hermitage | 2 May 2024 | Liberal Democrats | Conservative |
| Bedingfeld | 27 February 2025 | Conservative | Reform |
| Thetford Priory | 1 May 2025 | Labour | Reform |
| Thetford Castle | 24 September 2025 | Labour | Reform |
| Dereham Toftwood | 16 July 2026 | Labour | Conservative |
