= 1999 Breckland District Council election =

Breckland District Council election

- 6 May 1999

All 53 seats to Breckland District Council 27 seats needed for a majority

	First party	Second party	Third party
Party	Conservative	Labour	Independent
Seats won	34	14	3
Seat change	▲16	▼11	▼4
Popular vote	17,527	11,753	1,905
Percentage	46.2%	31.0%	5.0%
Swing	▲16.8%	▼12.2%	▼8.2%
	Fourth party	Fifth party
Party	Liberal Democrats	Green
Seats won	2	0
Seat change	Steady	▼1
Popular vote	5,608	1,137
Percentage	14.8%	3.0%
Swing	▲2.2%	▲1.2%
- Winner of each seat at the 1999 Breckland District Council election.
Control before election
No overall control
Control after election
Conservative

The 1999 Breckland District Council election took place on 6 May 1999 to elect members of Breckland District Council in England. This was on the same day as other local elections.

== Summary ==
=== Election result ===
1999 Breckland District Council election
Party	Candidates	Seats	Gains	Losses	Net gain/loss	Seats %	Votes %	Votes	+/−
Conservative	47	34	16	0	▲16	64.2	46.2	17,527	+16.8
Labour	36	14	0	11	▼11	26.4	31.0	11,753	–12.1
Independent	8	3	1	5	▼4	5.7	5.0	1,905	–8.2
Liberal Democrats	26	2	0	0	Steady	3.8	14.8	5,608	+2.2
Green	11	0	0	1	▼1	0.0	3.0	1,137	+1.2
Ind. Lib Dem	1	0	0	0	Steady	0.0	0.1	36	N/A

== Ward results ==
Incumbent councillors standing for re-election are marked with an asterisk (*). Changes in seats do not take into account by-elections or defections.

=== All Saints ===
All Saints
Party	Candidate	Votes	%	±%
Conservative	W. Smith	Unopposed		
Registered electors		1,579		
Conservative hold				

=== Beetley & Gressenhall ===
Beetley & Gressenhall
Party	Candidate	Votes	%	±%
Conservative	R. Duffield	392	42.2	
Independent	R. Richmond	239	25.8	
Labour	T. Johnson	237	25.5	
Green	A. Keidan	60	6.5	
Majority		153	16.5	
Turnout		929	50.0	
Registered electors		1,857		
Conservative gain from Labour		Swing		

=== Besthorpe ===
Besthorpe
Party	Candidate	Votes	%	±%
Conservative	K. Martin*	Unopposed		
Registered electors		2,033		
Conservative hold				

=== Buckenham ===
Buckenham
Party	Candidate	Votes	%	±%
Conservative	A. Joel*	546	76.3	
Labour	H. Fraser	120	16.8	
Liberal Democrats	C. Lloyd	50	7.0	
Majority		426	59.5	
Turnout		716	55.0	
Registered electors		1,321		
Conservative hold		Swing		

=== Conifer ===
Conifer
Party	Candidate	Votes	%	±%
Conservative	H. Van Cutsem	Unopposed		
Registered electors		1,918		
Conservative gain from Labour				

=== East Dereham Neatherd ===
East Dereham Neatherd (2 seats)
Party	Candidate	Votes	%	±%
Labour	R. Goreham*	414	31.3	
Conservative	L. Monument	401	30.4	
Green	T. Park*	396	30.0	
Conservative	J. Gretton	367	27.8	
Liberal Democrats	E. Blane	348	26.3	
Labour	C. Thorne	257	19.5	
Liberal Democrats	E. Conway	216	16.4	
Independent	S. Brown	118	8.9	
Turnout		~1,321	41.0	
Registered electors		3,223		
Labour hold				
Conservative gain from Green				

=== East Dereham St. Withburga ===
East Dereham St. Withburga
Party	Candidate	Votes	%	±%
Labour	L. Goreham	231	39.8	
Conservative	S. Dorrington	166	28.6	
Independent	G. Barnard	103	17.8	
Green	A. Bowyer	44	7.6	
Ind. Lib Dem	S. Blane	36	6.2	
Majority		65	11.2	
Turnout		580	32.0	
Registered electors		1,813		
Labour hold		Swing		

=== East Dereham Toftwood ===
East Dereham Toftwood (2 seats)
Party	Candidate	Votes	%	±%
Labour	W. Sheath*	447	36.9	
Conservative	P. Duigan	368	30.4	
Labour	M. Hodson*	363	30.0	
Independent	J. Barnes	323	26.7	
Conservative	J. Cheetham	323	26.7	
Independent	M. Mann	230	19.0	
Liberal Democrats	B. Shelley	94	7.8	
Green	T. Birt	72	5.9	
Liberal Democrats	E. Cornish	70	5.8	
Turnout		~1,212	28.0	
Registered electors		4,328		
Labour hold				
Conservative gain from Labour				

=== East Dereham Town ===
East Dereham Town (2 seats)
Party	Candidate	Votes	%	±%
Labour	L. Potter*	374	48.8	
Labour	M. Fanthorpe	358	46.7	
Conservative	S. Bambridge	249	32.5	
Conservative	M. Griffin	190	24.8	
Liberal Democrats	P. Kane	123	16.0	
Liberal Democrats	A. Donovan	86	11.2	
Green	D. Bowyer	73	9.5	
Turnout		~767	35.0	
Registered electors		2,191		
Labour hold				
Labour hold				

=== East Guiltcross ===
East Guiltcross
Party	Candidate	Votes	%	±%
Conservative	J. Baskerville	Unopposed		
Registered electors		1,314		
Conservative gain from Labour				

=== Eynsford ===
Eynsford
Party	Candidate	Votes	%	±%
Labour	J. Mallen	415	62.6	
Conservative	D. Ashford	248	37.4	
Majority		167	25.2	
Turnout		663	47.0	
Registered electors		1,433		
Labour hold		Swing		

=== Haggard De Toni ===
Haggard De Toni
Party	Candidate	Votes	%	±%
Liberal Democrats	G. Lockyear*	366	57.0	
Conservative	M. Spaul	276	43.0	
Majority		90	14.0	
Turnout		642	38.0	
Registered electors		1,722		
Liberal Democrats hold		Swing		

=== Harling ===
Harling
Party	Candidate	Votes	%	±%
Conservative	R. Kemp	433	54.1	
Labour	A. Hanson*	367	45.9	
Majority		66	8.3	
Turnout		800	47.7	
Registered electors		1,694		
Conservative gain from Labour		Swing		

=== Haverscroft ===
Haverscroft
Party	Candidate	Votes	%	±%
Conservative	A. Stasiak*	Unopposed		
Registered electors		1,663		
Conservative hold				

=== Heathlands ===
Heathlands
Party	Candidate	Votes	%	±%
Conservative	J. Wright*	392	68.4	
Labour	D. Griffith	116	20.2	
Liberal Democrats	J. Myhill	65	11.3	
Majority		276	48.2	
Turnout		573	38.0	
Registered electors		1,536		
Conservative hold		Swing		

=== Hermitage ===
Hermitage
Party	Candidate	Votes	%	±%
Labour	C. Holland	465	60.5	
Conservative	J. Birkbeck	277	36.1	
Green	J. Thompson	26	3.4	
Majority		188	24.5	
Turnout		768	62.0	
Registered electors		1,251		
Labour hold		Swing		

=== Launditch ===
Launditch
Party	Candidate	Votes	%	±%
Conservative	R. Gould	364	55.0	
Labour	J. Farrell	298	45.0	
Majority		66	10.0	
Turnout		662	47.0	
Registered electors		1,427		
Conservative gain from Independent		Swing		

=== Mattishall ===
Mattishall
Party	Candidate	Votes	%	±%
Conservative	B. Rose*	533	71.0	
Labour	J. Doyle	218	29.0	
Majority		315	41.9	
Turnout		751	37.0	
Registered electors		2,051		
Conservative hold		Swing		

=== Mid Forest ===
Mid Forest
Party	Candidate	Votes	%	±%
Conservative	I. Monson*	391	91.4	
Liberal Democrats	S. Gordon	37	8.6	
Majority		354	82.7	
Turnout		428	43.8	
Registered electors		978		
Conservative hold		Swing		

=== Nar Valley ===
Nar Valley
Party	Candidate	Votes	%	±%
Conservative	D. Williams	361	56.9	
Labour	P. Crate	274	43.1	
Majority		87	13.7	
Turnout		635	38.0	
Registered electors		1,710		
Conservative gain from Labour		Swing		

=== Necton ===
Necton
Party	Candidate	Votes	%	±%
Conservative	N. Wilkin*	Unopposed		
Registered electors		1,463		
Conservative hold				

=== Peddars Way ===
Peddars Way
Party	Candidate	Votes	%	±%
Conservative	D. Foster*	349	69.7	
Liberal Democrats	N. John	152	30.3	
Majority		197	39.3	
Turnout		501	32.0	
Registered electors		1,611		
Conservative hold		Swing		

=== Queens ===
Queens
Party	Candidate	Votes	%	±%
Conservative	P. Francis	546	55.5	
Labour	R. Smith	285	29.0	
Liberal Democrats	C. Saville	152	15.5	
Majority		261	26.6	
Turnout		983	25.0	
Registered electors		3,921		
Conservative gain from Labour		Swing		

=== Shipworth ===
Shipworth
Party	Candidate	Votes	%	±%
Conservative	A. Matthews*	369	60.6	
Labour	P. Terry	183	30.0	
Green	J. Curtis	57	9.4	
Majority		186	30.5	
Turnout		609	32.0	
Registered electors		1,928		
Conservative gain from Independent		Swing		

=== Springvale ===
Springvale
Party	Candidate	Votes	%	±%
Conservative	J. Howell	453	53.9	
Labour	R. Baldwin	273	32.5	
Green	J. Park	115	13.7	
Majority		180	21.4	
Turnout		841	30.0	
Registered electors		2,798		
Conservative gain from Labour		Swing		

=== Swaffham ===
Swaffham (3 seats)
Party	Candidate	Votes	%	±%
Conservative	S. Matthews*	1,057	55.8	
Conservative	I. Sherwood	814	43.0	
Conservative	P. Darby	782	41.3	
Labour	P. Buxton	701	37.0	
Liberal Democrats	D. Cannon	548	28.9	
Independent	P. Green	537	28.4	
Turnout		~1,894	37.0	
Registered electors		5,119		
Conservative hold				
Conservative gain from Independent				
Conservative gain from Independent				

=== Swanton Morley ===
Swanton Morley
Party	Candidate	Votes	%	±%
Independent	J. Carrick*	355	50.5	
Labour	I. Fincham	164	23.3	
Green	T. Montgomery	150	21.3	
Majority		191	27.2	
Turnout		703	48.0	
Registered electors		1,464		
Independent hold		Swing		

=== Taverner ===
Taverner
Party	Candidate	Votes	%	±%
Conservative	J. Labouchere*	439	73.9	
Labour	B. Macann	156	26.3	
Majority		283	47.6	
Turnout		594	50.0	
Registered electors		1,188		
Conservative hold		Swing		

=== Templar ===
Templar
Party	Candidate	Votes	%	±%
Conservative	J. Rogers*	218	65.3	
Liberal Democrats	M. John	109	32.6	
Majority		109	32.7	
Turnout		334	29.0	
Registered electors		1,151		
Conservative hold		Swing		

=== Thetford Abbey ===
Thetford Abbey (2 seats)
Party	Candidate	Votes	%	±%
Labour	T. Paines*	448	67.7	
Labour	A. Paines*	394	59.5	
Liberal Democrats	K. Short	223	33.7	
Turnout		~662	20.4	
Registered electors		3,243		
Labour hold				
Labour hold				

=== Thetford Barnham Cross ===
Thetford Barnham Cross (2 seats)
Party	Candidate	Votes	%	±%
Labour	C. Armes*	542	67.8	
Labour	J. Bullock*	517	64.7	
Conservative	B. Skull	153	19.1	
Liberal Democrats	M. Amis	72	9.0	
Liberal Democrats	K. Holton	64	8.0	
Turnout		~799	30.0	
Registered electors		2,662		
Labour hold				
Labour hold				

=== Thetford Guildhall ===
Thetford Guildhall (3 seats)
Party	Candidate	Votes	%	±%
Independent	T. Lamb	673	42.3	
Conservative	D. Mortimer	572	35.9	
Labour	S. Armes	553	34.7	
Conservative	P. Spencer	461	29.0	
Conservative	D. Goveia	443	27.8	
Labour	R. Watson	416	26.1	
Labour	R. Key*	343	21.5	
Liberal Democrats	D. Jeffrey	303	19.0	
Liberal Democrats	M. Rouse	177	11.1	
Liberal Democrats	W. Thorne	150	9.4	
Turnout		~1,592	28.0	
Registered electors		5,686		
Independent gain from Labour				
Conservative gain from Labour				
Labour hold				

=== Thetford Saxon ===
Thetford Saxon (2 seats)
Party	Candidate	Votes	%	±%
Labour	J. Ramm	359	62.1	
Labour	D. Curzon-Berners*	290	50.2	
Conservative	J. Swaisland	178	30.8	
Liberal Democrats	R. Roost	116	20.1	
Turnout		~578	24.0	
Registered electors		2,410		
Labour hold				
Labour hold				

=== Two Rivers ===
Two Rivers
Party	Candidate	Votes	%	±%
Conservative	P. Claussen	377	64.9	
Labour	M. Delray	204	35.1	
Majority		173	29.8	
Turnout		581	35.0	
Registered electors		1,680		
Conservative hold		Swing		

=== Upper Wensum ===
Upper Wensum
Party	Candidate	Votes	%	±%
Conservative	C. Greenock	489	69.3	
Labour	R. Bartlett	160	22.7	
Green	J. Sammonds	57	8.1	
Majority		329	46.6	
Turnout		706	47.0	
Registered electors		1,519		
Conservative gain from Labour		Swing		

=== Upper Yare ===
Upper Yare
Party	Candidate	Votes	%	±%
Conservative	C. Jordan*	457	67.4	
Labour	C. Warman	134	19.8	
Green	A. Geddes	87	12.8	
Majority		323	47.6	
Turnout		678	44.0	
Registered electors		1,478		
Conservative hold		Swing		

=== Watton ===
Watton (3 seats)
Party	Candidate	Votes	%	±%
Conservative	R. Rudling*	829	52.0	
Liberal Democrats	K. Gilbert*	633	39.7	
Conservative	J. Bowyer*	595	37.3	
Liberal Democrats	J. Selvey	520	32.6	
Liberal Democrats	J. Glover	482	30.2	
Labour	J. Cannon	469	29.4	
Conservative	P. Darby	431	27.0	
Turnout		~1,594	34.0	
Registered electors		4,677		
Conservative hold				
Liberal Democrats hold				
Conservative hold				

=== Wayland ===
Wayland
Party	Candidate	Votes	%	±%
Conservative	G. Machorton*	410	80.4	
Liberal Democrats	K. John	100	19.6	
Majority		310	60.8	
Turnout		510	38.0	
Registered electors		1,352		
Conservative hold		Swing		

=== Weeting ===
Weeting
Party	Candidate	Votes	%	±%
Independent	S. Childerhouse*	Unopposed		
Registered electors		1,401		
Independent hold				

=== West Guiltcross ===
West Guiltcross
Party	Candidate	Votes	%	±%
Conservative	J. Nunn*	341	62.1	
Labour	D. Griffith	208	37.9	
Majority		133	24.2	
Turnout		549	38.0	
Registered electors		1,491		
Conservative gain from Independent		Swing		

=== Wissey ===
Wissey
Party	Candidate	Votes	%	±%
Conservative	J. Ball*	487	58.0	
Liberal Democrats	R. Lake	352	42.0	
Majority		135	16.1	
Turnout		839	43.0	
Registered electors		1,975		
Conservative hold		Swing		

== By-elections ==
=== Thetford Barnham Cross ===
Thetford Barnham Cross by-election: 8 March 2001
Party	Candidate	Votes	%	±%
Labour		281	58.3	
Conservative		163	33.8	
Liberal Democrats		38	7.9	
Majority		118	24.5	
Turnout		482	18.4	
Registered electors		2,620		
Labour hold		Swing		

=== East Dereham Town ===
East Dereham Town by-election: 28 June 2001
Party	Candidate	Votes	%	±%
Liberal Democrats		278	51.6	
Conservative		200	37.1	
Green		61	11.3	
Majority		78	14.5	
Turnout		539	25.0	
Registered electors		2,156		
Liberal Democrats gain from Labour		Swing		
