= 1995 Breckland District Council election =

Breckland District Council election

- 4 May 1995

All 53 seats to Breckland District Council 27 seats needed for a majority

	First party	Second party	Third party
Party	Labour	Conservative	Independent
Seats won	25	18	7
Seat change	▲17	▼14	▼5
Popular vote	19,983	13,624	6,112
Percentage	43.1%	29.4%	13.2%
Swing	▲15.2%	▼14.0%	▼8.7%
	Fourth party	Fifth party
Party	Liberal Democrats	Green
Seats won	2	1
Seat change	▲1	▲1
Popular vote	5,824	812
Percentage	12.6%	1.8%
Swing	▲9.3%	▲0.1%
- Winner of each seat at the 1995 Breckland District Council election.
Control before election
Conservative
Control after election
No overall control

The 1995 Breckland District Council election took place on 4 May 1995 to elect members of Breckland District Council in Norfolk, England. This was on the same day as other local elections.

== Summary ==
=== Election result ===
1995 Breckland District Council election
Party	Candidates	Seats	Gains	Losses	Net gain/loss	Seats %	Votes %	Votes	+/−
Labour	44	25	17	0	▲17	47.2	43.1	19,983	+15.2
Conservative	37	18	2	16	▼14	34.0	29.4	13,624	–14.0
Independent	17	7	0	5	▼5	13.2	13.2	6,112	–8.7
Liberal Democrats	23	2	2	1	▲1	3.8	12.6	5,824	+9.3
Green	7	1	1	0	▲1	1.9	1.8	812	+0.1

== Ward results ==
Incumbent councillors standing for re-election are marked with an asterisk (*). Changes in seats do not take into account by-elections or defections.

=== All Saints ===
All Saints
Party	Candidate	Votes	%	±%
Conservative	D. Wickham	312	50.1	
Labour	P. Ward	311	49.9	
Majority		1	0.2	
Turnout		623	40.2	
Registered electors		1,556		
Conservative hold		Swing		

=== Beetley & Gressenhall ===
Beetley & Gressenhall
Party	Candidate	Votes	%	±%
Labour	G. Davies	466	50.2	
Conservative	R. Shelton*	393	42.3	
Green	A. Keidan	69	7.4	
Majority		73	7.9	
Turnout		928	51.0	
Registered electors		1,829		
Labour gain from Conservative		Swing		

=== Besthorpe ===
Besthorpe
Party	Candidate	Votes	%	±%
Conservative	K. Martin*	424	52.1	
Labour	P. Taylor	302	37.1	
Liberal Democrats	S. Beedham	70	8.6	
Independent	A. Riccobena	18	2.2	
Majority		122	15.0	
Turnout		814	40.2	
Registered electors		2,033		
Conservative hold		Swing		

=== Buckenham ===
Buckenham
Party	Candidate	Votes	%	±%
Conservative	A. Joel	374	51.7	
Labour	D. Cornwall	350	48.3	
Majority		24	3.3	
Turnout		724	55.5	
Registered electors		1,302		
Conservative gain from Independent		Swing		

=== Conifer ===
Conifer
Party	Candidate	Votes	%	±%
Labour	P. Brooker	454	56.0	
Conservative	C. Boden	356	44.0	
Majority		98	12.1	
Turnout		810	42.0	
Registered electors		1,938		
Labour gain from Conservative		Swing		

=== East Dereham Neatherd ===
East Dereham Neatherd (2 seats)
Party	Candidate	Votes	%	±%
Labour	R. Goreham	548	38.4	
Green	T. Park	477	33.4	
Labour	C. Thorne	475	33.3	
Conservative	M. Fanthorpe*	419	29.4	
Conservative	M. Monument*	387	27.1	
Liberal Democrats	E. Blane	313	21.9	
Turnout		~1,427	46.0	
Registered electors		3,101		
Labour gain from Conservative				
Green gain from Conservative				

=== East Dereham St. Withburga ===
East Dereham St. Withburga
Party	Candidate	Votes	%	±%
Labour	G. Barnard	345	49.0	
Conservative	B. Cross	234	33.2	
Liberal Democrats	S. Dirdin	82	11.6	
Green	J. Park	43	6.1	
Majority		111	15.8	
Turnout		704	42.0	
Registered electors		1,683		
Labour gain from Conservative		Swing		

=== East Dereham Toftwood ===
East Dereham Toftwood (2 seats)
Party	Candidate	Votes	%	±%
Labour	W. Sheath	775	48.1	
Labour	M. Hodson	669	41.5	
Independent	J. Barnes	433	26.9	
Conservative	B. Roberts	368	22.8	
Conservative	C. Middleton	361	22.4	
Liberal Democrats	B. Shelley	330	20.5	
Turnout		~1,612	39.0	
Registered electors		4,133		
Labour gain from Conservative				
Labour gain from Conservative				

=== East Dereham Town ===
East Dereham Town (2 seats)
Party	Candidate	Votes	%	±%
Labour	L. Potter*	579	63.1	
Labour	R. Potter*	496	54.0	
Conservative	L. Monument	204	22.2	
Liberal Democrats	P. Kane	171	18.6	
Conservative	E. Dagg	150	16.3	
Green	J. Curtis	89	9.7	
Turnout		~918	40.0	
Registered electors		2,294		
Labour hold				
Labour hold				

=== East Guiltcross ===
East Guiltcross
Party	Candidate	Votes	%	±%
Labour	T. Bastable	283	52.8	
Conservative	A. Byrne*	253	47.2	
Majority		30	5.6	
Turnout		536	42.0	
Registered electors		1,278		
Labour gain from Conservative		Swing		

=== Eynsford ===
Eynsford
Party	Candidate	Votes	%	±%
Labour	J. George	293	54.6	
Conservative	P. Coston	244	45.4	
Majority		49	9.1	
Turnout		543	39.0	
Registered electors		1,391		
Labour gain from Independent		Swing		

=== Haggard De Toni ===
Haggard De Toni
Party	Candidate	Votes	%	±%
Liberal Democrats	G. Lockyear	316	42.8	
Conservative	R. Harrold	266	36.0	
Independent	J. Flowerdew	157	21.2	
Majority		50	6.8	
Turnout		739	46.0	
Registered electors		1,628		
Liberal Democrats gain from Conservative		Swing		

=== Harling ===
Harling
Party	Candidate	Votes	%	±%
Labour	A. Hanson	456	58.8	
Conservative	M. Mawby*	319	41.2	
Majority		137	17.7	
Turnout		775	48.2	
Registered electors		1,622		
Labour gain from Conservative		Swing		

=== Haverscroft ===
Haverscroft
Party	Candidate	Votes	%	±%
Conservative	A. Stasiak*	395	51.1	
Labour	J. William	378	48.9	
Majority		17	2.2	
Turnout		773	44.6	
Registered electors		1,733		
Conservative hold		Swing		

=== Heathlands ===
Heathlands
Party	Candidate	Votes	%	±%
Conservative	J. Wright*	286	49.2	
Liberal Democrats	S. Gordon	148	25.5	
Independent	G. Leigh	147	25.3	
Majority		138	23.8	
Turnout		581	41.5	
Registered electors		1,402		
Conservative hold		Swing		

=== Hermitage ===
Hermitage
Party	Candidate	Votes	%	±%
Labour	F. Taylor	346	51.3	
Independent	J. Birbeck*	303	44.9	
Green	S. Caputo	26	3.9	
Majority		43	6.4	
Turnout		675	56.0	
Registered electors		1,199		
Labour gain from Conservative		Swing		

=== Launditch ===
Launditch
Party	Candidate	Votes	%	±%
Independent	R. Butler-Stoney*	392	56.2	
Labour	C. Holland	305	43.8	
Majority		87	12.5	
Turnout		697	51.0	
Registered electors		1,365		
Independent hold		Swing		

=== Mattishall ===
Mattishall
Party	Candidate	Votes	%	±%
Conservative	B. Rose	473	53.8	
Labour	J. Doyle	406	46.2	
Majority		67	7.6	
Turnout		879	44.0	
Registered electors		2,005		
Conservative hold		Swing		

=== Mid Forest ===
Mid Forest
Party	Candidate	Votes	%	±%
Conservative	I. Monsoon*	267	50.5	
Liberal Democrats	R. Green	262	49.5	
Majority		5	0.9	
Turnout		529	47.5	
Registered electors		1,113		
Conservative hold		Swing		

=== Nar Valley ===
Nar Valley
Party	Candidate	Votes	%	±%
Labour	J. Boddy*	Unopposed		
Registered electors		1,761		
Labour hold				

=== Necton ===
Necton
Party	Candidate	Votes	%	±%
Conservative	N. Wilkin	361	54.2	
Labour	L. Buxton	305	45.8	
Majority		56	8.4	
Turnout		666	47.0	
Registered electors		1,408		
Conservative hold		Swing		

=== Peddars Way ===
Peddars Way
Party	Candidate	Votes	%	±%
Conservative	D. Foster*	312	53.4	
Labour	R. Wakeling	272	46.6	
Majority		40	6.8	
Turnout		584	38.0	
Registered electors		1,563		
Conservative hold		Swing		

=== Queens ===
Queens
Party	Candidate	Votes	%	±%
Labour	G. Maddern	587	51.4	
Conservative	P. Francis	554	48.6	
Majority		33	2.9	
Turnout		1,141	35.2	
Registered electors		3,285		
Labour gain from Conservative		Swing		

=== Shipworth ===
Shipworth
Party	Candidate	Votes	%	±%
Independent	A. Mathews*	412	54.0	
Labour	P. Terry	351	46.0	
Majority		61	8.0	
Turnout		763	40.0	
Registered electors		1,932		
Independent hold		Swing		

=== Springvale ===
Springvale
Party	Candidate	Votes	%	±%
Labour	R. Dicken	458	46.5	
Conservative	J. Mallon*	445	45.1	
Green	J. Sammonds	83	8.4	
Majority		13	1.3	
Turnout		986	37.0	
Registered electors		2,663		
Labour gain from Conservative		Swing		

=== Swaffham ===
Swaffham (3 seats)
Party	Candidate	Votes	%	±%
Conservative	S. Matthews*	897	41.7	
Independent	T. Wilding*	820	38.1	
Independent	J. Sampson*	756	35.1	
Labour	P. Buxton	712	33.1	
Independent	P. Green	604	28.1	
Labour	E. Johnson	579	26.9	
Independent	M. Knox	300	13.9	
Liberal Democrats	G. Bolton	245	11.4	
Liberal Democrats	J. Martin	149	6.9	
Turnout		~2,153	43.0	
Registered electors		5,008		
Conservative hold				
Independent hold				
Independent hold				

=== Swanton Morley ===
Swanton Morley
Party	Candidate	Votes	%	±%
Independent	J. Carrick*	405	66.2	
Labour	J. Copsey	207	33.8	
Majority		198	32.4	
Turnout		612	42.0	
Registered electors		1,530		
Independent hold		Swing		

=== Taverner ===
Taverner
Party	Candidate	Votes	%	±%
Conservative	J. Labouchere	329	52.4	
Labour	S. Taylor	299	47.6	
Majority		30	4.8	
Turnout		628	55.0	
Registered electors		1,131		
Conservative gain from Liberal Democrats		Swing		

=== Templar ===
Templar
Party	Candidate	Votes	%	±%
Conservative	J. Rogers*	206	46.0	
Liberal Democrats	A. Vincent	137	30.6	
Labour	P. Cusack	105	23.4	
Majority		69	15.4	
Turnout		448	38.7	
Registered electors		1,161		
Conservative hold		Swing		

=== Thetford Abbey ===
Thetford Abbey (2 seats)
Party	Candidate	Votes	%	±%
Labour	T. Paines*	756	73.4	
Labour	A. Paines*	679	65.9	
Liberal Democrats	D. Shephard	282	27.4	
Turnout		~1,030	29.2	
Registered electors		3,526		
Labour hold				
Labour hold				

=== Thetford Barnham Cross ===
Thetford Barnham Cross (2 seats)
Party	Candidate	Votes	%	±%
Labour	C. Armes*	724	82.3	
Labour	J. Bullock	590	67.0	
Liberal Democrats	D. Cooke	109	12.4	
Liberal Democrats	W. Porton	80	9.1	
Turnout		~880	34.3	
Registered electors		2,565		
Labour hold				
Labour hold				

=== Thetford Guildhall ===
Thetford Guildhall (3 seats)
Party	Candidate	Votes	%	±%
Labour	K. Key*	877	38.6	
Labour	R. Key	783	34.5	
Labour	J. Jarrett	764	33.7	
Liberal Democrats	D. Jeffery	519	22.9	
Independent	M. Page*	456	20.1	
Conservative	H. Parberry	427	18.8	
Liberal Democrats	K. Newland	384	16.9	
Conservative	B. Skull	382	16.8	
Turnout		~2,270	42.5	
Registered electors		5,341		
Labour gain from Conservative				
Labour gain from Conservative				
Labour gain from Conservative				

=== Thetford Saxon ===
Thetford Saxon (2 seats)
Party	Candidate	Votes	%	±%
Labour	D. Curzon-Berners	463	51.3	
Labour	D. O'Neill	453	50.2	
Independent	T. Lamb*	375	41.5	
Liberal Democrats	M. Smith	216	23.9	
Turnout		~903	38.0	
Registered electors		2,377		
Labour hold				
Labour gain from Independent				

=== Two Rivers ===
Two Rivers
Party	Candidate	Votes	%	±%
Conservative	J. Abbs*	415	50.8	
Labour	J. Clark	402	49.2	
Majority		13	1.6	
Turnout		817	50.0	
Registered electors		1,649		
Conservative hold		Swing		

=== Upper Wensum ===
Upper Wensum
Party	Candidate	Votes	%	±%
Labour	C. Rhodes	342	41.2	
Independent	H. Thompson*	219	26.4	
Conservative	B. Ravenscroft	215	25.9	
Liberal Democrats	E. Cornish	55	6.6	
Majority		123	14.8	
Turnout		831	55.0	
Registered electors		1,505		
Labour gain from Independent		Swing		

=== Upper Yare ===
Upper Yare
Party	Candidate	Votes	%	±%
Conservative	C. Jordan*	383	51.4	
Labour	P. Whitty	337	45.2	
Green	J. Stokes	25	3.4	
Majority		46	6.2	
Turnout		745	52.0	
Registered electors		1,454		
Conservative hold		Swing		

=== Watton ===
Watton (3 seats)
Party	Candidate	Votes	%	±%
Conservative	R. Rudling*	829	52.1	
Liberal Democrats	K. Gilbert	633	39.8	
Conservative	J. Bowyer*	595	37.4	
Liberal Democrats	J. Selvey	520	32.7	
Liberal Democrats	J. Glover	482	30.3	
Labour	J. Cannon	469	29.5	
Conservative	P. Darby	431	27.1	
Turnout		~1,590	34.0	
Registered electors		4,677		
Conservative hold				
Liberal Democrats gain from Independent				
Conservative hold				

=== Wayland ===
Wayland
Party	Candidate	Votes	%	±%
Conservative	G. Machorton	358	60.5	
Liberal Democrats	F. Caryer	234	39.5	
Majority		124	20.9	
Turnout		592	44.4	
Registered electors		1,336		
Conservative hold		Swing		

=== Weeting ===
Weeting
Party	Candidate	Votes	%	±%
Independent	S. Childerhouse*	Unopposed		
Registered electors		1,457		
Independent hold				

=== West Guiltcross ===
West Guiltcross
Party	Candidate	Votes	%	±%
Independent	J. Nunn	315	49.7	
Labour	A. Crowe	232	36.6	
Liberal Democrats	M. Rouse	87	13.7	
Majority		83	13.1	
Turnout		634	35.2	
Registered electors		1,456		
Independent hold		Swing		

=== Wissey ===
Wissey
Party	Candidate	Votes	%	±%
Conservative	J. Ball	Unopposed		
Registered electors		1,920		
Conservative hold				

== By-elections ==
=== Eynsford ===
Eynsford by-election: 6 February 1997
Party	Candidate	Votes	%	±%
Labour		235	40.1	
Conservative		211	36.0	
Liberal Democrats		140	23.9	
Majority		24	4.1	
Turnout		586	41.0	
Registered electors		1,429		
Labour hold		Swing		

=== Hermitage ===
Hermitage by-election: 14 August 1997
Party	Candidate	Votes	%	±%
Labour		335	57.7	
Conservative		214	36.8	
Liberal Democrats		32	5.5	
Majority		121	20.9	
Turnout		581	45.0	
Registered electors		1,291		
Labour hold		Swing		

=== Conifer ===
Conifer by-election: 4 December 1997
Party	Candidate	Votes	%	±%
Conservative		366	65.4	
Labour		128	22.9	
Liberal Democrats		66	11.8	
Majority		238	42.5	
Turnout		560	28.9	
Registered electors		1,938		
Conservative gain from Labour		Swing		

=== Upper Wensum ===
Upper Wensum by-election: 26 March 1998
Party	Candidate	Votes	%	±%
Conservative		321	47.1	
Labour		166	24.4	
Independent		165	24.2	
Green		29	4.3	
Majority		155	22.7	
Turnout		681	45.0	
Registered electors		1,513		
Conservative gain from Labour		Swing		

=== Thetford Guildhall ===
Thetford Guildhall by-election: 9 July 1998
Party	Candidate	Votes	%	±%
Conservative		662	58.0	
Labour		302	26.4	
Liberal Democrats		178	15.6	
Majority		360	31.6	
Turnout		1,142	20.0	
Registered electors		5,710		
Conservative gain from Labour		Swing		
