= 1979 Breckland District Council election =

UK local election

- 3 May 1979

All 53 seats to Breckland District Council 27 seats needed for a majority

	First party	Second party	Third party
Party	Conservative	Independent	Labour
Seats won	30	16	6
Seat change	▲12	▼7	▼3
Popular vote	21,032	12,190	16,398
Percentage	41.1%	23.8%	32.1%
Swing	▲2.2%	▼2.8%	▲0.1%
	Fourth party	Fifth party
Party	Ind. Conservative	Residents
Seats won	1	0
Seat change	▲1	▼1
Popular vote	1,272	did not stand
Percentage	2.5%	did not stand
Swing	N/A	▼1.9%
- Winner of each seat at the 1979 Breckland District Council election.
Control before election
No overall control
Control after election
Conservative

The 1979 Breckland District Council election took place on 3 May 1979 to elect members of Breckland District Council in Norfolk, England. This was on the same day as other local elections.

The council was contested on new ward boundaries, increasing the number of seats by 2 to 53.

== Summary ==
=== Election result ===
1979 Breckland District Council election
Party	Candidates	Seats	Gains	Losses	Net gain/loss	Seats %	Votes %	Votes	+/−
Conservative	41	30	N/A	N/A	▲12	56.6	41.1	21,032	+2.2
Independent	18	16	N/A	N/A	▼7	30.2	23.8	12,190	–2.8
Labour	21	6	N/A	N/A	▼3	11.3	32.1	16,398	+0.1
Ind. Conservative	1	1	N/A	N/A	▲1	1.9	2.5	1,272	N/A
Liberal	1	0	N/A	N/A	Steady	0.0	0.5	267	–0.1
Residents	0	0	N/A	N/A	▼1	N/A	N/A	N/A	–1.9

== Ward results ==
Incumbent councillors standing for re-election are marked with an asterisk (*). Changes in seats do not take into account by-elections or defections.

=== All Saints ===
All Saints
Party	Candidate	Votes	%	±%
Conservative	R. Harrison	731	67.3	
Labour	F. Towell	355	32.7	
Majority		376	34.6	
Turnout		1,086	76.5	
Registered electors		1,419		
Conservative gain from Independent		Swing		

=== Beetley & Gressenhall ===
Beetley & Gressenhall
Party	Candidate	Votes	%	±%
Conservative	I. Howard*	Unopposed		
Registered electors		1,234		
Conservative hold				

=== Besthorpe ===
Besthorpe
Party	Candidate	Votes	%
Independent	T. West	712	65.3
Labour	G. Gillan	378	34.7
Majority		334	30.6
Turnout		1,090	70.5
Registered electors		1,547	
Independent win (new seat)			

=== Buckenham ===
Buckenham
Party	Candidate	Votes	%	±%
Conservative	W. Barnes	Unopposed		
Registered electors		1,150		
Conservative gain from Independent				

=== Conifer ===
Conifer
Party	Candidate	Votes	%	±%
Independent	W. Emms*	705	60.6	
Conservative	D. Whiteford	458	39.4	
Majority		247	21.2	
Turnout		1,163	76.5	
Registered electors		1,520		
Independent hold		Swing		

=== East Dereham Neatherd ===
East Dereham Neatherd (2 seats)
Party	Candidate	Votes	%
Conservative	M. Duigan*	1,139	62.7
Conservative	M. Turnbull*	937	51.5
Labour	K. Potter	689	37.9
Labour	B. Barnard	635	34.9
Turnout		~1,818	70.9
Registered electors		2,563	
Conservative win (new seat)			
Conservative win (new seat)			

=== East Dereham St. Withburga ===
East Dereham St. Withburga
Party	Candidate	Votes	%
Conservative	O. Jarvis*	527	51.1
Labour	R. Thompson	505	48.9
Majority		22	2.2
Turnout		1,032	73.3
Registered electors		1,408	
Conservative win (new seat)			

=== East Dereham Toftwood ===
East Dereham Toftwood (2 seats)
Party	Candidate	Votes	%
Conservative	M. Fanthorpe	1,296	62.0
Conservative	J. Duigan*	1,176	56.3
Labour	V. Lawrence	636	30.4
Labour	G. Barnard	629	30.1
Turnout		~2,090	74.3
Registered electors		2,814	
Conservative win (new seat)			
Conservative win (new seat)			

=== East Dereham Town ===
East Dereham Town (2 seats)
Party	Candidate	Votes	%
Labour	L. Potter*	1,260	76.6
Conservative	G. Whitworth	565	34.3
Conservative	J. Torbit	513	31.2
Turnout		~1,645	74.1
Registered electors		2,221	
Labour win (new seat)			
Conservative win (new seat)			

=== East Guiltcross ===
East Guiltcross
Party	Candidate	Votes	%	±%
Independent	G. Aldridge*	448	53.7	
Independent	M. Hey	386	46.3	
Majority		62	7.4	
Turnout		834	73.5	
Registered electors		1,134		
Independent hold		Swing		

=== Eynsford ===
Eynsford
Party	Candidate	Votes	%	±%
Conservative	J. Hatley*	Unopposed		
Registered electors		1,193		
Conservative hold				

=== Haggard De Toni ===
Haggard De Toni
Party	Candidate	Votes	%	±%
Conservative	H. Wells-Cole*	Unopposed		
Registered electors		1,514		
Conservative gain from Independent				

=== Harling ===
Harling
Party	Candidate	Votes	%	±%
Conservative	K. Bulkeley*	Unopposed		
Registered electors		1,303		
Conservative gain from Independent				

=== Haverscroft ===
Haverscroft
Party	Candidate	Votes	%
Conservative	H. Howes	Unopposed	
Registered electors		1,528	
Conservative win (new seat)			

=== Heathlands ===
Heathlands
Party	Candidate	Votes	%	±%
Conservative	R. Musker*	Unopposed		
Registered electors		1,141		
Conservative gain from Independent				

=== Hermitage ===
Hermitage
Party	Candidate	Votes	%	±%
Conservative	J. Birkbeck*	Unopposed		
Registered electors		1,204		
Conservative hold				

=== Launditch ===
Launditch
Party	Candidate	Votes	%	±%
Independent	R. Butler-Stoney*	Unopposed		
Registered electors		1,106		
Independent hold				

=== Mattishall ===
Mattishall
Party	Candidate	Votes	%	±%
Conservative	B. Gorell-Barnes*	Unopposed		
Registered electors		1,716		
Conservative hold				

=== Mid Forest ===
Mid Forest
Party	Candidate	Votes	%	±%
Conservative	S. Steward*	Unopposed		
Registered electors		981		
Conservative hold				

=== Nar Valley ===
Nar Valley
Party	Candidate	Votes	%	±%
Conservative	C. Bellman	693	51.8	
Labour	M. Boddy*	646	48.2	
Majority		47	3.6	
Turnout		1,339	78.1	
Registered electors		1,714		
Conservative gain from Labour		Swing		

=== Necton ===
Necton
Party	Candidate	Votes	%	±%
Conservative	I. Bengeyfield*	742	68.8	
Labour	C. Copsey	337	31.2	
Majority		405	37.6	
Turnout		1,079	81.9	
Registered electors		1,318		
Conservative hold		Swing		

=== Peddars Way ===
Peddars Way
Party	Candidate	Votes	%	±%
Conservative	S. Steyerman	Unopposed		
Registered electors		1,277		
Conservative gain from Independent				

=== Queens ===
Queens
Party	Candidate	Votes	%
Conservative	T. Byford	Unopposed	
Registered electors		1,747	
Conservative win (new seat)			

=== Shipworth ===
Shipworth
Party	Candidate	Votes	%	±%
Conservative	J. Searle*	Unopposed		
Registered electors		1,716		
Conservative hold				

=== Springvale ===
Springvale
Party	Candidate	Votes	%	±%
Conservative	R. Shelton	518	63.1	
Independent	M. Reavey	303	36.9	
Majority		215	26.2	
Turnout		821	71.5	
Registered electors		1,148		
Conservative hold		Swing		

=== Swaffham ===
Swaffham (3 seats)
Party	Candidate	Votes	%	±%
Independent	J. Sampson*	1,467	51.5	
Conservative	T. Wilding*	1,440	50.6	
Independent	P. Ison*	1,355	47.6	
Labour	B. Marjoram	1,144	40.2	
Conservative	M. O'Connor	932	32.7	
Turnout		~2,846	75.3	
Registered electors		3,780		
Independent hold				
Conservative hold				
Independent hold				

=== Swanton Morley ===
Swanton Morley
Party	Candidate	Votes	%	±%
Conservative	J. Johnson*	Unopposed		
Registered electors		1,056		
Conservative gain from Independent				

=== Taverner ===
Taverner
Party	Candidate	Votes	%	±%
Independent	E. Stangroom*	704	83.1	
Labour	A. Bradley	143	16.9	
Majority		561	66.2	
Turnout		847	78.9	
Registered electors		1,073		
Independent hold		Swing		

=== Templar ===
Templar
Party	Candidate	Votes	%	±%
Conservative	D. Bouwens*	Unopposed		
Registered electors		765		
Conservative hold				

=== Thetford Abbey ===
Thetford Abbey (2 seats)
Party	Candidate	Votes	%	±%
Conservative	W. Greenfield	1,039	53.3	
Labour	M. Page*	1,017	42.5	
Labour	H. Crampton*	811	42.5	
Conservative	J. Ball	696	36.5	
Turnout		~1,909	65.7	
Registered electors		2,904		
Conservative gain from Labour				
Labour hold				

=== Thetford Barnham Cross ===
Thetford Barnham Cross (2 seats)
Party	Candidate	Votes	%	±%
Labour	J. Ramm*	1,231	64.7	
Labour	C. Armes*	1,202	63.1	
Conservative	D. Sawyer	550	28.9	
Conservative	H. Parberry	501	26.3	
Turnout		~1,904	70.0	
Registered electors		2,720		
Labour hold				
Labour hold				

=== Thetford Guildhall ===
Thetford Guildhall (3 seats)
Party	Candidate	Votes	%	±%
Conservative	F. Kew	1,610	56.0	
Conservative	F. Wilkes	1,465	50.9	
Independent	T. Lamb*	1,354	47.1	
Labour	R. Cooke	1,167	40.6	
Labour	C. Linton	712	24.8	
Turnout		~2,876	73.6	
Registered electors		3,906		
Conservative win (new seat)				
Conservative gain from Independent				
Independent hold				

=== Thetford Saxon ===
Thetford Saxon (2 seats)
Party	Candidate	Votes	%	±%
Labour	F. Room*	1,420	77.3	
Labour	J. Sweeney*	1,058	57.6	
Conservative	R. Clarke	674	36.7	
Conservative	J. Willett	588	32.0	
Turnout		~1,838	69.9	
Registered electors		2,631		
Labour hold				
Labour hold				

=== Two Rivers ===
Two Rivers
Party	Candidate	Votes	%	±%
Conservative	J. Abbs*	Unopposed		
Registered electors		1,332		
Conservative hold				

=== Upper Wensum ===
Upper Wensum
Party	Candidate	Votes	%	±%
Independent	G. Kerrison*	Unopposed		
Registered electors		1,354		
Independent hold				

=== Upper Yare ===
Upper Yare
Party	Candidate	Votes	%	±%
Independent	L. Brown*	Unopposed		
Registered electors		1,270		
Independent hold				

=== Watton ===
Watton (3 seats)
Party	Candidate	Votes	%	±%
Independent	G. Mitchell	1,481	58.0	
Independent	C. Cadman*	1,317	51.6	
Ind. Conservative	R. Rudling	1,272	49.8	
Conservative	J. Crabtree	1,212	47.5	
Conservative	A. Neaves*	619	24.3	
Turnout		~2,552	71.5	
Registered electors		3,569		
Independent gain from Residents				
Independent hold				
Ind. Conservative hold				

=== Wayland ===
Wayland
Party	Candidate	Votes	%	±%
Independent	G. Bailey*	450	52.3	
Conservative	E. Morfoot	411	47.7	
Majority		39	4.6	
Turnout		861	76.3	
Registered electors		1,128		
Independent gain from Labour		Swing		

=== Weeting ===
Weeting
Party	Candidate	Votes	%	±%
Independent	N. Parrott*	608	69.5	
Liberal	R. Green	267	30.5	
Majority		341	39.0	
Turnout		875	77.1	
Registered electors		1,135		
Independent hold		Swing		

=== West Guiltcross ===
West Guiltcross
Party	Candidate	Votes	%	±%
Independent	M. Mansbridge*	Unopposed		
Registered electors		1,226		
Independent hold				

=== Wissey ===
Wissey
Party	Candidate	Votes	%	±%
Independent	E. Johnson*	900	68.0	
Labour	R. Harvey	423	32.0	
Majority		477	36.0	
Turnout		1,323	74.7	
Registered electors		1,772		
Independent gain from Conservative		Swing		
