= 1991 Breckland District Council election =

Breckland District Council election

- 2 May 1991

All 53 seats to Breckland District Council 27 seats needed for a majority

	First party	Second party
Party	Conservative	Independent
Seats won	32	12
Seat change	▼1	▲1
Popular vote	18,016	9,099
Percentage	43.4%	21.9%
Swing	▼5.1%	▲7.6%
	Third party	Fourth party
Party	Labour	Liberal Democrats
Seats won	8	1
Seat change	▲1	▼1
Popular vote	11,582	1,369
Percentage	27.9%	3.3%
Swing	▲6.3%	▼12.3%
- Winner of each seat at the 1991 Breckland District Council election.
Council control before election
Conservative
Council control after election
Conservative

The 1991 Breckland District Council election took place on 2 May 1991 to elect members of Breckland District Council in England. This was on the same day as other local elections.

== Summary ==
=== Election result ===
1991 Breckland District Council election
Party	Candidates	Seats	Gains	Losses	Net gain/loss	Seats %	Votes %	Votes	+/−
Conservative	44	32	3	4	▼1	61.5	43.4	18,016	–6.0
Independent	20	12	3	2	▲1	21.2	21.9	9,099	+9.1
Labour	30	8	1	0	▲1	15.4	27.9	11,582	+6.0
Liberal Democrats	5	1	0	1	▼1	1.9	3.3	1,369	–12.6
Green	4	0	0	0	Steady	0.0	1.7	695	N/A
Ind. Conservative	1	0	0	0	Steady	0.0	1.0	418	N/A
Independent Labour	1	0	0	0	Steady	0.0	0.8	346	N/A

== Ward results ==
Incumbent councillors standing for re-election are marked with an asterisk (*). Changes in seats do not take into account by-elections or defections.

=== All Saints ===
All Saints
Party	Candidate	Votes	%	±%
Conservative	E. Southgate*	442	67.5	
Labour	J. Williams	213	32.5	
Majority		229	35.0	
Turnout		655	42.1	
Registered electors		1,563		
Conservative hold		Swing		

=== Beetley & Gressenhall ===
Beetley & Gressenhall
Party	Candidate	Votes	%	±%
Conservative	R. Shelton	463	52.6	
Ind. Conservative	P. Green	418	47.4	
Majority		45	5.1	
Turnout		881	51.1	
Registered electors		1,729		
Conservative hold		Swing		

=== Besthorpe ===
Besthorpe
Party	Candidate	Votes	%	±%
Conservative	K. Martin*	498	58.5	
Labour	P. Taylor	354	41.5	
Majority		144	16.9	
Turnout		852	45.5	
Registered electors		1,905		
Conservative hold		Swing		

=== Buckenham ===
Buckenham
Party	Candidate	Votes	%	±%
Independent	C. Wall	379	53.8	
Conservative	J. Marsh*	326	46.2	
Majority		53	7.5	
Turnout		705	55.1	
Registered electors		1,290		
Independent gain from Conservative		Swing		

=== Conifer ===
Conifer
Party	Candidate	Votes	%	±%
Conservative	D. Bryan*	Unopposed		
Registered electors		1,771		
Conservative hold				

=== East Dereham Neatherd ===
East Dereham Neatherd (2 seats)
Party	Candidate	Votes	%	±%
Conservative	M. Duigan*	775		
Conservative	G. Whitworth*	691		
Labour	V. Lawrence	427		
Labour	D. Craig	427		
Turnout		~1,343	45.9	
Registered electors		2,925		
Conservative hold				
Conservative hold				

=== East Dereham St. Withburga ===
East Dereham St. Withburga
Party	Candidate	Votes	%	±%
Conservative	M. Monument*	382	55.2	
Labour	S. Brown	310	44.8	
Majority		72	10.4	
Turnout		692	43.1	
Registered electors		1,602		
Conservative hold		Swing		

=== East Dereham Toftwood ===
East Dereham Toftwood (2 seats)
Party	Candidate	Votes	%	±%
Conservative	H. Hanna	778		
Conservative	M. Fanthorpe*	755		
Independent	J. Barnes	697		
Labour	J. Barker	491		
Labour	J. Dugdale	365		
Turnout		~1,700	44.1	
Registered electors		3,855		
Conservative gain from Liberal Democrats				
Conservative hold				

=== East Dereham Town ===
East Dereham Town (2 seats)
Party	Candidate	Votes	%	±%
Labour	L. Potter*	615		
Labour	R. Potter*	519		
Conservative	G. Shaw	362		
Conservative	P. Taylor	309		
Turnout		~987	43.9	
Registered electors		2,246		
Labour hold				
Labour hold				

=== East Guiltcross ===
East Guiltcross
Party	Candidate	Votes	%	±%
Conservative	A. Byrne	352	58.2	
Labour	K. South	253	41.8	
Majority		99	16.4	
Turnout		605	48.4	
Registered electors		1,274		
Conservative gain from Independent		Swing		

=== Eynsford ===
Eynsford
Party	Candidate	Votes	%	±%
Independent	D. Sayer*	Unopposed		
Registered electors		1,328		
Independent gain from Conservative				

=== Haggard De Toni ===
Haggard De Toni
Party	Candidate	Votes	%	±%
Conservative	K. Jelly*	Unopposed		
Registered electors		1,653		
Conservative hold				

=== Harling ===
Harling
Party	Candidate	Votes	%	±%
Conservative	M. Mawby	412	52.4	
Labour	A. Hanson	374	47.6	
Majority		38	4.8	
Turnout		786	49.6	
Registered electors		1,612		
Conservative hold		Swing		

=== Haverscroft ===
Haverscroft
Party	Candidate	Votes	%	±%
Conservative	A. Stasiak	511	66.9	
Labour	G. Maddern	253	33.1	
Majority		258	33.8	
Turnout		764	48.2	
Registered electors		1,617		
Conservative hold		Swing		

=== Heathlands ===
Heathlands
Party	Candidate	Votes	%	±%
Conservative	J. Wright	351	56.3	
Labour	D. Longmire	153	24.5	
Green	G. Leigh	120	19.2	
Majority		198	31.7	
Turnout		624	45.7	
Registered electors		1,363		
Conservative hold		Swing		

=== Hermitage ===
Hermitage
Party	Candidate	Votes	%	±%
Conservative	J. Birkbeck*	Unopposed		
Registered electors		1,177		
Conservative hold				

=== Launditch ===
Launditch
Party	Candidate	Votes	%	±%
Independent	R. Butler-Stoney*	Unopposed		
Registered electors		1,321		
Independent hold				

=== Mattishall ===
Mattishall
Party	Candidate	Votes	%	±%
Conservative	D. Pearson*	529	58.0	
Labour	C. Warman	383	42.0	
Majority		146	16.0	
Turnout		912	48.1	
Registered electors		1,923		
Conservative hold		Swing		

=== Mid Forest ===
Mid Forest
Party	Candidate	Votes	%	±%
Conservative	I. Monson	Unopposed		
Registered electors		957		
Conservative hold				

=== Nar Valley ===
Nar Valley
Party	Candidate	Votes	%	±%
Labour	J. Boddy*	Unopposed		
Registered electors		1,748		
Labour hold				

=== Necton ===
Necton
Party	Candidate	Votes	%	±%
Conservative	P. Darby	Unopposed		
Registered electors		1,456		
Conservative hold				

=== Peddars Way ===
Peddars Way
Party	Candidate	Votes	%	±%
Conservative	D. Foster	434	63.3	
Labour	M. Walsh	252	36.7	
Majority		182	26.5	
Turnout		686	44.9	
Registered electors		1,533		
Conservative hold		Swing		

=== Queens ===
Queens
Party	Candidate	Votes	%	±%
Conservative	B. Waters	662	62.7	
Labour	J. Alger	394	37.3	
Majority		268	25.4	
Turnout		1,056	36.2	
Registered electors		2,928		
Conservative hold		Swing		

=== Shipworth ===
Shipworth
Party	Candidate	Votes	%	±%
Independent	A. Matthews*	Unopposed		
Registered electors		1,917		
Independent hold				

=== Springvale ===
Springvale
Party	Candidate	Votes	%	±%
Conservative	J. Mallon*	466	65.3	
Labour	T. O'Callaghan	248	34.7	
Majority		218	30.5	
Turnout		714	40.7	
Registered electors		1,778		
Conservative hold		Swing		

=== Swaffham ===
Swaffham (3 seats)
Party	Candidate	Votes	%	±%
Independent	T. Wilding*	1,088		
Conservative	S. Mathews	944		
Independent	J. Sampson*	810		
Independent	P. Green	758		
Labour	B. Marjoram	734		
Labour	P. Buxton	447		
Turnout		~2,101	44.9	
Registered electors		4,678		
Independent hold				
Conservative hold				
Independent hold				

=== Swanton Morley ===
Swanton Morley
Party	Candidate	Votes	%	±%
Independent	J. Carrick	290	37.3	
Conservative	J. Keith	282	36.3	
Independent	N. Large	146	18.8	
Labour	R. Shepherd	59	7.6	
Majority		8	1.0	
Turnout		777	53.2	
Registered electors		1,490		
Independent gain from Conservative		Swing		

=== Taverner ===
Taverner
Party	Candidate	Votes	%	±%
Liberal Democrats	D. Rose*	486	77.8	
Conservative	M. Swetman	139	22.2	
Majority		347	55.5	
Turnout		625	54.9	
Registered electors		1,144		
Liberal Democrats hold		Swing		

=== Templar ===
Templar
Party	Candidate	Votes	%	±%
Conservative	J. Rogers	Unopposed		
Registered electors		1,039		
Conservative hold				

=== Thetford Abbey ===
Thetford Abbey (2 seats)
Party	Candidate	Votes	%	±%
Labour	T. Paines*	718		
Labour	A. Paines	647		
Conservative	R. Kybird	406		
Conservative	J. Cuff	389		
Liberal Democrats	M. Smith	211		
Liberal Democrats	W. Ruxton	188		
Green	D. Cooke	134		
Turnout		~1,443	40.9	
Registered electors		3,530		
Labour hold				
Labour gain from Conservative				

=== Thetford Barnham Cross ===
Thetford Barnham Cross (2 seats)
Party	Candidate	Votes	%	±%
Labour	C. Armes*	675		
Labour	M. Page	533		
Independent Labour	J. Ramm*	346		
Conservative	H. Parberry	262		
Liberal Democrats	P. Brind	160		
Turnout		~1,160	44.0	
Registered electors		2,636		
Labour hold				
Labour hold				

=== Thetford Guildhall ===
Thetford Guildhall (3 seats)
Party	Candidate	Votes	%	±%
Conservative	P. Pearson*	901		
Conservative	M. Kew*	766		
Conservative	D. Sawyer*	691		
Independent	F. Wilkes*	556		
Independent	D. Serjeant	534		
Independent	J. Atkinson	445		
Labour	C. Linton	401		
Green	J. Chisman	354		
Labour	P. Barker	350		
Liberal Democrats	M. Rouse	324		
Turnout		~2,115	41.7	
Registered electors		5,073		
Conservative hold				
Conservative hold				
Conservative hold				

=== Thetford Saxon ===
Thetford Saxon (2 seats)
Party	Candidate	Votes	%	±%
Labour	K. Key	642		
Independent	T. Lamb*	520		
Conservative	N. Lister	248		
Conservative	R. Hargrove	245		
Turnout		~1,083	43.3	
Registered electors		2,502		
Labour hold				
Independent hold				

=== Two Rivers ===
Two Rivers
Party	Candidate	Votes	%	±%
Conservative	J. Abbs*	Unopposed		
Registered electors		1,582		
Conservative hold				

=== Upper Wensum ===
Upper Wensum
Party	Candidate	Votes	%	±%
Independent	H. Thompson	495	58.3	
Conservative	B. Ravenscroft	354	41.7	
Majority		141	16.6	
Turnout		849	58.3	
Registered electors		1,476		
Independent hold		Swing		

=== Upper Yare ===
Upper Yare
Party	Candidate	Votes	%	±%
Conservative	C. Jordan	342	58.0	
Labour	W. Harris	248	42.0	
Majority		94	16.0	
Turnout		590	42.0	
Registered electors		1,420		
Conservative gain from Independent		Swing		

=== Watton ===
Watton (3 seats)
Party	Candidate	Votes	%	±%
Conservative	R. Rudling*	1,140		
Conservative	G. Mitchell*	1,118		
Independent	J. Bowyer	712		
Independent	K. Gilbert	708		
Turnout		~1,689	37.0	
Registered electors		4,568		
Conservative hold				
Conservative hold				
Independent hold				

=== Wayland ===
Wayland
Party	Candidate	Votes	%	±%
Conservative	E. Morfoot*	Unopposed		
Registered electors		1,311		
Conservative hold				

=== Weeting ===
Weeting
Party	Candidate	Votes	%	±%
Independent	S. Childerhouse*	498	75.2	
Independent	T. Donegan	164	24.8	
Majority		334	50.4	
Turnout		662	47.4	
Registered electors		1,428		
Independent hold		Swing		

=== West Guiltcross ===
West Guiltcross
Party	Candidate	Votes	%	±%
Independent	M. Mansbridge*	299	38.6	
Conservative	J. Attenborough	291	37.6	
Labour	O. Bernard	97	12.5	
Green	L. Whittle	87	11.2	
Majority		8	1.0	
Turnout		774	54.7	
Registered electors		1,425		
Independent hold		Swing		

=== Wissey ===
Wissey
Party	Candidate	Votes	%	±%
Conservative	D. Ralli*	Unopposed		
Registered electors		1,916		
Conservative hold				

== By-elections ==
=== Watton ===
Watton by-election: 9 September 1993
Party	Candidate	Votes	%	±%
Liberal Democrats		726	56.0	
Conservative		476	36.7	
Labour		95	7.3	
Majority		250	19.3	
Turnout		1,297	28.4	
Registered electors		4,567		
Liberal Democrats gain from Conservative		Swing		
