= 1976 Breckland District Council election =

1976 English local government election

- 6 May 1976

All 51 seats to Breckland District Council 26 seats needed for a majority

	First party	Second party	Third party
Party	Independent	Conservative	Labour
Seats won	22	19	9
Seat change	▲2	▼1	▼1
Popular vote	11,367	16,638	13,688
Percentage	26.6%	38.9%	32.0%
Swing	▲2.0%	▼0.7%	▼2.5%
	Fourth party	Fifth party
Party	Residents	Ind. Conservative
Seats won	1	0
Seat change	▲1	▼1
Popular vote	800	did not stand
Percentage	1.9%	did not stand
Swing	▲1.6%	▼0.8%
Control before election
No overall control
Control after election
No overall control

The 1976 Breckland District Council election took place on 6 May 1976 to elect members of Breckland District Council in Norfolk, England. This was on the same day as other local elections.

== Summary ==
=== Election result ===
1976 Breckland District Council election
Party	Candidates	Seats	Gains	Losses	Net gain/loss	Seats %	Votes %	Votes	+/−
Independent	31	22	5	3	▲2	35.3	26.6	11,367	+2.0
Conservative	24	19	3	4	▼1	45.1	38.9	16,638	–0.7
Labour	26	9	0	1	▼1	17.6	32.0	13,688	–2.5
Residents	2	1	1	0	▲1	2.0	1.9	800	+1.6
Liberal	2	0	0	0	Steady	0.0	0.6	245	+0.4
Ind. Conservative	0	0	0	1	▼1	0.0	N/A	N/A	–0.8

== Ward results ==
Incumbent councillors standing for re-election are marked with an asterisk (*). Changes in seats do not take into account by-elections or defections.

=== All Saints ===
All Saints
Party	Candidate	Votes	%	±%
Independent	A. Harvey*	467	70.9	
Labour	F. Towell	192	29.1	
Majority		275	41.8	
Turnout		659	51.4	
Registered electors		1,282		
Independent hold		Swing		

=== Beetley & Gressenhall ===
Beetley & Gressenhall
Party	Candidate	Votes	%	±%
Conservative	I. Howard*	447	76.3	
Liberal	A. Perry	139	23.7	
Majority		308	52.6	
Turnout		586	48.6	
Registered electors		1,205		
Conservative hold		Swing		

=== Buckenham ===
Buckenham
Party	Candidate	Votes	%	±%
Independent	E. Macro*	327	57.3	
Residents	W. Barnes	244	42.7	
Majority		83	14.6	
Turnout		571	53.8	
Registered electors		1,061		
Independent gain from Ind. Conservative		Swing		

=== Conifer ===
Conifer
Party	Candidate	Votes	%	±%
Independent	W. Emms*	365	56.0	
Independent	R. Shropshire	287	44.0	
Majority		78	12.0	
Turnout		652	45.7	
Registered electors		1,428		
Independent hold		Swing		

=== East Guiltcross ===
East Guiltcross
Party	Candidate	Votes	%	±%
Independent	G. Aldridge*	258	53.3	
Independent	L. Harrison	129	26.7	
Independent	F. Riches	97	20.0	
Majority		129	26.6	
Turnout		484	43.7	
Registered electors		1,108		
Independent hold		Swing		

=== Eynsford ===
Eynsford
Party	Candidate	Votes	%	±%
Conservative	J. Hatley*	528	77.6	
Labour	A. Bradley	152	22.4	
Majority		376	55.2	
Turnout		680	65.4	
Registered electors		1,040		
Conservative hold		Swing		

=== Haggard De Toni ===
Haggard De Toni
Party	Candidate	Votes	%	±%
Independent	H. Wells-Cole*	Unopposed		
Registered electors		1,388		
Independent hold				

=== Harling ===
Harling
Party	Candidate	Votes	%	±%
Independent	E. Bulkeley	Unopposed		
Registered electors		1,253		
Independent gain from Conservative				

=== Heathlands ===
Heathlands
Party	Candidate	Votes	%	±%
Independent	R. Musker*	Unopposed		
Registered electors		1,071		
Independent hold				

=== Hermitage ===
Hermitage
Party	Candidate	Votes	%	±%
Conservative	J. Birkbeck*	Unopposed		
Registered electors		1,182		
Conservative hold				

=== Launditch ===
Launditch
Party	Candidate	Votes	%	±%
Independent	R. Butler-Stoney*	Unopposed		
Registered electors		1,089		
Independent hold				

=== Mattishall ===
Mattishall
Party	Candidate	Votes	%	±%
Conservative	B. Barnes	Unopposed		
Registered electors		1,541		
Conservative hold				

=== Mid Forest ===
Mid Forest
Party	Candidate	Votes	%	±%
Conservative	S. Steward*	Unopposed		
Registered electors		963		
Conservative gain from Independent				

=== Nar Valley ===
Nar Valley
Party	Candidate	Votes	%	±%
Labour	M. Boddy*	486	51.3	
Conservative	J. Burton	461	48.7	
Majority		25	2.6	
Turnout		947	57.1	
Registered electors		1,659		
Labour hold		Swing		

=== Necton ===
Necton
Party	Candidate	Votes	%	±%
Conservative	L. Bengeyfield*	528	70.8	
Labour	A. Rosenberg	218	29.2	
Majority		310	41.6	
Turnout		746	64.8	
Registered electors		1,152		
Conservative hold		Swing		

=== No. 26 (Attleborough) ===
No. 26 (Attleborough) (3 seats)
Party	Candidate	Votes	%	±%
Independent	H. Underwood*	761	41.0	
Conservative	G. Alston*	757	40.8	
Independent	E. West*	684	36.9	
Conservative	F. Hornegold	578	31.2	
Labour	G. Gillan	336	18.1	
Labour	W. Tidy	293	15.8	
Turnout		~1,857	43.9	
Registered electors		4,228		
Independent hold				
Conservative hold				
Independent hold				

=== No. 5 (East Dereham) ===
No. 5 (East Dereham) (7 seats)
Party	Candidate	Votes	%	±%
Conservative	O. Jarvis*	1,914	38.4	
Conservative	M. Turnbull	1,741	35.0	
Conservative	J. Duigan*	1,721	34.6	
Conservative	M. Duigan*	1,721	34.6	
Labour	L. Potter*	1,719	34.5	
Conservative	R. Shelton*	1,566	31.5	
Conservative	G. Whitworth	1,413	28.4	
Independent	M. Fanthorpe	1,352	27.1	
Labour	R. Potter	1,109	22.3	
Labour	R. Thompson	1,082	21.7	
Labour	A. Harvey	820	16.5	
Labour	E. Guymer	772	15.5	
Labour	I. Dent	750	15.1	
Turnout		~4,985	61.1	
Registered electors		8,161		
Conservative hold				
Conservative hold				
Conservative hold				
Conservative hold				
Labour hold				
Conservative hold				
Conservative hold				

=== Peddars Way ===
Peddars Way
Party	Candidate	Votes	%	±%
Independent	H. Baker*	Unopposed		
Registered electors		1,268		
Independent hold				

=== Shipworth ===
Shipworth
Party	Candidate	Votes	%	±%
Conservative	J. Searle	415	49.9	
Labour	R. Hibbett	239	28.7	
Independent	E. Harvey	178	21.4	
Majority		176	21.2	
Turnout		832	51.3	
Registered electors		1,622		
Conservative hold		Swing		

=== Springvale ===
Springvale
Party	Candidate	Votes	%	±%
Conservative	R. Wright*	410	85.1	
Labour	E. Newson	72	14.9	
Majority		338	70.2	
Turnout		482	41.2	
Registered electors		1,170		
Conservative hold		Swing		

=== Swaffham ===
Swaffham (3 seats)
Party	Candidate	Votes	%	±%
Conservative	T. Wilding	1,040	38.1	
Independent	J. Sampson*	994	36.4	
Independent	P. Ison*	959	35.1	
Labour	B. Marjoram*	699	25.6	
Turnout		~2,731	75.2	
Registered electors		3,632		
Conservative gain from Labour				
Independent hold				
Independent hold				

=== Swanton Morley ===
Swanton Morley
Party	Candidate	Votes	%	±%
Independent	J. Johnson*	Unopposed		
Registered electors		1,299		
Independent gain from Conservative				

=== Taverner ===
Taverner
Party	Candidate	Votes	%	±%
Independent	E. Stangroom	357	56.0	
Conservative	A. Spinks*	157	24.6	
Independent	P. Edwards	123	19.3	
Majority		200	31.4	
Turnout		637	61.9	
Registered electors		1,029		
Independent gain from Conservative		Swing		

=== Templar ===
Templar
Party	Candidate	Votes	%	±%
Conservative	D. Bouwens	Unopposed		
Registered electors		677		
Conservative gain from Independent				

=== Thetford Abbey ===
Thetford Abbey (2 seats)
Party	Candidate	Votes	%	±%
Labour	H. Crampton*	484	57.7	
Labour	M. Page	405	48.3	
Conservative	W. Greenfield	355	42.3	
Turnout		~839	33.8	
Registered electors		2,482		
Labour hold				
Labour hold				

=== Thetford Barnham Cross ===
Thetford Barnham Cross (2 seats)
Party	Candidate	Votes	%	±%
Labour	C. Armes	620	68.1	
Labour	J. Ramm	587	64.5	
Independent	F. Wilkes	291	31.9	
Turnout		~910	35.5	
Registered electors		2,564		
Labour hold				
Labour hold				

=== Thetford Guildhall ===
Thetford Guildhall (2 seats)
Party	Candidate	Votes	%	±%
Independent	W. Crisp	865	72.9	
Independent	T. Lamb*	805	67.9	
Labour	W. Nunn	322	27.1	
Turnout		~1,189	39.0	
Registered electors		3,047		
Independent hold				
Independent hold				

=== Thetford Saxon ===
Thetford Saxon (2 seats)
Party	Candidate	Votes	%	±%
Labour	F. Room*	623	65.2	
Labour	J. Sweeney*	560	58.6	
Conservative	L. Hardwick	333	34.8	
Turnout		~956	36.3	
Registered electors		2,634		
Labour hold				
Labour hold				

=== Two Rivers ===
Two Rivers
Party	Candidate	Votes	%	±%
Conservative	J. Abbs	Unopposed		
Registered electors		1,360		
Conservative hold				

=== Upper Wensum ===
Upper Wensum
Party	Candidate	Votes	%	±%
Independent	G. Kerrison*	561	84.4	
Labour	J. Bantoft	104	15.6	
Majority		457	68.8	
Turnout		665	49.1	
Registered electors		1,354		
Independent hold		Swing		

=== Upper Yare ===
Upper Yare
Party	Candidate	Votes	%	±%
Independent	L. Brown*	Unopposed		
Registered electors		1,240		
Independent hold				

=== Watton ===
Watton (2 seats)
Party	Candidate	Votes	%	±%
Residents	A. Neaves	566	41.1	
Independent	C. Cadman	495	35.9	
Labour	F. Mayhew	317	23.0	
Independent	G. Mitchell*	309	22.4	
Turnout		~1,378	40.0	
Registered electors		3,444		
Residents gain from Independent				
Independent hold				

=== Wayland ===
Wayland
Party	Candidate	Votes	%	±%
Labour	G. Bailey*	410	64.9	
Independent	D. Thornhill	222	35.1	
Majority		188	29.8	
Turnout		632	57.9	
Registered electors		1,091		
Labour hold		Swing		

=== Weeting ===
Weeting
Party	Candidate	Votes	%	±%
Independent	N. Parrott*	481	81.9	
Liberal	R. Green	106	18.1	
Majority		375	63.8	
Turnout		587	56.1	
Registered electors		1,047		
Independent hold		Swing		

=== West Guiltcross ===
West Guiltcross
Party	Candidate	Votes	%	±%
Independent	M. Mansbridge*	Unopposed		
Registered electors		1,250		
Independent hold				

=== Wissey ===
Wissey
Party	Candidate	Votes	%	±%
Conservative	E. Johnson	553	63.6	
Labour	A. Markham	317	36.4	
Majority		236	27.2	
Turnout		870	52.8	
Registered electors		1,648		
Conservative hold		Swing		
