= 2007 Breckland District Council election =

2007 English local government election

- 3 May 2007

All 51 seats to Breckland District Council 26 seats needed for a majority

	First party	Second party	Third party
Party	Conservative	Labour	Independent
Seats won	48	3	3
Seat change	▲6	▼5	▼1
Popular vote	27,763	7,931	3,794
Percentage	62.2%	17.8%	8.5%
Swing	▲5.7%	▼7.1%	▲1.8%
- Winner of each seat at the 2007 Breckland District Council election.
Control before election
Conservative
Control after election
Conservative

The 2007 Breckland District Council election took place on 3 May 2007 to elect members of Breckland District Council in Norfolk, England. This was on the same day as other local elections.

== Summary ==
=== Election result ===
2007 Breckland District Council election
Party	Candidates	Seats	Gains	Losses	Net gain/loss	Seats %	Votes %	Votes	+/−
Conservative	54	48	6	0	▲6	88.9	62.2	27,763	+5.7
Labour	26	3	0	5	▼5	5.6	17.8	7,931	–7.1
Independent	8	3	1	2	▼1	5.6	8.5	3,794	+1.8
Green	11	0	0	0	Steady	0.0	6.2	2,755	+1.3
Liberal Democrats	7	0	0	0	Steady	0.0	4.7	2,080	–0.6
UKIP	2	0	0	0	Steady	0.0	0.7	330	N/A

== Ward results ==
Incumbent councillors standing for re-election are marked with an asterisk (*). Changes in seats do not take into account by-elections or defections.

=== All Saints ===
All Saints
Party	Candidate	Votes	%	±%
Conservative	Bill Smith*	446	58.6	
Independent	Frank Burch	311	40.9	
Majority		135	17.7	
Turnout		761	40.4	
Registered electors		1,883		
Conservative hold		Swing		

=== Buckenham ===
Buckenham
Party	Candidate	Votes	%	±%
Conservative	Adrian Joel*	Unopposed		
Registered electors		1,405		
Conservative hold		Swing		

=== Burgh & Haverscroft ===
Burgh & Haverscroft (2 seats)
Party	Candidate	Votes	%	±%
Conservative	Keith Martin*	658	64.6	
Conservative	Adrian Stasiak*	633	62.2	
Green	Sophie Benefer	309	30.4	
Turnout		~1,018	33.3	
Registered electors		3,058		
Conservative hold				
Conservative hold				

=== Conifer ===
Conifer
Party	Candidate	Votes	%	±%
Conservative	Ann Steward*	461	73.6	
Liberal Democrats	Kenneth Rooke	165	26.4	
Majority		296	47.3	
Turnout		626	41.7	
Registered electors		1,515		
Conservative hold		Swing		

=== Dereham-Central ===
Dereham-Central (2 seats)
Party	Candidate	Votes	%	±%
Labour	Robin Goreham*	600	42.9	
Labour	Michael Fanthorpe*	586	41.9	
Conservative	Robert Hambidge	570	40.7	
Conservative	Phil Irving	565	40.4	
Green	Sinead Bowyer	201	14.4	
Turnout		~1,399	32.3	
Registered electors		4,332		
Labour hold				
Labour hold				

=== Dereham-Humbletoft ===
Dereham-Humbletoft
Party	Candidate	Votes	%	±%
Conservative	Diana Irving	136	47.4	
Labour	Linda Goreham*	118	41.1	
Green	David Bowyer	33	11.5	
Majority		18	6.3	
Turnout		287	13.9	
Registered electors		2,070		
Conservative gain from Labour				

=== Dereham-Neatherd ===
Dereham-Neatherd (2 seats)
Party	Candidate	Votes	%	±%
Conservative	Linda Monument*	632	54.5	
Conservative	Michael Griffin*	525	45.3	
Green	Ann Bowyer	416	35.9	
Labour	Julian Crutch	243	21.0	
Labour	Alfred Dawson	189	16.3	
Turnout		~1,159	36.0	
Registered electors		3,219		
Conservative hold				
Conservative hold				

=== Dereham-Toftwood ===
Dereham-Toftwood (2 seats)
Party	Candidate	Votes	%	±%
Conservative	Phillip Duigan*	525	44.9	
Conservative	Lynda Turner	502	42.9	
Independent	June Barnes	328	28.1	
Green	Timothy Birt	318	27.2	
Labour	Thelma Johnson	249	21.3	
Labour	Patricia Tullis	203	17.4	
Turnout		~1,169	31.1	
Registered electors		3,758		
Conservative hold				
Conservative hold				

=== East Guiltcross ===
East Guiltcross
Party	Candidate	Votes	%	±%
Conservative	Stephen Askew*	407	74.8	
Green	Peter Maxey	137	25.2	
Majority		270	49.6	
Turnout		544	34.0	
Registered electors		1,610		
Conservative hold		Swing		

=== Eynsford ===
Eynsford
Party	Candidate	Votes	%	±%
Conservative	Gordon Bambridge*	531	72.0	
Labour	Roger Fryatt	206	28.0	
Majority		325	44.1	
Turnout		737	41.6	
Registered electors		1,798		
Conservative hold		Swing		

=== Haggard De Toni ===
Haggard De Toni
Party	Candidate	Votes	%	±%
Conservative	Theresa Hewett*	Unopposed		
Registered electors		1,791		
Conservative hold		Swing		

=== Harling & Heathlands ===
Harling & Heathlands (2 seats)
Party	Candidate	Votes	%	±%
Conservative	Roy Kemp*	713	66.0	
Conservative	Kay Fisher*	678	62.8	
Green	Tony Park	350	32.4	
Turnout		~1,080	33.5	
Registered electors		3,227		
Conservative hold				
Conservative hold				

=== Hermitage ===
Hermitage
Party	Candidate	Votes	%	±%
Conservative	John Labouchere*	540	75.7	
UKIP	Gill Savory	173	24.3	
Majority		367	51.4	
Turnout		713	39.8	
Registered electors		1,683		
Conservative hold		Swing		

=== Launditch ===
Launditch
Party	Candidate	Votes	%	±%
Conservative	Mark Kiddle-Morris	403	51.9	
Labour	Christopher Holland*	374	48.1	
Majority		29	3.8	
Turnout		777	49.1	
Registered electors		1,583		
Conservative gain from Labour				

=== Mid Forest ===
Mid Forest
Party	Candidate	Votes	%	±%
Conservative	Ian Monson*	Unopposed		
Registered electors		1,574		
Conservative hold		Swing		

=== Nar Valley ===
Nar Valley
Party	Candidate	Votes	%	±%
Conservative	Dave Williams*	Unopposed		
Registered electors		1,775		
Conservative hold		Swing		

=== Necton ===
Necton
Party	Candidate	Votes	%	±%
Conservative	Nigel Wilkin*	Unopposed		
Registered electors		1,561		
Conservative hold		Swing		

=== Queens ===
Queens (3 seats)
Party	Candidate	Votes	%	±%
Conservative	Alec Byrne	820	58.5	
Conservative	Peter Francis*	816	58.2	
Conservative	Shirley Howard Alpe*	743	53.0	
Independent	Bob Smith	568	40.5	
Turnout		~1,402	26.7	
Registered electors		5,251		
Conservative hold				
Conservative hold				
Conservative hold				

=== Shipdham ===
Shipdham
Party	Candidate	Votes	%	±%
Conservative	Paul Hewett*	384	78.5	
Labour	Chris Thorne	105	21.5	
Majority		279	57.0	
Turnout		489	29.7	
Registered electors		1,656		
Conservative hold		Swing		

=== Springvale & Scarning ===
Springvale & Scarning (2 seats)
Party	Candidate	Votes	%	±%
Conservative	John Gretton*	682	58.4	
Conservative	Elizabeth Gould*	679	58.1	
Green	Alison Keidan Cooper	376	32.2	
Labour	Lew Pearson	300	25.7	
Turnout		~1,168	31.0	
Registered electors		3,770		
Conservative hold				
Conservative hold				

=== Swaffham ===
Swaffham (3 seats)
Party	Candidate	Votes	%	±%
Conservative	Shirley Matthews*	1,116	56.3	
Conservative	Frank Sharpe	1,064	53.7	
Conservative	Ian Sherwood*	1,011	51.0	
Liberal Democrats	Charles Gunner	674	34.0	
Labour	Sandra Kerridge	548	27.6	
Turnout		~1,983	36.0	
Registered electors		5,508		
Conservative hold				
Conservative hold				
Conservative hold				

=== Swanton Morley ===
Swanton Morley
Party	Candidate	Votes	%	±%
Conservative	Kate Millbank	531	78.8	
Labour	Michael Johnson	143	21.2	
Majority		388	57.6	
Turnout		686	38.7	
Registered electors		1,772		
Conservative gain from Independent		Swing		

=== Taverner ===
Taverner
Party	Candidate	Votes	%	±%
Conservative	Richard Duffield*	Unopposed		
Registered electors		1,721		
Conservative hold		Swing		

=== Templar ===
Templar
Party	Candidate	Votes	%	±%
Conservative	John Rogers*	414	66.0	
Liberal Democrats	Dave Thomas	213	34.0	
Majority		201	32.0	
Turnout		627	36.3	
Registered electors		1,753		
Conservative hold		Swing		

=== Thetford-Abbey ===
Thetford-Abbey (2 seats)
Party	Candidate	Votes	%	±%
Independent	Pauline Quadling	375	43.7	
Conservative	Mike Spencer	322	37.5	
Labour	Albert Paines*	270	31.5	
Labour	Brenda Canham	228	26.6	
Conservative	Antonio d'Cocha	192	22.4	
Turnout		~858	25.0	
Registered electors		3,431		
Independent gain from Labour				
Conservative gain from Labour				

=== Thetford-Castle ===
Thetford-Castle
Party	Candidate	Votes	%	±%
Independent	Terence Lamb*	226	41.2	
Conservative	Roy Brame	154	28.1	
Liberal Democrats	Danny Jeffrey	105	19.2	
Labour	Ramon Barker	63	11.5	
Majority		72	13.1	
Turnout		548	37.0	
Registered electors		1,502		
Independent hold		Swing		

=== Thetford-Guildhall ===
Thetford-Guildhall (3 seats)
Party	Candidate	Votes	%	±%
Conservative	Robert Kybird*	720	48.6	
Conservative	Pam Spencer*	711	48.0	
Conservative	Derek Mortimer*	693	46.8	
Labour	Sylvia Armes	450	30.4	
Labour	Terry Jermy	375	25.3	
Labour	Mark Allison	353	23.8	
Liberal Democrats	Martin Rouse	329	22.2	
Turnout		~1,482	28.0	
Registered electors		5,292		
Conservative hold				
Conservative hold				
Conservative hold				

=== Thetford-Saxon ===
Thetford-Saxon (3 seats)
Party	Candidate	Votes	%	±%
Conservative	Marion Chapman-Allen*	573	42.5	
Conservative	Sam Chapman-Allen	517	38.4	
Labour	Pat Balaam	500	37.1	
Conservative	Gareth Pickering	470	34.9	
Labour	Jack Ramm*	459	34.1	
Labour	Dennis Sully	397	29.5	
Liberal Democrats	Mike Brindle	367	27.2	
Turnout		~1,347	27.0	
Registered electors		4,989		
Conservative hold				
Conservative gain from Labour				
Labour hold				

=== Two Rivers ===
Two Rivers (2 seats)
Party	Candidate	Votes	%	±%
Conservative	Brian Rose*	851	63.2	
Conservative	Paul Claussen*	750	55.7	
Green	Steve Blake	406	30.1	
Turnout		~1,206	37.0	
Registered electors		3,259		
Conservative hold				
Conservative hold				

=== Upper Wensum ===
Upper Wensum
Party	Candidate	Votes	%	±%
Conservative	Bill Borrett	486	62.7	
UKIP	John Savory	157	20.3	
Labour	Gary Greenwood	132	17.0	
Majority		329	42.5	
Turnout		775	44.0	
Registered electors		1,803		
Conservative hold		Swing		

=== Upper Yare ===
Upper Yare
Party	Candidate	Votes	%	±%
Conservative	Cliff Jordan*	627	79.2	
Labour	Tim Mantripp	165	20.8	
Majority		462	58.4	
Turnout		792	40.0	
Registered electors		1,880		
Conservative hold		Swing		

=== Watton ===
Watton (3 seats)
Party	Candidate	Votes	%	±%
Conservative	Claire Bowes	1,082	57.0	
Independent	Keith Gilbert*	967	51.0	
Conservative	David Myers	879	46.3	
Independent	John Craifie	750	39.5	
Conservative	Bryan Wykes	718	37.8	
Labour	Margaret Holmes	368	19.4	
Labour	Chris Walls	307	16.2	
Turnout		~1,897	34.0	
Registered electors		5,581		
Conservative hold				
Independent hold				
Conservative hold				

=== Wayland ===
Wayland
Party	Candidate	Votes	%	±%
Conservative	Phil Cowen*	Unopposed		
Registered electors		1,682		
Conservative hold		Swing		

=== Weeting ===
Weeting
Party	Candidate	Votes	%	±%
Conservative	Robert Childerhouse	333	45.9	
Independent	Sheila Childerhouse*	269	37.1	
Green	Jeffery Prosser	123	17.0	
Majority		64	8.8	
Turnout		725	41.0	
Registered electors		1,778		
Conservative gain from Independent		Swing		

=== West Guiltcross ===
West Guiltcross
Party	Candidate	Votes	%	±%
Conservative	William Nunn*	481	60.6	
Liberal Democrats	Steve Gordon	227	28.6	
Green	Donna Park	86	10.8	
Majority		254	32.0	
Turnout		794	48.0	
Registered electors		1,679		
Conservative hold		Swing		

=== Wissey ===
Wissey
Party	Candidate	Votes	%	±%
Conservative	Jill Ball*	Unopposed		
Registered electors		1,924		
Conservative hold		Swing		

== By-elections ==
Queen's By-Election 4 June 2009
Party	Candidate	Votes	%	±%
Conservative		863	48.8	−10.3
Independent		673	38.1	
Labour		231	13.1	+13.1
Majority		190	10.8	
Turnout		1,767	24.3	
Conservative hold		Swing		
