= 1983 Breckland District Council election =

1983 English local election

- 5 May 1983

All 53 seats to Breckland District Council 27 seats needed for a majority

	First party	Second party	Third party
Party	Conservative	Independent	Labour
Seats won	25	19	8
Seat change	▼5	▲3	▲2
Popular vote	11,367	8,408	8,569
Percentage	35.9%	26.6%	27.1%
Swing	▼5.2%	▲2.8%	▼5.0%
	Fourth party	Fifth party
Party	Alliance	Ind. Conservative
Seats won	1	0
Seat change	▲1	▼1
Popular vote	3,297	did not stand
Percentage	10.4%	did not stand
Swing	▲9.9%	▼2.5%
- Winner of each seat at the 1983 Breckland District Council election.
Control before election
Conservative
Control after election
No overall control

The 1983 Breckland District Council election took place on 5 May 1983 to elect members of Breckland District Council in Norfolk, England. This was on the same day as other local elections.

== Summary ==
=== Election result ===
1983 Breckland District Council election
Party	Candidates	Seats	Gains	Losses	Net gain/loss	Seats %	Votes %	Votes	+/−
Conservative	32	25	5	10	▼5	60.4	35.9	11,367	–5.2
Independent	31	19	7	4	▲3	22.6	26.6	8,408	+2.8
Labour	23	8	2	0	▲2	15.1	27.1	8,569	–5.0
Alliance	10	1	1	0	▲1	1.9	10.4	3,297	+9.9
Ind. Conservative	0	0	0	1	▼1	N/A	N/A	N/A	–2.5

== Ward results ==
Incumbent councillors standing for re-election are marked with an asterisk (*). Changes in seats do not take into account by-elections or defections.

=== All Saints ===
All Saints
Party	Candidate	Votes	%	±%
Conservative	E. Southgate	Unopposed		
Registered electors		1,477		
Conservative hold				

=== Beetley & Gressenhall ===
Beetley & Gressenhall
Party	Candidate	Votes	%	±%
Conservative	I. Howard*	496	64.2	
Independent	B. Barnard	277	35.8	
Majority		219	28.4	
Turnout		773	51.7	
Registered electors		1,494		
Conservative hold		Swing		

=== Besthorpe ===
Besthorpe
Party	Candidate	Votes	%	±%
Conservative	K. Martin	573	69.2	
Labour	W. Cudd	255	30.8	
Majority		318	38.4	
Turnout		828	48.2	
Registered electors		1,719		
Conservative gain from Independent		Swing		

=== Buckenham ===
Buckenham
Party	Candidate	Votes	%	±%
Conservative	J. Marsh	394	63.0	
Labour	C. Phillips	231	37.0	
Majority		163	26.0	
Turnout		625	50.4	
Registered electors		1,240		
Conservative hold		Swing		

=== Conifer ===
Conifer
Party	Candidate	Votes	%	±%
Independent	W. Emms*	Unopposed		
Registered electors		1,603		
Independent hold				

=== East Dereham Neatherd ===
East Dereham Neatherd (2 seats)
Party	Candidate	Votes	%	±%
Conservative	M. Duigan*	719	61.0	
Conservative	G. Whitworth	573	48.6	
Labour	I. Woodhall	272	23.1	
Labour	W. McBeath	229	19.4	
Alliance	J. Copsey	189	16.0	
Turnout		~1,178	44.0	
Registered electors		2,679		
Conservative hold				
Conservative hold				

=== East Dereham St. Withburga ===
East Dereham St. Withburga
Party	Candidate	Votes	%	±%
Conservative	M. Goodman	343	53.9	
Labour	R. Thompson	293	46.1	
Majority		50	7.8	
Turnout		636	41.2	
Registered electors		1,542		
Conservative hold		Swing		

=== East Dereham Toftwood ===
East Dereham Toftwood (2 seats)
Party	Candidate	Votes	%	±%
Conservative	M. Fanthorpe*	799	55.2	
Conservative	B. Cross	719	49.7	
Alliance	P. Allnatt	362	25.0	
Alliance	H. Allnatt	289	20.0	
Labour	K. Potter	286	19.8	
Labour	V. Lawrence	242	16.7	
Turnout		~1,447	42.9	
Registered electors		3,374		
Conservative hold				
Conservative hold				

=== East Dereham Town ===
East Dereham Town (2 seats)
Party	Candidate	Votes	%	±%
Labour	L. Potter*	728	63.8	
Labour	R. Potter	461	40.4	
Independent	D. Gamble	413	36.2	
Turnout		~1,141	50.0	
Registered electors		2,281		
Labour hold				
Labour gain from Conservative				

=== East Guiltcross ===
East Guiltcross
Party	Candidate	Votes	%	±%
Independent	K. Simpson	221	40.2	
Independent	G. Aldridge*	150	27.3	
Independent	M. Hey	116	21.1	
Labour	A. Davies	63	11.5	
Majority		71	12.9	
Turnout		550	46.9	
Registered electors		1,173		
Independent hold		Swing		

=== Eynsford ===
Eynsford
Party	Candidate	Votes	%	±%
Conservative	J. Hatley*	Unopposed		
Registered electors		1,222		
Conservative hold				

=== Haggard De Toni ===
Haggard De Toni
Party	Candidate	Votes	%	±%
Conservative	K. Jelly	Unopposed		
Registered electors		1,589		
Conservative hold				

=== Harling ===
Harling
Party	Candidate	Votes	%	±%
Independent	K. Bulkeley*	Unopposed		
Registered electors		1,443		
Independent gain from Conservative				

=== Haverscroft ===
Haverscroft
Party	Candidate	Votes	%	±%
Conservative	P. Shaw	467	58.4	
Alliance	J. Lascelles	208	26.0	
Independent	E. Lock	125	15.6	
Majority		259	32.4	
Turnout		800	50.5	
Registered electors		1,584		
Conservative hold		Swing		

=== Heathlands ===
Heathlands
Party	Candidate	Votes	%	±%
Conservative	T. Stevenson	Unopposed		
Registered electors		1,230		
Conservative hold				

=== Hermitage ===
Hermitage
Party	Candidate	Votes	%	±%
Conservative	J. Birkbeck*	Unopposed		
Registered electors		1,162		
Conservative hold				

=== Launditch ===
Launditch
Party	Candidate	Votes	%	±%
Independent	R. Butler-Stoney*	Unopposed		
Registered electors		1,176		
Independent hold				

=== Mattishall ===
Mattishall
Party	Candidate	Votes	%	±%
Independent	D. Pearson	Unopposed		
Registered electors		1,805		
Independent gain from Conservative				

=== Mid Forest ===
Mid Forest
Party	Candidate	Votes	%	±%
Conservative	S. Steward*	Unopposed		
Registered electors		956		
Conservative hold				

=== Nar Valley ===
Nar Valley
Party	Candidate	Votes	%	±%
Labour	M. Boddy	479	55.2	
Independent	T. Hawkins	389	44.8	
Majority		90	10.4	
Turnout		868	50.1	
Registered electors		1,732		
Labour gain from Conservative		Swing		

=== Necton ===
Necton
Party	Candidate	Votes	%	±%
Independent	J. Bowcock	476	66.2	
Labour	W. Spalding	128	17.8	
Alliance	T. Owen	115	16.0	
Majority		348	48.4	
Turnout		719	50.2	
Registered electors		1,431		
Independent gain from Conservative		Swing		

=== Peddars Way ===
Peddars Way
Party	Candidate	Votes	%	±%
Independent	S. Steyerman*	Unopposed		
Registered electors		1,398		
Independent gain from Conservative				

=== Queens ===
Queens
Party	Candidate	Votes	%	±%
Conservative	T. Byford*	516	71.7	
Independent	F. Towell	204	28.3	
Majority		312	43.4	
Turnout		720	30.0	
Registered electors		2,401		
Conservative hold		Swing		

=== Shipworth ===
Shipworth
Party	Candidate	Votes	%	±%
Independent	A. Mathews	414	57.8	
Conservative	J. Searle*	302	42.2	
Majority		112	15.6	
Turnout		716	38.6	
Registered electors		1,853		
Independent gain from Conservative		Swing		

=== Springvale ===
Springvale
Party	Candidate	Votes	%	±%
Conservative	R. Shelton*	291	73.9	
Independent	M. Revey	103	26.1	
Majority		188	47.8	
Turnout		394	32.8	
Registered electors		1,202		
Conservative hold		Swing		

=== Swaffham ===
Swaffham (3 seats)
Party	Candidate	Votes	%	±%
Independent	T. Wilding*	1,042	49.2	
Independent	P. Ison*	1,034	48.8	
Independent	J. Sampson*	1,004	47.4	
Alliance	E. Baxter	639	30.2	
Labour	B. Marjoram	435	20.5	
Turnout		~2,117	52.0	
Registered electors		4,071		
Independent gain from Conservative				
Independent hold				
Independent hold				

=== Swanton Morley ===
Swanton Morley
Party	Candidate	Votes	%	±%
Conservative	J. Johnson*	Unopposed		
Registered electors		1,436		
Conservative hold				

=== Taverner ===
Taverner
Party	Candidate	Votes	%	±%
Independent	E. Stangroom*	366	64.9	
Conservative	P. Jeffery	198	35.1	
Majority		168	29.8	
Turnout		564	51.6	
Registered electors		1,092		
Independent hold		Swing		

=== Templar ===
Templar
Party	Candidate	Votes	%	±%
Conservative	R. Buscall	Unopposed		
Registered electors		788		
Conservative hold				

=== Thetford Abbey ===
Thetford Abbey (2 seats)
Party	Candidate	Votes	%	±%
Alliance	F. Attfield	642	39.7	
Labour	T. Paines	494	30.6	
Conservative	A. Coldwell	483	29.9	
Conservative	J. Galbraith	448	27.7	
Labour	G. McGinty	423	26.2	
Turnout		~1,617	46.7	
Registered electors		3,464		
Alliance gain from Conservative				
Labour hold				

=== Thetford Barnham Cross ===
Thetford Barnham Cross (2 seats)
Party	Candidate	Votes	%	±%
Labour	C. Armes*	733	66.6	
Labour	J. Ramm*	691	62.8	
Conservative	H. Marshall	369	33.5	
Conservative	H. Parberry	309	28.1	
Turnout		~1,101	38.6	
Registered electors		2,854		
Labour hold				
Labour hold				

=== Thetford Guildhall ===
Thetford Guildhall (3 seats)
Party	Candidate	Votes	%	±%
Conservative	F. Kew*	1,127	47.2	
Conservative	D. Sawyer	939	39.3	
Conservative	F. Wilkes*	893	37.4	
Independent	T. Lamb*	821	34.4	
Labour	A. Paines	437	18.3	
Labour	M. Don	362	15.2	
Turnout		~2,388	51.8	
Registered electors		4,608		
Conservative hold				
Conservative gain from Independent				
Conservative hold				

=== Thetford Saxon ===
Thetford Saxon (2 seats)
Party	Candidate	Votes	%	±%
Labour	F. Room*	524	43.4	
Labour	K. Key	403	33.4	
Alliance	M. Curtis	374	31.0	
Independent	V. Habgood	310	25.7	
Independent	P. Van Weegen	286	23.7	
Turnout		~1,208	46.2	
Registered electors		2,614		
Labour hold				
Labour hold				

=== Two Rivers ===
Two Rivers
Party	Candidate	Votes	%	±%
Independent	J. Abbs*	Unopposed		
Registered electors		1,469		
Independent gain from Conservative				

=== Upper Wensum ===
Upper Wensum
Party	Candidate	Votes	%	±%
Independent	G. Kerrison*	Unopposed		
Registered electors		1,389		
Independent hold				

=== Upper Yare ===
Upper Yare
Party	Candidate	Votes	%	±%
Independent	L. Brown*	Unopposed		
Registered electors		1,339		
Independent hold				

=== Watton ===
Watton (3 seats)
Party	Candidate	Votes	%	±%
Independent	C. Cadman*	Unopposed		
Conservative	R. Rudling*	Unopposed		
Conservative	G. Mitchell*	Unopposed		
Registered electors		3,916		
Independent hold				
Conservative gain from Ind. Conservative				
Conservative gain from Independent				

=== Wayland ===
Wayland
Party	Candidate	Votes	%	±%
Conservative	E. Morfoot	409	54.5	
Independent	G. Bailey*	342	45.5	
Majority		67	9.0	
Turnout		751	61.7	
Registered electors		1,218		
Conservative gain from Independent		Swing		

=== Weeting ===
Weeting
Party	Candidate	Votes	%	±%
Independent	S. Childerhouse	288	43.1	
Alliance	R. Green	193	28.9	
Labour	S. Drewry	187	28.0	
Majority		95	14.2	
Turnout		668	52.7	
Registered electors		1,267		
Independent hold		Swing		

=== West Guiltcross ===
West Guiltcross
Party	Candidate	Votes	%	±%
Independent	M. Mansbridge*	Unopposed		
Registered electors		1,313		
Independent hold				

=== Wissey ===
Wissey
Party	Candidate	Votes	%	±%
Independent	J. Lloyd	527	51.4	
Alliance	L. Jacklin	286	27.9	
Labour	P. Betney	213	20.8	
Majority		241	23.5	
Turnout		1,026	55.1	
Registered electors		1,861		
Independent hold		Swing		
