= 2003 Breckland District Council election =

2003 English local government election

- 1 May 2003

All 54 seats to Breckland District Council 28 seats needed for a majority

	First party	Second party
Party	Conservative	Labour
Seats won	42	8
Seat change	▲8	▼6
Popular vote	22,766	10,040
Percentage	56.5%	24.9%
Swing	▲10.3%	▼6.1%
	Third party	Fourth party
Party	Independent	Liberal Democrats
Seats won	4	0
Seat change	▲1	▼2
Popular vote	2,715	2,118
Percentage	6.7%	5.3%
Swing	▲1.7%	▼9.5%
- Winner of each seat at the 2003 Breckland District Council election.
Control before election
Conservative
Control after election
Conservative

The 2003 Breckland District Council election took place on 1 May 2003 to elect members of Breckland District Council in Norfolk, England. This was on the same day as other local elections.

== Summary ==
=== Election result ===
2003 Breckland District Council election
Party	Candidates	Seats	Gains	Losses	Net gain/loss	Seats %	Votes %	Votes	+/−
Conservative	49	42	N/A	N/A	▲8	77.8	56.5	22,766	+10.3
Labour	37	8	N/A	N/A	▼6	14.8	24.9	10,040	–6.1
Independent	9	4	N/A	N/A	▲1	7.4	6.7	2,715	+1.7
Green	12	0	N/A	N/A	Steady	0.0	4.9	1,976	+1.9
Liberal Democrats	7	0	N/A	N/A	▼2	0.0	5.3	2,118	–9.5
Liberal	1	0	N/A	N/A	Steady	0.0	1.7	679	N/A

== Ward results ==
Incumbent councillors standing for re-election are marked with an asterisk (*). Changes in seats do not take into account by-elections or defections.

=== All Saints ===
All Saints
Party	Candidate	Votes	%	±%
Conservative	William Smith*	473	72.0	
Labour	Robert Smith	184	28.0	
Majority		289	44.0	
Turnout		657	38.0	
Registered electors		1,770		
Conservative hold		Swing		

=== Buckenham ===
Buckenham
Party	Candidate	Votes	%	±%
Conservative	Adrian Joel*	491	75.7	
Labour	Mark Stevens	80	12.3	
Green	Graham Richmond-Shaw	78	12.0	
Majority		411	63.4	
Turnout		649	49.0	
Registered electors		1,330		
Conservative hold		Swing		

=== Burgh & Haverscroft ===
Burgh & Haverscroft (2 seats)
Party	Candidate	Votes	%
Conservative	Keith Martin*	629	60.2
Conservative	Adrian Stasiak*	606	58.0
Independent	Jonathan Evans	252	24.1
Labour	Peter Cooper	188	18.0
Labour	James Belsey	170	16.3
Green	Liam Carroll	117	11.2
Turnout		~1,045	35.0
Registered electors		2,985	
Conservative win (new seat)			
Conservative win (new seat)			

=== Conifer ===
Conifer
Party	Candidate	Votes	%	±%
Conservative	Ann Steward	Unopposed		
Registered electors		1,489		
Conservative hold				

=== Dereham-Central ===
Dereham-Central (2 seats)
Party	Candidate	Votes	%
Labour	Robin Goreham*	546	48.8
Labour	Michael Fanthorpe*	523	46.8
Conservative	George Barnard	436	39.0
Conservative	John Cheetham	417	37.3
Green	Jasmine Rising	121	10.8
Turnout		~1,118	27.0
Registered electors		4,142	
Labour win (new seat)			
Labour win (new seat)			

=== Dereham-Humbletoft ===
Dereham-Humbletoft
Party	Candidate	Votes	%	±%
Labour	Linda Goreham*	223	44.3	
Conservative	Ursula Cheetham	218	43.3	
Green	David Bowyer	62	12.3	
Majority		5	1.0	
Turnout		503	28.0	
Registered electors		1,793		
Labour hold		Swing		

=== Dereham-Neatherd ===
Dereham-Neatherd (2 seats)
Party	Candidate	Votes	%	±%
Conservative	Linda Monument*	463	47.6	
Conservative	Michael Griffin	399	41.0	
Labour	Timothy Mantrip	312	32.1	
Green	Ann Bowyer	295	30.3	
Labour	Gordon Mitchell	279	28.7	
Turnout		~972	31.0	
Registered electors		3,135		
Conservative hold				
Conservative gain from Labour				

=== Dereham-Toftwood ===
Dereham-Toftwood (2 seats)
Party	Candidate	Votes	%	±%
Conservative	Phillip Duigan*	361	39.1	
Conservative	Michael Ward	351	38.0	
Labour	William Sheath*	293	31.7	
Independent	June Barnes	264	28.6	
Labour	Julian Crutch	236	25.5	
Green	Timothy Birt	176	19.0	
Turnout		~924	27.0	
Registered electors		3,421		
Conservative hold				
Conservative gain from Labour				

=== East Guiltcross ===
East Guiltcross
Party	Candidate	Votes	%	±%
Conservative	Stephen Askew	310	68.0	
Green	Donna Park	146	32.0	
Majority		164	36.0	
Turnout		456	30.0	
Registered electors		1,524		
Conservative hold		Swing		

=== Eynsford ===
Eynsford
Party	Candidate	Votes	%	±%
Conservative	Stanley Bambridge	337	50.4	
Labour	John Mallen*	331	49.6	
Majority		6	0.9	
Turnout		668	37.0	
Registered electors		1,802		
Conservative gain from Labour		Swing		

=== Haggard De Toni ===
Haggard De Toni
Party	Candidate	Votes	%	±%
Conservative	Theresa Hewitt	426	69.7	
Liberal Democrats	Kenneth Rooke	185	30.3	
Majority		241	39.4	
Turnout		611	29.0	
Registered electors		1,781		
Conservative gain from Liberal Democrats		Swing		

=== Harling & Heathlands ===
Harling & Heathlands (2 seats)
Party	Candidate	Votes	%
Conservative	Roy Kemp*	754	
Conservative	Karen Fisher	669	
Labour	Anne Hanson	257	
Green	Molly O'Brien	213	
Turnout		~1,111	35.0
Registered electors		3,174	
Conservative win (new seat)			
Conservative win (new seat)			

=== Hermitage ===
Hermitage
Party	Candidate	Votes	%	±%
Conservative	John Labouchere	369	49.4	
Independent	Brian Rivett	227	30.4	
Labour	Philip Cooper	151	20.2	
Majority		142	19.0	
Turnout		747	45.0	
Registered electors		1,659		
Conservative hold		Swing		

=== Launditch ===
Launditch
Party	Candidate	Votes	%	±%
Labour	Christopher Holland*	366	51.3	
Conservative	Nicholas Taylor	347	48.7	
Majority		19	2.7	
Turnout		713	47.0	
Registered electors		1,551		
Labour hold		Swing		

=== Mid Forest ===
Mid Forest
Party	Candidate	Votes	%	±%
Conservative	Ian Monson*	Unopposed		
Registered electors		1,571		
Conservative hold				

=== Nar Valley ===
Nar Valley
Party	Candidate	Votes	%	±%
Conservative	David Williams*	Unopposed		
Registered electors		1,813		
Conservative hold				

=== Necton ===
Necton
Party	Candidate	Votes	%	±%
Conservative	Nigel Wilkin*	374	66.7	
Independent	Brian Borgars	187	33.3	
Majority		187	33.3	
Turnout		561	38.0	
Registered electors		1,491		
Conservative hold		Swing		

=== Queens ===
Queens (3 seats)
Party	Candidate	Votes	%
Conservative	Peter Neal	768	65.9
Conservative	Peter Francis*	753	64.6
Conservative	Shirley Howard-Alpe	663	56.9
Labour	Jonathan Dugdale	295	25.3
Green	Tony Park	278	23.9
Labour	Anthony O'Callaghan	262	22.5
Turnout		~1,165	24.0
Registered electors		4,857	
Conservative win (new boundaries)			
Conservative win (new boundaries)			
Conservative win (new boundaries)			

=== Shipdham ===
Shipdham
Party	Candidate	Votes	%
Conservative	Paul Hewett	387	71.5
Labour	Christopher Thorne	154	28.5
Majority		233	43.1
Turnout		541	34.0
Registered electors		1,643	
Conservative win (new seat)			

=== Springvale & Scarning ===
Springvale & Scarning (2 seats)
Party	Candidate	Votes	%
Conservative	Elizabeth Gould	576	57.8
Conservative	John Gretton	545	54.7
Labour	Lewis Pearson	264	26.5
Labour	Graham Hayden	239	24.0
Green	Alison Keidan-Cooper	189	19.0
Turnout		~996	28.0
Registered electors		3,558	
Conservative win (new seat)			
Conservative win (new seat)			

=== Swaffham ===
Swaffham (3 seats)
Party	Candidate	Votes	%	±%
Conservative	Shirley Matthews*	833	52.4	
Conservative	Paul Darby*	765	48.1	
Conservative	Ian Sherwood*	759	47.7	
Liberal	David Cannon	679	42.7	
Liberal Democrats	Paul Howell	663	41.7	
Liberal Democrats	Peter Francis	614	38.6	
Turnout		~1,590	30.0	
Registered electors		5,301		
Conservative hold				
Conservative hold				
Conservative hold				

=== Swanton Morley ===
Swanton Morley
Party	Candidate	Votes	%	±%
Independent	John Carrick*	234	31.7	
Independent	Rosemary Northall	217	29.4	
Conservative	David Ashford	213	28.8	
Labour	Anthony Bartram	75	10.1	
Majority		17	2.3	
Turnout		739	43.0	
Registered electors		1,725		
Independent hold		Swing		

=== Taverner ===
Taverner
Party	Candidate	Votes	%	±%
Conservative	Richard Duffield	468	70.9	
Labour	Michael Bennett	192	29.1	
Majority		276	41.8	
Turnout		660	38.0	
Registered electors		1,736		
Conservative hold		Swing		

=== Templar ===
Templar
Party	Candidate	Votes	%	±%
Conservative	John Rogers*	394	78.2	
Labour	Christopher Walls	110	21.8	
Majority		284	56.4	
Turnout		504	29.0	
Registered electors		1,742		
Conservative hold		Swing		

=== Thetford-Abbey ===
Thetford-Abbey (2 seats)
Party	Candidate	Votes	%	±%
Labour	Thelma Paines*	349	58.6	
Labour	Albert Paines*	317	53.2	
Conservative	Michael Spencer	268	45.0	
Turnout		~596	18.0	
Registered electors		3,310		
Labour hold				
Labour hold				

=== Thetford-Castle ===
Thetford-Castle
Party	Candidate	Votes	%
Independent	Terence Lamb*	185	39.1
Labour	Colin Armes*	106	22.4
Liberal Democrats	Daniel Jeffrey	93	19.7
Conservative	David Curtis	89	18.8
Majority		79	16.7
Turnout		473	31.0
Registered electors		1,547	
Independent win (new seat)			

=== Thetford-Guildhall ===
Thetford-Guildhall (3 seats)
Party	Candidate	Votes	%	±%
Conservative	Derek Mortimer*	494	47.6	
Conservative	Robert Kybird	448	43.2	
Conservative	Pamela Spencer	435	41.9	
Labour	Sylvia Armes*	385	37.1	
Labour	David Curzon-Berners*	291	28.0	
Liberal Democrats	Martin Rouse	257	24.8	
Labour	Francis Duffy	240	23.1	
Turnout		~1,038	22.0	
Registered electors		4,718		
Conservative hold				
Conservative gain from Independent				
Conservative gain from Labour				

=== Thetford-Saxon ===
Thetford-Saxon (3 seats)
Party	Candidate	Votes	%	±%
Labour	Raymond Key	436	50.5	
Conservative	Marion Chapman-Allen	430	49.8	
Labour	Jack Ramm*	391	45.3	
Labour	Dennis Sully	332	38.5	
Turnout		~863	17.0	
Registered electors		5,077		
Labour hold				
Conservative gain from Labour				
Labour win (new seat)				

=== Two Rivers ===
Two Rivers (2 seats)
Party	Candidate	Votes	%	±%
Conservative	Brian Rose*	712	65.3	
Conservative	Paul Claussen*	629	57.7	
Labour	Carol Warman	366	33.6	
Labour	Janice Smith	346	31.7	
Turnout		~1,090	35.0	
Registered electors		3,114		
Conservative hold				
Conservative win (new seat)				

=== Upper Wensum ===
Upper Wensum
Party	Candidate	Votes	%	±%
Conservative	Charles Cathcart	558	71.4	
Labour	Roger Fryatt	224	28.6	
Majority		334	42.7	
Turnout		782	46.0	
Registered electors		1,740		
Conservative hold				

=== Upper Yare ===
Upper Yare
Party	Candidate	Votes	%	±%
Conservative	Clifton Jordan*	524	76.3	
Labour	Benjamin Macann	163	23.7	
Majority		361	52.5	
Turnout		687	39.0	
Registered electors		1,774		
Conservative hold				

=== Watton ===
Watton (3 seats)
Party	Candidate	Votes	%	±%
Conservative	Roy Rudling*	1,002	72.2	
Conservative	David Wickham*	800	57.6	
Independent	Keith Gilbert*	580	41.8	
Labour	Gary Greenwood	364	26.2	
Turnout		~1,388	27.0	
Registered electors		5,142		
Conservative hold				
Conservative hold				
Independent gain from Liberal Democrats				

=== Wayland ===
Wayland
Party	Candidate	Votes	%	±%
Conservative	John Cowen	Unopposed		
Registered electors		1,669		
Conservative hold				

=== Weeting ===
Weeting
Party	Candidate	Votes	%	±%
Independent	Sheila Childerhouse*	569	95.0	
Liberal Democrats	Barry Green	30	5.0	
Majority		539	90.0	
Turnout		599	36.0	
Registered electors		1,696		
Independent hold				

=== West Guiltcross ===
West Guiltcross
Party	Candidate	Votes	%	±%
Conservative	John Nunn*	339	50.1	
Liberal Democrats	Stephen Gordon	276	40.8	
Green	Peter Maxey	62	9.2	
Majority		63	9.3	
Turnout		677	41.0	
Registered electors		1,646		
Conservative hold				

=== Wissey ===
Wissey
Party	Candidate	Votes	%	±%
Conservative	Jill Ball*	484	66.9	
Green	Christine Dack	239	33.1	
Majority		245	33.9	
Turnout		723	38.0	
Registered electors		1,907		
Conservative hold				
