= 1987 Breckland District Council election =

1987 English local election

- 7 May 1987

All 53 seats to Breckland District Council 27 seats needed for a majority

	First party	Second party
Party	Conservative	Independent
Seats won	33	11
Seat change	▲8	▼8
Popular vote	24,478	6,351
Percentage	49.4%	12.8%
Swing	▲13.5%	▼13.8%
	Third party	Fourth party
Party	Labour	Alliance
Seats won	7	2
Seat change	▼1	▲1
Popular vote	10,872	7,882
Percentage	21.9%	15.9%
Swing	▼5.2%	▲5.5%
- Winner of each seat at the 1987 Breckland District Council election.
Control before election
No overall control
Control after election
Conservative

The 1987 Breckland District Council election took place on 7 May 1987 to elect members of Breckland District Council in Norfolk, England. This was on the same day as other local elections.

== Summary ==
=== Election result ===
1987 Breckland District Council election
Party	Candidates	Seats	Gains	Losses	Net gain/loss	Seats %	Votes %	Votes	+/−
Conservative	41	33	9	1	▲8	62.3	49.4	24,478	+13.5
Independent	17	11	1	9	▼8	20.8	12.8	6,351	–13.8
Labour	41	7	1	0	▼1	13.2	21.9	10,872	–5.2
Alliance	28	2	2	1	▲1	3.8	15.9	7,882	+5.5

== Ward results ==
Incumbent councillors standing for re-election are marked with an asterisk (*). Changes in seats do not take into account by-elections or defections.

=== All Saints ===
All Saints
Party	Candidate	Votes	%	±%
Conservative	E. Southgate*	488	77.0	
Labour	M. Wingfield	146	23.0	
Majority		342	54.0	
Turnout		634	41.7	
Registered electors		1,520		
Conservative hold		Swing		

=== Beetley & Gressenhall ===
Beetley & Gressenhall
Party	Candidate	Votes	%	±%
Conservative	I. Howard*	518	59.8	
Alliance	C. Billingham	348	40.2	
Majority		170	19.6	
Turnout		866	53.8	
Registered electors		1,611		
Conservative hold		Swing		

=== Besthorpe ===
Besthorpe
Party	Candidate	Votes	%	±%
Conservative	K. Martin*	465	57.3	
Alliance	E. Serpell	180	22.2	
Labour	W. Cudd	166	20.5	
Majority		285	35.1	
Turnout		811	44.8	
Registered electors		1,812		
Conservative hold		Swing		

=== Buckenham ===
Buckenham
Party	Candidate	Votes	%	±%
Conservative	J. Marsh*	468	68.2	
Labour	C. Phillips	218	31.8	
Majority		250	36.4	
Turnout		686	54.2	
Registered electors		1,265		
Conservative hold		Swing		

=== Conifer ===
Conifer
Party	Candidate	Votes	%	±%
Conservative	D. Bryan	627	71.5	
Alliance	C. Truscott	157	17.9	
Labour	C. Noble	93	10.6	
Majority		470	53.6	
Turnout		877	52.0	
Registered electors		1,687		
Conservative gain from Independent		Swing		

=== East Dereham Neatherd ===
East Dereham Neatherd (2 seats)
Party	Candidate	Votes	%	±%
Conservative	M. Duigan*	713	57.1	
Conservative	G. Whitworth*	604	48.4	
Alliance	B. Gooch	298	23.9	
Alliance	P. Johnstone	276	22.1	
Labour	J. Copsey	238	19.1	
Labour	W. McBeath	216	17.3	
Turnout		~1,249	44.6	
Registered electors		2,802		
Conservative hold				
Conservative hold				

=== East Dereham St. Withburga ===
East Dereham St. Withburga
Party	Candidate	Votes	%	±%
Conservative	M. Monument	387	51.9	
Labour	S. Nurse	213	28.6	
Alliance	M. Billingham	145	19.5	
Majority		174	23.4	
Turnout		745	45.9	
Registered electors		1,622		
Conservative hold		Swing		

=== East Dereham Toftwood ===
East Dereham Toftwood (2 seats)
Party	Candidate	Votes	%	±%
Conservative	M. Fanthorpe*	857	46.1	
Alliance	J. Barnes	707	38.1	
Conservative	R. Shelton	696	37.5	
Alliance	D. Vaughan	426	22.9	
Labour	K. Potter	292	15.7	
Labour	A. Harvey	257	13.8	
Turnout		~1,858	51.4	
Registered electors		3,614		
Conservative hold				
Alliance gain from Conservative				

=== East Dereham Town ===
East Dereham Town (2 seats)
Party	Candidate	Votes	%	±%
Labour	L. Potter*	665	51.2	
Labour	R. Potter*	460	35.4	
Conservative	D. Gamble	394	30.3	
Conservative	M. Swetman	282	21.7	
Alliance	R. Crane	241	18.6	
Turnout		~1,299	57.4	
Registered electors		2,263		
Labour hold				
Labour hold				

=== East Guiltcross ===
East Guiltcross
Party	Candidate	Votes	%	±%
Independent	K. Simpson*	407	79.5	
Labour	J. Kirk	105	20.5	
Majority		302	59.0	
Turnout		512	41.9	
Registered electors		1,223		
Independent hold		Swing		

=== Eynsford ===
Eynsford
Party	Candidate	Votes	%	±%
Conservative	D. Sayer	330	54.9	
Alliance	S. Cargill	271	45.1	
Majority		59	9.8	
Turnout		601	47.1	
Registered electors		1,275		
Conservative hold		Swing		

=== Haggard De Toni ===
Haggard De Toni
Party	Candidate	Votes	%	±%
Conservative	K. Jelly*	664	79.2	
Labour	C. Alderson	174	20.8	
Majority		490	58.4	
Turnout		838	51.7	
Registered electors		1,621		
Conservative hold		Swing		

=== Harling ===
Harling
Party	Candidate	Votes	%	±%
Conservative	K. Bulkeley*	416	54.5	
Alliance	D. Grunbaum	226	29.6	
Labour	A. Hanson	121	15.9	
Majority		190	24.9	
Turnout		763	50.0	
Registered electors		1,527		
Conservative gain from Independent		Swing		

=== Haverscroft ===
Haverscroft
Party	Candidate	Votes	%	±%
Conservative	P. Shaw*	465	59.2	
Labour	P. Cusack	175	22.3	
Alliance	T. Desborough	145	18.5	
Majority		290	36.9	
Turnout		785	49.1	
Registered electors		1,600		
Conservative hold		Swing		

=== Heathlands ===
Heathlands
Party	Candidate	Votes	%	±%
Conservative	D. Sheppard	407	69.1	
Alliance	G. Bones	104	17.7	
Labour	S. Kincaid	78	13.2	
Majority		303	51.4	
Turnout		589	45.4	
Registered electors		1,296		
Conservative hold		Swing		

=== Hermitage ===
Hermitage
Party	Candidate	Votes	%	±%
Conservative	J. Birkbeck*	438	66.4	
Alliance	P. Pollicott-Reid	222	33.6	
Majority		216	32.8	
Turnout		660	56.5	
Registered electors		1,169		
Conservative hold		Swing		

=== Launditch ===
Launditch
Party	Candidate	Votes	%	±%
Independent	R. Butler-Stoney*	Unopposed		
Registered electors		1,248		
Independent hold				

=== Mattishall ===
Mattishall
Party	Candidate	Votes	%	±%
Conservative	D. Pearson*	520	62.7	
Alliance	J. Harvey	310	37.3	
Majority		210	25.4	
Turnout		830	44.5	
Registered electors		1,864		
Conservative gain from Independent		Swing		

=== Mid Forest ===
Mid Forest
Party	Candidate	Votes	%	±%
Conservative	S. Steward*	289	51.4	
Independent	M. Pollard	174	31.0	
Labour	M. Graves	99	17.6	
Majority		115	20.4	
Turnout		562	58.8	
Registered electors		956		
Conservative hold		Swing		

=== Nar Valley ===
Nar Valley
Party	Candidate	Votes	%	±%
Labour	M. Boddy*	Unopposed		
Registered electors		1,740		
Labour hold				

=== Necton ===
Necton
Party	Candidate	Votes	%	±%
Conservative	J. Bowcock*	537	76.8	
Labour	J. Scholey	162	23.2	
Majority		375	53.6	
Turnout		699	48.4	
Registered electors		1,443		
Conservative gain from Independent		Swing		

=== Peddars Way ===
Peddars Way
Party	Candidate	Votes	%	±%
Conservative	S. Steyerman*	521	78.9	
Labour	A. Paines	139	21.1	
Majority		382	57.8	
Turnout		660	45.1	
Registered electors		1,465		
Conservative gain from Independent		Swing		

=== Queens ===
Queens
Party	Candidate	Votes	%	±%
Conservative	T. Byford*	660	77.8	
Labour	L. Walsh	188	22.2	
Majority		472	55.6	
Turnout		848	31.8	
Registered electors		2,664		
Conservative hold		Swing		

=== Shipworth ===
Shipworth
Party	Candidate	Votes	%	±%
Independent	A. Matthews*	Unopposed		
Registered electors		1,885		
Independent hold				

=== Springvale ===
Springvale
Party	Candidate	Votes	%	±%
Conservative	M. Mallon	351	56.4	
Labour	S. Brown	156	25.1	
Alliance	M. Reavey	115	18.5	
Majority		195	31.3	
Turnout		622	41.7	
Registered electors		1,490		
Conservative hold		Swing		

=== Swaffham ===
Swaffham (3 seats)
Party	Candidate	Votes	%	±%
Conservative	P. Ison*	1,160	43.3	
Independent	J. Sampson*	965	36.0	
Independent	T. Wilding*	780	29.1	
Labour	B. Marjoram	556	20.7	
Labour	F. Williamson	418	15.6	
Labour	A. Drake	389	14.5	
Independent	M. Ward	323	12.1	
Independent	F. Smith	312	11.6	
Turnout		~2,680	61.3	
Registered electors		4,374		
Conservative gain from Independent				
Independent hold				
Independent hold				

=== Swanton Morley ===
Swanton Morley
Party	Candidate	Votes	%	±%
Conservative	J. Johnson*	494	69.9	
Alliance	K. Murrell	213	30.1	
Majority		281	39.8	
Turnout		707	48.3	
Registered electors		1,463		
Conservative hold		Swing		

=== Taverner ===
Taverner
Party	Candidate	Votes	%	±%
Alliance	D. Rose	382	54.6	
Conservative	P. Jeffery	317	45.4	
Majority		65	9.2	
Turnout		699	62.5	
Registered electors		1,118		
Alliance gain from Independent		Swing		

=== Templar ===
Templar
Party	Candidate	Votes	%	±%
Conservative	R. Buscall*	374	80.6	
Labour	C. Lindsay	90	19.4	
Majority		284	61.2	
Turnout		464	50.8	
Registered electors		913		
Conservative hold		Swing		

=== Thetford Abbey ===
Thetford Abbey (2 seats)
Party	Candidate	Votes	%	±%
Conservative	P. Pearson	593	34.5	
Labour	T. Paines*	574	33.4	
Conservative	J. Peers	560	32.5	
Alliance	F. Attfield*	552	32.1	
Alliance	W. Thorne	422	24.5	
Turnout		~1,721	49.2	
Registered electors		3,497		
Conservative gain from Alliance				
Labour hold				

=== Thetford Barnham Cross ===
Thetford Barnham Cross (2 seats)
Party	Candidate	Votes	%	±%
Labour	C. Armes*	635	52.6	
Labour	J. Ramm*	603	49.9	
Conservative	H. Parberry	381	31.5	
Conservative	R. Downs	379	31.4	
Alliance	W. Ruxton	191	15.8	
Turnout		~1,208	44.0	
Registered electors		2,745		
Labour hold				
Labour hold				

=== Thetford Guildhall ===
Thetford Guildhall (3 seats)
Party	Candidate	Votes	%	±%
Conservative	D. Sawyer*	1,165	58.9	
Conservative	F. Kew*	1,154	58.3	
Conservative	F. Wilkes*	1,112	56.2	
Alliance	J. Fadden	456	23.0	
Alliance	M. Rouse	395	20.0	
Labour	R. Key	357	18.0	
Labour	P. Barker	345	17.4	
Labour	C. Linton	301	15.2	
Turnout		~1,979	40.9	
Registered electors		4,840		
Conservative hold				
Conservative hold				
Conservative hold				

=== Thetford Saxon ===
Thetford Saxon (2 seats)
Party	Candidate	Votes	%	±%
Independent	T. Lamb	557	36.8	
Labour	F. Room*	523	34.5	
Labour	K. Key*	492	32.5	
Conservative	N. Lister	434	28.7	
Turnout		~1,514	59.2	
Registered electors		2,558		
Independent gain from Labour				
Labour hold				

=== Two Rivers ===
Two Rivers
Party	Candidate	Votes	%	±%
Conservative	J. Abbs*	509	58.4	
Alliance	C. Harvey	362	41.6	
Majority		147	16.8	
Turnout		871	57.1	
Registered electors		1,525		
Conservative gain from Independent		Swing		

=== Upper Wensum ===
Upper Wensum
Party	Candidate	Votes	%	±%
Independent	G. Kerrison*	583	72.2	
Independent	H. Clarke	125	15.5	
Alliance	C. King	100	12.4	
Majority		458	56.7	
Turnout		808	56.4	
Registered electors		1,432		
Independent hold		Swing		

=== Upper Yare ===
Upper Yare
Party	Candidate	Votes	%	±%
Independent	L. Brown*	335	58.4	
Alliance	P. Kinder	239	41.6	
Majority		96	16.8	
Turnout		574	41.6	
Registered electors		1,379		
Independent hold		Swing		

=== Watton ===
Watton (3 seats)
Party	Candidate	Votes	%	±%
Conservative	R. Rudling*	1,328	41.7	
Independent	C. Cadman*	1,303	40.9	
Conservative	G. Mitchell*	1,282	40.2	
Alliance	C. Walford	300	9.4	
Labour	C. Ball	256	8.0	
Labour	R. Barker	179	5.6	
Labour	F. O'Connor	151	4.7	
Independent	R. Borland	83	2.6	
Turnout		~3,186	75.1	
Registered electors		4,242		
Conservative hold				
Independent hold				
Conservative hold				

=== Wayland ===
Wayland
Party	Candidate	Votes	%	±%
Conservative	E. Morfoot*	578	71.7	
Labour	G. Bailey	228	28.3	
Majority		350	43.4	
Turnout		806	63.8	
Registered electors		1,264		
Conservative hold		Swing		

=== Weeting ===
Weeting
Party	Candidate	Votes	%	±%
Independent	S. Childerhouse*	450	68.3	
Labour	S. Drewry	110	16.7	
Alliance	R. Green	99	15.0	
Majority		340	51.6	
Turnout		659	48.9	
Registered electors		1,347		
Independent hold		Swing		

=== West Guiltcross ===
West Guiltcross
Party	Candidate	Votes	%	±%
Independent	M. Mansbridge*	471	76.1	
Labour	F. Quarterman	148	23.9	
Majority		323	52.2	
Turnout		619	45.2	
Registered electors		1,369		
Independent hold		Swing		

=== Wissey ===
Wissey
Party	Candidate	Votes	%	±%
Conservative	D. Ralli	551	52.0	
Independent	F. Daynes	352	33.2	
Labour	L. Watkins	156	14.7	
Majority		199	18.8	
Turnout		1,059	56.1	
Registered electors		1,888		
Conservative gain from Independent		Swing		

== By-elections ==
=== Nar Valley ===
Nar Valley by-election: 17 December 1987
Party	Candidate	Votes	%	±%
Labour		299	54.7	
Conservative		248	45.3	
Majority		51	9.3	
Turnout		547	15.0	
Registered electors		3,647		
Labour hold		Swing		

=== Haverscroft ===
Haverscroft by-election: 4 May 1989
Party	Candidate	Votes	%	±%
Conservative		469	67.2	
Labour		229	32.8	
Majority		240	34.4	
Turnout		698	42.9	
Registered electors		1,627		
Conservative hold		Swing		

=== Thetford Saxon ===
Thetford Saxon by-election: 4 May 1989
Party	Candidate	Votes	%	±%
Labour		513	56.7	
Conservative		280	31.0	
Liberal Democrats		111	12.3	
Majority		233	25.8	
Turnout		904	34.8	
Registered electors		2,598		
Labour hold		Swing		

=== Peddars Way ===
Peddars Way by-election: 10 May 1990
Party	Candidate	Votes	%	±%
Conservative		Unopposed		
Registered electors		N/A		
Conservative hold				
