= 1973 Breckland District Council election =

1973 English local government election

- 10 May 1973

All 51 seats to Breckland District Council 26 seats needed for a majority

	First party	Second party
Party	Conservative	Independent
Seats won	20	20
Popular vote	16,002	9,963
Percentage	39.6%	24.6%
	Third party	Fourth party
Party	Labour	Ind. Conservative
Seats won	10	1
Popular vote	13,954	318
Percentage	34.5%	0.8%
Control after election
No overall control

The 1973 Breckland District Council election took place on 10 May 1973 to elect members of Breckland District Council in Norfolk, England. This was on the same day as other local elections.

This was the inaugural election of Breckland District Council following its creation by the Local Government Act 1972.

== Summary ==
=== Election result ===
1973 Breckland District Council election
Party	Candidates	Seats	Gains	Losses	Net gain/loss	Seats %	Votes %	Votes	+/−
Conservative	34	20	N/A	N/A	N/A	39.2	39.6	16,002	N/A
Independent	34	20	N/A	N/A	N/A	41.2	24.6	9,963	N/A
Labour	31	10	N/A	N/A	N/A	19.6	34.5	13,954	N/A
Ind. Conservative	1	1	N/A	N/A	N/A	0.0	0.8	318	N/A
Residents	1	0	N/A	N/A	N/A	0.0	0.3	107	N/A
Liberal	1	0	N/A	N/A	N/A	0.0	0.2	92	N/A

== Ward results ==
Incumbent councillors standing for re-election are marked with an asterisk (*). Changes in seats do not take into account by-elections or defections.

=== All Saints ===
All Saints
Party	Candidate	Votes	%
Independent	A. Harvey	374	61.6
Labour	F. Towell	232	38.3
Majority		142	23.3
Turnout		607	49.9
Registered electors		1,214	
Independent win (new seat)			

=== Beetley & Gressenhall ===
Beetley & Gressenhall
Party	Candidate	Votes	%
Conservative	I. Howard	Unopposed	
Registered electors		1,093	
Conservative win (new seat)			

=== Buckenham ===
Buckenham
Party	Candidate	Votes	%
Ind. Conservative	E. Macro	318	70.7
Labour	R. Phillips	132	29.3
Majority		186	41.4
Turnout		450	45.6
Registered electors		986	
Ind. Conservative win (new seat)			

=== Conifer ===
Conifer
Party	Candidate	Votes	%
Independent	W. Emms	269	55.0
Independent	H. Lawrence	220	45.0
Majority		49	10.0
Turnout		489	41.5
Registered electors		1,178	
Independent win (new seat)			

=== East Guiltcross ===
East Guiltcross
Party	Candidate	Votes	%
Independent	G. Aldridge	199	46.8
Independent	F. Riches	110	25.9
Labour	M. Goatcher	93	21.9
Independent	S. Robinson	23	5.4
Majority		89	20.9
Turnout		425	40.9
Registered electors		1,039	
Independent win (new seat)			

=== Eynsford ===
Eynsford
Party	Candidate	Votes	%
Conservative	J. Hatley	Unopposed	
Registered electors		1,012	
Conservative win (new seat)			

=== Haggard De Toni ===
Haggard De Toni
Party	Candidate	Votes	%
Independent	H. Wells-Cole	Unopposed	
Registered electors		1,242	
Independent win (new seat)			

=== Harling ===
Harling
Party	Candidate	Votes	%
Conservative	R. Kemp	Unopposed	
Registered electors		1,156	
Conservative win (new seat)			

=== Heathlands ===
Heathlands
Party	Candidate	Votes	%
Independent	R. Musker	Unopposed	
Registered electors		982	
Independent win (new seat)			

=== Hermitage ===
Hermitage
Party	Candidate	Votes	%
Conservative	J. Birkbeck	244	71.3
Labour	E. Whitmore	98	28.7
Majority		146	42.6
Turnout		342	30.0
Registered electors		1,139	
Conservative win (new seat)			

=== Launditch ===
Launditch
Party	Candidate	Votes	%
Independent	R. Butler-Stoney	Unopposed	
Registered electors		985	
Independent win (new seat)			

=== Mattishall ===
Mattishall
Party	Candidate	Votes	%
Conservative	C. Knight	282	55.8
Independent	E. James	223	44.2
Majority		59	11.7
Turnout		505	34.4
Registered electors		1,466	
Conservative win (new seat)			

=== Mid Forest ===
Mid Forest
Party	Candidate	Votes	%
Independent	S. Steward	303	62.1
Labour	S. Brundle	185	37.9
Majority		118	24.2
Turnout		488	50.7
Registered electors		962	
Independent win (new seat)			

=== Nar Valley ===
Nar Valley
Party	Candidate	Votes	%
Labour	M. Boddy	358	58.3
Independent	A. Fountaine	256	41.7
Majority		102	16.6
Turnout		614	43.9
Registered electors		1,400	
Labour win (new seat)			

=== Necton ===
Necton
Party	Candidate	Votes	%
Conservative	L. Bengeyfield	391	62.3
Labour	A. Arthures	237	37.7
Majority		154	24.5
Turnout		628	63.8
Registered electors		985	
Conservative win (new seat)			

=== No. 26 (Attleborough) ===
No. 26 (Attleborough) (3 seats)
Party	Candidate	Votes	%
Independent	H. Underwood	539	41.0
Independent	E. West	478	36.4
Conservative	G. Alston	435	33.1
Conservative	E. Hornegold	341	26.0
Labour	G. Gillan	234	17.8
Labour	H. Wilson	209	15.9
Residents	A. Lake	107	8.1
Turnout		~1,314	36.1
Registered electors		3,639	
Independent win (new seat)			
Independent win (new seat)			
Conservative win (new seat)			

=== No. 5 (East Dereham) ===
No. 5 (East Dereham) (7 seats)
Party	Candidate	Votes	%
Conservative	L. Floering	1,615	51.9
Labour	L. Potter	1,495	48.1
Conservative	O. Jarvis	1,472	47.4
Conservative	C. Wright	1,452	46.7
Conservative	J. Duigan	1,397	44.9
Conservative	M. Duigan	1,366	43.9
Conservative	R. Shelton	1,290	41.5
Conservative	G. Whitworth	1,162	37.4
Labour	J. Walpole	1,108	35.6
Labour	R. Potter	1,095	35.2
Labour	A. Harvey	877	28.2
Labour	E. Guymer	861	27.7
Labour	J. Beales	847	27.3
Labour	A. Eve	840	27.0
Turnout		~3,109	41.4
Registered electors		7,508	
Conservative win (new seat)			
Labour win (new seat)			
Conservative win (new seat)			
Conservative win (new seat)			
Conservative win (new seat)			
Conservative win (new seat)			
Conservative win (new seat)			

=== Peddars Way ===
Peddars Way
Party	Candidate	Votes	%
Independent	H. Baker	299	62.9
Conservative	D. Trappes-Lomax	176	37.1
Majority		123	25.9
Turnout		475	41.1
Registered electors		1,155	
Independent win (new seat)			

=== Shipworth ===
Shipworth
Party	Candidate	Votes	%
Conservative	J. Jesson	313	45.0
Labour	J. Edwards	197	28.3
Independent	E. Adcock	185	26.6
Majority		116	16.7
Turnout		695	44.5
Registered electors		1,562	
Conservative win (new seat)			

=== Springvale ===
Springvale
Party	Candidate	Votes	%
Conservative	R. Wright	282	55.8
Independent	E. James	223	44.2
Majority		59	11.7
Turnout		505	45.4
Registered electors		1,113	
Conservative win (new seat)			

=== Swaffham ===
Swaffham (3 seats)
Party	Candidate	Votes	%
Independent	J. Ison	849	42.5
Labour	B. Marjoram	734	36.7
Independent	J. Sampson	732	36.6
Independent	T. Wilding	627	31.4
Conservative	D. Eldridge	414	20.7
Conservative	C. Phillips	365	18.3
Turnout		~1,998	60.9
Registered electors		3,280	
Independent win (new seat)			
Labour win (new seat)			
Independent win (new seat)			

=== Swanton Morley ===
Swanton Morley
Party	Candidate	Votes	%
Conservative	J. Johnson	Unopposed	
Registered electors		1,079	
Conservative win (new seat)			

=== Taverner ===
Taverner
Party	Candidate	Votes	%
Conservative	A. Spinks	218	55.8
Independent	E. Stangroom	173	44.2
Majority		45	11.6
Turnout		391	39.6
Registered electors		988	
Conservative win (new seat)			

=== Templar ===
Templar
Party	Candidate	Votes	%
Independent	A. Askew	233	68.3
Labour	L. Howe	108	31.7
Majority		125	36.6
Turnout		341	42.2
Registered electors		808	
Independent win (new seat)			

=== Thetford Abbey ===
Thetford Abbey (2 seats)
Party	Candidate	Votes	%
Labour	H. Crampton	327	61.0
Labour	J. Woolgar	316	59.0
Conservative	A. Smith	209	39.0
Conservative	T. Fanthorpe	167	31.2
Turnout		~536	26.0
Registered electors		2,060	
Labour win (new seat)			
Labour win (new seat)			

=== Thetford Barnham Cross ===
Thetford Barnham Cross (2 seats)
Party	Candidate	Votes	%
Labour	K. Grant	484	74.3
Labour	D. Hillier	473	72.6
Conservative	K. Balaam	167	25.7
Conservative	D. Perkins	146	22.5
Turnout		~652	26.3
Registered electors		2,480	
Labour win (new seat)			
Labour win (new seat)			

=== Thetford Guildhall ===
Thetford Guildhall (2 seats)
Party	Candidate	Votes	%
Independent	B. Culey	504	44.3
Independent	T. Lamb	385	33.8
Labour	C. Armes	324	28.5
Conservative	G. Kybird	310	27.3
Labour	W. Nunn	265	23.3
Conservative	L. Broadhurst	246	21.6
Turnout		~1,139	49.2
Registered electors		2,315	
Independent win (new seat)			
Independent win (new seat)			

=== Thetford Saxon ===
Thetford Saxon (2 seats)
Party	Candidate	Votes	%
Labour	F. Room	605	67.9
Labour	J. Sweeney	570	64.0
Conservative	M. Sutherland	286	32.1
Conservative	W. Soper	249	27.9
Turnout		~890	34.5
Registered electors		2,579	
Labour win (new seat)			
Labour win (new seat)			

=== Two Rivers ===
Two Rivers
Party	Candidate	Votes	%
Conservative	G. Dann	245	53.4
Independent	P. Musk	214	46.6
Majority		31	6.8
Turnout		459	40.5
Registered electors		1,134	
Conservative win (new seat)			

=== Upper Wensum ===
Upper Wensum
Party	Candidate	Votes	%
Independent	G. Kerrison	462	64.0
Conservative	E. Barrett	191	26.5
Labour	G. Barnard	69	9.6
Majority		271	37.5
Turnout		722	56.2
Registered electors		1,285	
Independent win (new seat)			

=== Upper Yare ===
Upper Yare
Party	Candidate	Votes	%
Independent	L. Brown	Unopposed	
Registered electors		1,242	
Independent win (new seat)			

=== Watton ===
Watton (2 seats)
Party	Candidate	Votes	%
Independent	G. Mitchell	721	59.0
Independent	M. Parker	468	38.3
Conservative	D. Bishop	292	23.9
Labour	C. Cadman	209	17.1
Labour	J. Take	192	15.7
Independent	A. Neaves	110	9.0
Turnout		~1,223	46.9
Registered electors		2,607	
Independent win (new seat)			
Independent win (new seat)			

=== Wayland ===
Wayland
Party	Candidate	Votes	%
Labour	G. Bailey	180	51.3
Independent	D. Thornhill	171	48.7
Majority		9	2.6
Turnout		351	36.2
Registered electors		970	
Labour win (new seat)			

=== Weeting ===
Weeting
Party	Candidate	Votes	%
Independent	N. Parrott	366	79.9
Liberal	R. Green	92	20.1
Majority		274	59.8
Turnout		458	47.2
Registered electors		971	
Independent win (new seat)			

=== West Guiltcross ===
West Guiltcross
Party	Candidate	Votes	%
Independent	M. Mansbridge	Unopposed	
Registered electors		1,234	
Independent win (new seat)			

=== Wissey ===
Wissey
Party	Candidate	Votes	%
Conservative	E. Bulling	279	53.0
Independent	C. Kneeshaw	247	47.0
Majority		32	6.0
Turnout		526	39.4
Registered electors		1,334	
Conservative win (new seat)			
