= Kempson =

Kempson is a surname. Notable people with the surname include:

- Darran Kempson (born 1984), English professional footballer
- Edwin Kempson (1862–1931), the second Suffragan Bishop of Warrington
- Edwin Garnett Hone Kempson (1902–1987) British mountaineer
- F. R. Kempson (1838–1923), English architect
- James Kempson (1742–1822), English choirmaster
- Julie Hart Beers Kempson (1835–1913), American painter better known as Julie Hart Beers
- Lily Kempson (1897–1996), Irish trade union activist and rebel
- Matthews Kempson (1831–1894), English educationalist and cricketer
- Rachel Kempson (1910–2003), English actress
- Ruth Kempson (born 1944), British linguist
- Sibyl Kempson (born 1973), American playwright, and performer
- William Kempson (1835–1877), English soldier and cricketer

== See also ==
- Empson
- Kempston
- Kempstone
