= Kempstone (disambiguation) =

Kempstone is a village in Norfolk, England.

Kempstone may also refer to:

- Thomas Kempstone, an MP for Ipswich, England in 1421
- Kempstone Hill, a landform in Aberdeenshire, Scotland

== See also ==
- Kempson, a surname
