= 2019 King's Lynn and West Norfolk Borough Council election =

- 2 May 2019

All 55 seats to King's Lynn and West Norfolk Borough Council 28 seats needed for a majority

	First party	Second party	Third party
Party	Conservative	Independent	Labour
Last election	50 seats, 50.4%	2 seats, 6.0%	10 seats, 16.0%
Seats won	28	15	10
Seat change	▼23	▲13	Steady
Popular vote	23,549	12,917	8,158
Percentage	48.2%	26.4%	16.7%
Swing	▼2.2%	▲20.4%	▲0.7%
	Fourth party	Fifth party
Party	Green	Liberal Democrats
Last election	0 seats, 4.0%	0 seats, 1.5%
Seats won	1	1
Seat change	▲1	▲1
Popular vote	1,942	994
Percentage	4.0%	2.0%
Swing	0.0%	▲0.5%
- Winner of each seat at the 2019 King's Lynn and West Norfolk Borough Council election
Council control before election
Conservative
Council control after election
Conservative

The 2019 King's Lynn & West Norfolk Borough Council election took place on 2 May 2019 to elect members of King's Lynn & West Norfolk Borough Council in Norfolk, England. This was on the same day as other local elections.

== Summary ==
=== Election results ===
2019 King's Lynn & West Norfolk Borough Council election
Party	Candidates	Seats	Gains	Losses	Net gain/loss	Seats %	Votes %	Votes	+/−
Conservative	54	28	N/A	N/A	▼22	50.9	47.5	23,592	–6.9
Independent	28	15	N/A	N/A	▲13	27.3	26.8	13,305	+20.3
Labour	30	10	N/A	N/A	Steady	18.2	17.1	8,492	–1.0
Green	5	1	N/A	N/A	▲1	1.8	3.9	1,942	+0.4
Liberal Democrats	5	1	N/A	N/A	▲1	1.8	2.0	994	+0.6
UKIP	6	0	N/A	N/A	Steady	0.0	2.6	1,315	–13.4

== Ward results ==
=== Airfield ===
Airfield
Party	Candidate	Votes	%	±%
Independent	Mike Howland	781	63.7	
Conservative	Geoffrey Hipperson	608	49.6	
Conservative	Matt Sawyer	307	25.0	
Majority				
Turnout				
Independent gain from Conservative		Swing		
Conservative hold		Swing		

=== Bircham with Rudhams ===
Bircham with Rudhams
Party	Candidate	Votes	%
Independent	Chris Morley	426	52.0
Conservative	Michael Chenery	393	48.0
Majority			
Turnout			
Independent win (new seat)			

=== Brancaster ===
Brancaster
Party	Candidate	Votes	%	±%
Independent	Bob Lawton	455	54.3	
Conservative	Alistair Beales	383	45.7	
Majority				
Turnout				
Independent gain from Conservative		Swing		

=== Burnham Market & Docking ===
Burnham Market & Docking
Party	Candidate	Votes	%
Conservative	Sam Sandell	425	61.5
Independent	Simon Bower	266	38.5
Majority			
Turnout			
Conservative win (new seat)			

=== Clenchwarton ===
Clenchwarton
Party	Candidate	Votes	%	±%
Conservative	David Whitby	416	47.3	
Independent	Matthew Hannay	347	39.4	
Labour	Gary Branham	117	13.3	
Majority				
Turnout				
Conservative hold		Swing		

=== Denver ===
Denver
Party	Candidate	Votes	%
Independent	Alan Holmes	375	58.9
Conservative	Tony White	262	41.1
Majority			
Turnout			
Independent win (new seat)			

=== Dersingham ===
Dersingham
Party	Candidate	Votes	%	±%
Conservative	Tony Bubb	1,025	65.9	
Conservative	Judy Collingham	979	63.0	
Labour	Yvonne Anderson	445	28.6	
Labour	Jordan Stokes	352	22.6	
Majority				
Turnout				
Conservative hold		Swing		
Conservative hold		Swing		

=== Downham Old Town ===
Downham Old Town
Party	Candidate	Votes	%	±%
Conservative	Shimit Patel	200	30.7	
Independent	Steve Mackinder	171	26.2	
Labour	Becka Elliott	168	25.8	
Liberal Democrats	Steven White	113	17.3	
Majority				
Turnout				
Conservative hold		Swing		

=== East Downham ===
East Downham
Party	Candidate	Votes	%	±%
Liberal Democrats	Josie Ratcliffe	201	43.0	
Conservative	Jackie Westrop	126	26.9	
Independent	Doug Lawson	73	15.6	
Labour	Jonathan Toye	68	14.5	
Majority				
Turnout				
Liberal Democrats gain from Conservative		Swing		

=== Emneth & Outwell ===
Emneth & Outwell
Party	Candidate	Votes	%
Conservative	Chris Crofts	520	52.3
Conservative	Harry Humphrey	455	45.8
Independent	Yvonne Howard	451	45.4
Labour	Stewart Dickson	139	14.0
Majority			
Turnout			
Conservative win (new seat)			

=== Fairstead ===
Fairstead
Party	Candidate	Votes	%	±%
Labour	Margaret Wilkinson	422	55.0	
Labour	Gary Howman	375	48.9	
UKIP	James Perkins	217	28.3	
Conservative	Michael Taylor	205	26.7	
Majority				
Turnout				
Labour hold		Swing		
Labour hold		Swing		

=== Feltwell ===
Feltwell
Party	Candidate	Votes	%
Conservative	Martin Storey	642	66.9
Conservative	Adrian Lawrence	448	46.7
UKIP	Kenneth Winter	356	37.1
Majority			
Turnout			
Conservative win (new seat)			
Conservative win (new seat)			

=== Gayton & Grimston ===
Gayton & Grimston
Party	Candidate	Votes	%
Green	Andrew De Whalley	742	52.1
Conservative	Colin Manning	618	43.4
Conservative	Sue Fraser	546	38.4
Labour	Gregg Baker	295	20.7
Majority			
Turnout			
Green win (new seat)			
Conservative win (new seat)			

=== Gaywood Chase ===
Gaywood Chase
Party	Candidate	Votes	%	±%
Labour	Christine Hudson	282	58.5	
Conservative	Liam Hind	200	41.5	
Majority				
Turnout				
Labour hold		Swing		

=== Gaywood Clock ===
Gaywood Clock
Party	Candidate	Votes	%
Labour	John Collop	196	41.1
UKIP	Michael Stone	148	31.0
Conservative	Richard Parr	133	27.9
Majority			
Turnout			
Labour win (new seat)			

=== Gaywood North Bank ===
Gaywood North Bank
Party	Candidate	Votes	%	±%
Conservative	Joshua Lowe	524	36.1	
Labour	Sandra Collop	522	36.0	
Conservative	Angie Dickinson	514	35.4	
Independent	Clifford Walters	487	33.5	
Conservative	Mark Shorting	478	32.9	
Labour	Micaela Bartrum	467	32.2	
Labour	Wilf Lambert	466	32.1	
Majority				
Turnout				
Conservative hold		Swing		
Labour gain from Conservative		Swing		
Conservative hold		Swing		

=== Heacham ===
Heacham
Party	Candidate	Votes	%	±%
Independent	Terry Parish	1,178	77.3	
Conservative	Stuart Dark	532	34.9	
Conservative	Adrian Soskin	328	21.5	
Majority				
Turnout				
Independent gain from Conservative		Swing		
Conservative hold		Swing		

=== Hunstanton ===
Hunstanton
Party	Candidate	Votes	%	±%
Conservative	Carol Bower	524	40.7	
Independent	Robert Beal	486	37.8	
Conservative	Amanda Bosworth	457	35.5	
Liberal Democrats	John Crofts	408	31.7	
Independent	Debbie Le May	234	18.2	
Labour	Emilia Rust	208	16.2	
Majority				
Turnout				
Conservative hold		Swing		
Independent hold		Swing		

=== Massingham with Castle Acre ===
Massingham with Castle Acre
Party	Candidate	Votes	%
Independent	Jim Moriarty	690	58.5
Labour	Ed Robb	334	28.3
Conservative	Tim Tilbrook	156	13.2
Majority			
Turnout			
Independent win (new seat)			

=== Methwold ===
Methwold
Party	Candidate	Votes	%
Independent	Alun Ryves	275	44.8
Conservative	Mick Peake	252	41.0
Labour	Sandra McNeill	87	14.2
Majority			
Turnout			
Independent win (new seat)			

=== North Downham ===
North Downham
Party	Candidate	Votes	%	±%
Independent	Andy Bullen	238	37.4	
Conservative	Shaun Blackmur	197	31.0	
Labour	Ben Molyneux-Hetherington	91	14.3	
Liberal Democrats	Sandra Wood	66	10.4	
Green	Eamonn McCusker	44	6.9	
Majority				
Turnout				
Independent gain from Conservative		Swing		

=== North Lynn ===
North Lynn
Party	Candidate	Votes	%	±%
Labour	Ben Jones	388	68.3	
Labour	Andy Tyler	371	65.3	
Conservative	Maxine Tweed	151	26.6	
Conservative	Paul Tweed	134	23.6	
Majority				
Turnout				
Labour hold		Swing		
Labour hold		Swing		

=== Snettisham ===
Snettisham
Party	Candidate	Votes	%	±%
Conservative	Ian Devereux	414	50.2	
Independent	Jan Roomes	411	49.8	
Majority				
Turnout				
Conservative hold		Swing		

=== South & West Lynn ===
South & West Lynn
Party	Candidate	Votes	%	±%
Independent	Alexandra Kemp	536	70.8	
Labour	Charles Jones	379	50.1	
Conservative	Darren Gibson	147	19.4	
Conservative	Steven Middleton	110	14.5	
Majority				
Turnout				
Independent gain from Labour		Swing		
Labour hold		Swing		

=== South Downham ===
South Downham
Party	Candidate	Votes	%	±%
Conservative	Don Tyler	409	57.3	
Liberal Democrats	Brian Redgers	206	28.9	
Labour	Linda Graham	99	13.9	
Majority				
Turnout				
Conservative hold		Swing		

=== Springwood ===
Springwood
Party	Candidate	Votes	%	±%
Labour Co-op	Jo Rust	374	57.2	
Conservative	Nik Mezanov	280	42.8	
Majority				
Turnout				
Labour Co-op gain from Conservative		Swing		

=== St. Margaret's with St. Nicholas ===
St. Margaret's with St. Nicholas
Party	Candidate	Votes	%	±%
Conservative	Lesley Bambridge	356	40.8	
Labour	Francis Bone	327	37.5	
Green	Rob Archer	292	33.5	
Labour	Kelly Terrey	283	32.5	
Conservative	Martins Strals	244	28.0	
Majority				
Turnout				
Conservative hold		Swing		
Labour hold		Swing		

=== Terrington ===
Terrington
Party	Candidate	Votes	%
Conservative	Paul Kunes	677	50.6
Independent	Sandra Squire	638	47.6
UKIP	Trevor Roberts	417	31.1
Conservative	Sheila Young	270	20.2
Majority			
Turnout			
Conservative win (new seat)			
Independent win (new seat)			

=== The Woottons ===
The Woottons
Party	Candidate	Votes	%
Conservative	Elizabeth Nockolds	1,178	54.9
Conservative	Greville Howard	1,089	50.7
Conservative	Graham Middleton	914	42.6
Independent	Paul Bland	903	42.1
Green	Pallavi Devulapalli	522	24.3
Labour	Emily Blake	379	17.7
Labour	Paul Smith	249	11.6
Labour	Peter Smith	245	11.4
Majority			
Turnout			
Conservative win (new seat)			
Conservative win (new seat)			
Conservative win (new seat)			

=== Tilney, Mershe Lande & Wiggenhall ===
Tilney, Mershe Lande & Wiggenhall
Party	Candidate	Votes	%
Conservative	Barry Ayres	512	49.3
Conservative	Brian Long	478	46.1
Independent	Andrew Williams	426	41.0
Independent	Ashley Collins	405	39.0
Majority			
Turnout			
Conservative win (new seat)			
Conservative win (new seat)			

=== Upwell & Delph ===
Upwell & Delph
Party	Candidate	Votes	%	±%
Independent	David Pope	758	57.6	
Independent	Colin Rose	589	44.7	
Conservative	Bill Smith	463	35.2	
Conservative	Matt Gingell	425	32.3	
Majority				
Turnout				
Independent gain from Conservative		Swing		
Independent gain from Conservative		Swing		

=== Walsoken, West Walton & Walpole ===
Walsoken, West Walton & Walpole
Party	Candidate	Votes	%
Conservative	Richard Blunt	600	55.5
Conservative	Julian Kirk	469	43.3
Independent	Roy Groom	439	40.6
Labour	Eden Kruh-Atar	207	19.1
Majority			
Turnout			
Conservative win (new seat)			
Conservative win (new seat)			

=== Watlington ===
Watlington
Party	Candidate	Votes	%	±%
Independent	Jim Bhondi	570	75.4	
Conservative	Peter Hodson	122	16.1	
UKIP	Guy Jarvis	64	8.5	
Majority				
Turnout				
Independent gain from Conservative		Swing		

=== West Winch ===
West Winch
Party	Candidate	Votes	%	±%
Independent	Simon Nash	542	48.4	
Conservative	Peter Gidney	500	44.7	
Conservative	Marcus Hopkins	448	40.0	
Green	Daphne Sampson	342	30.6	
Majority				
Turnout				
Independent gain from Conservative		Swing		
Conservative hold		Swing		

=== Wissey ===
Wissey
Party	Candidate	Votes	%	±%
Conservative	Colin Sampson	349	45.1	
Labour	Jim McNeill	157	20.3	
Independent	Judith Taylor	155	20.0	
UKIP	John Bankhead	113	14.6	
Majority				
Turnout				
Conservative hold		Swing		
