= 2021 Norfolk County Council election =

2021 UK local government election

- 6 May and 17 July 2021

All 84 seats to Norfolk County Council 43 seats needed for a majority
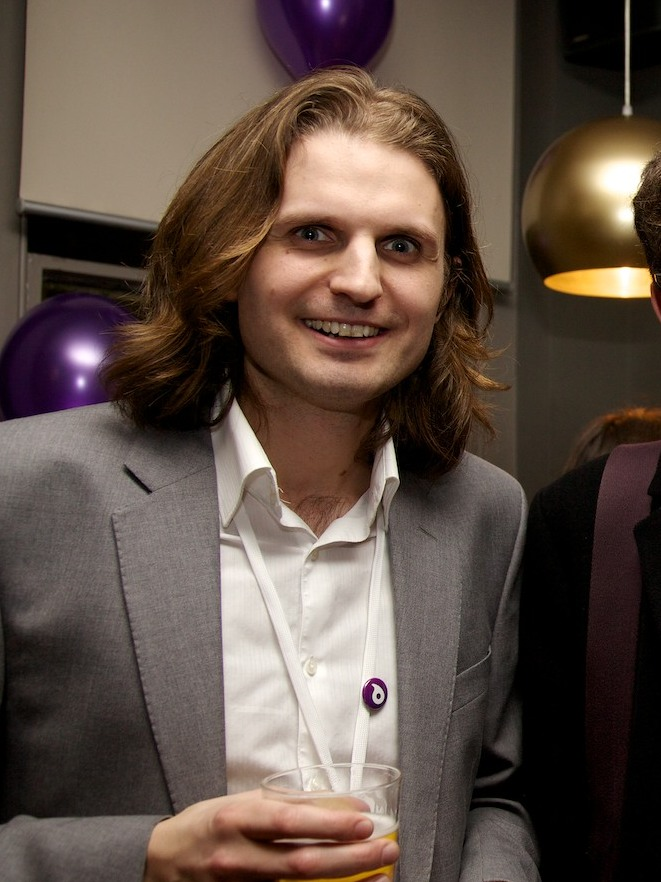

	First party	Second party	Third party
Leader	Andrew Proctor	Steve Morphew	Steffan Aquarone
Party	Conservative	Labour	Liberal Democrats
Leader since	1 June 2018	8 May 2017	20 April 2020
Leader's seat	Blofield & Brundall	Catton Grove	Melton Constable
Last election	55 seats, 48.8%	17 seats, 23.2%	11 seats, 17.4%
Seats before	52	16	9
Seats won	58	12	8
Seat change	▲3	▼5	▼3
Popular vote	114,940	52,413	35,292
Percentage	48.4%	22.1%	14.9%
Swing	▼0.4%	▼1.1%	▼2.5%
	Fourth party	Fifth party
Party	Green	Independent
Last election	0 seats, 4.0%	1 seats, 0.7%
Seats before	0	5
Seats won	3	3
Seat change	▲3	▲2
Popular vote	24,262	9,809
Percentage	10.2%	4.1%
Swing	▲6.2%	▲3.4%
- Results by division
Council control before election
Conservative Party
Council control after election
Conservative Party

The 2021 Norfolk County Council election took place alongside the other 2021 local elections. Eighty-three of the 84 seats on Norfolk County Council were elected on 6 May. The election in Sewell division was postponed following the death of Conservative candidate Evelyn Collishaw and was held on 17 July.

The Conservative Party retained control of the council and increased its majority, winning 58 seats with around the same vote share as in the 2017 election: the Liberal Democrats lost three seats in the north of the county, and Labour took losses to the Conservatives in the port towns of King's Lynn and Great Yarmouth as well as three losses to the Green Party who regained ground in southern and central Norwich.

== Summary ==
=== 2017 election ===
Party	Seats
Conservative	55
Labour	17
Liberal Democrats	11
Independent	1
Total	84

=== Composition of council seats before election ===
Party	Seats
Conservative	52
Labour	16
Liberal Democrats	9
Independent	5
Vacant	2
Total	84

=== Changes between elections ===
In between the 2017 election and the 2021 election, the following council seats changed hands:

Division	Date	Previous Party	New Party	Cause	Resulting Council Composition			
Division	Date	Previous Party	New Party	Cause	Con	Lab	LDem	Ind
Yarmouth North and Central	17 November 2017	Labour	Independent	Councillor quit party to sit as an independent member.	55	16	11	2
Marshland North	27 November 2017	Conservative	Independent	Councillor quit party to sit as an independent member.	54	16	11	3
Freebridge Lynn	5 March 2020	Conservative	Vacant	Sitting councillor resigned.	53	16	11	3
Mundesley	9 September 2020	Liberal Democrats	Independent	Councillor quit party to sit as an independent member.	53	16	10	4
North Walsham West and Erpingham	20 November 2020	Liberal Democrats	Conservative	Sitting Liberal Democrats Councillor defected to Conservatives.	54	16	9	4
Thetford East	2 March 2021	Conservative	Vacant	Sitting councillor resigned.	53	16	9	4
West Depwade	15 March 2021	Conservative	Independent	Councillor quit party to sit as an independent member.	52	16	9	5

=== Election result ===
2021 Norfolk County Council election
Party	Candidates	Seats	Gains	Losses	Net gain/loss	Seats %	Votes %	Votes	+/−
Conservative	84	58	4	1	▲3	69.0	48.4	114,940	–0.4
Labour	84	12	0	5	▼5	14.3	22.1	52,413	–1.1
Liberal Democrats	69	8	0	3	▼3	9.5	14.9	35,292	–2.5
Green	63	3	3	0	▲3	3.6	10.2	24,262	+6.2
Independent	19	3	2	0	▲2	3.6	4.1	9,809	+3.4
UKIP	4	0	0	0	Steady	0.0	0.2	386	–5.8
Reform	3	0	0	0	Steady	0.0	0.1	194	N/A
Monster Raving Loony	1	0	0	0	Steady	0.0	<0.1	45	N/A

== Results by division ==
=== Breckland ===
Breckland District Summary
Party	Seats	+/-	Votes	%	+/-
Conservative	11	Steady	19,315	61.6	–1.6
Labour	1	Steady	7,207	23.0	+0.4
Liberal Democrat	0	Steady	2,573	8.2	+0.6
Green	0	Steady	2,076	6.6	+4.5
UKIP	0	Steady	105	0.3	–4.3
Independent	0	Steady	91	0.3	N/A
Total	12	Steady	31,563	29.2	
Registered electors			108,021	–	

Division results

Attleborough
Party	Candidate	Votes	%	±%
Conservative	Rhodri Oliver *	1,597	61.0	–2.5
Labour	James Bremner	559	21.4	–2.4
Liberal Democrats	Ian Speller	462	17.6	+4.9
Majority		1,038	39.6	–0.0
Turnout		2,641	26.4	–2.0
Registered electors		10,013		+631
Conservative hold		Swing	–0.0	

Dereham North
Party	Candidate	Votes	%	±%
Conservative	William Richmond *	1,409	63.3	–2.0
Labour	Georgina Bunting	618	27.8	+7.1
Liberal Democrats	Brendan Bernard	199	8.9	+3.8
Majority		791	35.5	–9.1
Turnout		2,242	27.3	–2.1
Registered electors		8,212		+301
Conservative hold		Swing	–4.6	

Dereham South
Party	Candidate	Votes	%	±%
Conservative	Phillip Duigan *	1,152	51.0	+4.2
Labour	Harry Clarke	957	42.4	+8.5
Liberal Democrats	Jenny Pitchford	148	6.6	–1.7
Majority		195	8.6	–4.3
Turnout		2,314	25.8	–3.0
Registered electors		8,954		+210
Conservative hold		Swing	–2.2	

Elmham and Mattishall
Party	Candidate	Votes	%	±%
Conservative	Bill Borrett *	2,037	64.2	–6.8
Green	Philip Morton	410	12.9	N/A
Labour	Tara Harris	395	12.4	–6.2
Liberal Democrats	Mark Foley	332	10.5	+0.1
Majority		1,627	51.3	–1.1
Turnout		3,202	33.9	–0.8
Registered electors		9,453		+465
Conservative hold		Swing	–9.9	

Guiltcross
Party	Candidate	Votes	%	±%
Conservative	Stephen Askew *	1,987	66.5	–2.5
Labour	Michael Brindle	601	20.1	+4.8
Liberal Democrats	Beverley Bulmer	401	13.4	–2.3
Majority		1,386	46.4	–6.8
Turnout		3,002	33.7	+2.2
Registered electors		8,906		+496
Conservative hold		Swing	–3.6	

Necton and Launditch
Party	Candidate	Votes	%	±%
Conservative	Mark Kiddle-Morris *	2,099	63.3	–11.4
Labour	Joseph Sisto	569	17.2	–8.1
Green	Jane Keidan-Cooper	452	13.6	N/A
Liberal Democrats	Matthew Weatherill	195	5.9	N/A
Majority		1,530	46.2	–3.3
Turnout		3,344	37.3	–0.9
Registered electors		8,958		+223
Conservative hold		Swing	–1.6	

Swaffham
Party	Candidate	Votes	%	±%
Conservative	Ed Colman *	1,766	68.6	+9.2
Labour	John Zielinski	428	16.6	+1.8
Green	Peter Bate	233	9.1	N/A
Liberal Democrats	Paul Auber	147	5.7	–2.4
Majority		1,338	52.0	+10.4
Turnout		1,338	52.0	+7.3
Registered electors		8,740		+706
Conservative hold		Swing	+3.7	

The Brecks
Party	Candidate	Votes	%	±%
Conservative	Fabian Eagle *	2,172	69.4	–2.5
Labour	Stuart Terry	495	15.8	+3.8
Green	Anne Rix	291	9.3	+0.9
Liberal Democrats	Evie-May Ellis	170	5.4	–2.2
Majority		1,677	53.6	–2.6
Turnout		3,073	32.8	–0.6
Registered electors		9,359		+455
Conservative hold		Swing	–3.2	

Thetford East
Party	Candidate	Votes	%	±%
Conservative	Jane James	967	51.7	+3.6
Labour	Susan Dowling	684	36.6	+1.1
Liberal Democrats	Jamie Cash	114	6.1	N/A
UKIP	Denis Crawford	105	5.6	–10.8
Majority		283	15.1	+2.5
Turnout		1,889	24.2	–3.0
Registered electors		7,805		+278
Conservative hold		Swing	+1.3	

Thetford West
Party	Candidate	Votes	%	±%
Labour	Terry Jermy *	1,204	56.9	+5.4
Conservative	Barbara Tullett	720	34.0	+0.8
Liberal Democrats	Martin Callam	101	4.8	N/A
Independent	Philip Wagstaff	91	4.3	N/A
Majority		484	22.9	+4.6
Turnout		2,137	22.2	–4.7
Registered electors		9,634		+36
Labour hold		Swing	+2.3	

Watton
Party	Candidate	Votes	%	±%
Conservative	Claire Bowes*	1,685	66.2	–5.2
Green	Timothy Birt	380	14.9	+6.3
Labour	Keith Prince	327	12.8	–1.4
Liberal Democrats	James Minto	154	6.0	+0.3
Majority		1,305	51.3	–5.9
Turnout		2,566	26.0	–2.5
Registered electors		9,864		+1,070
Conservative hold		Swing	–5.7	

Yare and All Saints
Party	Candidate	Votes	%	±%
Conservative	Edward Connolly *	1,724	67.5	–5.2
Labour	Paul Siegert	370	14.5	+2.2
Green	Ann Bowyer	310	12.1	N/A
Liberal Democrats	Ulrike Behrendt	150	5.9	–9.1
Majority		1,354	53.0	–4.8
Turnout		2,579	31.7	–4.1
Registered electors		8,123		+447
Conservative hold		Swing	–3.7	

=== Broadland ===
Broadland District Summary
Party	Seats	+/-	Votes	%	+/-
Conservative	11	Steady	19,600	52.6	–2.8
Liberal Democrat	2	Steady	7,347	19.7	+0.2
Labour	0	Steady	6,721	18.1	–1.7
Green	0	Steady	3,486	9.4	+8.5
Independent	0	Steady	78	0.2	N/A
Total	13	Steady	37,232	100.0	

Division results

Acle
Party	Candidate	Votes	%	±%
Conservative	Lana Hempsall	1,321	54.7	+2.4
Labour	Cathy Cordiner-Achenbach	506	21.0	–8.5
Green	Caroline Fernandez	295	12.2	N/A
Liberal Democrats	Emelye Harvey	293	12.1	+2.4
Majority		815	33.7	+10.9
Turnout		2,432	35.0	–2.8
Registered electors		6,945		+150
Conservative hold		Swing	+5.4	

Aylsham
Party	Candidate	Votes	%	±%
Liberal Democrats	Steve Riley	1,442	42.7	–1.0
Conservative	Hal Turkmen	1,421	42.1	+2.8
Green	Andrew Boswell	234	6.9	N/A
Labour	Stephen Maseko	202	6.0	–6.5
Independent	Jonathan Rackham	78	2.3	N/A
Majority		21	0.6	–3.8
Liberal Democrats hold		Swing		

Blofield and Brundall
Party	Candidate	Votes	%	±%
Conservative	Andrew Proctor*	1,770	58.8	–3.9
Labour	Glenn Springett	553	18.4	+1.9
Green	Jan Davis	475	15.8	+10.0
Liberal Democrats	Ian Wilson	212	7.0	–2.8
Majority				
Conservative hold		Swing		

Drayton and Horsford
Party	Candidate	Votes	%	±%
Conservative	Tony Adams*	1,311	48.3	–15.1
Liberal Democrats	Dave Thomas	1,100	40.5	+19.3
Labour	Trevor Turk	306	11.3	–4.1
Majority		211	7.3	–34.9
Conservative hold		Swing		

Hellesdon
Party	Candidate	Votes	%	±%
Conservative	Shelagh Gurney*	1,734	59.3	–2.2
Labour	Bibin Baby	635	21.7	–3.2
Liberal Democrats	David Britcher	396	13.6	–0.1
Green	Ken Parsons	157	5.4	N/A
Majority				
Conservative hold		Swing		

Hevingham and Spixworth
Party	Candidate	Votes	%	±%
Liberal Democrats	Dan Roper*	1,545	59.1	+11.9
Conservative	Chris Corson	872	33.3	–5.5
Labour	Tony Hemmingway	199	7.6	–0.4
Majority		773	25.8	+17.5
Liberal Democrats hold		Swing		

Old Catton
Party	Candidate	Votes	%	±%
Conservative	Karen Vincent*	1,420	59.7	–5.4
Labour	Jack Manzi	580	24.4	+4.3
Green	Ian Chapman	227	9.5	N/A
Liberal Democrats	Alan Whiteside	153	6.4	–8.5
Majority				
Conservative hold		Swing		

Reepham
Party	Candidate	Votes	%	±%
Conservative	Greg Peck*	1,388	49.3	+5.1
Liberal Democrats	Sue Catchpole	893	31.7	+3.6
Green	Sarah Morgan	310	11.0	N/A
Labour	Tom Rednall	222	7.9	–14.1
Majority				
Conservative hold		Swing		

Sprowston
Party	Candidate	Votes	%	±%
Conservative	John Ward*	1,754	53.9	–0.1
Labour	Natasha Harpley	1,148	35.3	+5.3
Green	Kahn Johnson	212	6.5	N/A
Liberal Democrats	Simon Lockett	139	4.3	–4.1
Majority				
Conservative hold		Swing		

Taverham
Party	Candidate	Votes	%	±%
Conservative	Stuart Clancy*	1,571	59.1	–7.7
Liberal Democrats	Caroline Karimi-Ghovanlou	573	21.5	+10.6
Labour	Daryl Wickham	352	13.2	–3.1
Green	Claire Marcham	163	6.1	N/A
Majority				
Conservative hold		Swing		

Thorpe St Andrew
Party	Candidate	Votes	%	±%
Conservative	Ian Mackie*	1,721	53.7	–9.4
Green	Eleanor Laming	705	22.0	N/A
Labour	Gurpreet Padda	579	18.1	–4.7
Liberal Democrats	Phyllida Scrivens	197	6.1	–8.1
Majority				
Conservative hold		Swing		

Woodside
Party	Candidate	Votes	%	±%
Conservative	John Fisher*	1,515	50.6	–4.7
Labour	Martin Booth	1,000	33.4	+3.7
Green	Jim Green	363	12.1	N/A
Liberal Democrats	Victor Morgan	116	3.9	–4.7
Majority		515	17.2	−8.4
Conservative hold		Swing		

Wroxham
Party	Candidate	Votes	%	±%
Conservative	Fran Whymark	1,802	62.7	+3.7
Labour	Julia Wheeler	439	15.3	+4.6
Green	Nicholas Ball	345	12.0	+6.5
Liberal Democrats	Richard Moore	288	10.0	–9.9
Majority				
Conservative hold		Swing		

=== Great Yarmouth ===
Great Yarmouth Borough Summary
Party	Seats	+/-	Votes	%	+/-
Conservative	7	▲1	12,428	58.8	+13.9
Labour	2	▼1	5,821	27.5	–1.2
Green	0	Steady	1,627	7.7	+5.7
Independent	0	Steady	566	2.7	N/A
Liberal Democrat	0	Steady	500	2.4	+0.7
UKIP	0	Steady	121	0.6	–22.1
Reform UK	0	Steady	74	0.4	N/A
Total	9	Steady	21,137	100.0	

Division results

Breydon
Party	Candidate	Votes	%	±%
Conservative	Carl Smith*	1,615	63.5	+15.8
Labour	Trevor Wainwright	676	26.6	–2.8
Green	Hannah Morris	171	6.7	N/A
Liberal Democrats	Gareth Howe	83	3.3	N/A
Majority				
Conservative hold		Swing		

Caister on Sea
Party	Candidate	Votes	%	±%
Conservative	Penny Carpenter*	1,642	66.9	+17.1
Labour	Stuart Hellingsworth	685	27.9	+8.1
Green	Kenneth Petersen	126	5.1	–2.0
Majority				
Conservative hold		Swing		

East Flegg
Party	Candidate	Votes	%	±%
Conservative	James Bensly	1,975	72.3	+17.9
Labour	Edd Bush	384	14.1	–0.6
Green	Hannah Gray	328	12.0	+6.4
Liberal Democrats	Nicholas Read	43	1.6	N/A
Majority				
Conservative hold		Swing		

Gorleston St Andrews
Party	Candidate	Votes	%	±%
Conservative	Graham Plant*	1,369	56.9	+10.8
Labour	Jo Thurtle	734	30.5	–3.1
Green	Tracey Darnell	181	7.5	+3.3
Liberal Democrats	Gordon Smith	124	5.1	N/A
Majority				
Conservative hold		Swing		

Lothingland
Party	Candidate	Votes	%	±%
Conservative	Carl Annison	1,687	62.6	+15.1
Labour	Tony Wright	514	19.1	–4.9
Independent	Adrian Myers	353	13.1	N/A
Green	Trevor Rawson	139	5.2	N/A
Majority				
Conservative hold		Swing		

Magdalen
Party	Candidate	Votes	%	±%
Labour	Colleen Walker*	1,082	48.2	+0.2
Conservative	Ivan Murray-Smith	978	43.6	+10.2
Green	Georgie Oatley	183	8.2	N/A
Majority				
Labour hold		Swing		

West Flegg
Party	Candidate	Votes	%	±%
Conservative	Andy Grant	1,432	68.2	+5.5
Green	Emma Punchard	299	14.2	N/A
Labour	Claire Wardley	287	13.7	–3.7
Liberal Democrats	Rebecca Woods	82	3.9	–4.2
Majority				
Conservative hold		Swing		

Yarmouth Nelson and Southtown
Party	Candidate	Votes	%	±%
Labour	Mike Smith-Clare*	760	44.6	+1.9
Conservative	Daniel Candon	681	40.0	+15.1
Green	Rebecca Durant	109	6.4	N/A
Liberal Democrats	Mark Godfrey	79	4.6	+0.7
Reform	Mick Riley	74	4.3	N/A
Majority				
Labour hold		Swing		

Yarmouth North and Central
Party	Candidate	Votes	%	±%
Conservative	Graham Carpenter	1,049	46.4	+13.4
Labour	Sandy Lysaght	699	30.9	–3.5
Independent	Ron Ellis	213	9.4	N/A
UKIP	Carrie Talbot	121	5.3	–22.3
Green	Anne Killett	91	4.0	N/A
Liberal Democrats	Tony Harris	89	3.9	–1.2
Majority				
Conservative gain from Labour		Swing		

=== King's Lynn and West Norfolk ===
King's Lynn and West Norfolk Borough Summary
Party	Seats	+/-	Votes	%	+/-
Conservative	12	Steady	19,527	56.5	–1.9
Independent	2	▲1	6,026	17.4	+13.8
Labour	0	▼1	5,390	15.6	–4.1
Liberal Democrat	0	Steady	1,997	5.8	–3.9
Green	0	Steady	1,418	4.1	+2.7
UKIP	0	Steady	160	0.5	–6.9
Reform UK	0	Steady	56	0.2	N/A
Total	14	Steady	34,574	100.0	

Division results

Clenchwarton & King's Lynn South
Party	Candidate	Votes	%	±%
Independent	Alexandra Kemp*	1,280	57.9	+5.3
Conservative	Liam Hind	743	33.6	+6.2
Labour	Adam Giles	187	8.5	–5.6
Majority				
Independent hold		Swing		

Dersingham
Party	Candidate	Votes	%	±%
Conservative	Stuart Dark*	2,290	73.1	–0.4
Green	Jordan Stokes	456	14.6	N/A
Labour	George Lankester	238	7.6	–8.3
Liberal Democrats	Erika Coward	149	4.8	–5.8
Majority				
Conservative hold		Swing		

Docking
Party	Candidate	Votes	%	±%
Conservative	Michael Chenery of Horsbrugh*	1,499	56.5	–12.1
Independent	Chris Morley	706	26.6	N/A
Labour	Michelle Carter	448	16.9	–1.5
Majority				
Conservative hold		Swing		

Downham Market
Party	Candidate	Votes	%	±%
Conservative	Tony White*	1,395	51.9	–8.9
Liberal Democrats	Josie Ratcliffe	641	23.8	+10.5
Labour	Eamonn McCusker	372	13.8	–0.9
Independent	Jackie Westrop	280	10.4	N/A
Majority				
Conservative hold		Swing		

Feltwell
Party	Candidate	Votes	%	±%
Conservative	Martin Storey*	1,983	65.2	–3.1
Independent	Tom Ryves	456	15.0	N/A
Labour	Christopher Harvey	416	13.7	–8.7
Independent	Neil Aldridge	185	6.1	N/A
Majority				
Conservative hold		Swing		

Fincham
Party	Candidate	Votes	%	±%
Conservative	Brian Long*	1,510	59.6	+0.3
Independent	Alan Holmes	629	24.8	N/A
Labour	Jo Smith	396	15.6	–1.4
Majority				
Conservative hold		Swing		

Freebridge Lynn
Party	Candidate	Votes	%	±%
Conservative	Nick Daubney	1,670	64.7	+7.5
Green	Andrew de Whalley	510	19.7	+1.7
Labour	Francis Bone	403	15.6	+2.4
Majority				
Conservative hold		Swing		

Gayton and Nar Valley
Party	Candidate	Votes	%	±%
Independent	Jim Moriarty	1,370	48.5	N/A
Conservative	Olivia Morris	1,156	40.9	–20.9
Labour	David Collis	298	10.6	–7.4
Majority				
Independent gain from Conservative		Swing		

Gaywood North and Central
Party	Candidate	Votes	%	±%
Conservative	Graham Middleton	1,031	56.1	+10.5
Labour	Helen Dalgliesh	616	33.5	+1.0
Liberal Democrats	David Mills	131	7.1	+0.8
UKIP	Jim Perkins	61	3.3	–8.5
Majority				
Conservative hold		Swing		

Gaywood South
Party	Candidate	Votes	%	±%
Conservative	Thomas Smith*	980	48.3	+9.6
Labour	Micaela Bartrum	724	35.6	+1.4
Liberal Democrats	Rob Colwell	228	11.2	–5.5
UKIP	Michael Stone	99	4.9	–5.5
Majority				
Conservative hold		Swing		

King`s Lynn North and Central
Party	Candidate	Votes	%	±%
Conservative	Lesley Bambridge	520	37.7	+7.1
Labour	Wilfred Lambert	482	34.9	–11.7
Green	Rob Archer	256	18.6	N/A
Liberal Democrats	Richard Coward	66	4.8	–5.2
Reform	Gary Bramham	56	4.1	N/A
Majority				
Conservative gain from Labour		Swing		

Marshland North
Party	Candidate	Votes	%	±%
Conservative	Julian Kirk	1,224	58.2	–13.1
Independent	Sandra Squire*	574	27.3	−44.0
Labour	Matthew Hannay	305	14.5	–3.1
Majority				
Conservative hold		Swing		

Marshland South
Party	Candidate	Votes	%	±%
Conservative	Chris Dawson	1,679	62.8	+2.8
Independent	Colin Rose	546	20.4	–0.3
Labour	David Hodgkinson	253	9.5	–3.7
Green	Alastair Kent	196	7.3	N/A
Majority				
Conservative hold		Swing		

North Coast
Party	Candidate	Votes	%	±%
Conservative	Andrew Jamieson*	1,847	64.1	–4.6
Liberal Democrats	John Crofts	782	27.1	+17.8
Labour	John Simmons	252	8.7	–5.7
Majority				
Conservative hold		Swing		

=== North Norfolk ===
North Norfolk District Summary
Party	Seats	+/-	Votes	%	+/-
Conservative	6	▲2	14,637	44.4	+5.1
Liberal Democrat	4	▼3	11,751	35.7	–6.0
Independent	1	▲1	1,868	5.7	+5.4
Labour	0	Steady	2,374	7.2	–2.7
Green	0	Steady	2,275	6.9	+3.8
MRLP	0	Steady	45	0.1	N/A
Total	11	Steady	32,950	100.0	

Cromer
Party	Candidate	Votes	%	±%
Liberal Democrats	Tim Adams*	1,745	54.4	+9.8
Conservative	Richard Parker	1,071	33.4	–6.0
Labour	David Russell	207	6.5	–1.2
Green	Mike Bossingham	186	5.8	+2.1
Majority				
Liberal Democrats hold		Swing		

Fakenham
Party	Candidate	Votes	%	±%
Conservative	Tom Fitzpatrick*	1,376	53.5	+0.9
Independent	John Rest	569	22.1	N/A
Labour	Ruth Goodall	371	14.4	+0.4
Green	Kris Marshall-Smith	256	10.0	+6.8
Majority				
Conservative hold		Swing		

Holt
Party	Candidate	Votes	%	±%
Conservative	Eric Vardy	1,650	47.6	+7.8
Liberal Democrats	Sarah Butikofer*	1,311	37.8	–7.8
Green	Simon Russell	297	8.6	+5.2
Labour	Kay Montandon	212	6.1	+0.4
Majority				
Conservative gain from Liberal Democrats		Swing		

Hoveton and Stalham
Party	Candidate	Votes	%	±%
Conservative	Nigel Dixon*	1,613	65.0	+5.2
Liberal Democrats	Pierre Butikofer	353	14.2	–9.7
Labour	Richard Stowe	274	11.0	–0.7
Green	Michael Filgate	157	6.3	+1.7
Independent	Paul Rice	85	3.4	N/A
Majority				
Conservative hold		Swing		

Melton Constable
Party	Candidate	Votes	%	±%
Liberal Democrats	Steffan Aquarone*	1,490	46.6	+1.7
Conservative	Jonathan Wilton	1,291	40.4	+7.7
Green	Rosie Woolgar	212	6.6	+4.3
Labour	Rebecca Shaw	202	6.3	–1.9
Majority				
Liberal Democrats hold		Swing		

Mundesley
Party	Candidate	Votes	%	±%
Independent	Edward Maxfield*	1,128	34.0	–8.5
Liberal Democrats	Wendy Fredericks	1,052	31.7	–10.8
Conservative	Crispian Riley-Smith	891	26.8	–13.6
Labour	Jasper Haywood	140	4.2	–3.6
Green	Mark Taylor	109	3.3	N/A
Majority				
Independent gain from Liberal Democrats		Swing		

North Walsham East
Party	Candidate	Votes	%	±%
Liberal Democrats	Lucy Shires	1,303	43.9	–10.6
Conservative	Pauline Porter	1,256	42.3	+14.8
Labour	Graham Jones	218	7.3	–1.3
Green	Elizabeth Dixon	191	6.4	+2.9
Majority				
Liberal Democrats hold		Swing		

North Walsham West and Erpingham
Party	Candidate	Votes	%	±%
Liberal Democrats	Saul Penfold	1,259	41.7	+7.2
Conservative	Jon Payne	1,206	39.9	+9.1
Green	Chris Melhuish	315	10.4	+6.6
Labour	Claudia Owen	241	8.0	–18.3
Majority				
Liberal Democrats hold		Swing		

Sheringham
Party	Candidate	Votes	%	±%
Conservative	Judy Oliver*	1,590	51.1	+5.1
Liberal Democrats	Liz Withington	1,157	37.2	–1.3
Labour	Ruth Bartlett	171	5.5	–3.5
Green	Simon Grewcock	150	4.8	+2.9
Monster Raving Loony	Tony Shannocks Poet Bolster	45	1.4	N/A
Majority				
Conservative hold		Swing		

South Smallburgh
Party	Candidate	Votes	%	±%
Conservative	Richard Price*	1,381	46.6	+4.4
Liberal Democrats	Adam Varley	1,165	39.3	–1.0
Green	Anne Filgate	198	6.7	+1.6
Labour	Finola Gaynor-Powell	133	4.5	–1.1
Independent	Nick Coppack	86	2.9	N/A
Majority				
Conservative hold		Swing		

Wells
Party	Candidate	Votes	%	±%
Conservative	Michael Dalby	1,312	49.8	+23.0
Liberal Democrats	Andrew Brown	916	34.7	–26.2
Labour	Xenia Horne	205	7.8	+1.6
Green	Stephen Green	204	7.7	+5.2
Majority				
Conservative gain from Liberal Democrats		Swing		

=== Norwich ===
Norwich City Summary
Party	Seats	+/-	Votes	%	+/-
Labour	9	▼3	17,576	44.9	–0.8
Green	3	▲3	9,432	24.1	+7.6
Liberal Democrat	1	Steady	2,956	7.6	–3.4
Conservative	0	Steady	8,882	22.7	+0.6
Independent	0	Steady	292	0.7	+0.2
Total	13	Steady	39,138	100.0	

Division results

Bowthorpe
Party	Candidate	Votes	%	±%
Labour	Mike Sands*	1,419	54.3	+4.3
Conservative	Roy Ashman	756	29.0	–1.2
Independent	Jonathan Watson	292	11.2	N/A
Liberal Democrats	Sean Bennett	144	5.5	+0.2
Majority				
Labour hold		Swing		

Catton Grove
Party	Candidate	Votes	%	±%
Labour	Steve Morphew*	1,321	49.9	+2.2
Conservative	Richard Potter	922	34.8	–3.4
Green	Tony Park	300	11.3	+4.5
Liberal Democrats	Nigel Lubbock	105	4.0	–0.6
Majority				
Labour hold		Swing		

Crome
Party	Candidate	Votes	%	±%
Labour	Alison Birmingham	1,073	45.2	–4.7
Conservative	Jonathan Emsell	967	40.8	+8.6
Green	Judith Ford	242	10.2	+3.8
Liberal Democrats	Victor Scrivens	90	3.8	–0.2
Majority				
Labour hold		Swing		

Eaton
Party	Candidate	Votes	%	±%
Liberal Democrats	Brian Watkins*	1,640	39.3	–7.2
Labour	Peter Prinsley	1,172	28.1	+10.8
Conservative	John Ward	967	23.2	–4.9
Green	Jane Saunders	395	9.5	+3.3
Majority				
Liberal Democrats hold		Swing		

Lakenham
Party	Candidate	Votes	%	±%
Labour	Brenda Jones*	1,453	55.9	+5.6
Conservative	Helen Betts	818	31.5	+12.7
Liberal Democrats	Penelope Hubble	329	12.7	+1.5
Majority				
Labour hold		Swing		

Mancroft
Party	Candidate	Votes	%	±%
Green	Jamie Osborn	1,819	51.9	+27.7
Labour	Danny Douglas*	1,165	33.2	–13.3
Conservative	Craig Harvey	521	14.9	–3.0
Majority				
Green gain from Labour		Swing		

Mile Cross
Party	Candidate	Votes	%	±%
Labour	Chrissie Rumsby*	1,084	49.8	+1.0
Conservative	Stephen Bailey	611	28.1	+5.9
Green	Fiona Dowson	373	17.1	+7.0
Liberal Democrats	Susan Holland	107	4.9	–1.5
Majority				
Labour hold		Swing		

Nelson
Party	Candidate	Votes	%	±%
Green	Paul Neale	1,945	48.1	+10.7
Labour	Caroline Sykes	1,765	43.7	–3.6
Conservative	Iain Gwynn	332	8.2	+1.2
Majority				
Green gain from Labour		Swing		

Due to the death of Evelyn Collishaw, the Conservative candidate, after the close of nominations, the election for Sewell division was delayed until 17 July.

Sewell
Party	Candidate	Votes	%	±%
Labour	Julie Brociek-Coulton*	1,132	45.3	–14.2
Green	Adrian Holmes	1,005	40.2	+29.0
Conservative	Simon Jones	320	12.8	–4.6
Liberal Democrats	Helen Arundell	40	1.6	–5.8
Majority				
Labour hold		Swing		

Thorpe Hamlet
Party	Candidate	Votes	%	±%
Green	Ben Price	1,654	42.6	+9.8
Labour	Cavan Stewart	1,427	36.8	+1.8
Conservative	Jonathan Gillespie	801	20.6	–2.1
Majority				
Green gain from Labour		Swing		

Town Close
Party	Candidate	Votes	%	±%
Labour	Emma Corlett*	2,191	53.9	+2.0
Conservative	Mary Chacksfield	876	21.6	–1.7
Green	Willem Buttinger	721	17.7	+3.8
Liberal Democrats	Neil Hardman	276	6.8	–2.1
Majority				
Labour hold		Swing		

University
Party	Candidate	Votes	%	±%
Labour	Matthew Reilly	980	51.7	–7.1
Green	John Greenaway	419	22.1	+9.2
Conservative	Henry Lynn	377	19.9	+3.4
Liberal Democrats	Huw Sayer	118	6.2	–0.1
Majority				
Labour hold		Swing		

Wensum
Party	Candidate	Votes	%	±%
Labour	Maxine Webb	1,394	52.1	+2.7
Conservative	David King	614	23.0	+6.0
Green	Teresa Belton	559	20.9	–1.9
Liberal Democrats	Gordon Dean	107	4.0	–0.3
Majority				
Labour hold		Swing		

=== South Norfolk ===
South Norfolk District Summary
Party	Seats	+/-	Votes	%	+/-
Conservative	11	Steady	20,551	50.2	–7.6
Liberal Democrat	1	Steady	8,168	19.9	–4.7
Labour	0	Steady	7,324	17.9	+1.0
Green	0	Steady	3,948	9.6	+8.8
Independent	0	Steady	888	2.2	N/A
Reform UK	0	Steady	64	0.2	N/A
Total	12	Steady	40,943	100.0	

Division results

Clavering
Party	Candidate	Votes	%	±%
Conservative	Barry Stone	1,742	49.2	–3.0
Liberal Democrats	Ian Stone	947	26.7	–6.9
Green	Eric Wareham	484	13.7	N/A
Labour	Alison Green	369	10.4	–3.7
Majority				
Conservative hold		Swing		

Costessey
Party	Candidate	Votes	%	±%
Liberal Democrats	Sharon Blundell	1,387	37.9	–7.0
Conservative	John Irving	1,261	34.4	+0.4
Labour	Jamal Sealey	730	19.9	+4.4
Green	Owen Watkins	283	7.7	+2.1
Majority				
Liberal Democrats hold		Swing		

Diss and Roydon
Party	Candidate	Votes	%	±%
Conservative	Keith Kiddie*	1,512	53.6	–0.3
Liberal Democrats	Trevor Wenman	594	21.1	–7.7
Labour	Pam Reekie	454	16.1	+2.5
Green	David Reynolds	259	9.2	+5.5
Majority				
Conservative hold		Swing		

East Depwade
Party	Candidate	Votes	%	±%
Conservative	Martin Wilby*	1,700	62.5	–4.6
Labour	James Eddy	463	17.0	+0.4
Green	Andrew Newby	330	12.1	N/A
Liberal Democrats	Bernard Chauly	227	8.3	–8.0
Majority				
Conservative hold		Swing		

Forehoe
Party	Candidate	Votes	%	±%
Conservative	Daniel Elmer	1,622	45.6	–12.6
Liberal Democrats	Vivienne Clifford-Jackson	979	27.5	+4.4
Labour	John Morland	531	14.9	–3.8
Green	Ian Boreham	363	10.2	N/A
Reform	Tom Matthews	64	1.8	N/A
Majority				
Conservative hold		Swing		

Henstead
Party	Candidate	Votes	%	±%
Conservative	Vic Thomson*	1,744	46.9	–10.2
Liberal Democrats	David Fairbairn	1,044	28.1	+4.7
Labour	Chris Smith	523	14.1	–5.4
Green	Julie Young	409	11.0	N/A
Majority				
Conservative hold		Swing		

Hingham
Party	Candidate	Votes	%	±%
Conservative	Margaret Dewsbury*	1,644	60.8	–6.6
Green	Victoria Walters	440	16.3	N/A
Labour	Kendra Cogman	357	13.2	–3.2
Liberal Democrats	Gary Blundell	263	9.7	–6.5
Majority				
Conservative hold		Swing		

Humbleyard
Party	Candidate	Votes	%	±%
Conservative	David Bills*	2,087	52.5	–7.2
Labour	Simon Chapman	971	24.4	+7.9
Green	Janet Bearman	494	12.4	N/A
Liberal Democrats	Julian Halls	426	10.7	–13.1
Majority				
Conservative hold		Swing		

Loddon
Party	Candidate	Votes	%	±%
Conservative	Kay Mason Billig	2,007	53.9	–9.3
Labour	Jeremy Rowe	1,372	36.9	+18.6
Liberal Democrats	Gill Stone	342	9.2	–9.3
Majority				
Conservative hold		Swing		

Long Stratton
Party	Candidate	Votes	%	±%
Conservative	Alison Thomas*	1,763	62.7	–1.7
Labour	David Vail	515	18.3	+2.3
Green	Shaun Button	275	9.8	N/A
Liberal Democrats	Jon Norton	260	9.2	–10.3
Majority				
Conservative hold		Swing		

West Depwade
Party	Candidate	Votes	%	±%
Conservative	Barry Duffin	1,632	43.6	–21.7
Independent	Beverley Spratt*	888	23.7	–41.6
Labour	Alyson Read	478	12.8	–2.8
Liberal Democrats	Bob McClenning	394	10.5	–8.6
Green	Carol Sharp	349	9.3	N/A
Majority				
Conservative hold		Swing		

Wymondham
Party	Candidate	Votes	%	±%
Conservative	Robert Savage	1,837	46.3	–9.6
Liberal Democrats	Suzanne Nuri-Nixon	1,305	32.9	+9.7
Labour	Christopher Bunting	561	14.1	–6.8
Green	Paul Sutcliff	262	6.6	N/A
Majority				
Conservative hold		Swing		

== Changes 2021–2025 ==
=== Affiliation changes ===
- In November 2023, two Labour councillors in Norwich wards, Emma Corlett and Maxine Webb, left the party to sit as independents.

=== By-elections ===
==== Gaywood South ====
The by-election was triggered by the resignation of Conservative councillor Thomas Smith, less than a month after he had been re-elected in May 2021.

Gaywood South by-election, 29 July 2021
Party	Candidate	Votes	%	±%
Liberal Democrats	Rob Colwell	648	39.3	+28.1
Labour	Micaela Bartrum	561	34.0	−1.6
Conservative	Phil Trask	378	22.9	−25.4
Independent	Robin Talbot	35	2.1	N/A
UKIP	Michael Stone	28	1.7	−3.2
Majority		87	5.3	N/A
Turnout		1,650	17.3	
Liberal Democrats gain from Conservative		Swing	▲14.9	

==== Gaywood North and Central ====
The by-election was triggered by the resignation of Conservative councillor Graham Middleton.

Gaywood North and Central by-election, 1 December 2022
Party	Candidate	Votes	%	±%
Liberal Democrats	David Sayers	364	35.6	+28.5
Labour	Richard Johnson	356	34.8	+1.3
Conservative	Sheila Young	256	25.0	−31.1
Green	Vicky Fairweather	46	4.5	N/A
Majority		8	0.8	N/A
Turnout		1,022	13.7	
Registered electors		7,508		
Liberal Democrats gain from Conservative		Swing	▲13.6	

==== Swaffham ====
The by-election followed the resignation of Conservative councillor Ed Colman, who stood down from both the county and district councils following a change in circumstances.

Swaffham by-election, 4 May 2023
Party	Candidate	Votes	%	±%
Conservative	William Nunn	1,288	50.8	−17.8
Labour	Terry Land	649	25.6	+9.0
Liberal Democrats	Josephine Ratcliffe	596	23.5	+17.8
Majority		639	25.2	−26.7
Turnout		2,533	28.7	
Registered electors		9,062		
Conservative hold		Swing	▼13.4	

==== West Depwade ====
The by-election was triggered by the death of Conservative councillor Barry Duffin.

West Depwade by-election, 13 July 2023
Party	Candidate	Votes	%	±%
Green	Catherine Rowett	663	29.0	+19.7
Conservative	Anthony Holden	582	25.4	−18.2
Liberal Democrats	Ian Spratt	409	17.9	+7.4
Independent	Beverley Spratt	405	17.7	−6.0
Labour	Pamela Reekie	228	10.0	−2.8
Majority		81	3.5	N/A
Turnout		2,287	24.8	
Registered electors		9,256		
Green gain from Conservative		Swing	▲19.0	

==== Freebridge Lynn (August 2023) ====
The by-election was triggered by the death of Conservative councillor Nick Daubney.

Freebridge Lynn by-election, 3 August 2023
Party	Candidate	Votes	%	±%
Liberal Democrats	John Crofts	669	38.4	N/A
Conservative	Olivia Morris	539	31.0	−33.7
Green	Michael De Whalley	418	24.0	+4.3
Labour	Lesley Marriage	115	6.6	−9.0
Majority		130	7.5	N/A
Turnout		1,741	23.8	
Registered electors		7,361		
Liberal Democrats gain from Conservative		Swing	N/A	

==== Freebridge Lynn (September 2024) ====
The by-election was triggered by the death of Liberal Democrat councillor John Crofts. Vote-share changes are relative to the 2021 election, rather than the August 2023 by-election.

Freebridge Lynn by-election, 12 September 2024
Party	Candidate	Votes	%	±%
Independent	Simon Ring	723	53.8	N/A
Conservative	Jason Law	454	33.8	−30.9
Labour	Wilf Lambert	167	12.4	−3.2
Majority		269	20.0	N/A
Turnout		1,344	18.1	
Registered electors		7,449		
Independent gain from Liberal Democrats				

==== Mancroft ====
The by-election followed the resignation of Green councillor Jamie Osborn from his city and county council seats.

Mancroft by-election, 1 May 2025
Party	Candidate	Votes	%	±%
Green	Serene Shibli	1,255	50.3	−1.6
Reform	Karl Catchpole	510	20.4	N/A
Labour	Josh Horsfall	432	17.3	–15.9
Conservative	Edith Jones	147	5.9	–9.0
Liberal Democrats	Gordon Richard Dean	124	5.0	N/A
Homeland	Lorna Garner	26	1.0	N/A
Majority		745	29.9	
Turnout		2,494	27.2	
Registered electors		9,217		
Green hold				

==== Marshland North ====
The by-election was caused by Conservative councillor Julian Kirk's resignation after he joined Reform UK; Kirk then regained the seat for his new party.

Marshland North by-election, 1 May 2025
Party	Candidate	Votes	%	±%
Reform	Julian Kirk	1,286	54.9	N/A
Liberal Democrats	Alan Holmes	404	17.3	N/A
Conservative	Richard Blunt	389	16.6	−41.6
Labour	Matt Hannay	120	5.1	−9.4
Green	Rob Archer	75	3.2	N/A
Independent	Michael Squire	67	2.9	N/A
Majority		882	37.7	N/A
Turnout		2,341	28.8	
Reform gain from Conservative				

==== Thetford West ====
The by-election followed the resignation of Labour councillor Terry Jermy after he was elected as the member of Parliament for South West Norfolk in July 2024.

Thetford West by-election, 1 May 2025
Party	Candidate	Votes	%	±%
Reform	David Bick	917	47.9	N/A
Labour	Terry Land	644	33.6	−23.3
Conservative	Peter Wilkinson	240	12.5	−21.5
Liberal Democrats	Ian Minto	115	6.0	+1.2
Majority		273	14.2	N/A
Turnout		1,916	19.6	
Registered electors		9,857		
Reform gain from Labour				
