= 2019 Breckland District Council election =

2019 UK local government election

- 2 May 2019

All 49 council seats 25 seats needed for a majority

	First party	Second party	Third party
Party	Conservative	Labour	Independent
Last election	42	2	1
Seats won	37	6	4
Seat change	-5	+4	+3
Popular vote	28,126	10,247	5,346
Percentage	58.3	21.2	11.1
	Fourth party	Fifth party
Party	Green	UKIP
Last election	0	4
Seats won	2	0
Seat change	+2	-4
Popular vote	3,410	630
Percentage	7.1	1.3
- Winner of each seat at the 2019 Breckland District Council election.
Party before election
Conservative
Elected Party
Conservative

The 2019 Breckland District Council election took place on 2 May 2019 to elect members of Breckland District Council in England. This was on the same day as other local elections. The boundaries for this election were the same as those used in 2015.

The Conservative Party held the council with a very large majority, losing one seat to the Green Party (who also won an independent seat and thereby gained their first ever seats in the district) and three to independent candidates, though they gained one seat from UKIP. UKIP lost all four of its seats, with the remaining three being taken by the Labour Party, which became the second largest party on the council with six seats.

== Summary ==
=== Election result ===
2019 Breckland District Council election
Party	Candidates	Seats	Gains	Losses	Net gain/loss	Seats %	Votes %	Votes	+/−
Conservative	47	37	1	6	▼5	75.5	58.3	28,126	+11.5
Labour	31	6	4	0	▲4	12.2	21.2	10,247	+2.3
Independent	8	4	3	0	▲3	8.2	11.1	5,346	+6.1
Green	7	2	2	0	▲2	4.1	7.1	3,410	+0.5
UKIP	2	0	0	4	▼4	0.0	1.3	630	–20.6
Liberal Democrats	1	0	0	0	Steady	0.0	1.1	521	+0.2

Total votes cast: 48,280.

In addition to the elections, a referendum was held on the Swaffham neighbourhood plan. This passed 1,572 votes in favour (81.5%) to 334 votes against (18.5%). 1,930 ballot papers were issued and the turnout was 30.5%.

== Breckland Politics 2015-2019 ==
After the 2015 election, 42 councillors were Conservatives, 4 were UKIP, 2 Labour, and 1 independent. This had changed by 2015 in the following ways:

Party	Seats (2015 election)	Seats (April 2019)
Conservative	42	38
UKIP	4	3
Labour	2	3
Independent	1	3
Ind. Unionist	0	1
Total	49	48

The Conservatives retained control of the council with a sizeable majority throughout this period, despite losing four councillors. The changes were caused by three defections or resignations from the Conservative group, one seat change in a by-election, and one death shortly before the 2019 election. Two Conservative councillors left to sit as independents. One was Pablo Dimoglou of Mattishall, who resigned after accusing Council leader William Nunn of an undisclosed connection to the ownership of a local golf club in which the council had invested, before apologising for the allegation and resigning from the group; the other was Thomas Monument of Dereham Withburga, who was found guilty of assault after head-butting and punching an ex girlfriend. One Conservative (John Rogers of Saham Toney) left to sit as a Unionist. There was also a Labour gain from the Conservatives in a by-election in the Thetford Priory ward in September 2017. A UKIP councillor, John Newton of Castle Ward in, died in January 2019; his seat was not filled by a by-election due to the close proximity of this election.

There were also a number of Conservative holds in by-elections: Attleborough Queens & Besthorpe in 2016, and Harling & Heathlands and Saham Toney in 2017.

In the run-up to the 2019 election, the parties nominated a variable number of candidates. The Conservatives again by a wide margin nominated the most candidates, this time nominating one fewer than in 2015 and thus failing to contest just two of the 49 council seats. The Labour Party nominated 31 candidates, up from a previous 25, being the only party to significantly increase their candidate total. This was a major factor in far fewer wards being uncontested than in 2015. There were also more independent candidates, a total of eight, up from a previous total of three. The Green Party meanwhile nominated two fewer candidates; the largest drop in candidate numbers was seen by UKIP, who having stood eighteen candidates previously now only stood two. The Liberal Democrats further decreased their number of candidates from two to one.

Unlike in 2015, none of the council's 27 wards were uncontested.

== Full results by ward ==
All Saints & Wayland
Party	Candidate	Votes	%	±%
Conservative	Sarah Elizabeth Suggitt	983	64.3	
Conservative	Phil Cowen	971	63.5	
Labour	Irene Macdonald	384	25.1	
Labour	Joseph Dickerson	383	25.0	
Majority		587	38.4	
Registered electors		4,984		
Turnout		1614	32.38	
Rejected ballots		85	5.3	
Conservative hold		Swing		
Conservative hold		Swing		

Ashill
Party	Candidate	Votes	%	±%
Conservative	Fabian Royston Eagle	513	64.8	+14.0
Green	Anne Patricia Melba Rix	179	22.6	+6.7
Labour	James Gornall	100	12.6	+12.6
Majority		334	42.2	
Registered electors		2,177		
Turnout		814	37.39	
Rejected ballots		22	2.7	
Conservative hold		Swing		

Attleborough Burgh & Havercroft (2 seats)
Party	Candidate	Votes	%	±%
Conservative	Keith Martin	563	51.0	
Independent	Taila Taylor	462	41.8	
Conservative	Adrian Charles Stasiak	428	38.7	
Labour	Timothy Clarke	247	22.4	
Labour	Peter Panayi	167	15.1	
Majority		34	3.1	
Registered electors		3,989		
Turnout		1151	28.85	
Rejected ballots		46	4.0	
Conservative hold		Swing		
Independent gain from Conservative		Swing		

Attleborough Queens & Besthorpe (3 seats)
Party	Candidate	Votes	%	±%
Conservative	Vera Julia Dale	712	54.1	
Conservative	Tristan John Ashby	593	45.1	
Conservative	Oliver Rhodri	578	44.0	
Independent	Anthony Crouch	526	40.0	
Labour	Phil Spiby	393	29.9	
Majority		52	4.0	
Registered electors		5,439		
Turnout		1333	24.51	
Rejected ballots		18	1.4	
Conservative hold		Swing		
Conservative hold		Swing		
Conservative hold		Swing		

Note: Anthony Crouch also contested this seat for UKIP in 2015, getting 23.1% on that occasion.

Bedingfield
Party	Candidate	Votes	%	±%
Conservative	Mike Nairn	483	74.3	
Labour	Natasha Morgan	167	25.7	
Majority		316	48.6	
Registered electors		2,396		
Turnout		709	29.59	
Rejected ballots		59	8.3	
Conservative hold		Swing		

The Buckenhams and Banham
Party	Candidate	Votes	%	±%
Conservative	Stephen Askew	458	54.7	
Green	Jan Prior	270	32.3	
Labour	Chrissie Nebbett	106	12.7	
Majority		188	22.5	
Registered electors		2,547		
Turnout		843	33.10	
Rejected ballots		6	0.7	
Conservative hold		Swing		

Dereham Neatherd (3 seats)
Party	Candidate	Votes	%	±%
Green	Philip Neil Morton	837	52.9	
Conservative	Alison Mary Webb	834	52.7	
Conservative	Linda Helen Monument	821	51.9	
Conservative	William Robert James Richmond	750	47.4	
Majority		71	4.5	
Registered electors		5,682		
Turnout		1,629	28.67	
Rejected ballots		46	2.8	
Green gain from Conservative		Swing		
Conservative hold		Swing		
Conservative hold		Swing		

Dereham Toftwood (2 seats)
Party	Candidate	Votes	%	±%
Conservative	Philip James Duigan	556	51.8	
Conservative	Hilary Bushell	541	50.4	
Labour	Chris Bunting	470	43.8	
Labour	Kendra Cogman	397	37.0	
Majority		71	6.6	
Registered electors		4,357		
Turnout		1129	25.91	
Rejected ballots		55	4.9	
Conservative hold		Swing		
Conservative hold		Swing		

Dereham Withburga (2 seats)
Party	Candidate	Votes	%	±%
Labour	Harry Clarke	455	44.9	
Conservative	Kay Elizabeth Grey	401	39.5	
Labour	Amy-Jane Brooks	383	37.8	
Independent	Thomas Monument	376	37.1	
Majority		18	1.8	
Registered electors		4,413		
Turnout		1035	23.45	
Rejected ballots		21	2.0	
Labour hold		Swing		
Conservative hold		Swing		

Forest (2 seats)
Party	Candidate	Votes	%	±%
Conservative	Samuel Hayden Chapman-Allen	459	70.7	
Conservative	Robert George Kybird	394	60.7	
Labour	David Hodgkinson	168	25.9	
Majority		226	34.8	
Registered electors		2,227		
Turnout		692	31.07	
Rejected ballots		43	6.2	
Conservative hold		Swing		
Conservative hold		Swing		

Guiltcross
Party	Candidate	Votes	%	±%
Conservative	Marion Penelope Chapman-Allen	584	67.6	
Labour	James Waters	279	32.3	
Majority		305	35.3	
Registered electors		2,466		
Turnout		907	36.78	
Rejected ballots		43	4.7	
Conservative hold		Swing		

Harling and Heathlands
Party	Candidate	Votes	%	±%
Conservative	William Nunn	535	71.4	
Labour	Liz Bernard	213	28.4	
Majority		322	43.0	
Registered electors		2,552		
Turnout		785	30.76	
Rejected ballots		36	4.6	
Conservative hold		Swing		

Hermitage
Party	Candidate	Votes	%	±%
Conservative	Trevor Richard Carter	561	71.2	
Labour	Dawn Karen Fairbrother	226	28.7	
Majority		335	42.5	
Registered electors		2,230		
Turnout		828	37.13	
Rejected ballots		40	4.8	
Conservative hold		Swing		

Launditch
Party	Candidate	Votes	%	±%
Conservative	Mark Kiddle-Morris	472	73.5	
Labour	Mike Hirst	170	26.5	
Majority		302	47.0	
Registered electors		2,041		
Turnout		690	33.81	
Rejected ballots		48	7.0	
Conservative hold		Swing		

Lincoln (2 seats)
Party	Candidate	Votes	%	±%
Independent	Roger David Atterwill	732	49.6	
Conservative	Richard William Duffield	696	47.2	
Conservative	Robert Ramsay Richmond	619	42.0	
Green	Henry Johnson	421	28.5	
Majority		77	5.2	
Registered electors		4,209		
Turnout		1498	35.59	
Rejected ballots		23	1.5	
Independent gain from Conservative		Swing		
Conservative hold		Swing		

Mattishall (2 seats)
Party	Candidate	Votes	%	±%
Conservative	Ian Robert Martin	931	54.5	
Conservative	Paul Donald Claussen	894	52.3	
Independent	Pablo Martin Marino Dimoglou	556	32.5	
Labour	Elizabeth Hunton	508	29.7	
Majority		338	19.8	
Registered electors		4,388		
Turnout		1743	39.72	
Rejected ballots		34	2.0	
Conservative hold		Swing		
Conservative hold		Swing		

Nar Valley
Party	Candidate	Votes	%	±%
Conservative	Peter Samuel Wilkinson	496	74.6	
Labour	Vic Peters	169	25.4	
Majority		327	49.2	
Registered electors		2,197		
Turnout		702	31.95	
Rejected ballots		37	5.3	
Conservative hold		Swing		

Necton
Party	Candidate	Votes	%	±%
Conservative	Nigel Charles Wilkin	445	61.4	
Labour	Joe Sisto	280	38.6	
Majority		165	22.8	
Registered electors		2,124		
Turnout		756	35.59	
Rejected ballots		31	4.1	
Conservative hold		Swing		

Saham Toney (2 seats)
Party	Candidate	Votes	%	±%
Green	Timothy Edward Birt	525	52.3	
Conservative	Helen Susan Crane	522	52.0	
Conservative	Theresa Ruth Hewett	469	46.8	
Majority		53	5.3	
Registered electors		3,958		
Turnout		1020	25.77	
Rejected ballots		17	1.7	
Green gain from Conservative		Swing		
Conservative hold		Swing		

Shipdham With Scarning (2 seats)
Party	Candidate	Votes	%	±%
Conservative	Paul Jonathan Hewett	645	62.7	
Conservative	Lynda Susan Turner	579	56.3	
Labour	Linda Goreham	364	35.4	
Majority		215	20.9	
Registered electors		4,295		
Turnout		1085	25.26	
Rejected ballots		56	5.2	
Conservative hold		Swing		
Conservative hold		Swing		

Swaffham (3 seats)
Party	Candidate	Votes	%	±%
Independent	David Sydney Wickerson	1,187	54.9	
Conservative	Ed Colman	946	43.8	
Conservative	Ian Sherwood	876	40.5	
Conservative	Paul Darby	833	38.5	
Labour	Joanna Navarre	608	28.1	
Labour	John Zielinski	511	23.6	
Majority		43	2.0	
Registered electors		6,365		
Turnout		2199	34.55	
Rejected ballots		37	1.7	
Independent gain from Conservative		Swing		
Conservative hold		Swing		
Conservative hold		Swing		

Thetford Boudica (2 seats)
Party	Candidate	Votes	%	±%
Conservative	Mark Steven Robinson	419	54.1	
Labour	Stuart David Terry	360	46.5	
Conservative	Lesley Elizabeth Polley	335	43.2	
Majority		25	3.2	
Registered electors		3,572		
Turnout		823	23.04	
Rejected ballots		48	5.8	
Conservative hold		Swing		
Labour gain from UKIP		Swing		

Thetford Burrell (2 seats)
Party	Candidate	Votes	%	±%
Labour	Terry Jermy	507	47.3	
Labour	Chris Harvey	400	37.3	
UKIP	Denis Melvin Crawford	236	22.0	
Independent	Carla Barreto	233	21.8	
Conservative	Mia Browne	205	19.1	
Conservative	Jason Allan Smith	188	17.6	
Majority		164	15.3	
Registered electors		4,166		
Turnout		1092	26.21	
Rejected ballots		21	1.9	
Labour hold		Swing		
Labour gain from UKIP		Swing		

Thetford Castle (2 seats)
Party	Candidate	Votes	%	±%
Conservative	Roy Brame	467	50.7	
Conservative	Jane Lilian James	441	47.9	
Labour	David Curzon-Berners	336	36.5	
Labour	Toby Stokes	310	33.7	
Majority		105	11.4	
Registered electors		4,225		
Turnout		1012	23.95	
Rejected ballots		91	9.0	
Conservative hold		Swing		
Conservative gain from UKIP		Swing		

Thetford Priory (2 seats)
Party	Candidate	Votes	%	±%
Labour	Mike Brindle	489	44.8	
Labour	Susan Dowling	410	37.5	
UKIP	Mark Petrie Taylor	394	36.1	
Conservative	G.J. Bamber	243	22.3	
Conservative	David Edward Hills	227	20.8	
Majority		16	1.5	
Registered electors		4,872		
Turnout		1,117	22.93	
Rejected ballots		25	2.2	
Labour gain from UKIP		Swing		
Labour gain from Conservative		Swing		

Upper Wensum (2 seats)
Party	Candidate	Votes	%	±%
Conservative	Stanley Gordon Bambridge	885	52.7	
Conservative	William Patrick Borrett	873	52.0	
Green	Jane Keidan-Cooper	635	37.8	
Liberal Democrats	Mark Foley	521	31.0	
Majority		238	14.2	
Registered electors		4,953		
Turnout		1712	34.56	
Rejected ballots		34	2.0	
Conservative hold		Swing		
Conservative hold		Swing		

Watton (3 seats)
Party	Candidate	Votes	%	±%
Independent	Keith Stephen Gilbert	1,274	69.6	
Conservative	Tina Kiddell	897	49.0	
Conservative	Claire Rosemary Bowes	805	44.0	
Green	Peter Kevin Bate	543	29.7	
Labour	Keith David Prince	287	15.7	
Majority		262	14.3	
Registered electors		6,258		
Turnout		1854	29.63	
Rejected ballots		23	1.2	
Independent hold		Swing		
Conservative hold		Swing		
Conservative hold		Swing		

== Changes 2019–2023 ==
=== By-elections ===
==== Hermitage ====
Hermitage: 2 December 2021
Party	Candidate	Votes	%	±%
Conservative	Robert Hambidge	243	45.0	−26.3
Liberal Democrats	James Minto	221	40.9	N/A
Labour	Paul Siegert	66	12.2	−16.5
Workers Party	Graeme Briggs-White	10	1.9	N/A
Majority		22	4.1	
Turnout		542	23.4	
Conservative hold		Swing	▼33.6	

The by-election was called following the resignation of Conservative councillor Trevor Carter, who stood down from the Hermitage ward for personal reasons in October 2021.

==== Mattishall ====
Mattishall: 9 June 2022
Party	Candidate	Votes	%	±%
Conservative	Paul Plummer	539	41.9	N/A
Independent	Maggie Oechsle	486	37.8	N/A
Labour	Kendra Cogman	260	20.2	N/A
Majority		53	4.1	
Conservative hold		Swing		

This by-election was triggered by the resignation of Conservative councillor Ian Martin in May 2022, after he was diagnosed with motor neurone disease.

==== Thetford Boudica ====
Thetford Boudica: 14 July 2022
Party	Candidate	Votes	%	±%
Labour	Terry Land	398	51.0	+4.7
Conservative	Mac Macdonald	383	49.0	−4.7
Majority		15	2.0	
Turnout		788	21.7	
Labour gain from Conservative		Swing	▲4.7	

The vacancy arose after Conservative councillor Mark Robinson resigned from the Thetford Boudica ward for personal reasons in May 2022.
