= Steff Aquarone =

British politician and entrepreneur

Steff Aquarone MP
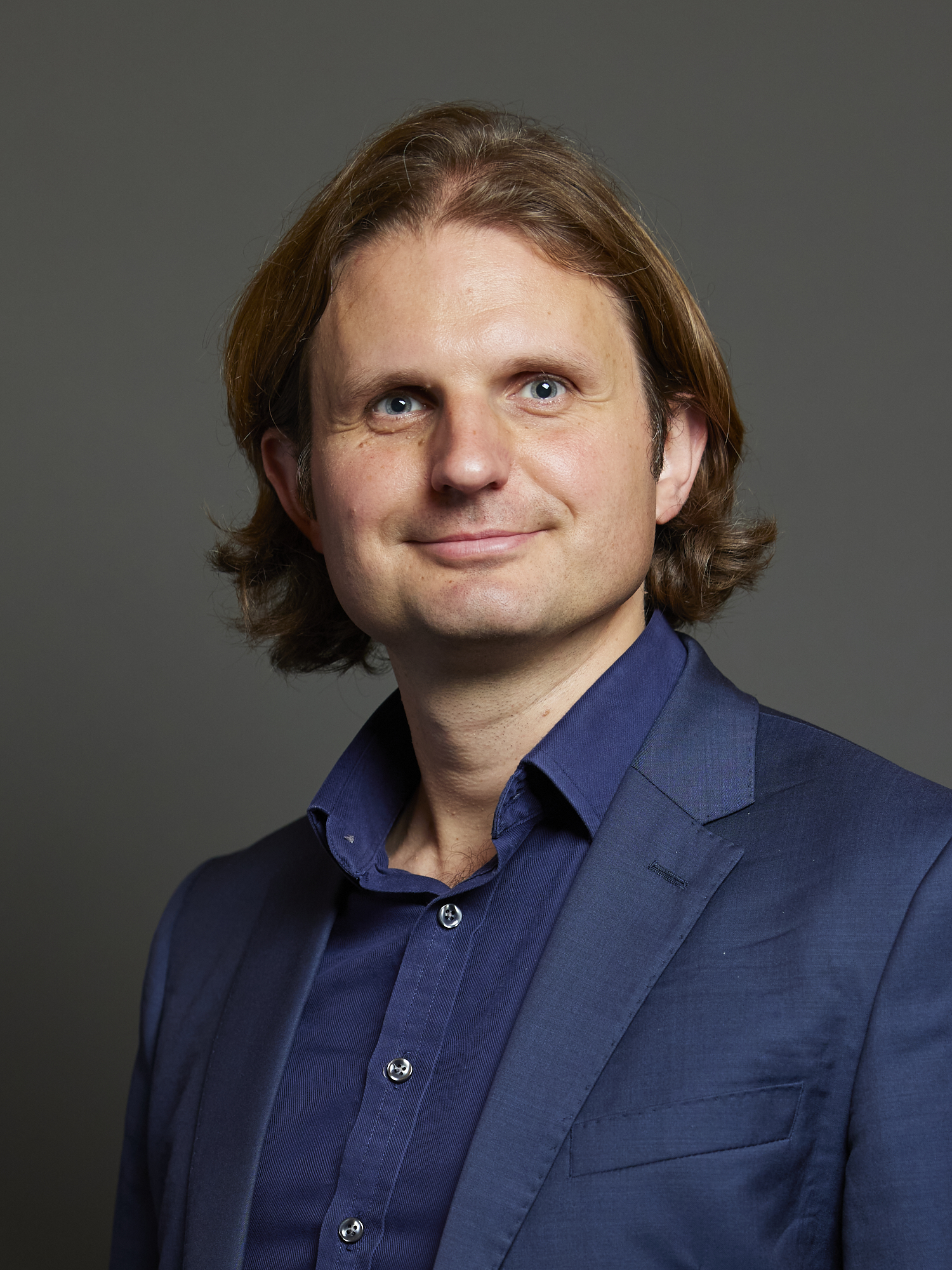
- Official portrait, 2024

Chair of the Liberal Democrats Parliamentary Party
- In office 9 September 2025 – September 2026
- Leader: Ed Davey
- Preceded by: Lisa Smart
- Succeeded by: Roz Savage

Member of Parliament for North Norfolk
- Incumbent
- Assumed office 4 July 2024
- Preceded by: Duncan Baker
- Majority: 2,585 (5.5%)

Liberal Democrat Group Leader on Norfolk County Council
- In office 20 April 2020 – 17 May 2021
- Deputy: Dan Roper
- Preceded by: Ed Maxfield
- Succeeded by: Brian Watkins

Norfolk County Councillor for Melton Constable
- In office 4 May 2017 – 6 May 2026
- Preceded by: David Ramsbotham

Personal details
- Born: Steffan Luke Aquarone; 12 May 1984 (age 42) Blickling, Norfolk, England
- Party: Liberal Democrats
- Spouse: Jill
- Education: Norwich School; University of Warwick
- Profession: Entrepreneur

Steffan Luke Aquarone (born 12 May 1984) is a British Liberal Democrat politician who has been Member of Parliament (MP) for North Norfolk since 2024.

He is also an entrepreneur in film and technology and produced the crowdsourced comedy film Tortoise in Love.

== Education ==
Born and raised in Blickling, Norfolk, Aquarone was educated at home as a member of Education Otherwise until the age of 12, before being privately educated at Norwich School. He then read politics and international relations at the University of Warwick.

== Business ==
In 2011, Aquarone co-founded Droplet, a peer-to-peer mobile payments platform. In May 2015, the company raised £549,020 from 298 investors through the equity crowdfunding platform Crowdcube. In July 2016, fourteen months after the crowdfunding round, Droplet failed and was shut down; in a letter announcing the closure, Aquarone said the company had never reached the scale needed to become a viable profit-making business.

In 2014, Aquarone was named by the Daily Mirror as one of the Top 20 most influential media figures under 30.

== Politics ==
On 4 May 2017, he was elected as county councillor for the Melton Constable division of Norfolk County Council. He was elected deputy leader of the Liberal Democrat group on the council.

He stood in the 2019 general election in the seat of Mid Norfolk finishing third. In April 2020 he replaced Ed Maxfield as group leader on Norfolk County Council. He stood down as leader following the 2021 election.

In September 2022, the Liberal Democrats picked him as the prospective parliamentary candidate for North Norfolk at the 2024 general election. He won the election, gaining the seat from the Conservatives, with 19,488 votes (41.4%) and a majority of 2,585 over the second-placed Conservative candidate. There were five candidates and a turnout of 66%.

In October 2024 he was elected to the Transport Select Committee on a platform of improving rural bus transport.

He was elected Chair of the Liberal Democrat Parliamentary Party in September 2025 beating Anna Sabine, who is Ed Davey's parliamentary private secretary, by 44 votes to 27. In September 2026 he chose not to seek re-election to the role, being succeeded by Roz Savage.

Parliament of the United Kingdom
Preceded by Duncan Baker	Member of Parliament for North Norfolk; 2024–present	Incumbent
