= 2015 Breckland District Council election =

2015 English local government election

- 7 May 2015

All 49 seats to Breckland District Council 25 seats needed for a majority

	First party	Second party
Party	Conservative	UKIP
Seats won	42	4
Seat change	▼5	▲4
Popular vote	49,352	14,648
Percentage	57.0%	16.9%
Swing	▲0.1%	▲12.9%
	Third party	Fourth party
Party	Labour	Independent
Seats won	2	1
Seat change	▼2	▼2
Popular vote	15,259	2,732
Percentage	17.6%	3.2%
Swing	▼6.4%	▼3.1%
- Winner of each seat at the 2015 Breckland District Council election.
Control before election
Conservative
Control after election
Conservative

The 2015 Breckland District Council election took place on 7 May 2015 to elect members of Breckland District Council in Norfolk, England. This was on the same day as the 2015 general election and other local elections.

The whole council was up for election on new ward boundaries, decreasing the number of seats by 5 to 49.

== Previous composition ==
After the 2011 election, 47 councillors were Conservatives, 4 were Labour and 3 were independent. This had changed by 2015 in the following ways:

Party	Seats (2011 election)	Seats (April 2015)
Conservative	47	46
Labour	4	3
Independent	3	3
CPA	-	1
UKIP	-	1
Total	54	

== Summary ==
=== Election result ===
2015 Breckland District Council election
Party	Candidates	Seats	Gains	Losses	Net gain/loss	Seats %	Votes %	Votes	+/−
Conservative	48	42	N/A	N/A	▼5	85.7	57.0	49,352	+0.1
UKIP	18	4	N/A	N/A	▲4	8.2	16.9	14,648	+12.9
Labour	25	2	N/A	N/A	▼2	4.1	17.6	15,259	–6.4
Independent	3	1	N/A	N/A	▼2	2.0	3.2	2,732	–3.1
Green	9	0	N/A	N/A	Steady	0.0	4.8	4,120	–1.1
Liberal Democrats	2	0	0	0	Steady	0.0	0.5	471	–2.5

== Ward results ==
Incumbent councillors standing for re-election are marked with an asterisk (*). Changes in seats do not take into account by-elections or defections.

=== All Saints & Wayland ===
All Saints & Wayland (2 seats)
Party	Candidate	Votes	%
Conservative	John Cowen	1,933	68.3
Conservative	William Smith*	1,709	60.4
UKIP	Giselle Nind	1,008	35.6
Turnout		~2,829	
Conservative win (new seat)			
Conservative win (new seat)			

=== Ashill ===
Ashill
Party	Candidate	Votes	%
Conservative	Frank Sharpe*	755	50.8
UKIP	Emma Parker	495	33.3
Green	Anne Rix	237	15.9
Majority		260	17.5
Turnout		1,487	
Conservative win (new seat)			

=== Attleborough Burgh & Havercroft ===
Attleborough Burgh & Havercroft (2 seats)
Party	Candidate	Votes	%
Conservative	Keith Martin*	1,422	57.9
Conservative	Adrian Stasiak*	998	40.7
Labour	Timothy Mantripp	628	25.6
Independent	Taila Taylor	617	25.1
Turnout		~2,455	
Conservative win (new seat)			
Conservative win (new seat)			

=== Attleborough Queens & Besthorpe ===
Attleborough Queens & Besthorpe (3 seats)
Party	Candidate	Votes	%
Conservative	Karen Pettitt*	1,573	41.4
Conservative	David Oliver	1,429	37.6
Conservative	Tristan Ashby	1,408	37.1
UKIP	Anthony Crouch	900	23.7
Labour	Julian Crutch	726	19.1
Independent	Samantha Taylor	702	18.5
Turnout		~3,798	
Conservative win (new seat)			
Conservative win (new seat)			
Conservative win (new seat)			

=== Bedingfeld ===
Bedingfeld
Party	Candidate	Votes	%
Conservative	Mike Nairn*	Unopposed	
Turnout		N/A	
Conservative win (new seat)			

=== The Buckenhams & Banham ===
The Buckenhams & Banham
Party	Candidate	Votes	%
Conservative	Adrian Joel*	1,272	74.6
Labour	Victor Peters	432	25.4
Majority		840	49.2
Turnout		1,704	
Conservative win (new seat)			

=== Dereham Neatherd ===
Dereham Neatherd (3 seats)
Party	Candidate	Votes	%	±%
Conservative	Linda Monument*	1,589	44.0	
Conservative	William Richmond*	1,339	37.1	
Conservative	Alsion Webb	1,326	36.7	
UKIP	Christopher Harwood	844	23.4	
Labour	Maria Almeida	755	20.9	
Green	Ann Bowyer	708	19.6	
Labour	John Williams	530	14.7	
Turnout		~3,613		
Conservative hold				
Conservative hold				
Conservative win (new seat)				

=== Dereham Toftwood ===
Dereham Toftwood (2 seats)
Party	Candidate	Votes	%	±%
Conservative	Philip Duigan*	1,060	39.1	
Conservative	Kathryn Millbank*	1,003	37.0	
UKIP	Peter Doolan	782	28.9	
Labour	Benedict Baldwin	596	22.0	
Labour	Graham Hayden	524	19.3	
Green	Timothy Birt	465	17.2	
Green	Michael Hirst	209	7.7	
Turnout		~2,711		
Conservative hold				
Conservative hold				

=== Dereham Withburga ===
Dereham Withburga (2 seats)
Party	Candidate	Votes	%
Conservative	Thomas Monument*	1,135	50.0
Labour	Harry Clarke	849	37.4
Labour	Linda Goreham	805	35.5
Conservative	Jeremy Reynolds	795	35.0
Green	Philip Morton	478	21.1
Turnout		~2,270	
Conservative win (new seat)			
Labour win (new seat)			

=== Forest ===
Forest (2 seats)
Party	Candidate	Votes	%
Conservative	John Nunn	712	56.8
Conservative	Samuel Chapman-Allen	708	56.5
Green	Jeffrey Prosser	324	25.8
Green	Sandra Walmsley	278	22.2
Labour	Dennis Sully	268	21.4
Labour	Yvonne Sully	217	17.3
Turnout		~1,254	
Conservative win (new seat)			
Conservative win (new seat)			

=== Guiltcross ===
Guiltcross
Party	Candidate	Votes	%
Conservative	Marion Chapman-Allen*	1,242	70.1
Labour	Jim Waters	530	29.9
Majority		712	40.2
Turnout		1,772	
Conservative win (new seat)			

=== Harling & Heathlands ===
Harling & Heathlands
Party	Candidate	Votes	%	±%
Conservative	Ellen Jolly*	Unopposed		
Turnout		N/A		
Conservative hold				

=== Hermitage ===
Hermitage
Party	Candidate	Votes	%	±%
Conservative	Trevor Carter*	1,016	68.3	
UKIP	John Savory	472	31.7	
Majority		544	36.6	
Turnout		1,488		
Conservative hold		Swing		

=== Launditch ===
Launditch
Party	Candidate	Votes	%	±%
Conservative	Elizabeth Gould*	Unopposed		
Turnout		N/A		
Conservative hold				

=== Lincoln ===
Lincoln (2 seats)
Party	Candidate	Votes	%
Conservative	Richard Duffield*	1,743	67.9
Conservative	Robert Richmond*	1,374	53.5
Green	Alison Keidan-Cooper	1,010	39.3
Turnout		~2,569	
Conservative win (new seat)			
Conservative win (new seat)			

=== Mattishall ===
Mattishall (2 seats)
Party	Candidate	Votes	%
Conservative	Pablo Dimoglou	1,552	52.5
Conservative	Paul Claussen*	1,518	51.3
Labour	Elizabeth Hunton	848	28.7
UKIP	Philip Tye	680	23.0
Labour	Julia Onassis	640	21.6
Turnout		~2,959	
Conservative win (new seat)			
Conservative win (new seat)			

=== Nar Valley ===
Nar Valley
Party	Candidate	Votes	%	±%
Conservative	Peter Wilkinson	816	60.5	
UKIP	David Williams	532	39.5	
Majority		284	21.0	
Turnout		1,348		
Conservative hold		Swing		

=== Necton ===
Necton
Party	Candidate	Votes	%	±%
Conservative	Nigel Wilkin*	882	60.9	
Labour	Joseph Sisto	567	39.1	
Majority		315	21.8	
Turnout		1,449		
Conservative hold		Swing		

=== Saham Toney ===
Saham Toney (2 seats)
Party	Candidate	Votes	%
Conservative	Charles Carter*	1,194	56.7
Conservative	John Rogers*	920	43.7
UKIP	Janet Brown	743	35.3
UKIP	Daniel Fishlock	535	25.4
Green	Peter Bate	411	19.5
Turnout		~2,107	
Conservative win (new seat)			
Conservative win (new seat)			

=== Shipdham with Scarning ===
Shipdham with Scarning (2 seats)
Party	Candidate	Votes	%
Conservative	Paul Hewett	1,387	46.6
Conservative	Lynda Turner*	1,260	42.4
UKIP	Sue Hebborn	885	29.8
Labour	Kimberley Wills	766	25.8
Turnout		~2,975	
Conservative win (new seat)			
Conservative win (new seat)			

=== Swaffham ===
Swaffham (3 seats)
Party	Candidate	Votes	%	±%
Conservative	Paul Darby	Unopposed		
Conservative	Shirley Matthews*	Unopposed		
Conservative	Ian Sherwood*	Unopposed		
Turnout		N/A		
Conservative hold				
Conservative hold				
Conservative hold				

=== Thetford Boudica ===
Thetford Boudica (2 seats)
Party	Candidate	Votes	%
UKIP	Jenny Hollis	750	34.8
Conservative	Mark Robinson*	738	34.3
Conservative	Robert Kybird*	717	33.3
Labour	Dave Hogkinson	500	23.2
Labour	Francesca Robinson	412	19.1
Liberal Democrats	Margaret Rutter	219	10.2
Turnout			
UKIP win (new seat)			
Conservative win (new seat)			

=== Thetford Burrell ===
Thetford Burrell (2 seats)
Party	Candidate	Votes	%
Labour	Terry Jermy*	905	42.6
UKIP	Denis Crawford	828	39.0
Labour	Sadie Harvey	680	32.0
Conservative	Gloria-Jean Bamber	557	26.2
Conservative	Louise Sharman	447	21.1
Turnout		~2,123	
Labour win (new seat)			
UKIP win (new seat)			

=== Thetford Castle ===
Thetford Castle (2 seats)
Party	Candidate	Votes	%
Conservative	Roy Brame	949	40.6
UKIP	John Newton	811	34.7
Conservative	John Moorman	683	29.2
Labour	Christopher Harvey	512	21.9
Labour	Jake Shannon	407	17.4
Liberal Democrats	Daniel Jeffrey	252	10.8
Turnout		~2,339	
Conservative win (new seat)			
UKIP win (new seat)			

=== Thetford Priory ===
Thetford Priory (2 seats)
Party	Candidate	Votes	%
UKIP	Mark Taylor	981	37.9
Conservative	Elizabeth Bishop	877	33.9
Labour	Michael Brindle	786	30.4
Labour	Brenda Canham	671	25.9
Turnout		~2,587	
UKIP win (new seat)			
Conservative win (new seat)			

=== Upper Wensum ===
Upper Wensum (2 seats)
Party	Candidate	Votes	%	±%
Conservative	William Borrett*	1,965	63.9	
Conservative	Stanley Bambridge	1,812	59.0	
UKIP	Gillian Savory	1,185	38.6	
Turnout		~3,074		
Conservative hold				
Conservative win (new seat)				

=== Watton ===
Watton (3 seats)
Party	Candidate	Votes	%	±%
Independent	Keith Gilbert*	1,413	32.1	
Conservative	Claire Bowes*	1,311	29.8	
Conservative	Michael Wassell*	1,245	28.3	
UKIP	Jennifer Fishlock	1,168	26.5	
UKIP	Keith Hebborn	1,049	23.8	
Conservative	Kathryn Hughes	981	22.3	
Labour	Margaret Holmes	705	16.0	
Turnout		~4,406		
Independent hold				
Conservative hold				
Conservative hold				

== By-elections ==
Attleborough Queens And Besthorpe By-Election 5 May 2016
Party	Candidate	Votes	%	±%
Conservative	Stephen Askew	546	42.0	+1.7
Labour	Philip Andrew Spiby	393	30.2	+11.6
Independent	Anthony Frederick Crouch	360	27.7	+27.7
Majority		153	11.8	
Turnout		1,299		
Conservative hold		Swing		

Saham Toney By-Election 16 March 2017
Party	Candidate	Votes	%	±%
Conservative	Theresa Ruth Hewett	335	48.1	−2.8
Liberal Democrats	Andrew Thorpe	105	15.1	+15.1
Independent	Patricia Helena Warwick	104	14.9	+14.9
UKIP	David Williams	80	11.5	−20.1
Labour	Joseph Manuel Sisto	72	10.3	+10.3
Majority		230	33.0	
Turnout		696		
Conservative hold		Swing		

Harling and Heathlands By-Election 4 May 2017
Party	Candidate	Votes	%	±%
Conservative	Robert George Kybird	666	74.9	
Labour	Christopher Harvey	223	25.1	
Majority		443	49.8	
Turnout		889		
Conservative hold		Swing		

Note: swings cannot be given: Harling and Heathlands was previously uncontested.

Thetford Priory By-Election 28 September 2017
Party	Candidate	Votes	%	±%
Labour	Michael Patrick Brindle	503	57.7	+28.0
Conservative	Jane Lillian James	257	29.5	−3.7
UKIP	Dean Roberts	112	12.8	−24.3
Majority		246	28.2	
Turnout		872		
Labour gain from Conservative		Swing		
