= Terry Jermy =

British politician (born 1985)

Terry Jermy MP
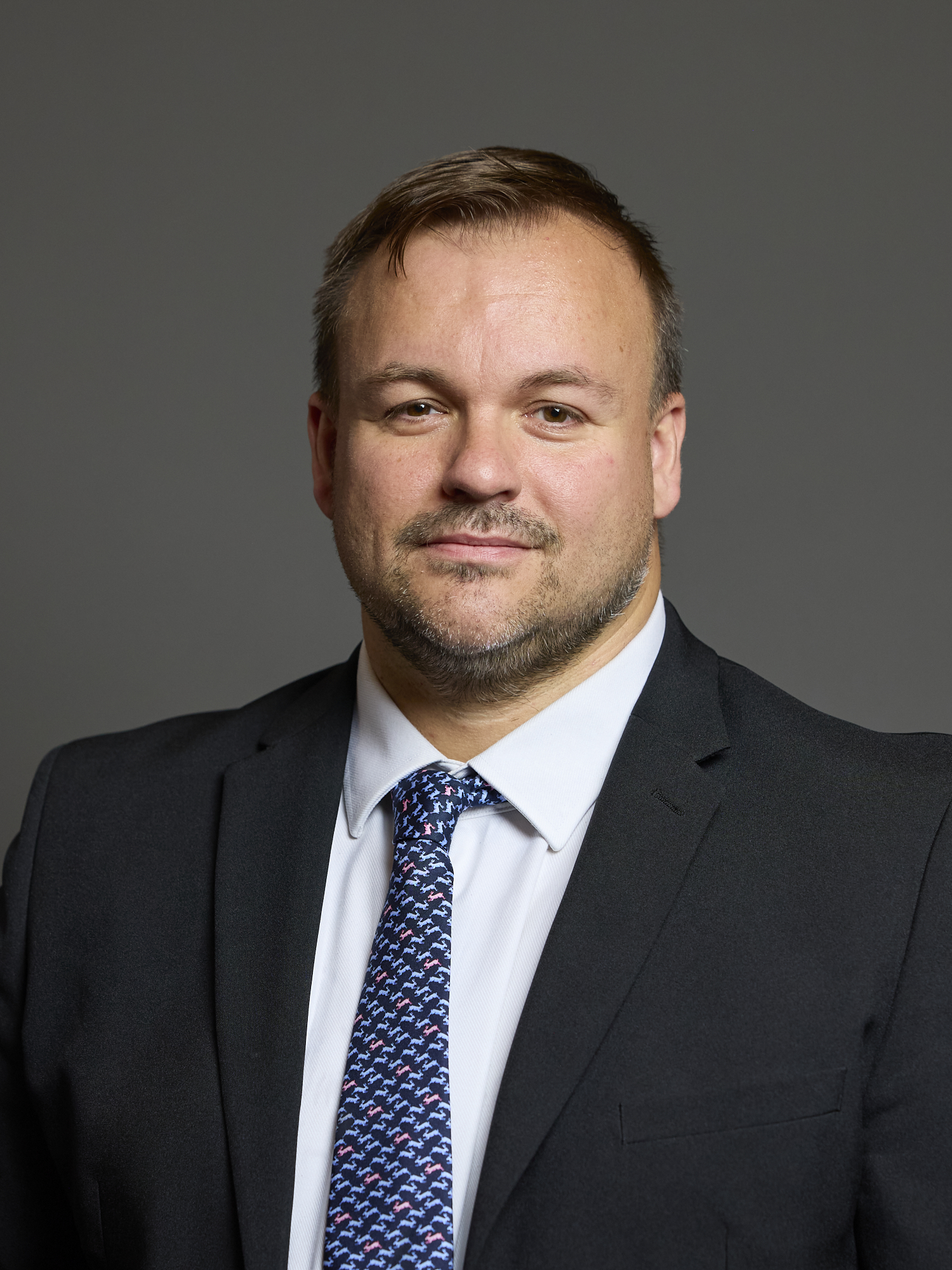
- Official portrait, 2024

Member of Parliament for South West Norfolk
- Incumbent
- Assumed office 4 July 2024
- Preceded by: Liz Truss
- Majority: 630 (1.4%)

Mayor of Thetford
- In office 10 May 2016 – 9 May 2017
- Deputy: Denis Crawford
- Preceded by: Robert Kybird
- Succeeded by: Denis Crawford

Norfolk County Councillor for Thetford West
- In office 2 August 2013 – 11 March 2025
- Preceded by: Peter Georgiou
- Succeeded by: David Bick

Breckland District Councillor for Thetford Priory Thetford Burrell (2015–2023) Thetford Saxon (2011–2015)
- In office 12 May 2011 – 11 March 2025
- Preceded by: William CC Barnes
- Succeeded by: Michael Westman

Thetford Town Councillor for Priory Burrell (2015–2023) Saxon (2008–2015)
- In office July 2008 – 2023
- Preceded by: Gareth Pickering

Personal details
- Born: Terry James Jermy; 18 August 1985 (age 41) Thetford, Norfolk, England
- Party: Labour
- Education: Charles Burrell Humanities School; City College Norwich
- Website: terryjermy.com

Terry James Jermy (born 18 August 1985) is a British politician and journalist who has been the Member of Parliament (MP) for South West Norfolk since 2024. A member of the Labour Party, he defeated former prime minister Liz Truss, who had represented the constituency since 2010. Prior to becoming an MP, Jermy had also previously served on the Norfolk County Council, Breckland District Council and Thetford Town Council.

== Early life and education ==
Jermy was born on 18 August 1985 in Thetford, Norfolk. His father, Trevor, was a welder fabricator. Jermy attended Charles Burrell Humanities School and City College Norwich. He bought the About Thetford magazine from its previous owners in 2014 and served as its editor until his election to parliament, though he remains its owner.

== Political career ==
In July 2008, Jermy was elected as a Labour Party councillor for Saxon ward (renamed Burrell ward in 2015) in a Thetford Town Council by-election. He was re-elected to the town council in 2011. That same year, Jermy was elected as a Labour councillor for the Thetford Saxon ward on the Breckland District Council. In the 2013 Norfolk County Council election, Jermy stood as the Labour candidate for Thetford West, finishing in second place behind UKIP candidate Peter Georgiou by only one vote. However, Georgiou resigned weeks later due to shoplifting accusations and Jermy won the seat in the August 2013 by-election.

He was re-elected to his now-renamed Thetford Burrell seat in the 2015 Breckland District Council election. In May 2016, he was appointed Mayor of Thetford on a one-year term, becoming the first openly gay mayor of the town. He was succeeded as mayor by his deputy, UKIP councillor Denis Crawford, in May 2017. Jermy retained his Thetford West seat in the 2017 Norfolk County Council election. He was re-elected to both the district council and the town council in 2019. In the 2021 Norfolk County Council election, Jermy held his Thetford West seat.

In 2023, Jermy was re-elected to the district council, now for Thetford Priory ward, and the town council, now for Priory ward. In February 2024, he was selected as the Labour candidate for South West Norfolk in the 2024 general election. He received little support from the national Labour Party campaign and had to raise £15,000 for his local campaign via crowdfunding. He won the seat in the general election with a majority of 630 votes and just over a quarter of the votes cast (26.7%), which was the lowest winning vote share in the general election. By winning the seat, Jermy unseated former Conservative prime minister Liz Truss, who had represented the seat since 2010, and became the first Labour MP for the constituency since Albert Hilton, who lost the seat in 1964. The Spectator labelled Jermy's victory "the Portillo moment of 2024".

Jermy resigned from his county and district council positions in March 2025, but remains a town councillor.

== Personal life ==
Jermy is gay. His father, Trevor, died on 29 January 2023, aged 65, from stroke complications while in a medically-induced coma at West Suffolk Hospital. Jermy was inspired by his father's death to stand for a parliamentary seat.

== Electoral performance ==
=== House of Commons ===
General election 2024: South West Norfolk
Party	Candidate	Votes	%	±%
Labour	Terry Jermy	11,847	26.7	+8.4
Conservative	Liz Truss	11,217	25.3	–43.4
Reform	Toby McKenzie	9,958	22.4	New
Independent	James Bagge	6,282	14.2	New
Liberal Democrats	Josie Ratcliffe	2,618	5.9	−2.4
Green	Pallavi Devulapalli	1,838	4.1	+1.1
Monster Raving Loony	Earl Elvis of East Anglia	338	0.8	−0.9
Heritage	Gary Conway	160	0.4	New
Communist	Lorraine Douglas	77	0.2	New
Majority		630	1.4	
Turnout		44,335	59.3	–6.3
Labour gain from Conservative		Swing	+25.8	

=== Norfolk County Council ===
2021 Norfolk County Council election: Thetford West
Party	Candidate	Votes	%	±%
Labour Co-op	Terry Jermy	1,204	56.9	+5.4
Conservative	Barbara Tullett	720	34.0	+0.8
Liberal Democrats	Martin Callam	101	4.8	New
Independent	Philip Wagstaff	91	4.3	New
Majority		484	22.9	+4.6
Turnout		2,137	22.2	–4.7
Labour Co-op hold		Swing	+2.3	

2017 Norfolk County Council election: Thetford West
Party	Candidate	Votes	%	±%
Labour	Terry Jermy	1,323	51.5	+16.2
Conservative	Jane James	853	33.2	+17.9
UKIP	John Newton	392	15.3	−20.1
Majority		470	18.3	+18.3
Turnout		2,568	26.8	+3.0
Labour hold		Swing	+18.2	

August 2013 Thetford West by-election
Party	Candidate	Votes	%	±%
Labour	Terry Jermy	1,071		
UKIP	John Newton	900		
Conservative	Tristan Ashby	282		
Independent	Daniel Jeffrey	78		
Green	Sandra Walmsley	40		
Majority		171		
Turnout		2,371	24.6	
Labour gain from UKIP				

2013 Norfolk County Council election: Thetford West
Party	Candidate	Votes	%	±%
UKIP	Peter Georgiou	814	35.4	New
Labour	Terry Jermy	813	35.4	+7.4
Conservative	Tristan Ashby	353	15.4	−19.6
CPA	Carl Clark	134	5.8	New
Liberal Democrats	Daniel Jeffrey	122	5.3	−31.7
Green	Sandra Walmsley	64	2.8	New
Majority		1	0.0	
Turnout		2,300	23.8	−3.7
UKIP gain from Liberal Democrats		Swing	+33.6	

=== Breckland District Council ===
2023 Breckland District Council election: Thetford Priory (2 seats)
Party	Candidate	Votes	%	±%
Labour	Terry Jermy	629	56.6	+19.1
Labour	Mike Brindle	551	49.6	+4.8
Independent	Ron Wood	320	28.8	New
No description	Gordon Margrie	200	18.0	New
No description	Mark Taylor	199	17.9	New
Turnout		1,136	22.8	
Labour hold				
Labour hold				

2019 Breckland District Council election: Thetford Burrell (2 seats)
Party	Candidate	Votes	%	±%
Labour	Terry Jermy	507	47.3	
Labour	Chris Harvey	400	37.3	
UKIP	Denis Crawford	236	22.0	
Independent	Carla Barreto	233	21.8	New
Conservative	Mia Browne	205	19.1	
Conservative	Jason Smith	188	17.6	
Turnout		1,092	26.2	
Labour hold				
Labour gain from UKIP				

2015 Breckland District Council election: Thetford Burrell (2 seats)
Party	Candidate	Votes	%	±%
Labour	Terry Jermy	905	39.5	
UKIP	Denis Crawford	828	36.2	
Labour	Sadie Harvey	680		
Conservative	Gloria-Jean Bamber	557	24.3	
Conservative	Louise Sharman	447		
Turnout			49.1	
Labour hold				
UKIP gain from Labour				

2011 Breckland District Council election: Thetford Saxon (3 seats)
Party	Candidate	Votes	%	±%
Labour	Terry Jermy	659	34.4	
Labour	Sylvia Armes	528		
Conservative	Mark Robinson	409	21.3	
Labour	Yvonne Rout	399		
Conservative	Marion Chapman-Allen	397		
UKIP	Denis Crawford	388	20.2	
Conservative	Paul Kybird	383		
Independent	Bob Waple	315		
Green	Sandra Walmsley	146		
Turnout		3,624		
Labour hold				
Labour gain from Conservative				
Conservative hold				

== See also ==
- South West Norfolk in the 2024 United Kingdom general election

Parliament of the United Kingdom
Preceded by Liz Truss	Member of Parliament for South West Norfolk; 2024–present	Incumbent
Political offices
Preceded by Peter Georgiou	Norfolk County Councillor for Thetford West; 2013–2025	Succeeded by Michael Westman
Preceded by Pat Balaam	Breckland District Councillor for Thetford Priory formerly Thetford Burrell (2015–2023) and Thetford Saxon (2011–2015); 2011–2025	Succeeded by Michael Westman
Preceded by Gareth Pickering	Thetford Town Councillor for Priory formerly Burrell (2015–2023) and Saxon (2008–2015); 2008–present	Incumbent
