= Matthews Kempson =

English educationalist, colonial administrator, and cricketer

Simon Kempson
Personal information
- Full name: Simon Matthews Edwin Kempson
- Born: 3 May 1831; Castle Bromwich, Birmingham, England
- Died: 20 June 1894 (aged 63); Uley, Gloucestershire, England
- Batting: Right-handed
- Bowling: Right-arm round-arm medium-pace
- Relatives: Son of the vicar of Castle Bromwich

Domestic team information
- Years: Team
- 1851–1856: Cambridge University
- 1853–1865: Marylebone Cricket Club (MCC)
- 1853: Gentlemen

Simon Matthews Edwin Kempson (3 May 1831 – 20 June 1894) was an English educationalist and colonial administrator who also played first-class cricket for Cambridge University, the Marylebone Cricket Club (MCC) and the Gentlemen. He was born at Castle Bromwich, Birmingham and died at Uley, Gloucestershire.

== Cricket career ==
Kempson was a right-handed middle-order batsman and a right-arm round-arm medium-pace bowler. His first match that is now considered to have been first-class was the 1851 University Match between Cambridge University and Oxford when he played as a lower-order batsman and scored 48 in the only Cambridge innings: this remained his highest first-class score. He did not bowl in that game but by the time of his next match in 1852, against the Cambridge Town Club, he was batting further up the order (though less successfully) and opening the bowling, taking six first innings in a very low-scoring match, though the detailed analysis is not available.

1853 was Kempson's best season as a bowler: he took 38 wickets in just five matches. They included six wickets in each innings for Cambridge University against Marylebone Cricket Club. He had limited success in his second University Match against Oxford, but was then picked for the Gentlemen against the Players, where, in a rare victory for the amateurs by 60 runs, he bowled unchanged through both Players' innings with Sir Frederick Bathurst, 24 years his senior, and took nine wickets to Bathurst's 11. His next first-class cricket came in two matches for Cambridge University in 1856 in which he took 21 wickets in all, including his best figures of seven wickets in an innings against MCC, though the full analysis is not known. Beyond this, he played no more first-class cricket except for a single game for MCC in 1865 when he took no wickets, scored no runs and was absent for the second innings.

== Career outside cricket ==
The son of the vicar of Castle Bromwich, Matthews Kempson was educated at Cheltenham College as one of its first pupils when it opened in 1841 and at Gonville and Caius College, Cambridge. At Cheltenham, he was captain of the cricket team for three years and was remembered, 100 years after he went there, for having dispatched the bowling of an England player out of the college grounds and into the road outside.

After graduation, Kempson went to India as a teacher; from 1858 he was headmaster of the Government College at Bareilly and then an Inspector of Schools in Agra. From 1862 to 1878 he was "director of public instruction" in the North West Provinces before returning to England where he was a teacher of Indian history and oriental languages at Cambridge University. He published books on the Hindustani language and translations of Hindustani works.

He does not appear to have been related to William Kempson, his near contemporary who also played first-class cricket for Cambridge University and amateur sides in the mid 1850s.
