= William Kempson =

English soldier and cricketer

William John Kempson (23 March 1835 – 21 November 1877) was an English soldier and cricketer who played first-class cricket for the Gentlemen of England amateur team and for Cambridge University in the 1850s. He was born in Newcastle upon Tyne and died at Folkestone, Kent.

Kempson was educated at Rugby School and matriculated at Trinity College, Cambridge in 1854, though there is no evidence that he took a degree. In both 1853 and 1854, he played a single first-class cricket match for the Gentlemen of England amateur team as a middle-order batsman. His single game for Cambridge University was the 1855 University Match against Oxford University in which he top-scored in the Cambridge first innings with 45 – by some distance his own best score in important matches – though the match was narrowly lost. He made further single appearances for the Gentlemen of England side in 1855 and 1858.

Kempson joined the British Army and was a major in the 99th Regiment of Foot, where he took part in the 1860 war in China and was at the battle at the Taku Forts and the sacking of Beijing. He is recorded in the London Gazette in 1870 as transferring to the 31st Regiment of Foot with the rank of captain.

He does not appear to have been related to Matthews Kempson, his near contemporary who also played first-class cricket for Cambridge University and amateur sides in the mid 1850s.

In 1864, he married Louisa Frances Wedgwood (1834–1903. First child of Henry Allen). They had four children, 1. Jessie 1867–1939; 2. Hester Louisa 1869–1930; 3. John Wedgwood 1870–1958 and 4. Lucy Caroline 1874–1958). They were frequent visitors to Down House, home of Charles Darwin in Downe, Kent. Their many visits are recorded in the diary of Emma Darwin (1808–1896), wife of Charles Darwin (1809–1882).
