= Kempstone =

Village in Norfolk, England

Coordinates: 52.7089°N 0.7856°E

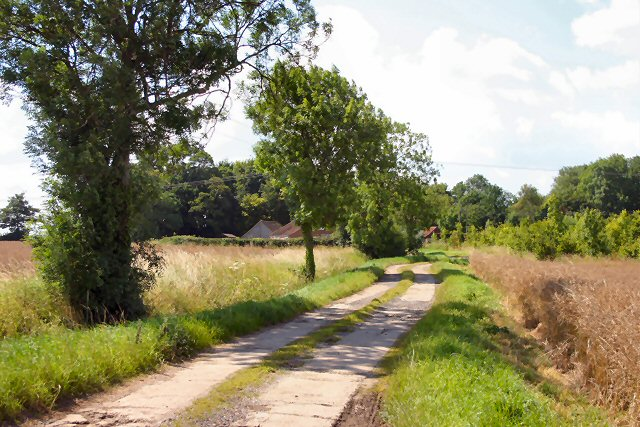
- Track to Kempstone Cottages

- Location within Norfolk
- Area: 1.28 sq mi (3.3 km^{2})
- OS grid reference: TF8827815999
- District: Breckland
- Shire county: Norfolk
- Region: East
- Country: England
- Sovereign state: United Kingdom
- Post town: King's Lynn
- Postcode district: PE32
- Dialling code: 01328
- Police: Norfolk
- Fire: Norfolk
- Ambulance: East of England
- UK Parliament: South West Norfolk

Kempstone is a village and civil parish situated in the English county of Norfolk.

Kempston is located 6.7 miles (10.8 km) north-west of Dereham and 22 miles (35 km) west of Norwich.

== History ==
Kempstone's name is of Anglo-Saxon origin and derives from the Old English for Cymi's farmstead.

In the Domesday Book, Kempstone is listed as a settlement of 9 households in the hundred of Laundich. In 1086, the village was part of the East Anglian estates of William de Warenne.

== Geography ==
Due to its small size, separate population statistics are not available for Kempstone as it is amalgamated with Great Dunham.

== St. Paul's Church ==
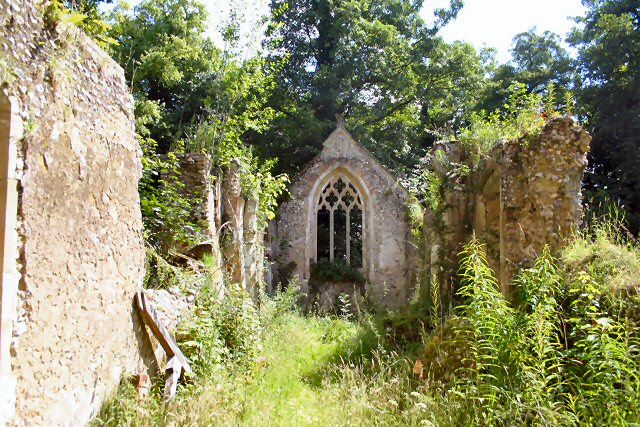
The ruins of St Paul's church

The ruins of St. Paul's Church, which formerly served the parish, are within the parish. The church collapsed in the 1950s.

== Governance ==
Kempstone is part of the electoral ward of Launditch for local elections and is part of the district of Breckland.

The village's national constituency is South West Norfolk which has been represented by Labour's Terry Jermy MP since 2024.
