= 2011 Breckland District Council election =

2011 English local government election

- 5 May 2011

All 54 seats to Breckland District Council 28 seats needed for a majority

	First party	Second party	Third party
Party	Conservative	Labour	Independent
Seats won	47	4	3
Seat change	▼1	▲1	Steady
Popular vote	29,825	12,581	3,279
Percentage	56.9%	24.0%	6.3%
Swing	▼5.3%	▲6.2	▼2.2%
- Winner of each seat at the 2011 Breckland District Council election.
Control before election
Conservative
Control after election
Conservative

The 2011 Breckland District Council election took place on 5 May 2011 to elect members of Breckland District Council in Norfolk, England. This was on the same day as other local elections.

== Summary ==
=== Election result ===
2011 Breckland District Council election
Party	Candidates	Seats	Gains	Losses	Net gain/loss	Seats %	Votes %	Votes	+/−
Conservative	52	47	1	2	▼1	87.0	56.9	29,825	–5.3
Labour	35	4	2	1	▲1	7.4	24.0	12,581	+6.2
Independent	9	3	0	0	Steady	5.6	6.3	3,279	–2.2
Green	14	0	0	0	Steady	0.0	5.9	3,090	–0.3
UKIP	7	0	0	0	Steady	0.0	4.0	2,083	+3.3
Liberal Democrats	6	0	0	0	Steady	0.0	3.0	1,552	–1.7

== Ward results ==
Incumbent councillors standing for re-election are marked with an asterisk (*). Changes in seats do not take into account by-elections or defections.

=== All Saints ===
All Saints
Party	Candidate	Votes	%	±%
Conservative	Bill Smith*	Unopposed		
Registered electors		1,884		
Conservative hold		Swing		

=== Buckenham ===
Buckenham
Party	Candidate	Votes	%	±%
Conservative	Adrian Joel*	520	69.4	
Independent	Timothy Bornett	127	17.0	
Labour	Roger Fryatt	95	12.7	
Majority		393	52.4	
Turnout		742	53.7	
Registered electors		1,392		
Conservative hold		Swing		

=== Burgh & Haverscroft ===
Burgh & Haverscroft (2 seats)
Party	Candidate	Votes	%	±%
Conservative	Keith Martin*	772	62.0	
Conservative	Adrian Stasiak*	592	47.5	
Labour	Julian Crutch	387	31.1	
Turnout		~1,246	41.4	
Registered electors		3,008		
Conservative hold				
Conservative hold				

=== Conifer ===
Conifer
Party	Candidate	Votes	%	±%
Conservative	Ann Steward*	471	71.0	
Independent	Peter Knights	192	29.0	
Majority		279	42.1	
Turnout		663	44.5	
Registered electors		1,515		
Conservative hold		Swing		

=== Dereham-Central ===
Dereham-Central (2 seats)
Party	Candidate	Votes	%	±%
Conservative	Thomas Monument	705	42.4	
Labour	Robin Foreham*	678	40.7	
Labour	Michael Fanthorpe*	659	39.6	
Conservative	Antonio Choca	559	33.6	
Green	Sinead Bowyer	263	15.8	
Turnout		~1,664	35.7	
Registered electors		4,660		
Conservative gain from Labour				
Labour hold				

=== Dereham-Humbletoft ===
Dereham-Humbletoft
Party	Candidate	Votes	%	±%
Conservative	Stuart Green	358	48.2	
Labour	Linda Goreham	266	35.8	
Green	David Bowyer	118	15.9	
Majority		92	12.4	
Turnout		758	37.2	
Registered electors		2,039		
Conservative hold		Swing		

=== Dereham-Neatherd ===
Dereham-Neatherd (2 seats)
Party	Candidate	Votes	%	±%
Conservative	Linda Monument*	777	55.3	
Conservative	William Richmond	651	46.3	
Green	Ann Bowyer	354	25.2	
Labour	Michael Bennett	282	20.1	
Labour	Craig Warmer	224	15.9	
Green	Bryan Darnell	200	14.2	
Turnout		~1,406	41.7	
Registered electors		3,371		
Conservative hold				
Conservative hold				

=== Dereham-Toftwood ===
Dereham-Toftwood (2 seats)
Party	Candidate	Votes	%	±%
Conservative	Kate Millbank*	698	50.1	
Conservative	Phillip Duigan*	694	49.9	
Green	Timothy Birt	346	24.9	
Labour	Maria Almeida	345	24.8	
Labour	Patricia Arnold	308	22.1	
Turnout		~1,392	37.7	
Registered electors		3,692		
Conservative hold				
Conservative hold				

=== East Guiltcross ===
East Guiltcross
Party	Candidate	Votes	%	±%
Conservative	Stephen Askew*	480	70.6	
Labour	Ann Lambert	200	29.4	
Majority		280	41.2	
Turnout		680	41.7	
Registered electors		1,674		
Conservative hold		Swing		

=== Eynsford ===
Eynsford
Party	Candidate	Votes	%	±%
Conservative	Gordon Bambridge*	597	68.9	
Labour	Natasha Chamberlain	269	31.1	
Majority		328	37.8	
Turnout		866	47.1	
Registered electors		1,858		
Conservative hold		Swing		

=== Haggard De Toni ===
Haggard De Toni
Party	Candidate	Votes	%	±%
Conservative	Charles Carter	593	72.9	
UKIP	Paul Thompson	220	27.1	
Majority		373	45.8	
Turnout		813	47.4	
Registered electors		1,797		
Conservative win (new seat)				

=== Harling & Heathlands ===
Harling & Heathlands (2 seats)
Party	Candidate	Votes	%	±%
Conservative	Kay Fisher*	928	61.6	
Conservative	Ellen Jolly	875	58.1	
Labour	Stephen Green	403	26.7	
Turnout		~1,507	45.3	
Registered electors		3,327		
Conservative hold				
Conservative hold				

=== Hermitage ===
Hermitage
Party	Candidate	Votes	%	±%
Conservative	Trevor Carter	526	56.7	
Labour	John Williams	230	24.8	
UKIP	James Leigh-Wood	171	18.4	
Majority		296	31.9	
Turnout		927	55.1	
Registered electors		1,708		
Conservative win (new seat)				

=== Launditch ===
Launditch
Party	Candidate	Votes	%	±%
Conservative	Mark Kiddle-Morris*	522	59.3	
Labour	Tom Goreham	215	24.4	
UKIP	Toby Coke	144	16.3	
Majority		307	34.9	
Turnout		881	54.7	
Registered electors		1,627		
Conservative hold		Swing		

=== Mid Forest ===
Mid Forest
Party	Candidate	Votes	%	±%
Conservative	Bernard English	Unopposed		
Registered electors		1,580		
Conservative hold		Swing		

=== Nar Valley ===
Nar Valley
Party	Candidate	Votes	%	±%
Conservative	Dave Williams*	469	58.6	
UKIP	Anna Hamilton	332	41.4	
Majority		137	17.2	
Turnout		801	46.3	
Registered electors		1,786		
Conservative hold		Swing		

=== Necton ===
Necton
Party	Candidate	Votes	%	±%
Conservative	Nigel Wilkin*	465	61.3	
Labour	Joe Sisto	293	38.7	
Majority		172	22.6	
Turnout		758	46.8	
Registered electors		1,632		
Conservative hold		Swing		

=== Queens ===
Queens (3 seats)
Party	Candidate	Votes	%	±%
Conservative	Simon Rogers	Unopposed		
Conservative	Alec Byrne*	Unopposed		
Conservative	Jenny North	Unopposed		
Registered electors		5,504		
Conservative hold				
Conservative hold				
Conservative hold				

=== Shipdham ===
Shipdham
Party	Candidate	Votes	%	±%
Conservative	Lynda Turner	323	48.0	
Independent	Ivan Chubbock	225	33.4	
Labour	Graham Hayden	125	18.6	
Majority		98	14.6	
Turnout		673	40.2	
Registered electors		1,684		
Conservative hold		Swing		

=== Springvale & Scarning ===
Springvale & Scarning (2 seats)
Party	Candidate	Votes	%	±%
Conservative	Elizabeth Gould*	840	54.6	
Conservative	Diana Irving	786	51.1	
Labour	Lew Pearson	427	27.7	
Green	Jane Keidan-Cooper	395	25.7	
Turnout		~1,539	40.5	
Registered electors		3,801		
Conservative hold				
Conservative hold				

=== Swaffham ===
Swaffham (3 seats)
Party	Candidate	Votes	%	±%
Conservative	Shirley Matthews*	1,299	57.8	
Conservative	Ian Sherwood*	1,150	51.2	
Conservative	Frank Sharpe*	1,055	47.0	
Labour	Sandra Kerridge	610	27.1	
Liberal Democrats	Charles Gunner	504	22.4	
Labour	Thelma Paines	436	19.4	
Labour	Yvonne Sully	421	18.7	
Turnout		~2,247	39.9	
Registered electors		5,631		
Conservative hold				
Conservative hold				
Conservative hold				

=== Swanton Morley ===
Swanton Morley
Party	Candidate	Votes	%	±%
Conservative	Robert Richmond	422	46.4	
Independent	Trevor Wood	343	37.7	
Green	Jane Ironside	145	15.9	
Majority		79	8.7	
Turnout		910	51.4	
Registered electors		1,797		
Conservative win (new seat)				

=== Taverner ===
Taverner
Party	Candidate	Votes	%	±%
Conservative	Richard Duffield*	619	74.0	
Labour	Nick Terrett	218	26.0	
Majority		401	48.0	
Turnout		837	47.5	
Registered electors		1,791		
Conservative hold		Swing		

=== Templar ===
Templar
Party	Candidate	Votes	%	±%
Conservative	John Rogers*	Unopposed		
Registered electors		2,300		
Conservative hold		Swing		

=== Thetford-Abbey ===
Thetford-Abbey (2 seats)
Party	Candidate	Votes	%	±%
Independent	Pauline Quadling*	385	39.9	
Labour	Carl Clark	273	28.3	
Labour	Brenda Canham	266	27.6	
Conservative	Mike Spencer*	253	26.2	
Liberal Democrats	Mike Brindle	229	23.8	
Green	Jeff Davey	99	10.3	
Turnout		~964	26.1	
Registered electors		3,696		
Independent hold				
Labour gain from Conservative				

=== Thetford-Castle ===
Thetford-Castle
Party	Candidate	Votes	%	±%
Independent	Terence Lamb*	242	41.4	
Conservative	Roy Brame	191	32.7	
Green	Julia Yelloly	99	17.0	
Liberal Democrats	Danny Jeffrey	52	8.9	
Majority		51	8.7	
Turnout		584	38.8	
Registered electors		1,533		
Independent hold		Swing		

=== Thetford-Guildhall ===
Thetford-Guildhall (3 seats)
Party	Candidate	Votes	%	±%
Conservative	Robert Kybird*	821	46.1	
Conservative	Pam Spencer*	793	44.5	
Conservative	Bryan Skull	712	40.0	
Labour	Ray Key	553	31.0	
Labour	Ray Barker	500	28.1	
Labour	Mariusz Gozdek	362	20.3	
Liberal Democrats	John Rutter	307	17.2	
Liberal Democrats	Margaret Rutter	288	16.2	
Turnout		~1,781	32.1	
Registered electors		5,550		
Conservative hold				
Conservative hold				
Conservative hold				

=== Thetford-Saxon ===
Thetford-Saxon (3 seats)
Party	Candidate	Votes	%	±%
Labour	Terry Jermy	659	39.9	
Labour	Sylvia Armes	528	32.0	
Conservative	Mark Robinson	409	24.8	
Labour	Dennis Sully	399	24.2	
Conservative	Marion Chapman-Allen*	397	24.0	
UKIP	Denis Crawford	388	23.5	
Conservative	Paul Kybird	383	23.2	
Independent	Bob Waple	315	19.1	
Independent	Yvonne Rout	233	14.1	
Green	Sandra Walmsley	146	8.8	
Turnout		~1,651	31.4	
Registered electors		5,262		
Labour hold				
Labour gain from Conservative				
Conservative hold				

=== Two Rivers ===
Two Rivers (2 seats)
Party	Candidate	Votes	%	±%
Conservative	Paul Claussen*	809	53.7	
Conservative	Brian Rose*	791	52.5	
Labour	Harry Clarke	410	27.2	
Green	Andrew Mitchell	326	21.6	
Turnout		~1,507	45.4	
Registered electors		3,320		
Conservative hold				
Conservative hold				

=== Upper Wensum ===
Upper Wensum
Party	Candidate	Votes	%	±%
Conservative	Bill Borrett*	592	67.2	
UKIP	John Savory	289	32.8	
Majority		303	34.4	
Turnout		881	52.8	
Registered electors		1,775		
Conservative hold		Swing		

=== Upper Yare ===
Upper Yare
Party	Candidate	Votes	%	±%
Conservative	Cliff Jordan*	730	74.0	
Labour	Benjamin MacAnn	256	26.0	
Majority		474	48.0	
Turnout		986	52.9	
Registered electors		1,919		
Conservative hold		Swing		

=== Watton ===
Watton (3 seats)
Party	Candidate	Votes	%	±%
Conservative	Claire Bowes*	1,179	53.5	
Independent	Keith Gilbert*	1,158	52.5	
Conservative	Michael Wassell	1,014	46.0	
Labour	Margaret Holmes	544	24.7	
UKIP	Graham Langford	539	24.4	
Labour	Christopher Walls	409	18.5	
Turnout		~2,205	38.4	
Registered electors		5,744		
Conservative hold				
Independent hold				
Conservative hold				

=== Wayland ===
Wayland
Party	Candidate	Votes	%	±%
Conservative	Phil Cowen*	574	72.9	
Green	Vanessa King	213	27.1	
Majority		361	45.8	
Turnout		787	47.4	
Registered electors		1,689		
Conservative hold		Swing		

=== Weeting ===
Weeting
Party	Candidate	Votes	%	±%
Conservative	Robert Childerhouse*	465	59.7	
Green	Jeffrey Prosser	184	23.6	
Labour	David Hodgkinson	130	16.7	
Majority		281	36.1	
Turnout		779	43.8	
Registered electors		1,795		
Conservative hold		Swing		

=== West Guiltcross ===
West Guiltcross
Party	Candidate	Votes	%	±%
Conservative	William Nunn*	491	56.8	
Labour	Jim Waters	201	23.3	
Liberal Democrats	Steve Gordon	172	19.9	
Majority		290	33.5	
Turnout		864	49.5	
Registered electors		1,764		
Conservative hold		Swing		

=== Wissey ===
Wissey
Party	Candidate	Votes	%	±%
Conservative	Paul Darby	475	49.0	
Independent	Jill Ball*	292	30.1	
Green	Alison Haines	202	20.8	
Majority		183	18.9	
Turnout		969	51.1	
Registered electors		1,934		
Conservative hold		Swing		

== By-elections ==
Queen's By-Election 19 July 2012
Party	Candidate	Votes	%	±%
Conservative	Karen Pettitt	489	51.9	
Labour	John Williams	454	48.1	
Majority		35	3.8	
Turnout		943		
Conservative hold		Swing		

Note: swings cannot be given: Queen's was previously uncontested.

Harling and Heathlands By-Election 26 July 2012
Party	Candidate	Votes	%	±%
Conservative	Marion Chapman-Allen	453	48.5	−21.2
UKIP	Denis Crawford	184	19.7	+19.7
Labour	Stephen Green	168	18.0	−12.3
Liberal Democrats	Steve Gordon	129	13.8	+13.8
Majority		269	28.8	
Turnout		934		
Conservative hold		Swing		

Mid Forest By-Election 26 July 2012
Party	Candidate	Votes	%	±%
Conservative	Mike Nairn	257	63.0	
Labour	Alexander Vyse	151	37.0	
Majority		106	26.0	
Turnout		408		
Conservative hold		Swing		

Note: swings cannot be given: Mid Forest was previously uncontested.
