= South West Norfolk in the 2024 United Kingdom general election =

Election to the House of Commons

2024 United Kingdom general election in South West Norfolk
- 4 July 2024

South West Norfolk constituency
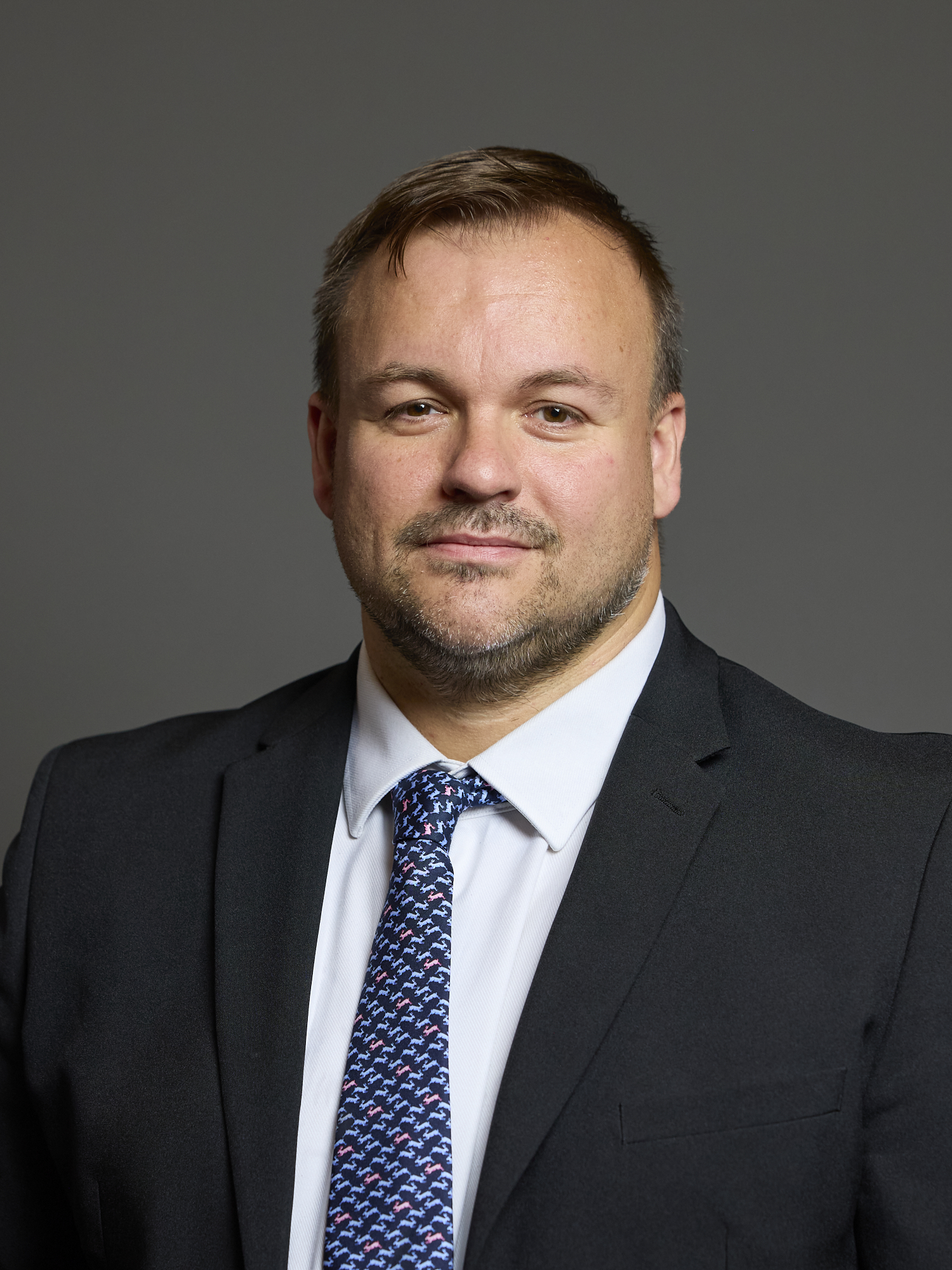

	First party	Second party	Third party
Candidate	Terry Jermy	Liz Truss	Toby McKenzie
Party	Labour	Conservative	Reform
Popular vote	11,847	11,217	9,958
Percentage	26.7%	25.3%	22.4%
Swing	▲8.6 pp	▼43.7 pp	New
	Fourth party	Fifth party
Candidate	James Bagge	Josie Ratcliffe
Party	Independent	Liberal Democrats
Popular vote	6,282	2,618
Percentage	14.2%	5.9%
Swing	New	▼2.2 pp
MP before election
Liz Truss
Conservative
Elected MP
Terry Jermy
Labour

An election took place in the East Anglia constituency of South West Norfolk on 4 July 2024, as part of the 2024 general election. Liz Truss, the shortest-serving British prime minister in history, was standing for re-election as MP. On 2 July, in anticipation of a large Labour victory in the general election, a national poll of voters by Portland Communications had shown that Truss was the Conservative politician the highest percentage of people (28%) wanted to see lose their seat.

Suffering from both a reduction in popular support and from vote splitting with Reform UK candidate Toby McKenzie and independent James Bagge, Truss lost her seat with a 43.7% fall in the Conservative vote share, despite having won 69% of the vote at the previous election; The Spectator labelled the result the "Portillo moment" of the year.

== Background ==
Truss had been the Conservative Member of Parliament (MP) for South West Norfolk since 2010. At the 2019 general election she achieved a majority of 26,195 over her nearest rival, making it the 11th-safest Conservative seat in the country. Truss served as prime minister for only 49 days in 2022; her tenure caused chaos in the financial markets.

Before the election there was speculation that Truss might lose the seat. Though there were a number of major Conservative politicians, including Chancellor of the Exchequer Jeremy Hunt (who subsequently retained his seat) who were considered at risk of losing their seats in 2024, Truss was the only former prime minister standing in the election and it was believed her defeat could be "the ultimate Portillo moment". South West Norfolk had been held by the Conservatives since 1964 and required a 25% swing to the Labour Party for them to lose the seat.

A Survation poll on 22 June predicted that every Conservative in the Norfolk area would lose their seat.

== Candidates ==
Liz Truss, a Conservative, had been the sitting MP for the constituency since 2010, having won the seat in the general election. She had become UK prime minister for a short period and was criticised by her opponents in this election for her lack of presence in her constituency.

Independent candidate James Bagge had been part of the local Conservative Party that had tried to stop Truss from being preselected in 2009 as the party's candidate for the seat. A former High Sheriff of Norfolk, Bagge was unhappy with the lack of attention Truss had given to the constituency and had resigned as Deputy lieutenant of Norfolk in January 2024 in preparation to stand against her in the forthcoming election. His supporters were colloquially known as the "Turnip Taliban".

Terry Jermy, the Labour Party nominee, was a member of Thetford Town Council, a councillor for Thetford on Breckland District Council and Norfolk County Council, and a former Mayor of Thetford.

Green Party nominee Pallavi Devulapalli was a councillor on King's Lynn and West Norfolk Borough Council, a GP and her party's national spokesperson on health.

Toby McKenzie, the nominee for Reform UK, was a former teacher.

Liberal Democrat nominee Josie Ratcliffe was a councillor for Downham East on King's Lynn and West Norfolk Borough Council and had stood for her party in the same constituency for the 2019 general election.

== Campaign ==
When the election was announced, Truss listed her local achievements in a Facebook post, including securing £20 million of regeneration funding for the town of Thetford. She went to the constituency to campaign in person and, as a former prime minister, was accompanied by close protection officers. She visited a number of towns and villages in the constituency, also attending a D-Day commemoration event in Pickenham, but she avoided the one hustings event that took place.

The other candidates treated the election as if it were a referendum about Truss's record. They argued that Truss had spent little time on constituency issues and had been a poor constituency MP. A spokesperson for Truss pointed out she held constituency surgeries, but did not advertise them for security reasons.

Jermy received little support from the national Labour Party campaign and had to raise £15,000 for his local campaign through crowdfunding.

Bagge launched his campaign, as a "moderate" independent candidate, on the same date in April 2024 that Truss launched her latest book Ten Years to Save the West. He received endorsements from former Conservative ministers David Gauke and Rory Stewart. Former minister Dominic Grieve campaigned in the constituency with him.

McKenzie could only campaign for Reform at the weekends because he had a full-time job. He said he was realistically hoping to raise the profile of Reform in the constituency.

On 30 June the Financial Times put Jermy ahead of Truss by a 1.7% margin, with 32.1% of the vote. Many voters were unenthusiastic or undecided. Though Bagge was unlikely to win the seat as an independent, it was felt that the traditional Conservative vote might be split, allowing the Labour candidate to win.

== Results ==
General election 2024: South West Norfolk
Party	Candidate	Votes	%	±%
Labour	Terry Jermy	11,847	26.7	+8.4
Conservative	Liz Truss	11,217	25.3	–43.4
Reform	Toby McKenzie	9,958	22.4	New
Independent	James Bagge	6,282	14.2	New
Liberal Democrats	Josie Ratcliffe	2,618	5.9	−2.4
Green	Pallavi Devulapalli	1,838	4.1	+1.1
Monster Raving Loony	Earl Elvis of East Anglia	338	0.8	−0.9
Heritage	Gary Conway	160	0.4	New
Communist	Lorraine Douglas	77	0.2	New
Majority		630	1.4	
Turnout		44,335	59.3	–6.3
Labour gain from Conservative		Swing	+25.8	

South West Norfolk was the final result to be declared in Norfolk. Truss arrived at the count on Friday morning with only seconds to spare, receiving as she did so a slow hand-clap from the people assembled in the sports hall where the count was announced. She lost the seat to Labour by 630 votes and did not give a concession speech, though she gave a short interview to the BBC reporter Ros Atkins before she left. The Spectator magazine labelled the result the "Portillo moment" of the year. Truss became the first former UK prime minister to lose their seat in an election since 1935, when Ramsay MacDonald lost his seat in Seaham.

The result returned the lowest vote share nationally in the election for a successful candidate at 26.7%, with a margin of 630 votes between the Labour and Conservative candidates.

== Previous result ==
General election 2019: South West Norfolk
Party	Candidate	Votes	%	±%
Conservative	Liz Truss	35,507	69.0	+6.2
Labour	Emily Blake	9,312	18.1	−9.7
Liberal Democrats	Josie Ratcliffe	4,166	8.1	+3.6
Green	Pallavi Devulapalli	1,645	3.2	N/A
Monster Raving Loony	Earl Elvis of Outwell	836	1.6	N/A
Majority		26,195	50.9	+15.9
Turnout		51,466	65.6	−1.7
Conservative hold		Swing	+8.0	
