= Michael Stone (criminal) =

British convicted murderer (born 1960)

- Born: Michael John Goodban; 7 June 1960 (age 66); Royal Tunbridge Wells, Kent, England
- Known for: The Chillenden Murders
- Criminal charges: Murder; Attempted murder
- Penalty: Life imprisonment

Details
- Victims: Lin Russell (murder); Megan Russell (murder); Josie Russell (attempted murder)
- Date: 9 July 1996
- Date apprehended: July 1997

Michael Stone (born Michael John Goodban, 7 June 1960) was convicted of the 1996 murders of Lin and Megan Russell and the attempted murder of Josie Russell. He was sentenced to three life sentences with a tariff of 25 years for the Russell killings.

Stone maintains his innocence and continues to contest his conviction. His legal team argues that the serial killer Levi Bellfield could possibly be the true perpetrator of the attack. In February 2022, Stone's solicitor said that Bellfield had confessed to the murder of both Lin and Megan, although the truthfulness of the confession remained in doubt and Bellfield later claimed that he had confessed for a cash payment. In July 2023 the Criminal Cases Review Commission declined to refer Stone's case to the Court of Appeal, saying that it had "identified no credible new evidence or information". This decision was under review as of October 2023.

== Early life ==
Stone was born as Michael John Goodban in Royal Tunbridge Wells, Kent on 7 June 1960, one of five children. Although the name of his father was registered, and therefore given on his birth certificate, as "Ivor Goodban", there was uncertainty over the true identity of his father and Stone regarded a different partner of his mother, Peter Stone, as having been his father. Both men denied that he was their son. Stone had a turbulent childhood, suffering domestic violence in his family home before he was placed in a care home, where he was abused. As a boy, he had also been beaten with a hammer, and witnessed his mother's former partner attack another man with a meat cleaver in his home. He was known to be prone to uncontrolled outbursts and aggressive mood swings. From the age of nine, he began using drugs and committing crimes.

Stone's police record dates back to 1972 at the age of 12 and continued into adulthood. On leaving the care system, Stone began using heroin, and soon developed a £1,500 a week heroin addiction. He served three prison sentences in the 1980s and 1990s for robbery, burglary, grievous bodily harm and assault occasioning actual bodily harm. He was known to carry weapons, including knives and guns, and would also attack victims with ammonia squirted from a Jif lemon bottle. He became a figure in the criminal underworld of the Medway towns of Kent.

Stone was sentenced to two years' imprisonment in 1981 for attacking a man with a hammer during a robbery. He then received a four-and-a-half year sentence for stabbing a friend while he slept in 1983, an attack that penetrated the friend's lung and nearly killed him, and he tried to wound a police officer in the eye after this arrest. When he was sentenced for this crime, the sentencing judge remarked that Stone's violent nature could lead to him killing someone in the future. He was then sentenced to 10 years' imprisonment for two armed robberies in Maidstone and Brighton respectively during the same week in 1986. The first robbery was at Maidstone's Hazlitt Theatre, and the second was at the Leeds Permanent Building Society branch in Brighton, where he stole £577. Throughout his criminal career, Stone would steal from garden sheds, taking anything he could sell, and would mug people at cash dispensers, in part to fund his heroin addiction. In prison, he attacked various prison officers.

Stone was known to have been violent towards his partners. His former girlfriend, Rachel Marcroft, recounted that he had once beaten her so badly that she went to the police, who took photos of her injuries as evidence, although the charges were later dropped as she refused to give evidence against him. She had received two black eyes, a swollen mouth and heavy bruising from where he had held her down, injuries which the police later said bore a striking resemblance to those on the bodies of the Russells, whom he was later convicted of murdering. Marcroft said that the way the Russells were tied up was similar to how she was tied up by Stone. She said that whenever he was violent towards her, Stone would not afterwards remember what he had done.

Stone was released from prison in 1993. Prior to the murders, he had received support for his drug addiction and mental health problems and was under the supervision of the National Probation Service. He had a history of severe mental illness. Stone had been sectioned to a mental hospital in Hull in 1994, and was diagnosed with personality disorder and paranoid psychosis. His conditions were controlled by regular injections of medication, but his treatment was affected by his overuse of heroin. The hospital at which he was detained had to pass him into the care of another health authority as they found him "too dangerous". It was then that he was passed into the care of West Kent health authority.

=== Suspect in 1976 murder ===
Police suspect Stone of having killed Francis Jegou, who was found stabbed to death in a park in Maidstone in 1976. Jegou was a 65-year-old Guernsey man who was a former special constable. The motive for the murder appeared to be robbery, since Jegou always carried around large amounts of cash yet only had £3 on him when his body was discovered. He died from multiple stab wounds to the stomach and of head injuries inflicted by being kicked repeatedly. His body was discovered near Maidstone East railway station, very close to the Stone family home at the time, and very close to the probation hostel Stone was then staying in. Stone allegedly later told a psychiatrist that he was responsible for the robbery and murder of Jegou.

Stone was a suspect and was questioned about the crime in the aftermath, and he was again questioned about the murder immediately before being charged with the Russell killings in 1997. At the time of Jegou's murder, police announced that they wanted to speak to four youths who they thought could have seen Jegou or his murderer. Stone was 16 at the time, and a prolific offender. Stone has been known to attack policemen. In 1983 he stabbed a man then attacked and almost blinded an officer, for which he received a four-and-a-half-year sentence.

Stone's sister Barbara, who has always protested her brother's innocence of the Russell murders, said in 1998 that she believed he had indeed killed Jegou, stating: "I don't think he killed Lin and Megan Russell. But I do think he did that murder when he was younger." Explaining, she commented: "When I was about 14 Mick came up to me with a knife in a sheath. He said I was to hide it for him and I buried it. At the time I was just a kid and did what my big brother told me. Years later he said he knew something about the murder. I knew he was up to no good. The killing was his style – it was done by two or more people and Mick never acted alone. It would have been done to get money and, again, that's something he'd have done."

=== Links to other deaths ===
Stone is known to have accidentally killed his partner by injecting him with too much heroin, causing an overdose. Police also questioned him about the death of a friend who fell under a London Tube train as he stood next to Stone. Stone later boasted of pushing the man underneath the train. He was also initially questioned regarding the murder of 64-year-old Mary Town, who was found dead in a disused warehouse in Maidstone in 1977, although another man was later convicted of the murder.

== Russell murders ==
On 9 July 1996, in a country lane in Chillenden, Kent, England, Lin Russell, aged 45, her two daughters, six-year-old Megan and nine-year-old Josie and their dog Lucy, were tied up and savagely beaten with a hammer while walking home from a swimming gala. Lin, Megan and their dog Lucy were killed during the frenzied 15-minute attack, but Josie survived and made a recovery. The trio had walked past a parked car on the lane before a man got out wielding a claw hammer and then demanded money. Lin said that they didn't have any and offered to go home and get some, but the man refused before tying them up and bludgeoning them. Lin urged Josie to run home and get help but the attacker caught her, blindfolded her with strips of her swimming towel and tied her to a tree before hitting her until she passed out. Lin had also been blindfolded. After attacking the Russells, the attacker then drove off in his car.

In the week after the murders, Stone and an accomplice were known to have carried out a robbery in Gillingham.

Josie's recovery and the way she and her father, Shaun Russell, coped with the aftermath of the tragedy were the subject of a BBC documentary.

== Conviction for Russell murders ==
=== Arrest ===
In July 1997, police arrested 37-year-old Michael Stone for the crimes after tip-offs resulting from a reconstruction on the Crimewatch television programme. A psychiatrist called to report his suspicions of Stone, and another two nursing staff called in also naming Stone. These medical workers, who had worked with Stone before the attacks, reported that by 4 July, five days before the murders, Stone was becoming increasingly enraged and had aggressively threatened to kill people and their families. The psychiatrist further recalled that Stone had threatened his probation officer with a hammer. The psychiatrist also told police that the threats were so aggressive that they had made him fear for his own safety and for the safety of other employees, and that the fantasies related by Stone seemed to tally with the nature of the attacks on the Russells.

Stone had told a psychiatric nurse that he dreamt about torturing people and that he fantasised about killing children and running about in woods. He further added that he felt like killing children while walking in woods and that when he passed by children he felt like killing them, and also claimed to have attacked people with hammers. He had also said that he was angry at the world and was going to do "something bad". Stone had also apparently begged to be admitted as an in-patient to a psychiatric unit at the time, but he was refused as he was seen as "too dangerous". In his outbursts to medical staff, Stone had asserted his own dangerousness, saying he was too violent to be held in prison and would need to be admitted to Broadmoor Hospital, with notions of achieving "fame and glory" for his crimes. It was known that Stone had also tried to admit himself to a psychiatric ward the day after the killings. The psychiatrist told police that Stone fitted the E-fit and the police description of the murderer.

A friend also rang police after the reconstruction to say he believed Stone looked like the E-fit shown on the programme and reported that he had recently been acting strangely. Another friend said he had seen him wearing blood-soaked clothes on the day of the murders, although Stone said that this was because he had been in a fight.

Shortly before his arrest for the murders in 1997, Stone had threatened to kill his sister and one of her children, and smashed up her car. Stone attempted suicide at least twice while on remand.

=== Evidence ===
Stone had no alibi for the day of the murders, saying he could not remember where he was as he had been taking so many drugs and because more than a year had passed. He said that he could recall the week before the murders and the day following them, but not what he was doing on the day itself. He continued to maintain that he could not remember where he was on 9 July during both his trials. A receipt shows that he was definitely at a Cash Converters in Chatham at 12.21 pm on the day, putting him 40 miles away, although he could have travelled to Chillenden by the time of the murders which occurred at approximately 4.30 pm. A detective from the case later stated that it was possible that, in a haze of drugs, Stone could have forgotten carrying out the attack at all.

Stone told police he had never heard of Chillenden, but friends testified that he knew the Chillenden area "like the back of his hand". Stone had spent a short time at the Eastry children's home 2 miles (3.2 km) from the murder scene as a child of eight or nine. A reason for Stone being in woods near Chillenden on the day of the murder could not be established as Stone lived 30 miles (48 km) away in Gillingham. Police said that, as Stone financed his drug habit by burgling homes, stealing lawnmowers, mobile generators and other items that he hoped to sell on, he could have been in Chillenden in order to steal something.

Police discovered that a lawnmower had been stolen from a cottage in Chillenden on the same day of the murders, only 200–400 yards (180–370 m) away from the scene of the attacks, and believed that Stone was responsible for this theft. He was known to have tried to sell a lawnmower to a relative shortly after the murders. It was also speculated that Stone could have decided to rob Lin Russell in a desperate need for money to buy heroin. Stone was known to have always carried a hammer in his car.

A key witness in the case was a woman driving on the adjacent road, who said she had seen a man hurriedly emerging out of the junction by the murder site in a beige car. She said she "could tell he was angry" and that he kept looking back at her in his wing mirrors. It was this woman who later helped police create the E-fit of the suspected killer. Another witness recounted driving past a man acting strangely nearby, not in a vehicle but holding a claw hammer in his hand and looking agitated (a claw hammer was found to have been the weapon used in the attacks). A third witness also testified seeing a beige car parked by bushes nearby, a Ford Escort, and said that when he took his dog for a walk to the same spot half an hour later he found a string bag with the strips of towel in it that had been used to restrain the Russells, and which were smeared with their blood. Curiously, Stone owned a white Toyota Tercel at the time of the crime, and there are no records showing Stone as the owner of a beige car like that which various witnesses had reported seeing. However, some of his friends claimed that Stone did once drive a beige car that matched the one seen near the scene. Despite this, the only witness who is known to have definitely seen the attacker, surviving victim Josie Russell, maintained that the attacker had been in a red car, and Stone himself said that he had owned a red car.

At the crime scene, a fingerprint impressed in blood was found on the lid of Josie's lunchbox (which was inside a zipped-up bag) and hairs were found that did not belong to any of the victims. A black bootlace that was bloodstained had been used in the attack. Stone was known to use a bootlace as a tourniquet to raise the veins in his arms when injecting drugs. These items were scientifically tested using the techniques then available, and no link was found to Stone. The bloodstained strips of towel and string bag were also scientifically examined, and no link was found on these to Stone either. The fingerprint on the lunchbox was conclusively found not to belong to Stone as it did not share his distinctive fingerprint pattern, although it was determined that it could have been Lin's fingerprint, yet this scenario would have meant that the victim would have had to have left the fingerprint on the lunchbox before the attacker zipped-up the lunchbox bag again as the box was found zipped-up and closed when the police arrived at the scene. A full DNA profile was compiled from the hairs found at the scene by the police, but no match was made with any known person. It is not known for certain whether the hairs belonged to the attacker, as they could have got onto the girls' clothing when they were at the swimming gala.

A hammer was found near the scene of the murders, although it could not be conclusively determined whether it had been the hammer used in the attack.

The day after the attack, friends noticed that Stone's clothing was bloodstained and that he refused to enter their home as usual. They also noticed bloodstains on his toolbox in his car, and on a blue sweatshirt. Stone claimed this was as a result of him being in a fight, although no marks on Stone were seen. Shortly after this, friends alleged that Stone removed the bloodstained items from his car and changed his clothes. He later told police that he then burned all his clothes.

=== First trial ===
Stone pleaded not guilty at his original trial in 1998, but his conviction was primarily based on the testimony from a witness, Damian Daley, who claimed that Stone had confessed to him while in prison during a conversation through a heating pipe at the back of their cells. Daley was himself subsequently found guilty of murder in 2014. Stone was known to have attempted suicide at least twice in prison around the time the confession was supposed to have taken place. Another two prisoners, Mark Jennings and Barry Thompson, also testified at the trial that Stone had suggested to them an involvement in the crimes. The court also heard that Stone was unable to present any of the clothes he was wearing at the time for analysis, as he said he had burned them because he was "too fat".

As a result, the conviction hinged upon the three confessions Stone was alleged to have made, because there was no forensic evidence linking Stone to the crime. The confessions did not contain any material that had not been previously reported by the national press, but on the contrary, all the details found in the confession had been published in the national press on the day of the alleged confession, apart from the reference to a shoelace, which had previously been publicised. The DNA found on a black bootlace which had been used in the crime and dropped by the perpetrator moreover did not correspond to Stone's profile. The case was otherwise simply circumstantial. The jury took nearly 15 hours over two days to find Stone guilty by a 10–2 majority verdict.

Some evidence against Stone was not able to be presented in court, such as his long record of violent crime and of severe mental illness. The statements from the psychiatrist and nurses who had named Stone as a suspect after the Crimewatch reconstruction, in which they told of Stone's threats to kill and of his irrational and dangerous behaviour only days before the murders, were also not heard by the jury. After the arrest of Stone, surviving victim Josie Russell had said that she recognised him from newspaper pictures in articles covering the story, but evidence admissibility laws prevented this from being heard in court. Police were also unable to present their suspicions that Stone was responsible for the theft of a lawnmower yards from the murder site on the day of the murder.

=== Successful appeal, second guilty verdict ===
The Court of Appeal ordered a retrial in February 2001, after two out of the three prisoners had their evidence discredited. Within 24 hours of the first trial one of the prisoners who gave key evidence, Barry Thompson, admitted he had lied about Stone confessing to him and retracted his evidence. It was also found that a second prisoner who gave evidence, Mark Jennings, had been paid £5,000 by The Sun newspaper and promised a further £10,000 before he gave his evidence, and so his statement was deemed unreliable.

However, Stone was convicted a second time in 2001, this time on the sole evidence of the confession allegedly made to Damien Daley (he himself was subsequently convicted of murder) the jury taking less time than in the first trial to find him guilty. The alleged confession merely repeated facts that had been published in the national newspapers on the day it was made on 23/9/97. Any person who had therefore read the newspapers could have given a similar account of the crime: I tied them up with wet towels. Their dog barked loudly. One of them tried to run away. He mentioned something about shorts, shoes or shoelaces. (Josie's evidence was that their dog did not bark). As part of the trial, the jury visited the prison cells where Stone's confession to Daley was alleged to have taken place, and listened as an extract from a Harry Potter novel was read near the gap around the pipe joining the two cells to determine whether the confession was plausible.

=== Later court decisions ===
Stone was granted leave to appeal again in 2004, with his lawyers claiming Daley's testimony was unreliable. However, this second appeal was rejected in 2005, with the judge saying that he was "unpersuaded" by evidence which Stone's lawyers said undermined Daley's evidence. On 21 December 2006, a High Court judge decided that Stone should spend at least 25 years in prison before being considered for parole, meaning he is likely to remain in prison until at least 2023 and the age of 63. The judge had said that imposing a whole-life order was appropriate, but that 25 years was the longest tariff he was "legally entitled" to impose.

== Mental health inquiry ==
Following Stone's conviction, an inquiry was held into the care he received for his drug addiction and mental health problems. Stone had threatened to kill his probation officer, his family, and criminal justice staff in an "aggressive outburst" with a psychiatric nurse five days before the murders of Lin and Megan Russell. The inquiry, led by Sir Robert Francis QC, found failings in his care, but said that Stone's case was "emphatically not a case of a man with a dangerous personality disorder being generally ignored by agencies or left at large". Shaun Russell disagreed with the report's conclusion that the murders could not have been prevented.

In response to Stone's conviction, Alan Milburn (then Health Secretary) proposed a reform of the Mental Health Act 1983. The White Paper proposal sought to reform the 1983 MHA's "treatability test", which stated that only patients whose mental disorders were considered treatable could be detained. Individuals diagnosed as psychopathic or with anti-social personality disorder, such as Stone, could not be detained because these conditions were not considered treatable. The proposed changes were intended to allow the government to detain individuals who had not committed a crime. The proposed measures were described as "draconian" by Nacro and a number of changes were made before the bill was finally passed as the Mental Health Act 2007.

== Claim of innocence ==
Stone continues to argue that his conviction is a miscarriage of justice on the grounds that the evidence against him came from another prisoner, who was described as a "career criminal" who the Crown acknowledged "would lie when it suited him". Stone's sister, who originally thought Stone could indeed be guilty of the crime, said in 1998 that she had changed her mind and been persuaded that her brother was not guilty. However, she said that she suspected her brother had killed before.

In 2010, the Criminal Cases Review Commission (CCRC) announced that it would not refer the case back to the Court of Appeal because it had found no new evidence to justify making a referral. As part of its investigations, the CCRC had carried out a number of forensic tests on the materials found at the crime scene at the request of Stone's legal team.

Subsequently, Stone's legal team applied in 2011 for a judicial review, seeking court orders which would force the CCRC to reconsider their decision. As part of this, Stone's team cited the dismissal of the testimony of a new witness, prisoner Alan King, who had come forward to say that the prisoner Stone allegedly confessed to was lying. The Court of Appeal found that the CCRC was entitled not to find the new witness's evidence credible based on the length of time it had taken the witness to come forward.

Stone's legal team had asked the CCRC to re-examine a 1 metre (3 ft 3 in) long boot lace which had been used in the attacks and had been dropped at the scene of the crime by the murderer. With the advance of DNA testing, Stone's team requested that the lace be examined using more modern forensic techniques to see if the attacker's DNA could now be found on it. However, the police said the lace could not be located.

Stone's legal team have argued that Levi Bellfield could be responsible for the killings. However, Bellfield's partner at the time, Johanna Collings, has insisted that she was with him on the day of the murders as it was her birthday. She had told investigators this, and it was an alibi that detectives found credible. Collings had helped detectives convict Bellfield for his previous murders, such as in the Milly Dowler murder, giving evidence that he knew well the area where her body was left. In regards to the Russell murders, however, she commented in a BBC documentary in 2017:

My daughter was born in '96 and that was the day of my birthday. He [Bellfield] never left my side, all day and all night, so there's absolutely no way he could have got from Twickenham, where I lived, or Windsor, where I kept my horses, to Kent, done what they say he did, and got back without me not knowing he was there. I can hand on my heart, I hate to say it, but I can say hand on my heart he didn't do it.

In 2013, criminologist David Wilson investigated the possibility that Levi Bellfield could be responsible for the murders in an episode of his Killers Behind Bars: The Untold Story series. He stated that he doubted the strength of Stone's conviction, in particular highlighting that "cell confessions" are notoriously unreliable, and conveyed his surprise that this was the basis for Stone's conviction. He also cited a letter from the prisoner Alan King (whose claims had previously been cited by Stone's legal team in his 2010 appeal and which had been deemed discredited) which said that Damien Daley had admitted to him that Stone had never confessed to him, and that he had only claimed this as he imagined it might win him an earlier release. Wilson also concluded in the programme that it was unlikely that Bellfield was responsible for the murders, citing a number of differences in the way the crimes were carried out from Bellfield's previous murders, particularly how Bellfield's known crimes occurred in urban London while the murders of the Russells occurred in rural Kent.

In May and June 2017, the case was scrutinised in a two-part BBC Two programme, The Chillenden Murders, in which a team of independent experts re-examined the evidence, and suggested that the wrong man might have been convicted. Two of the legal experts who took part in the programme— defence barrister Stephen Kamlish QC and legal expert Sheryl Nwosu— stated that there are significant doubts regarding the conviction and are now working on Stone's behalf to have the case re-examined with the aim of launching a third appeal against the conviction.

On 29 November 2017, BBC Wales reported that Levi Bellfield had allegedly confessed to the murders to a fellow prisoner, giving details that "would only be known by the killer". Bellfield denied that he committed the murders and denied making the confession.

In May 2021, it came to light that Kent Police had relocated the lace found at the scene of the attacks, which had been mislaid, and that Stone's defence team had asked for it to be analysed for DNA traces, hoping it could lead to the overturning of his conviction.

In February 2022 Stone's solicitor, Paul Bacon, stated that Bellfield had admitted the murders, in a statement containing details which, Bacon suggested, would be known only to the actual killer. However, a member of Stone's legal team stated that there was nothing in Bellfield's statement which was not already in the public domain, suggesting he could have fabricated it using known evidence. The detective responsible for investigating Bellfield's known crimes also stated to the press: "Knowing Bellfield as I do, this could be him playing mind games". The Metropolitan Police previously investigated allegations that Bellfield was involved in the Russell murders and found no evidence to support the suggestion.

In April 2023, Bellfield's lawyer claimed that Bellfield had admitted to the murders during a conversation with a prison psychologist. Stone's lawyer declared that a signed confession by Bellfield had been handed over to the CCRC. However, Bellfield later retracted the confessions, and it was reported that he had then sent a letter to Kent Police explaining that he had only confessed for a £5,000 cash payment. Bellfield had previously stated in 2017 that he had been repeatedly offered money by Stone's defence team to confess to the killings. The senior investigating officer on the Bellfield case Colin Sutton commented: "My view is that Bellfield knows he is in prison forever, that he has somehow joined up with Stone and offered to lie on his behalf for payment". Bellfield's 2023 letter claiming he had been offered £5,000 to confess was also passed to the CCRC. Ultimately, in July 2023 the CCRC announced that Stone's case would not be referred to the Court of Appeal as there was "no real possibility" that the court would overturn his conviction. It explained that it had "identified no credible new evidence or information" and "considered whether there are any further proportionate lines of inquiry with the prospect of yielding new evidence capable of making a difference to the safety of Mr Stone's conviction", but "has not identified any".

In October 2023, the CCRC announced that it was conducting a fresh review of Stone's case. The decision followed a statement by Stone's legal team that they would seek judicial review of the previous decision not to refer the case. The CCRC commented: "While we can't comment on the specifics of an investigation, it is not unusual for different reviews to focus on different arguments or evidence". It added that: "the CCRC's previous reviews found no credible evidence or argument that raised a real possibility of the convictions being quashed – these conclusions are not affected by the new review". As part of the review, the CCRC announced in November that it was performing new forensic testing on some of the evidence in the Russell murders using a technique that had not been discovered at the time of Stone's conviction.

In 2026, forensic scientist Angela Gallop was commissioned by Stone's legal team to perform a forensic review of the evidence in the Russell murders. According to Gallop, she discovered scrapings under the fingernails on Lin Russell's left hand which had not been tested during the initial investigation. In response to the finding, the CCRC stated its review was still ongoing.

In July 2026, Stone's legal team announced that forensic testing had found two distinct male DNA profiles on several items recovered from the crime scene. Some of the DNA was identified as belonging to Shaun Russell while the second profile remained unidentified. The CCRC took a DNA sample from Stone on July 9, exactly thirty years after the murders occurred. The CCRC also announced that it intended to take a sample from Levi Bellfield to determine whether he could have committed the crime, which lawyers for Bellfield predicted he would cooperate with.
