= 2026 Norfolk Police and Crime Commissioner by-election =

Election held in the United Kingdom in July 2026

- 16 July 2026

Police and Crime Commissioner
- Turnout: 17.1% (▼4.3 pp)
	First party	Second party	Third party
Candidate	Colin Sutton	Matthew Taylor	Martin Schmierer
Party	Reform	Conservative	Green
Popular vote	32,647	18,348	16,907
Percentage	26.7%	15.0%	13.8%
Swing	▲26.7 pp	▼18.9 pp	▼2.0 pp
	Fourth party	Fifth party	Sixth party
Candidate	Marcus Pearcey	Beth Jones	Mark Buckton
Party	Independent	Labour	Restore
Popular vote	16,402	14,192	13,319
Percentage	13.4%	11.6%	10.9%
Swing	▲13.4 pp	▼23.6 pp	▲10.9 pp
	Seventh party
Candidate	Chris Brown
Party	Liberal Democrats
Popular vote	10,499
Percentage	8.6%
Swing	▼6.5 pp
- Results by local authority
Police and Crime Commissioner before election
Sarah Taylor
Independent (Note: Elected as Labour, resigned from the party in November 2025 in protest of the government's abolition of PCCs)
Elected Police and Crime Commissioner
Colin Sutton
Reform UK

The 2026 Norfolk Police and Crime Commissioner by-election for the position of Norfolk Police and Crime Commissioner in the Norfolk Constabulary area of the United Kingdom was held on 16 July 2026. The Reform UK candidate, Colin Sutton won this seat by a majority of 14,299, on a turnout of 17%, gaining the seat from Labour, which fell to fifth position.

== Background ==
Incumbent Sarah Taylor suddenly resigned in June 2026. The by-election reportedly cost £2 million. The Green MP for Waveney Valley, Adrian Ramsay, called for the by-election to be scrapped. The elected member was expected to serve as police and crime commissioner until 2028, when the position will be abolished with the formation of the Norfolk and Suffolk Combined County Authority.

== Candidates ==
Seven candidates applied to stand:

- Conservative Party: Matthew Taylor, district and county councillor.
- Green Party of England and Wales: Martin Schmierer, former Lord Mayor of Norwich.
- Labour Party: Beth Jones, member of Norwich City Council.
- Liberal Democrats: Chris Brown, member of South Norfolk District Council.
- Independent: Marcus Pearcey, businessman.
- Reform UK: Colin Sutton, former Metropolitan Police detective.
- Restore Britain: Mark Buckton, former army officer.

== Campaign ==
Issues raised in the campaign included cannabis decriminalisation, violence against women and rural crime.

== Results ==
The votes were counted and the result declared on 17 July 2026.

2026 Norfolk Police and Crime Commissioner by-election
Party	Candidate	Votes	%	±%
Reform	Colin Sutton	32,647	26.7	New
Conservative	Matthew Patrick Taylor	18,343	15.0	−18.9
Green	Martin Kenneth Albert Schmierer	16,907	13.8	−2.0
Independent	Marcus Howard Pearcey	16,402	13.4	New
Labour	Beth Jones	14,192	11.6	−23.6
Restore	Mark Rhoades Buckton	13,319	10.9	New
Liberal Democrats	Christopher John Brown	10,499	8.6	−6.5
Majority		14,299	11.7	+10.4
Turnout		122,314	17.1	−4.3
Rejected ballots		429	0.3	
Total votes		122,738	17.1	
Registered electors		716,224		
Reform gain from Labour		Swing	+25.2	

=== Results by authority ===
District	Total votes	Reform UK		Conservative		Green		Independent (Pearcey)		Labour		Restore Britain		Lib Dem	
District	Total votes	#	%	#	%	#	%	#	%	#	%	#	%	#	%
Breckland	15,944	6,245	39.3	2,652	16.7	1,113	7.0	1,588	10.0	1,642	10.3	1,660	10.4	1,004	6.3
Broadland	23,175	5,466	23.6	3,374	14.6	2,549	11.0	6,157	26.6	2,387	10.3	1,436	6.2	1,701	7.3
Great Yarmouth	11,352	2,254	19.9	1,219	10.7	676	6.0	779	6.9	1,165	10.3	4,880	43.0	345	3.0
King's Lynn & West Norfolk	15,543	5,911	38.2	3,124	20.2	1,124	7.3	974	6.3	1,624	10.5	1,630	10.5	1,103	7.1
North Norfolk	15,455	4,500	29.2	3,162	20.5	1,229	8.0	1,605	10.4	976	6.3	1,071	7.0	2,864	18.6
Norwich	20,507	2,933	14.2	1,566	7.6	7,200	34.8	2,432	11.7	4,052	19.6	1,146	5.5	1,370	6.6
South Norfolk	20,517	5,338	26.0	3,251	15.8	3,016	14.7	2,867	14.0	2,346	11.4	1,496	7.3	2,112	10.3
Total	122,739	32,647	26.7%	18,348	15.0%	16,907	13.8%	16,402	13.4%	14,192	11.6%	13,319	10.9%	10,499	8.6%

== Previous result ==
2024 Norfolk police and crime commissioner election
Party	Candidate	Votes	%	±%
Labour Co-op	Sarah Taylor	52,445	35.2	+13.1
Conservative	Giles Orpen-Smellie	50,567	33.9	−11.2
Green	Martin Schmierer	23,628	15.8	+5.6
Liberal Democrats	John Crofts	22,525	15.1	+1.4
Turnout		149,165		
Labour Co-op gain from Conservative		Swing		

== See also ==
- 2026 Greater Manchester mayoral by-election
- 2026 Clacton by-election
