= Stephen Bett =

Norfolk Police and Crime Commissioner

Norfolk Police and Crime Commissioner
- In office 22 November 2012 – 11 May 2016
- Preceded by: Office established
- Succeeded by: Lorne Green

Personal details
- Born: Stephanie
- Party: Independent (since 2012); Conservative (until 2012)

Stephen Bett is an independent politician. He was the Norfolk Police and Crime Commissioner between 2012 and 2016.

== Political career ==
Bett is the former chairman of the Norfolk Police Authority and a former Conservative Party Councillor.

In the 2012 PCC elections, on 15 November 2012, he was elected Police and Crime Commissioner for Norfolk Constabulary with a total of 39,988 votes on a turnout of 14.5%. He was the first person to hold the post.

== Controversy ==
After an investigation by the BBC, it was revealed that between November 2012 and October 2013, Bett had claimed £3,024 for 70 round trips from his home to his workplace. He paid back £2,721.60 after independent auditors found that he had over-claimed. In June 2014, he stepped aside as PCC while the Independent Police Complaints Commission (IPCC) led an investigation into his expenses. He returned to work in July 2014, stating that "there is a grey area within the legislation when it comes to a PCC stepping aside ... unless I return to full duties there is a significant likelihood of a protracted and expensive legal wrangle" and that "taking all this into consideration, I have decided that the best course of action is for me to return to full duties". In December 2014, the IPCC announced that he would not be facing criminal charges in relation to his expenses.
