= Norfolk Police and Crime Commissioner =

Police director in UK county

- Incumbent; Colin Sutton since 17 July 2026
- Police and crime commissioner of Norfolk Police
- Reports to: Norfolk Police and Crime Panel
- Appointer: Electorate of Norfolk
- Term length: Four years
- Constituting instrument: Police Reform and Social Responsibility Act 2011
- Precursor: Norfolk Police Authority
- Inaugural holder: Stephen Bett
- Formation: 22 November 2012
- Salary: £73,300
- Website: www.norfolk-pcc.gov.uk

The Norfolk Police and Crime Commissioner is the police and crime commissioner, an elected official responsible for overseeing Norfolk Constabulary in the English county of Norfolk. The post was created in November 2012, following an election held on 15 November 2012, and replaced the Norfolk Police Authority. The most recent incumbent is Colin Sutton, who was elected for Reform UK.

The post is due to be abolished alongside all other PCCs in 2028.

== List of Norfolk Police and Crime Commissioners ==
Name	Political party	From	To
Stephen Bett	Independent	22 November 2012	11 May 2016
Lorne Green	Conservative	12 May 2016	12 May 2021
Giles Orpen-Smellie	Conservative	13 May 2021	8 May 2024
Sarah Taylor	Labour Co-op	9 May 2024	November 2025
Sarah Taylor	Independent	November 2025	June 2026
Colin Sutton	Reform	17 July 2026	Incumbent

== Election results ==
2026 Norfolk Police and Crime Commissioner by-election
Party	Candidate	Votes	%	±%
Reform	Colin Sutton	32,647	26.7	New
Conservative	Matthew Patrick Taylor	18,343	15.0	−18.9
Green	Martin Kenneth Albert Schmierer	16,907	13.8	−2.0
Independent	Marcus Howard Pearcey	16,402	13.4	New
Labour	Beth Jones	14,192	11.6	−23.6
Restore	Mark Rhoades Buckton	13,319	10.9	New
Liberal Democrats	Christopher John Brown	10,499	8.6	−6.5
Majority		14,299	11.7	+10.4
Turnout		122,314	17.1	−4.3
Rejected ballots		429	0.3	
Total votes		122,738	17.1	
Registered electors		716,224		
Reform gain from Labour		Swing	+25.2	

2024 Norfolk Police and Crime Commissioner election
Party	Candidate	Votes	%	±%
Labour Co-op	Sarah Taylor	52,455	35.2	+13.1
Conservative	Giles Orpen-Smellie	50,567	33.9	−11.2
Green	Martin Schmierer	23,628	15.8	+5.6
Liberal Democrats	John Crofts	22,525	15.1	+1.4

2021 Norfolk Police and Crime Commissioner election
Party	Candidate	1st round		2nd round			1st round votesTransfer votes, 2nd round
Party	Candidate	Total	Of round	Transfers	Total	Of round	1st round votesTransfer votes, 2nd round
Conservative	Giles Orpen-Smellie	103,980	45.08%	16,014	119,994	63.31%	
Labour	Michael Rosen	51,056	22.14%	18,496	69,552	36.69%	
Liberal Democrats	John Crofts	31,666	13.73%				
Green	Martin Schmierer	23,469	10.18%				
Independent	David Moreland	20,473	8.88%				
Turnout		230,644					
Conservative hold							

Norfolk Police and Crime Commissioner election, 2016
Party	Candidate	1st round		2nd round			1st round votesTransfer votes, 2nd round
Party	Candidate	Total	Of round	Transfers	Total	Of round	1st round votesTransfer votes, 2nd round
Conservative	Lorne Green	42,928	27.76%	17,133	60,061		
Labour	Chris Jones	37,141	24.02%	13,146	50,287		
UKIP	David Moreland	27,030	17.48%				
Independent	Stephen Bett	25,527	16.51%				
Liberal Democrats	Jacky Howe	12,838	8.30%				
Green	Martin Schmierer	9,187	5.94%				
Turnout		154,651	23.20%				
Rejected ballots							
Total votes							
Registered electors							
Conservative gain from Independent							

Norfolk Police and Crime Commissioner election, 2012
Party	Candidate	1st round		2nd round			1st round votesTransfer votes, 2nd round
Party	Candidate	Total	Of round	Transfers	Total	Of round	1st round votesTransfer votes, 2nd round
Independent	Stephen Bett	27,842	28.66%	12,146	39,988		
Conservative	Jamie Athill	30,834	31.74%	5,771	36,605		
Labour	Steve Morphew	21,456	22.08%				
UKIP	Matthew Smith	9,633	9.91%				
Liberal Democrats	James Joyce	7,392	7.61%				
Turnout		97,157	14.51%				
Rejected ballots		3,251	3.24%				
Total votes		100,408	15.00				
Registered electors		669,387					
Independent win							
