= 2023 Breckland District Council election =

2023 English local election

- 4 May 2023

All 49 seats to Breckland District Council 25 seats needed for a majority

	First party	Second party	Third party
Leader	Sam Chapman-Allen	Terry Jermy	Roger Atterwill
Party	Conservative	Labour	Independent
Last election	37 seats, 58.3%	6 seats, 21.2%	4 seats, 11.1%
Seats before	36	7	3
Seats won	30	12	5
Seat change	▼7	▲6	▲1
Popular vote	24,550	15,380	8,984
Percentage	44.6%	28.0%	16.3%
Swing	▼13.7%	▲6.8%	▲5.2%
	Fourth party	Fifth party
Party	Green	Liberal Democrats
Last election	2 seats, 7.1%	0 seats, 1.1%
Seats before	2	0
Seats won	1	1
Seat change	▼1	▲1
Popular vote	2,464	3,170
Percentage	4.5%	5.8%
Swing	▼2.6%	▲4.7%
- Winner of each seat at the 2023 Breckland District Council election.
Leader before election
Sam Chapman-Allen
Conservative
Leader after election
Sam Chapman-Allen
Conservative

The 2023 Breckland District Council election took place on 4 May 2023 to elect members of Breckland District Council in England. This was on the same day as other local elections. The boundaries for this election were the same as those used in 2015 and 2019.

== Summary ==
=== Overview ===
Prior to the election, the Conservative Party held the council with a large majority. It had lost several seats in the 2019 election, when Labour, the Green Party and independent candidates all made gains.

In 2023, the Conservative party again lost seats, though maintained a majority on the council with thirty of the 49 available seats. The Labour Party made the largest gains, with six additional seats from the district's largest towns of Thetford and Dereham. One additional independent was elected, the Green Party lost one of the two seats they had gained in 2019 back to the Conservatives, and the Liberal Democrats gained a seat for the first time in over twenty years.

=== Nominations ===
As in previous elections, the number of candidates selected by each party in 2023 varied considerably. In the 2023 election cycle, considerably more non-Conservative candidates registered to stand than in other recent elections. The Conservative Party nominated 43 candidates, down from 47 at the previous election: the reduction was mostly in already opposition-held wards, for example not nominating candidates in the Labour-held wards of Thetford Burrell and Thetford Priory.

Labour nominated 39 candidates, its largest total in some years, and far more independent candidates were nominated, up to 21 from just 8 in 2019. The Liberal Democrats stood six candidates, up from just one in 2019. The Green Party nominated one fewer, down to six, and UKIP stood just one candidate, down from two in 2019. Reform UK was the only new party to stand, nominating two candidates.

=== Election result ===
2023 Breckland District Council election
Party	Candidates	Seats	Gains	Losses	Net gain/loss	Seats %	Votes %	Votes	+/−
Conservative	43	30	1	8	▼7	61.2	44.6	24,550	-13.7
Labour	39	12	6	0	▲6	24.4	28.0	15,380	+6.8
Independent	21	5	1	0	▲1	10.2	16.3	8,984	+5.2
Liberal Democrats	6	1	1	0	▲1	2.0	5.8	3,170	+4.7
Green	6	1	0	1	▼1	2.0	4.5	2,464	-2.6
Reform	2	0	0	0	Steady	0.0	0.6	313	+0.6
UKIP	1	0	0	0	Steady	0.0	0.3	153	–1.0

Note that gains/losses in the above table are taken compared to 2019: that is, excluding changes due to by-elections to allow for a more direct comparison from one election to the next. Changes in the individual ward results below, however, do take by-elections and individual ward histories into account.

== Ward results ==
Breckland District Council published declarations of result for all 27 wards.

=== All Saints & Wayland ===
All Saints & Wayland
Party	Candidate	Votes	%	±%
Conservative	Sarah Elizabeth Suggitt	848	47.2	−17.1
Conservative	Phil Cowen	790	43.9	−19.6
Liberal Democrats	Ian Minto	626	34.8	N/A
Liberal Democrats	Ulrike Corinna Behrendt	504	28.0	N/A
Labour	Ed Szczepanowski	305	17.0	−8.1
Labour	Sue Szczepanowski	301	16.7	−8.3
Majority				
Turnout		1,812	33.05	
Conservative hold		Swing		
Conservative hold		Swing		

The Conservatives defended both seats: both of their candidates were incumbent councillors.

=== Ashill ===
Ashill
Party	Candidate	Votes	%	±%
Conservative	Fabian Royston Eagle	549	69.6	+4.8
Labour	Nicola Joanne Newell	137	17.4	+4.8
Green	Anne Rix	103	13.1	−9.5
Majority				
Turnout		806	35.98	
Conservative hold		Swing		

The Conservatives defended this seat with the incumbent candidate.

=== Attleborough Burgh & Havercroft ===
Attleborough Burgh & Havercroft (2 seats)
Party	Candidate	Votes	%	±%
Conservative	Taila Joan Taylor	613	53.1	+11.3
Independent	Stephen Paul Fraser	431	37.3	N/A
Conservative	Michelle Julie Barron	378	32.8	−5.9
Labour	David Hodgkinson	278	24.1	+1.7
Labour	Tom Stewart	244	21.1	+6.0
Majority				
Turnout		1,158	28.33	
Conservative hold		Swing		
Independent gain from Conservative		Swing		

The Conservatives were defending both seats. Taila Taylor, incumbent, won the seat as an independent in 2019 before switching to the Conservative Party. The other incumbent Conservative, Keith Martin, did not re-stand. Taylor was involved in 2021 in a notable row with the Town Council over bullying allegations which the council accepted were false, leading to a large financial settlement.

=== Attleborough Queens & Besthorpe ===
Attleborough Queens & Besthorpe (3 seats)
Party	Candidate	Votes	%	±%
Conservative	Sam Taylor	685	47.2	−6.9
Conservative	Tristan John Ashby	685	47.2	+2.1
Conservative	Oliver Rhodri	558	38.4	−5.6
Labour	Marcia Solloway-Brown	484	33.3	+3.4
Labour	Paul Smith	421	29.0	N/A
Labour	Vic Peters	410	28.2	N/A
Independent	Debbie Lane	409	28.2	N/A
Reform	Kabeer Kher	142	9.8	N/A
Majority				
Turnout		1,455	23.69	
Conservative hold		Swing		
Conservative hold		Swing		
Conservative hold		Swing		

The Conservatives defended all three seats: Rhodri and Ashby were incumbent councillors.

=== Bedingfeld ===
Bedingfeld
Party	Candidate	Votes	%	±%
Conservative	Ian Sherwood	377	52.6	−21.7
Labour	Doug Jefferson	194	27.1	+1.4
Independent	Ruth Louise Hargreaves	146	20.4	N/A
Majority		183	25.5	
Turnout		728	29.71	
Conservative hold		Swing		

The Conservatives defended this seat. Ian Sherwood was an incumbent 2019 councillor, but for the seat of Swaffham.

=== The Buckenhams and Banham ===
The Buckenhams and Banham
Party	Candidate	Votes	%	±%
Conservative	Stephen Askew	486	59.9	+5.0
Labour	Barry Sumner	326	40.1	+27.4
Majority				
Turnout		821	31.13	
Conservative hold		Swing		

The Conservatives defended this seat with their incumbent councillor.

=== Dereham Neatherd ===
Dereham Neatherd (3 seats)
Party	Candidate	Votes	%	±%
Conservative	Alison Mary Webb	828	46.7	−6.0
Conservative	Linda Helen Monument	744	42.0	−9.9
Conservative	William Robert James Richmond	701	39.5	−7.9
Green	Philip Neil Morton	688	38.8	−14.1
Independent	Zoe Flint	569	32.1	N/A
Labour	Issy Myhill	555	31.3	N/A
Labour	Howard Hawkes	475	26.8	N/A
Majority				
Turnout		1,785	30.02	
Conservative gain from Green		Swing		
Conservative hold		Swing		
Conservative hold		Swing		

Green party councillor Philip Morton got the most votes here in 2019 but failed to defend the seat: Linda Monument and Alison Webb defended the other two seats for the Conservatives, with the third Conservative 2018 candidate, William Richmond, also re-standing and this time being successfully elected.

=== Dereham Toftwood ===
Dereham Toftwood (2 seats)
Party	Candidate	Votes	%	±%
Labour	Kendra Bryony Cogman	572	49.7	+12.7
Labour	Sarah Simpson	555	48.3	+4.5
Conservative	Stuart Richard Green	518	45.0	−5.4
Conservative	Philip James Duigan	512	44.5	−7.3
Majority		37	3.3	
Turnout		1,163	25.62	
Labour gain from Conservative		Swing		
Labour gain from Conservative		Swing		

The Conservatives were the defending party in both seats: Duigan was an incumbent councillor.

=== Dereham Withburga ===
Dereham Withburga (2 seats)
Party	Candidate	Votes	%	±%
Labour	Harry Clarke	665	67.0	+22.1
Labour	Ray O'Callaghan	574	57.8	+20.0
Conservative	Robin Hunter-Clarke	305	30.7	−8.8
Conservative	Judy Rogers	263	26.5	N/A
Majority				
Turnout		1,003	23.17	
Labour hold		Swing		
Labour gain from Conservative		Swing		

In 2019 Labour and the Conservatives each won a seat here. The Labour incumbent, Harry Clarke, re-stood: the Conservative incumbent Kay Grey did not.

=== Forest ===
Forest (2 seats)
Party	Candidate	Votes	%	±%
Conservative	Sam Chapman-Allen	469	66.1	−4.6
Conservative	Robert George Kybird	455	64.1	+3.4
Labour	Viola Ross-Smith	217	30.6	+4.7
Labour	Matthew Stirrup	193	27.2	N/A
Majority				
Turnout		727	29.23	
Conservative hold		Swing		
Conservative hold		Swing		

The Conservative Party defended both seats with incumbent councillors: this is the seat of their council leader, Sam Chapman-Allen.

=== Guiltcross ===
Guiltcross
Party	Candidate	Votes	%	±%
Conservative	Marion Penelope Chapman-Allen	479	53.5	−14.2
Labour	Liz Bernard	416	46.5	+14.2
Majority				
Turnout		909	35.27	
Conservative hold		Swing		

The Conservatives defended this ward with their incumbent councillor.

=== Harling and Heathlands ===
Harling and Heathlands
Party	Candidate	Votes	%	±%
Conservative	William Nunn	498	64.2	−7.3
Labour	Hayley Balster	278	35.8	+7.3
Majority				
Turnout		791	29.50	
Conservative hold		Swing		

The Conservatives defended this ward with their incumbent councillor.

=== Hermitage ===
Hermitage
Party	Candidate	Votes	%	±%
Liberal Democrats	Mitchell Thurbon	316	41.1	N/A
Conservative	Robert Andrew Hambidge	297	38.7	−32.6
Labour	John Peter Barnard	155	20.2	−8.5
Majority				
Turnout		777	34.29	
Liberal Democrats gain from Conservative		Swing		

Robert Hambidge was the incumbent Conservative councillor in the seat. The Conservative elected in 2019, Trevor Carter, resigned in 2021. Hambidge won the resulting by-election with a small majority over the Liberal Democrat candidate, Ian Minto (who ran in All Saints & Wayland ward in this election).

=== Launditch ===
Launditch
Party	Candidate	Votes	%	±%
Conservative	Mark Alexander Kiddle-Morris	378	51.8	−21.7
Liberal Democrats	Matthew Weatherill	213	29.2	N/A
Labour	Paul Siegert	139	19.0	−7.5
Majority				
Turnout		735	35.10	
Conservative hold		Swing		

The Conservatives defended this seat with their incumbent councillor.

=== Lincoln ===
Lincoln (2 seats)
Party	Candidate	Votes	%	±%
Independent	Roger David Atterwill	958	65.0	+15.4
Conservative	Richard William Duffield	607	41.2	−6.0
Labour	Danielle Claire Glavin	421	28.6	N/A
Conservative	Paula Ann Wood	389	26.4	−15.6
Majority				
Turnout		1,482	34.70	
Independent hold		Swing		
Conservative hold		Swing		

This ward is being defended by incumbent independent councillor Roger Atterwill, and incumbent Conservative Richard Duffield. Atterwill was the leader of the Independent Group on the council.

=== Mattishall ===
Mattishall (2 seats)
Party	Candidate	Votes	%	±%
Conservative	Paul Donald Claussen	680	47.1	−5.2
Conservative	Paul Jonathan Plummer	633	43.8	−10.7
Labour	Bob Burrell	620	42.9	+13.2
Green	Ann Bowyer	580	40.1	N/A
Majority				
Turnout		1467	32.48	
Conservative hold		Swing		
Conservative hold		Swing		

Both Conservative councillors are incumbent: Plummer won the seat formerly held by Conservative Ian Martin, who resigned due to ill health, in a 2022 by-election.

=== Nar Valley ===
Nar Valley
Party	Candidate	Votes	%	±%
Conservative	Peter Samuel Wilkinson	455	61.5	−13.1
Labour	Cliff Wilson	285	38.5	+13.1
Majority				
Turnout		748	32.88	
Conservative hold		Swing		

The Conservatives defended this seat with their incumbent councillor.

=== Necton ===
Necton
Party	Candidate	Votes	%	±%
Conservative	Nigel Charles Wilkin	397	50.9	−10.5
Labour	Joe Sisto	383	49.1	+10.5
Majority				
Turnout		786	35.87	
Conservative hold		Swing		

The Conservatives defended this seat with their incumbent councillor.

=== Saham Toney ===
Saham Toney (2 seats)
Party	Candidate	Votes	%	±%
Conservative	Helen Susan Crane	674	61.6	+9.6
Green	Peter Kevin Bate	523	47.8	−4.5
Conservative	David Robert Mullenger Sawyer	407	37.2	−9.6
Majority				
Turnout		1,107	26.45	
Conservative hold		Swing		
Green hold		Swing		

The Green Party gained a seat here in 2019, coming first in the poll. Their candidate in 2023 is new. Helen Crane defends the other seat for the Conservatives.

=== Shipdham-with-Scarning ===
Shipdham-with-Scarning (2 seats)
Party	Candidate	Votes	%	±%
Conservative	Paul Jonathan Hewett	549	43.8	−18.9
Conservative	Lynda Susan Turner	502	40.1	−16.2
Labour	Timothy Philip Kinnaird	438	35.0	−0.4
Labour	Michael Christopher O'Neil	353	28.2	N/A
Green	Geoffrey Gilbert Plank	271	21.6	N/A
Reform	Scott Daynes	171	13.7	N/A
Majority				
Turnout		1,253	28.73	
Conservative hold		Swing		
Conservative hold		Swing		

The Conservatives held both seats with incumbent councillors.

=== Swaffham ===
Swaffham (3 seats)
Party	Candidate	Votes	%	±%
Independent	Judy Anscombe	925	47.5	N/A
Conservative	Jacob Morton	847	43.5	−0.3
Independent	David Sydney Wickerson	838	43.0	−11.9
Conservative	Paul Robert Wiliam Darby	835	42.9	+4.4
Independent	Bob Wade	832	42.7	N/A
Conservative	Leanne Smart	781	40.1	−0.4
Majority				
Turnout		1,978	28.04	
Independent gain from Conservative		Swing		
Conservative hold		Swing		
Independent hold		Swing		

Independent candidate David Wickerson came first here in 2019 and is defending his seat. The other two seats went to Conservative candidates who are not re-standing, though the sole unsuccessful member of the 2019 Conservative slate, Paul Darby, is standing again.

=== Thetford Boudica ===
Thetford Boudica (2 seats)
Party	Candidate	Votes	%	±%
Labour	Stuart David Terry	505	55.8	+9.3
Labour	Terry Land	477	52.7	N/A
Conservative	Barbara Joyce Tullett	324	35.8	−18.3
No Description	Zak Marketis	123	13.6	N/A
No Description	Philip Reynolds	118	13.0	N/A
Majority				
Turnout		925	26.06	
Labour hold		Swing		
Labour hold		Swing		

Labour are defending both seats here. They gained one from UKIP in 2019, and the other from the Conservatives in a 2022 by-election after the resignation of Mark Robinson, who came first here in 2019.

=== Thetford Burrell ===
Thetford Burrell (2 seats)
Party	Candidate	Votes	%	±%
Labour	Chris Harvey	546	54.3	+17.0
Labour	David Blackbourn	470	46.7	−0.6
Independent	Carla Barreto	293	29.1	+7.3
Independent	Geoff Mealing	258	25.6	N/A
Independent	Bob Seys	226	22.5	N/A
Majority				
Turnout		1,020	24.12	
Labour hold		Swing		
Labour hold		Swing		

Both seats here were defended by the Labour Party. Chris Harvey was an incumbent councillor: this was also the seat of Breckland's Labour group leader Terry Jermy, though this election he stood instead in Thetford Priory.

=== Thetford Castle ===
Thetford Castle (2 seats)
Party	Candidate	Votes	%	±%
Labour	Ann Blackbourn	465	43.2	+6.7
Labour	Hazel McCambridge	414	38.5	+4.8
Conservative	Jane Lilian James	318	29.6	−18.3
Conservative	Roy Frederick William Brame	305	28.3	−22.4
No Description	Kirstie Robb	159	14.8	N/A
UKIP	Denis Melvin Crawford	153	14.2	N/A
No Description	Ijaz Karim	126	11.7	N/A
Majority				
Turnout		1,092	24.84	
Labour gain from Conservative		Swing		
Labour gain from Conservative		Swing		

The Conservatives were defending both seats with incumbent councillors.

=== Thetford Priory ===
Thetford Priory (2 seats)
Party	Candidate	Votes	%	±%
Labour	Terry Jermy	629	56.6	+19.1
Labour	Mike Brindle	551	49.6	+4.8
Independent	Ron Wood	320	28.8	N/A
No Description	Gordon Margrie	200	18.0	N/A
No Description	Mark Petrie Taylor	199	17.9	−18.2
Majority				
Turnout		1,136	22.77	
Labour hold		Swing		
Labour hold		Swing		

The Labour Party defended both seats here, having gained one from UKIP in 2019. Independent candidate Mark Taylor formerly stood here for UKIP.

=== Upper Wensum ===
Upper Wensum (2 seats)
Party	Candidate	Votes	%	±%
Conservative	Gordon Bambridge	946	52.5	−0.2
Conservative	Bill Borrett	917	50.9	−1.1
Liberal Democrats	Mark Foley	823	45.6	+14.6
Liberal Democrats	Roger Keith Norman	688	38.2	N/A
Majority				
Turnout		1,819	34.95	
Conservative hold		Swing		
Conservative hold		Swing		

The Conservative party defended both seats with incumbent councillors. This was the only seat to have a Liberal Democrat candidate in the previous election.

=== Watton ===
Watton (3 seats)
Party	Candidate	Votes	%	±%
Independent	Keith Stephen Gilbert	903	49.3	−20.3
Conservative	Claire Rosemary Bowes	798	43.6	−0.4
Conservative	Tina Kiddell	770	42.0	−7.0
Independent	Pat Warwick	485	26.5	N/A
Independent	Gilian Lee Turrant	466	25.4	N/A
Labour	Brian English	341	18.6	+2.9
Labour	Andrew Dujon	303	16.5	N/A
Green	Jane Keidan Cooper	299	16.3	−13.4
Labour	Barry John Hale	285	15.6	N/A
Majority				
Turnout		1,842	26.32	
Independent hold		Swing		
Conservative hold		Swing		
Conservative hold		Swing		

The Conservatives defended two of the three seats here with incumbent candidates: the third incumbent councillor is independent Keith Gilbert, who came first in 2019 as well as doing so this year.

== Changes 2023–2027 ==
=== Affiliation changes ===
Date	Councillor	Ward	From	To
May 2024	Tina Kiddell	Watton	Conservative	Independent
19 July 2024	Stephen Fraser	Attleborough Burgh & Havercroft	Independent	Conservative
10 January 2025	Robin Hunter-Clarke	Hermitage	Conservative	Reform UK
19 May 2025	Stephen Fraser	Attleborough Burgh & Havercroft	Conservative	Independent
May 2025	Tina Kiddell	Watton	Independent	Reform UK
14 November 2025	Sarah Taylor	Dereham Toftwood	Labour	Independent

=== By-elections ===
==== Hermitage ====
Hermitage by-election: 2 May 2024
Party	Candidate	Votes	%	±%
Conservative	Robin Hunter-Clarke	313	40.5	+1.8
Liberal Democrats	James Minto	292	37.8	–3.3
Labour	Jose Sisto	168	21.7	+1.5
Majority		21	2.7	N/A
Turnout		781	33.9	–0.4
Registered electors		2,304		
Conservative gain from Liberal Democrats		Swing	▲2.6	

The by-election followed the resignation of Liberal Democrat councillor Mitchell Thurbon in March 2024.

==== Bedingfeld ====
Bedingfeld by-election: 27 February 2025
Party	Candidate	Votes	%	±%
Reform	Scott Hussey	414	54.3	N/A
Conservative	Paula Ann Wood	209	27.4	−25.2
Labour	Doug Jefferson	99	13.0	−14.1
Green	Timothy Soar	41	5.4	N/A
Majority		205	26.9	
Turnout		763	29.9	
Registered electors		2,555		
Reform gain from Conservative		Swing		

The by-election followed the resignation of Conservative councillor Ian Sherwood.

==== Thetford Priory ====
Thetford Priory by-election: 1 May 2025
Party	Candidate	Votes	%	±%
Reform	Michael Westman	449	45.3	N/A
Labour	Douglas Jefferson	292	29.5	−27.1
Conservative	Jane James	166	16.8	N/A
Green	Timothy Soar	46	4.6	N/A
Liberal Democrats	James Minto	38	3.8	N/A
Majority		157	15.8	
Turnout		1,000	19.26	
Registered electors		5,192		
Reform gain from Labour		Swing		

The by-election followed the resignation of Labour councillor Terry Jermy in March 2025, after he had been elected as the MP for South West Norfolk.

==== Thetford Castle ====
Thetford Castle by-election: 24 September 2025
Party	Candidate	Votes	%	±%
Reform	Grahame Middleton	512	47.3	N/A
Labour	Elizabeth Bernard	289	26.7	−16.5
Conservative	Jane James	164	15.1	−14.5
Liberal Democrats	James Minto	118	10.9	N/A
Majority		223	20.6	N/A
Turnout		1,094	24.9	+2.1
Registered electors		4,390		
Reform gain from Labour				

The by-election followed the resignation of Labour councillor Hazel McCambridge on health grounds.

==== Dereham Toftwood ====
Dereham Toftwood by-election: 16 July 2026
Party	Candidate	Votes	%	±%
Conservative	Stuart Green	458	45.8	−1.7
Reform	Gokce Schuler	369	36.9	N/A
Labour	Robin Goreham	172	17.2	−35.3
Majority		89	8.8	N/A
Turnout		1,010	21.8	
Registered electors		4,640		
Conservative gain from Independent				

The by-election followed the resignation of independent councillor Sarah Taylor, who had been elected for Labour in 2023.
