= Manhunt (2019 TV series) =

British TV crime drama

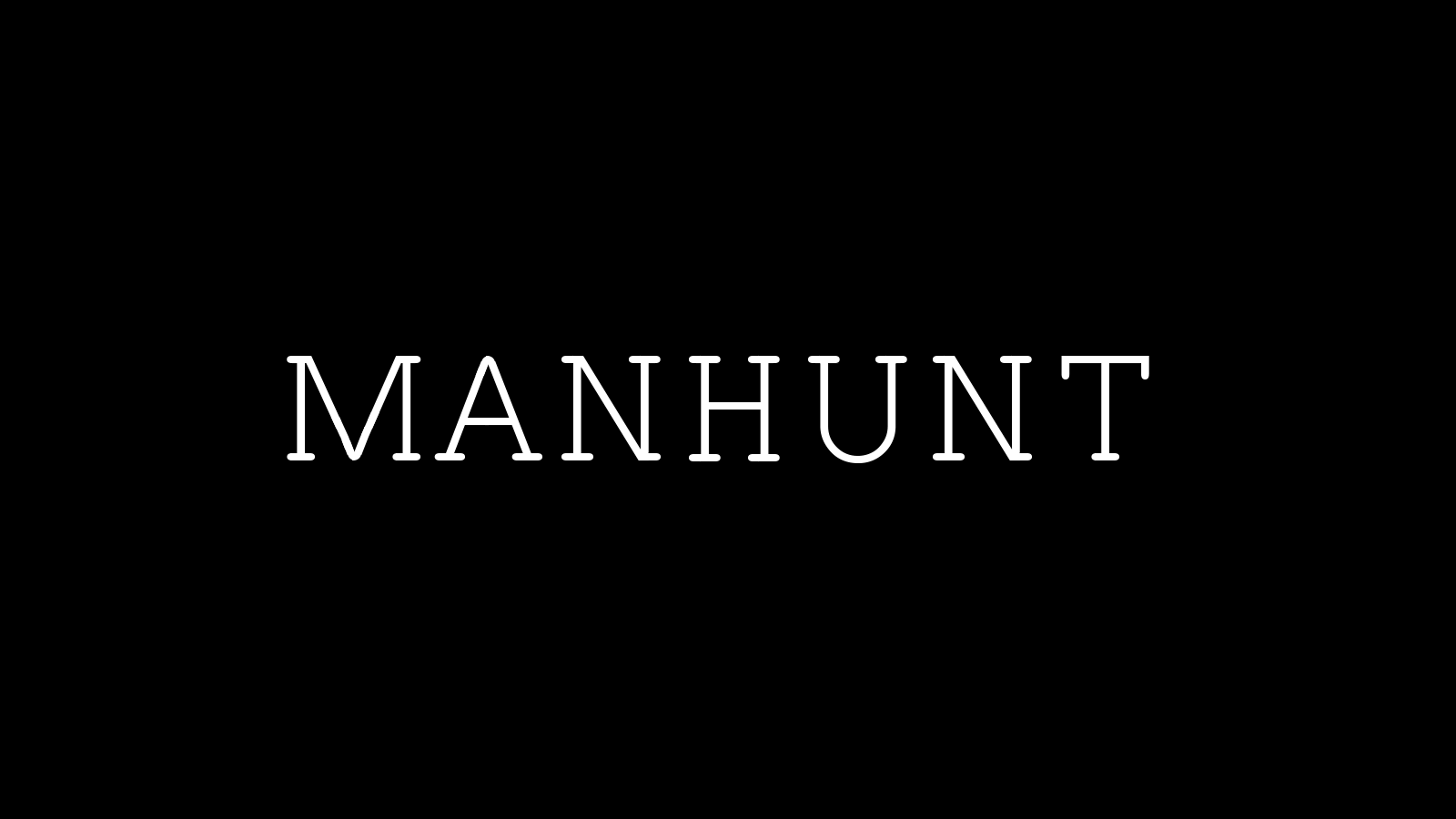
- Genre: Crime drama
- Written by: Colin Sutton; Ed Whitmore
- Directed by: Marc Evans
- Starring: Martin Clunes; Claudie Blakley; Stephen Wight
- Country of origin: United Kingdom
- Original language: English
- No. of series: 2
- No. of episodes: 7

Production
- Executive producer: Phillippa Braithwaite
- Producer: Jo Willett
- Production location: United Kingdom
- Cinematography: Baz Irvine
- Running time: 46 minutes
- Production company: Buffalo Pictures

Original release
- Network: ITV
- Release: 6 January 2019 – 23 September 2021

Manhunt is a British television drama based on murder investigations. The first series focused on the true story surrounding the investigation into the death of French student Amélie Delagrange. The subsequent manhunt eventually led to the arrest of Levi Bellfield for Delagrange's murder, and several other high profile, yet previously unsolved cases.

The series was first shown in the United Kingdom on 6 January 2019, airing on three consecutive nights. Consolidated figures show an average of 8.7 million viewers across the three episodes, rising further to 9 million viewers when online viewing is included. This made the series ITV's highest rated launch of a new drama series since the first series of Broadchurch in 2013. The series has so far won two BAFTA Cymru awards: Best Director, Fiction for Marc Evans, and Best Actor for Celyn Jones. On 6 March 2019, the show was renewed for a second series which premiered on 20 September 2021.

== Plot ==
=== Series 1 ===
On the evening of 19 August 2004, a young woman has been attacked on Twickenham Green, in the south-west of Greater London. The victim, identified as Amélie Delagrange, is a 22-year-old French student visiting the UK. She dies in hospital from serious head injuries.

Metropolitan Police select Detective Chief Inspector Colin Sutton to lead a large task force as Senior Investigating Officer. No forensic evidence can be procured from the scene, and there are no links in Delagrange's past that could indicate a motive. There have been several previous attacks and murders of young women in the area, and within 24 hours, the investigation establishes that she might have been killed by the same person who killed Marsha McDonnell on 3 February 2003.

Cell tower data indicates Delagrange's phone last made contact to the network in an area close by the river, several miles from the green where she was found. Despite pressure to send divers elsewhere, Sutton insists on dredging the river (Thames) by the nearest car crossing, Walton Bridge, and finally finds the phone and other items owned by the victim. Again resisting doubts, this time from within his own team, Sutton decides to employ a significant portion of his team to survey CCTV footage from the night of the attack. A suspicious white van moving around at the time of the attack is found, but it cannot be readily identified since there are over 25,000 similar vans in the UK.

When Sutton prioritizes the case over his personal life, missing out on holidays and birthdays, he and his wife Louise argue over possible links to a similar case involving the murder of Milly Dowler, a 13-year-old girl in Surrey, where Louise works as a police analyst. She reveals that her superiors, aware of her link to Sutton, have forbidden her to discuss that case with him.

A woman police constable (WPC) who attended the initial crime scene reminds Sutton about a witness report of the day, leading him to a possible suspect named Levi Bellfield, a self-employed vehicle clamping operator. It is known that he is violent, and very aggressive to the numerous women in his life; and that he owns several vehicles, including a white van.

Sutton scales back a nationwide search for the van, and instead mounts a comprehensive surveillance operation on Bellfield. It soon becomes clear he actively approaches girls and young women, scaring them. The team learns that he once owned a white people-carrier of a similar description to one used to run over and nearly kill a young woman, named Sarah Knight. They also learn he once lived very close to the site of the Surrey murder. It becomes clear to Sutton that Bellfield is not only their man, but that he is likely to strike again. Sutton only lets the Surrey Police officer DCI Marjoram, previously in charge of the Milly Dowler case, who he visits privately at home so there can be no leak to the press, know about Bellfield. He swears Marjoram to silence.

A large operation is drawn up to facilitate Bellfield's arrest and at the same time to strike at the addresses of known associates to prevent the loss of possible forensic evidence. But out of the blue a leak to the press alerts the News of the World, a large sensationalist tabloid in the UK, which plans to run a story of the impending operation well before Sutton and his team are ready. This would alert Bellfield who might well "do a runner." To make the News of the World postpone its story, the investigating team agree to let a journalist and photographer join the operation to get first-hand access to the bust.

At first, due to the leak, it seems Bellfield has given them the slip, but his current partner Laura Marsh soon reveals he is hiding in the attic, and he is safely apprehended. This gives Sutton and his team just 72 hours before they must charge him with a crime or set him free. With insufficient evidence to link Bellfield to the vehicles used in the various murders at specific times and places, they enlist the cooperation of Marsh to detain Bellfield on a charge of assaulting and raping her, giving them time to keep building their murder charge. At his bail hearing, Bellfield displays his violent temper when he learns he will be incarcerated at Milton Keynes, located well outside London.

Finally receiving the support of investigators working on the Milly Dowler case, the team find CCTV evidence tying Bellfield to that case, evidence that had previously been overlooked. Realizing that Amélie Delagrange might not have been murdered had the evidence been found earlier, Sutton travels to France to apologize to her parents.

Finally, again with Laura Marsh's assistance, the investigators find a supermarket receipt that backs up her story about Bellfield on the day of Amélie’s murder and also him being alone in their previous home, very close to the site of the Milly Dowler disappearance, on the very day of that crime. The series ends with the prosecutor finally being satisfied by the available evidence and deciding to charge Bellfield with the murder of Delagrange, as well as the hit-and-run of Sarah Knight, with the murder of Marsha McDonnell to hopefully follow.

An ending note informs the viewer that on 25 February 2008 Levi Bellfield was convicted of the murders of Marsha McDonnell and Amélie Delagrange and the attempted murder of Sarah Knight, and sentenced to three life sentences with a recommendation to never be released from prison. Furthermore, that on 23 June 2011, Bellfield was found guilty of the murder of Milly Dowler, and sentenced to a second life imprisonment.

=== Series 2 ===
The second series focuses on the search for serial rapist Delroy Grant.

It begins with a daughter checking up on her mother. She is found hiding inside her cabinet wailing.

17 years later in 2009, Sutton is being called up again New Scotland Yard. He is tasked with reviewing a 17-year ongoing serial rape case, Operation Minstead.

== Cast ==
- Martin Clunes as Detective Chief Inspector Colin Sutton, Senior Investigating Officer for the case
- Claudie Blakley as Louise Sutton, Colin's wife, a Surrey police analyst
- Stephen Wight as Detective Constable Clive Grace

=== Series 1 ===
- Katie Lyons as Detective Sergeant Jo Brunt
- Steffan Rhodri as DC Neil Jones
- Celyn Jones as Levi Bellfield
- Kiera Bell as Amélie Delagrange
- Hannah Banks as Marsha McDonnell
- Cara Theobold as Laura Marsh
- Christopher Fulford as DCI Marjoram

=== Series 2 ===
- Bally Gill as DC Jim Corgan
- Matthew Gravelle as DI Nathan Eason
- Sule Rimi as DS Neville Hylton
- Ian Conningham as Richard Moore
- Diveen Henry as DC Patricia Henry
- David Witts as DC Adam Spier
- Matt Bardock as Detective Supt Simon Morgan
- Jude Akuwudike as Delroy Grant

== Development ==
The series is written by screenwriter Ed Whitmore, based on the memoirs of real-life former Met police detective DCI Colin Sutton.

On 6 March 2019, the show was renewed for a second series, initially to premiere in 2020. The second series was confirmed by ITV in November 2020, with a premiere date of 20 September 2021.

In November of that year, the real-life Colin Sutton and chief writer Ed Whitmore discussed the possibility of a third series.

== Episodes ==
Series overview
| Series | Episodes | Originally released | |
| Series | Episodes | First released | Last released |
|---|---|---|---|
| 1 | 3 | 6 January 2019 | 8 January 2019 |
| 2 | 4 | 20 September 2021 | 23 September 2021 |

=== Series 1 (2019) ===
| No. in series | Title | Directed by | Written by | Original release date |
|---|---|---|---|---|
| 1 | "The First Day" | Marc Evans | Ed Whitmore | 6 January 2019 |
| 2 | "The Van" | Marc Evans | Ed Whitmore | 7 January 2019 |
| 3 | "The Suspect" | Marc Evans | Ed Whitmore | 8 January 2019 |

=== Series 2 – The Night Stalker (2021) ===
| No. in series | Title | Directed by | Written by | Original release date |
|---|---|---|---|---|
| 1 | "Episode 1" | Marc Evans | Ed Whitmore | 20 September 2021 |
| 2 | "Episode 2" | Marc Evans | Ed Whitmore | 21 September 2021 |
| 3 | "Episode 3" | Marc Evans | Ed Whitmore | 22 September 2021 |
| 4 | "Episode 4" | Marc Evans | Ed Whitmore | 23 September 2021 |

== Reception ==
British newspapers posted reviews after the first episode. The Guardian praised the scripting together with the "fine work...fleetness and lightness of touch" of Clunes's performance. The Sunday Times said that "The art of telling true stories without resorting to sensation or cliché was expertly showcased by Manhunt, a deftly constructed three-part dramatisation of the 2004 police pursuit of London serial killer Levi Bellfield".

US media reviewed the series in its entirety a month later. The Hollywood Reporter has this to say: "In Manhunt, there's something likably precise in the old-school focus on how much boring paperwork, staff-wide effort and luck goes into piecing together a complex case," and considers it "keenly British". The New York Times called it "The hit of the year in Britain so far".

The series won two BAFTA Cymru awards: Best Director, Fiction for Marc Evans, and Best Actor for Celyn Jones, and was also a finalist in the C21 International Drama Awards for Best Mini Series. Script Writer Ed Whitmore has been nominated for a Mystery Writers of America 2020 Edgar Award for Best Television Episode Teleplay.

== See also ==
- Murder of Patsy Morris, another murder linked to Bellfield. Morris was his childhood girlfriend.
