= Colin Sutton =

Colin Sutton may refer to:

- Colin Sutton (police officer, born 1938) (1938–2004), British police officer, assistant commissioner of the Metropolitan Police
- Colin Sutton (police and crime commissioner), British police officer and police and crime commissioner of Norfolk
