= Lorne Green =

Canadian politician and diplomat

Lorne Edmond Green

Norfolk Police and Crime Commissioner
- In office 5 May 2016 – 8 May 2021
- Preceded by: Stephen Bett
- Succeeded by: Giles Orpen-Smellie

Personal details
- Born: 1946 (age 79–80)
- Citizenship: British, Canadian
- Party: Conservative
- Education: Dalhousie University

Lorne Edmond Green is a Canadian-born English politician and former diplomat, who was Police and Crime Commissioner for Norfolk, representing the Conservative Party. Green was elected to the post on 5 May 2016, succeeding the previous incumbent, Stephen Bett.

== Biography ==
=== Diplomacy ===
Born in Nova Scotia, Green is a graduate of Dalhousie University in Halifax. He joined the Canadian Department of External Affairs after graduation, and held diplomatic posts in Pakistan, Iran and Yugoslavia, as well as serving at the Canadian High Commission in London under Paul Martin, where he was promoted to become the mission's press officer. In the 1980s, he served on NATO's Nuclear Planning Group in Brussels dealing with the controversy surrounding cruise missiles. He was also Director of Nuclear and Arms Control Policy in the Department of National Defence in Ottawa, Ontario.

In 1998, he left External Affairs to help form the World Nuclear Transport Institute in London, and later retired from the diplomatic world in 2011, opening a coffee shop in Snettisham.

=== Police and Crime Commissioner ===
In 2015, Green was approached by the local Conservative Party association to stand in the 2016 election for Norfolk Police and Crime Commissioner, which he won in May 2016. Green chose not to stand for re-election, citing the long drive between his home in King's Lynn and the office in Wymondham. After the election was postponed by a year due to the COVID-19 pandemic, he was eventually succeeded by Giles Orpen-Smellie in May 2021.

== Electoral record ==
Norfolk Police and Crime Commissioner election, 2016
Party	Candidate	1st round		2nd round			1st round votesTransfer votes, 2nd round
Party	Candidate	Total	Of round	Transfers	Total	Of round	1st round votesTransfer votes, 2nd round
Conservative	Lorne Green	42,928	27.76%	17,133	60,061	54.43	
Labour	Chris Jones	37,141	24.02%	13,146	50,287	45.57	
UKIP	David Moreland	27,030	17.48%				
Independent	Stephen Bett	25,527	16.51%				
Liberal Democrats	Jacky Howe	12,838	8.30%				
Green	Martin Schmierer	9,187	5.94%				
Turnout		154,651	23.20%				
Conservative gain from Independent							
