= Colin Sutton (police and crime commissioner) =

British police officer and politician

Norfolk Police and Crime Commissioner
- Incumbent
- Assumed office 17 July 2026
- Preceded by: Sarah Taylor

Personal details
- Party: Reform UK
- Occupation: Politician

Colin Sutton is a British politician serving as Police and Crime Commissioner for Norfolk since 2026 and a former police officer.

== Biography ==
He was previously a Detective Chief Inspector for the Metropolitan Police and led the investigation into the serial killer Levi Bellfield and serial rapist Delroy Grant. His memoirs on the investigation were adapted into the ITV drama Manhunt. He retired from his position in 2011.

Sutton was named Reform UK's national policing and crime advisor in 2025. After being selected as their candidate, he was elected Norfolk Police and Crime Commissioner in the 2026 Norfolk Police and Crime Commissioner by-election, with a majority of 14,000.

In September 2026, Sutton announced a theatre tour with 127 individual shows. Later, he said he decided "wasn't going to do" the tour, after receiving criticism that the tour would detract from his ability to undertake the duties of an elected PCC.

== Personal life ==
Sutton lives near Diss, Norfolk.
