= Alan Wilkie (judge) =

British judge

Sir Alan Wilkie
- Royal coat of arms of the United Kingdom

Justice of the High Court
- Incumbent
- Assumed office 1 October 2004

Circuit Judge
- In office 9 April 1997 – 1 October 2004

Personal details
- Born: Alan Fraser Wilkie; 26 December 1947 (age 78)
- Education: Hutchesons' Grammar School; Manchester Grammar School
- Alma mater: Balliol College, Oxford

Sir Alan Fraser Wilkie (born 26 December 1947), styled The Honourable Mr Justice Wilkie, is a former British judge and barrister. He retired on 31 January 2017.

== Early life ==
Wilkie was born on 26 December 1947. He was educated at Hutchesons' Grammar School, a private school in Glasgow, Scotland, and Manchester Grammar School, an all-boys independent school in Manchester, England. He studied law at Balliol College, Oxford.

== Legal career ==
Wilkie was called to the bar at Inner Temple in 1974. He was made a Queen's Counsel (QC) on 28 April 1992. On 27 January 1995, he was appointed to the South Eastern Circuit as a Recorder, a part-time judge.

Wilkie became a full-time judge in 1997. On 9 April, he was appointed a circuit judge. He was a judge of the High Court of Justice (Queen's Bench Division) from 1 October 2004 until 2017. He was a Presiding Judge of the North Eastern Circuit from 2007 to 2010. On 1 April 2012, he was appointed to the Judicial Appointments Commission for a five-year period.

Notable cases that Wilkie presided over include the trial of Lord Ahmed for causing death by dangerous driving, the Milly Dowler murder trial, the trial of Bishop Peter Ball for sexual abuse, and the trial of Thomas Mair for the murder of Batley and Spen MP Jo Cox. Wilkie sentenced John and Anne Darwin in 2008 for faking John's death in a canoe accident.

He concluded that the London Bridge Terrorist Usman Kahn was so dangerous "that the public could only be protected by the imposition of an indeterminate sentence". This conclusion was overturned by the Court of Appeal under Sir Brian Leveson with the result that Kahn was let out on licence and stabbed two people to death in November 2019.

== Personal life ==
Wilkie married Susan in 1972.

== Honours ==
Wilkie was made a Knight Bachelor upon becoming a High Court Judge in 2004. He is an Honorary Member of The Society of Legal Scholars.
