= Sarah Taylor (police commissioner) =

British politician (born 1977)

Norfolk Police and Crime Commissioner
- In office 9 May 2024 – 5 June 2026
- Preceded by: Giles Orpen-Smellie
- Succeeded by: Colin Sutton

Breckland District Councillor for Dereham Toftwood
- In office 4 May 2023 – 9 May 2024

Personal details
- Born: Sarah Simpson; 1977 (age 48–49)
- Party: Independent (since 2025)
- Other political affiliations: Labour (2006–2025)
- Education: University of East Anglia; University of Leeds

Sarah Taylor (née Simpson; born 1977) is a British politician who served as Norfolk Police and Crime Commissioner from 2024 until her resignation in 2026.

== Education ==
Taylor studied linguistics at the University of East Anglia and for a master's in engineering at the University of Leeds.

== Political career ==
Taylor (then known as Sarah Simpson) was the Labour candidate in Mid Norfolk in 2017, finishing second of five candidates with 16,742 votes (30.1%).

In the 2023 Breckland District Council election, Taylor was elected as a Labour district councillor for the Dereham Toftwood ward.

Taylor stood successfully as the Labour candidate for Norfolk Police and Crime Commissioner the May 2024 police and crime commissioner elections. She defeated Giles Orpen-Smellie of the Conservative Party, the incumbent since 2021. In November 2025, following the UK government announcing its intention to scrap police and crime commissioners, Taylor resigned from the Labour Party and sent a letter to the prime minister outlining various disagreements with the government.

She resigned as both PCC and councillor in June 2026, triggering the 2026 Norfolk Police and Crime Commissioner by-election, which was won by Colin Sutton of Reform UK. She subsequently began working for a global consultancy firm.
