= Delroy Grant =

Jamaican convicted serial rapist (born 1957)

- Born: Delroy Easton Grant; 3 September 1957 (age 69); Kingston, Colony of Jamaica, British Empire
- Known for: A series of burglaries, rapes and sexual assaults on elderly victims, between October 1992 and May 2009 in the South East of London.
- Status: Imprisoned
- Criminal charges: Rape, indecent assault, burglary
- Penalty: Life imprisonment minimum term 27 years (2011)

Details
- Span of crimes: 1992–2009
- Country: England
- Date apprehended: 2009
- Imprisoned at: HM Prison Belmarsh

Delroy Easton Grant (born 3 September 1957) is a Jamaican convicted serial rapist who committed a series of burglaries, rapes and sexual assaults between October 1992 and May 2009 in South East London in England.

Grant, also known as the Minstead Rapist and later the Night Stalker, is thought to have been active since 1990. He had a distinctive modus operandi, preying primarily on elderly women who lived alone. He is suspected of over 100 offences from 1990 to 2009.

In 1998, the Metropolitan Police launched Operation Minstead with a dedicated team to investigate the crimes, based at Lewisham police station. By 2005, the operation was the largest and most complex rape investigation ever undertaken by the Metropolitan Police.

On 24 March 2011, Grant was found guilty of 22 offences. The following day he was given four life sentences and ordered to serve a minimum of 27 years in prison.

Operation Minstead was dramatised in the second series of the British television show Manhunt, based on the memoirs of former Detective Chief Inspector Colin Sutton, first broadcast in 2021.

== Emergence of a linked series ==
Grant was an accomplished burglar and had broken into the homes of over 90 women aged between 68 and 93. He was positively linked to four reported rapes and around 30 other sexual assaults. Police believe he was also responsible for at least another two rapes where the victims felt unable to make any official allegation. The true total may be higher as his victims were often too traumatised to speak to police.

In addition, the Operation Minstead (Note: The name was chosen from an alphabetical list of English villages, the method of operational naming in use at the time.) investigation team had to decide which incidents were unmistakably the work of the same offender and which were similar but possibly unrelated. Therefore, many possible Minstead incidents flagged up by police for the attention of the Operation Minstead team could not be definitely confirmed as the work of the same offender, and so had to be excluded from the linked series. The confirmed series of offences began in October 1992 in the Shirley area of Croydon. However, because of a break of four years between this first attack and a spate of others, Operation Minstead was not set up until 1998.

Although committing many crimes, Grant was dormant for long periods. After the first attack in October 1992, no further offences were reported until 1997. After a particularly violent rape on 5 August 1999 where his victim almost died from her injuries, there was another long break. This prompted some media speculation that the rapist had been imprisoned for an unrelated offence or that he had died. On 13 October 2002, ten years after the first attack, he struck again. Seven confirmed attacks took place in the summer of 2003. Another break then followed.

A further series of confirmed attacks took place towards the end of 2008, and into mid-2009.

Detective Superintendent Simon Morgan, who headed the Minstead team from 2001 to October 2009, explained the problems in arriving at a definitive total of offences in this series by saying, "His victims come from a generation who are inclined to see good in everyone. One thanked him for being gentle when he raped her." Another said she did not want to dial 999 "because I know the police are already so busy."

== Geographical spread ==
The offences occurred in defined geographical clusters in and around South East London. Most of the offences occurred around Shirley in Croydon, and in Orpington. However he also struck in Coulsdon, Forest Hill, Catford, Brockley, Bromley, Beckenham, Dulwich and Sidcup. Only once was there a report of his offending outside Greater London. This was in Warlingham, Surrey.

The fact that many offences had taken place in Orpington, including one on Boxing Day in 1998, led detectives to suspect the rapist had a link to the area. Det Supt Morgan commented, "He either lives, works or has some connection with someone he visits in Orpington. This could be a child, a school or a job". On three occasions, the rapist made remarks about having to get to Brighton.

== Modus operandi ==
Grant gained entry to the homes of his victims from the side or the rear, either through open windows or by removing a window pane entirely. He had been known to use tools stolen from the victim's own garden shed to remove the window beading. He ripped out the telephone wires, either before entering the property, or after gaining access. He then disabled the lights either by switching off the electricity at the meter or by removing lightbulbs from their sockets.

He then approached his victim, shining a torch in her eyes. Often his first words were to demand sex. However, he had been known to spend hours in victims' homes either before or without assaulting them. He exhibited a knowledge of geriatrics, knowing how to support his elderly victim's spine and how to pick her up by the elbow. He had sometimes been shamed into leaving without committing a sexual assault when his victim had chastised him. Of particular note is an incident where one victim caused him to apologise and leave by angrily demanding, "What would your mother think of you?" Police have speculated that Grant was ashamed of his actions, perhaps explaining the long period that sometimes occurred between offences. Despite this, he could be extremely violent. During his most violent attack on 5 August 1999, he raped his victim twice and left her bleeding from a perforated bowel, injuries which nearly proved fatal.

Grant had been known to burgle his victims, but this was not his primary motive. He often took money, but only small amounts. He also took credit cards and obtained their PINs. In 2004 he stole a wad of five-pound notes, but these were later discovered thrown away a mile and a half from his victim's house. He had also taken jewellery. The same year he told a victim that his mother had died four years earlier, stating that "the Government let her down anyway".

He struck on all days of the week, but most often during the early hours of a Friday or Saturday morning.

Detectives strongly believed that he rode a motorbike.

== Suspect description ==
Descriptions from his many victims suggested a black male aged between 25 and 40. He was described as about 5'9" to 5'11" tall, of slim athletic build and tending to wear dark clothing. He was usually wearing gloves, a mask or balaclava, and occasionally a baseball cap. He was also described as having a soft or well-spoken voice. Some of his victims reported a curious sweet smell.

== DNA controversy ==
The Minstead Rapist was thought to be forensically aware since he never left a fingerprint at any scene. However, an offence committed on 13 October 2002 left behind a vital clue: a footprint from a size 10 Nike Air Terra Contego trainer. Most importantly he did not use condoms and his DNA was captured. The first time his DNA was discovered at a scene was in 1992. Thereafter, more than 2,000 DNA samples were collected from suspects.

Britain's national police DNA database contains samples from anyone arrested for a recordable offence since 1995. Even by the time of his first offence, the Minstead Rapist was clearly an accomplished burglar. However, his DNA remained unmatched and unidentified on the database. If the rapist had ever been arrested for burglary or a related offence, it would have to have been after 1995, when police began routinely to gather DNA samples from prisoners.

Advanced DNA techniques pointed towards a north Afro-Caribbean ethnic origin for the rapist; probably the Windward Islands: St Lucia, Barbados, St Vincent and the Grenadines, Tobago or Trinidad. Operation Minstead identified around 21,000 possible suspects that fitted such a profile.

In March 2004, Operation Minstead detectives hand-delivered a letter to hundreds of black men in South London, asking for their help in voluntarily providing DNA samples for elimination purposes. Police explained that they desperately needed to reduce the vast number of suspects in the operation and that this was the best way to do so. Volunteers were assured that their DNA samples would be destroyed as soon as they were confirmed to be unmatched with the rapist's DNA. The majority of those potential suspects were eager to help if it would assist police in catching the suspect. However, 125 men initially refused to provide samples believing that the exercise was discriminatory and breached their human rights. Police brought pressure to bear on those who refused, explaining that their behaviour could be construed as suspicious. Five objectors were subsequently arrested but cleared. This incident was seen by some commentators, particularly The Voice newspaper and Liberty, as an abuse of power that damaged relations between London's black community and the police. A Liberal Democrat MP, Lynne Featherstone, questioned police tactics in the House of Commons. Although they were able to reduce the list of potential suspects from 21,000 to 1,000, police resigned themselves to being able only to obtain the DNA of certain suspects still on the list if or when they were arrested for an unrelated offence.

== Arrest and trial ==
According to newspaper reports the suspect was seen by cash machine CCTV cameras using his victims' credit and debit cards but the footage appeared to be useless as his face was always covered by a mask. When viewing some of the footage, one police officer spotted the reflection of a bus in a shop window. The bus was tracked down and was found to be fitted with cameras. Police trawled through the CCTV footage recorded by the bus. On the recording a Vauxhall Zafira was spotted near the cash machine and vehicle records pinpointed all models in the South London area.

On Saturday 14 November 2009, a Zafira was spotted parked in the Shirley area of Croydon, which was already being staked out by 70 police officers following recent break-ins believed to have been carried out by the Night Stalker. An officer saw a suspicious man run towards the car and drive off. The car was stopped and searched. In the boot were a crowbar, spare clothes, gloves and a hat. At the place where it had been parked a police dog followed a scent back to a house which had just been burgled. On 16 November, it was reported that Delroy Grant of Brockley Mews, Brockley, South East London, had been arrested and charged with twenty-two offences, and appeared at Greenwich Magistrates’ Court. He was remanded in custody to re-appear at the court on 19 November.

On 19 November 2009, Grant appeared at Greenwich Magistrates’ Court, where he was ordered to appear at Woolwich Crown Court on Thursday 26 November. Prosecutors said that further charges were likely. He was remanded in custody.

On 26 November 2009, Grant appeared at Woolwich Crown Court. He was remanded in custody, next due to appear at the Old Bailey for a plea and case management hearing on 8 February 2010.

On 8 February 2010, he was remanded in custody and was next due to appear at Inner London Crown Court on 30 April 2010.

On 21 June 2010, Grant pleaded not guilty at the Old Bailey. Mr Justice Bean said the trial would take place on 1 March 2011, at Woolwich Crown Court; it was thought the trial would take up to six weeks.

The charges were as follows:

1. Rape – on 12/10/1992 at Shirley, on an 89-year-old woman
2. Rape – on 5/9/1998 at Warlingham, Surrey, on an 81-year-old woman
3. Rape – on 28/7/1999 at Addiscombe, on an 82-year-old woman
4. Rape – on 5/8/1999 at Orpington, on an 88-year-old woman
5. Indecent assault – on 20/6/1999 at Beckenham of a 71-year-old woman
6. Indecent assault – on 12/7/1999 at Addiscombe of an 82-year-old woman
7. Indecent assault – on 4/8/1999 at Shirley on an 88-year-old woman
8. Indecent assault – on 13/10/2002 at Shirley on a 77-year-old woman
9. Burglary (no violence) – on 25/5/2009 at Shortlands, Bromley
10. Burglary (theft/attempted theft with violence) – on 12/10/1992 at Shirley
11. Burglary with intent to rape – on 5/9/1998 at Warlingham, Surrey
12. Indecent assault – on 5/9/1998 at Warlingham, Surrey, of an 81-year-old woman
13. Burglary (theft/attempted theft with violence) – on 12/7/1999 at Addiscombe
14. Burglary (theft/attempted theft with violence) – on 28/7/1999 at Addiscombe
15. Indecent assault – on 28/7/1999 at Addiscombe, of an 82-year-old woman
16. Burglary (theft/attempted theft with violence) – on 4/8/1999 at Shirley.
17. Burglary (theft/attempted theft with violence) – on 5/8/1999 at Orpington
18. Rape – on 5/8/1999 at Orpington, on an 88-year-old woman
19. Burglary (theft/attempted theft with violence) – on 13/12/2002 at Shirley
20. Burglary (theft/attempted theft with violence) – on 7/3/2003 at West Dulwich
21. Burglary (theft/attempted theft with violence) – on 7/9/2004 at Bromley
22. Burglary (theft/attempted theft with violence) – on 20/6/1999 at Beckenham

On 24 March 2011 Grant was found guilty of all offences charged. He was sentenced to four concurrent life sentences with a recommendation that he should serve 27 years before being eligible to apply for parole. Grant was also given concurrent eight-year sentences for seven indecent assaults, and concurrent six-year sentences for 18 burglaries and attempted burglaries.

== Investigation timeline ==
- 1990: Police said there were probable offences as far back as 1990.
- 2003 – 5 December: The SCD launched an appeal to all Metropolitan Police officers for assistance to catch the Minstead Rapist.
- 2004 – March: Police carried out DNA testing of possible suspects in South London.
- 2004 – July: Detectives announced they had narrowed the initial list of 21,000 potential suspects to 1,000.
- 2006 – 10 October: Metropolitan Police officers issued a direct appeal to the rapist to give himself up, encouraging him to use his "conscience" and "come forward" to seek help for his behaviour.
- 2007 – 15 November: A burglary in South Norwood, London is linked to the Minstead man. The victim was a 93-year-old woman and the incident took place in the early hours of Thursday, 15 November.
- 2009 – June: A string of burglaries on the elderly were linked to a light-skinned black man, suspected of being the Night Stalker.
- 2009 – July: An incident linked to the Night Stalker occurred in Selsdon, South Croydon on the morning of 23 July.
- 2009 – August: A 77-year-old man was sexually assaulted as Grant burgled his home in Thornton Heath.
- 2009 – 15 November: Police arrested Grant in connection with more than 100 sex attacks. The arrest was described as "significant".
- 2009 – 16 November ~3am: Police charged Grant with multiple rapes.
- 2011 – 1 March: Grant appeared at Woolwich Crown Court as his trial began.
- 2011 – 24 March: Grant was found guilty on all counts.
- 2011 – 25 March: Grant is given four life sentences with a minimum of 27 years to be served.

== In popular culture ==
Grant was played by Jude Akuwudike in series two of Manhunt (2021).

== See also ==
- List of serial rapists
- Batman rapist – an unidentified British serial rapist who has eluded capture since 1991
- House for sale rapist – an unidentified UK serial rapist who has been at large since 1979. Suspected to be John Cannan
- Michael Weir – similar London burglar of the elderly active around the same time
