= Norfolk Constabulary =

English territorial police force

- Common name: Norfolk Police
- Motto: Our Priority is You

Agency overview
- Formed: 22 November 1839; 186 years ago
- Preceding agencies: Norfolk County Constabulary; Norwich City Police; Great Yarmouth Borough Police
- Employees: 1,897 police officers; 1,318 police staff
- Volunteers: 163 special constables; 103 police support volunteers
- Annual budget: £204 Million (2023 - 2024)

Jurisdictional structure
- Operations jurisdiction: Norfolk, England, UK
- Map of police area
- Area: 2,079 square miles (5,380 km^{2})
- Population: 908,000
- Legal jurisdiction: England and Wales
- Constituting instrument: Police Act 1996
- General nature: Local civilian police

Operational structure
- Overseen by: His Majesty's Inspectorate of Constabulary and Fire & Rescue Services; Independent Office for Police Conduct
- Headquarters: Wymondham
- Constables: 1,897 police officers; 163 special constables
- Police and crime commissioner responsible: Colin Sutton
- Agency executive: Paul Sanford, Chief constable

Website
- www.norfolk.police.uk

Norfolk Constabulary is the territorial police force responsible for policing Norfolk in East Anglia, England. The force serves a population of 908,000 in a mostly rural area of 2,079 square miles (5,380 km^{2}), including 90 miles (140 km) of coastline and 16 rivers, including the Broads National Park. Headquartered in Wymondham, Norfolk is responsible for the City of Norwich, along with King's Lynn, Great Yarmouth and Thetford. As of March 2023, the force has a strength of 1,897 police officers, 163 special constables, 1,318 police staff/designated officers, and 103 police support volunteers. The chief constable is Paul Sanford, and the police and crime commissioner (PCC) is Colin Sutton (Reform).

== History ==
=== 19th and 20th centuries ===
Wymondham had its own parish police force from November 1833 until 1840. It was formed under the provisions of the Watching and Lighting Act 1833 to combat constant disturbances and depredation within the parish. It had a strength of 3 constables.

Norwich City Police / Great Yarmouth Borough Police / King's Lynn Borough Police were formed in 1836 following the Municipal Corporations Act 1835, which required local councils to appoint paid constable to keep the peace. Between 1858 - 1901 Norwich City Police maintained a strength of approx 100 constables.

Norfolk County Constabulary was founded as a county force on 22 November 1839 under the County Police Act 1839, and was one of the first county forces to be formed. It formerly begun operating in 1840. Initially, the force had a recommended strength of one chief constable, 12 superintendents and 120 constables, spread over approximately 12 districts. Wymondham Police was merged with Norfolk County Constabulary upon its inception in 1840.

Thetford also had its own borough police force until 1857 where it was merged with Norfolk County Constabulary. King's Lynn Borough Police was amalgamated with the County Force in 1947 following the Police Act 1946.

In 1910, Great Yarmouth Borough Police had a strength of 68 constables and six horses.

In 1965, Norfolk County Constabulary had an establishment of 636 officers and an actual strength of 529. In 1968, it amalgamated with Norwich City Police and Great Yarmouth Borough Police (under the Police Act 1964) to form the Norfolk Joint Constabulary. In 1974, it returned to the present name Norfolk Constabulary.

=== 21st century ===
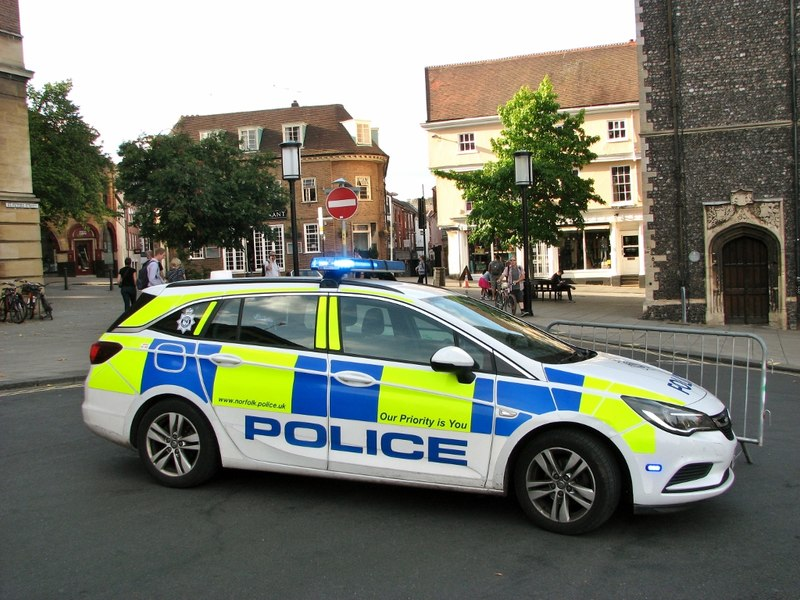
Norfolk Police car pictured in 2019

In March 2006, proposals were made by the Home Secretary which would see the force merge with neighbouring forces Cambridgeshire Constabulary and Suffolk Constabulary to form a strategic police force for East Anglia. The Norfolk Police Authority was enthusiastic for the merger, but the neighbouring forces were not. With the announcement in July 2006 by the Home Office that the principle of merger was under review, the Norfolk Constabulary announced their intention to recruit a permanent chief constable, a process that they had delayed while merger was likely.

In 2008, the force changed uniforms to black combat style trousers with a polo shirt but reverted to the more traditional white shirt and tie on a trial basis in November 2012. It has since reverted to the polo shirt.

In 2018, Norfolk abolished its use of PCSOs and made all of its remaining PCSOs redundant. It became the first police force in England to do this. The loss of 150 PCSOs allowed Norfolk Police to recruit 97 new staff, including 81 police officers. A 5.5% rise in the police precept of council tax led to a further 17 police officers and six staff being hired.

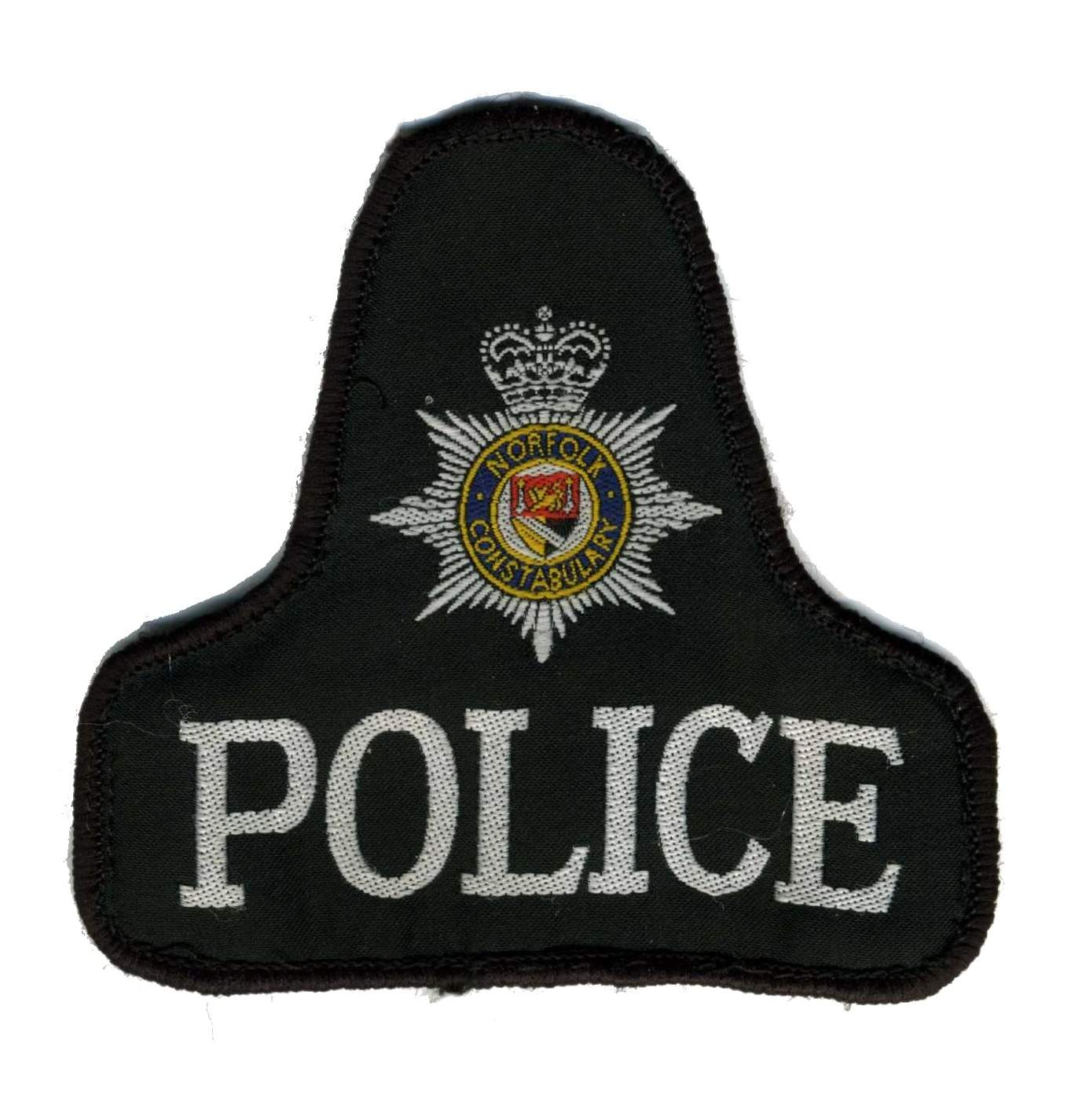
Norfolk Constabulary Patch

In 2019 the Prime Minister announced that 20,000 new police officers would be recruited as part of a national uplift programme. Norfolk had been allocated 224 of those new officers.

2020/2021 saw almost half of all new police officer recruits being female. Since the Government uplift programme began, Norfolk had recruited 211 additional officers as of May 2022, bringing the force strength up to 1,888 police officers.

In 2022, Norfolk begun training recruits under the new Police Education Qualifications Framework (PEQF) from its new training centre at Hethersett Old Hall, which sees a partnership of training with Anglia Ruskin University.

=== Chief constables ===
- 1840-n.d. Colonel Richard Montague Oakes
- n.d - 1880: Colonel George Black
- 1880-1909 Sir Paynton Pigott
- 1909–1915 Major Egbert Napier
- 1915–1928 Captain J.H. Mander
- 1928–1956 Captain Stephen Hugh Van Neck
- 1956–1975 (Frederick) Peter Collison Garland
- 1975-1980 Gordon Taylor
- 1981–1990 George Charlton
- 1990–1993 Peter Ryan
- 1993–2002 Ken Williams
- 2002–2005 Andy Hayman
- 2005–2006 Carole Howlett (acting)
- 2006–2009 Ian McPherson
- 2010–2013 Phil Gormley
- 2013–2021 Simon Bailey
- 2021–present : Paul Sanford

=== Officers killed in the line of duty ===
The Police Roll of Honour Trust and Police Memorial Trust list and commemorate all British police officers killed in the line of duty. Since its establishment in 1984, the Police Memorial Trust has erected 50 memorials nationally to some of those officers.

The following officers of Norfolk Constabulary are just two of those from the force that have been killed in the line of duty:

- PC Charles William Alger, 1909 (shot)
- PC Robert Craig Orr McLaren, 1981 (his vehicle crashed during a police pursuit)

== Organisation ==
Norfolk Constabulary is responsible for policing Norfolk's four major settlements, the City of Norwich, King's Lynn, Great Yarmouth and Thetford, along with the Brecklands, the Broadlands and North Norfolk.

It is also responsible for Norfolk's 90 miles (140 km) of coastline, along with 16 rivers, including 120 miles (190 km) of navigable waters in the Broads. It achieves this through Broads Beat, the UK's only inland waterways police, which is partly funded by public sponsorship.

There are 1,457 police constables (PC's) in Norfolk (with the remainder being officers of the rank sergeant and above). This accounts for 159 police constables per 100,000 population. 219 officers are assigned to neighbourhood policing whilst 704 are assigned to incident/response management.

Norfolk Constabulary has a responsibility for policing and security (through its own Royalty Protection Unit) of the Sandringham Estate, one of only two personal/private residences owned directly by The Royal Family.

Created in 2010, the Eastern Region Special Operations Unit (ERSOU) is funded by the seven police forces that make up the eastern region, with Bedfordshire Police being the lead force. It is primarily responsible for the combined Regional Organised Crime Unit and Counter Terrorism Policing.

== Collaboration ==
=== Norfolk & Suffolk collaboration ===
Norfolk Constabulary and Suffolk Constabulary, the force bordering to the south, have collaborated numerous services together since 2010. An extensive programme of collaborative work has already delivered a number of joint units and departments in areas such as Major Investigations, Protective Services, Custody, Transport, HR, Finance and ICT. In 2018, then-chief constable Simon Bailey stated that around £16 million had been saved by pooling resources with Suffolk.

=== 7 Force / Eastern Region collaboration ===
The 7 Force Collaboration Programme includes Bedfordshire, Cambridgeshire, Hertfordshire, Norfolk, Suffolk, Essex and Kent police forces. This strategic collaboration programme was established in 2015 to develop and implement successful collaborative solutions to protect the frontline local delivery of policing. It collaborates on areas including Procurement, Training, Firearms, Driver Management, Digital Assets, Vetting and Forensics, along with ERSOU.

=== Norfolk Fire & Rescue Service collaboration ===
2015 and 2016 respectively saw the relocation of the fire and rescue analysts team and senior management team to Norfolk Constabulary's Operations and Communications Centre (OCC) in Wymondham. This was followed in 2019, with emergency operators from Norfolk Fire and Rescue Service being co-located within the Contact & Control Room (CCR) at OCC.

== Governance and budget ==
Since 2026, the force has been overseen by Colin Sutton (Reform UK) who is the Norfolk Police and Crime Commissioner. Since 2021, the Chief Constable has been Paul Sanford.

Norfolk Constabulary's Budget (real terms) for 2023/2024 is £204 million, with £111 million being funded by the government and £93 million from precept (council tax).

== See also ==
- Norfolk Police and Crime Commissioner
- Law enforcement in the United Kingdom
- Table of police forces in the United Kingdom

== Bibliography ==
- Brian David Butcher (1989) A Movable Rambling Police: An Official History of Policing in Norfolk published by the Norfolk Constabulary
