= Giles Orpen-Smellie =

British police and crime commissioner

Norfolk Police and Crime Commissioner
- In office May 2021 – May 2024
- Preceded by: Lorne Green
- Succeeded by: Sarah Taylor

Personal details
- Party: Conservative

Giles Orpen-Smellie is a British Conservative Party politician, and the former Norfolk Police and Crime Commissioner having held the position from May 2021 until May 2024.

Orpen-Smellie was in the Parachute Regiment for 34 years and has since worked in the charity sector, where he is a trustee of Embrace CVOC.

Orpen-Smellie rose to the rank of Colonel and fought in the Falklands War, where he was an intelligence officer with 3rd Battalion, The Parachute Regiment.

Orpen-Smellie is a published author.

== Publications ==
- Tactical Intelligence in the Falklands Campaign. Stroud: Amberley Publishing, 2022. ISBN 9781398111745
