= Levi Bellfield =

British serial killer (born 1968)

- Born: Levi Rabbetts; 17 May 1968 (age 58); Isleworth, Greater London, England
- Other names: Yusuf Rahim; The Bus Stop Stalker; The Bus Stop Killer; The Hammer Man
- Occupations: Nightclub bouncer Business owner
- Known for: Murders of: Milly Dowler; Marsha McDonnell; Amélie Delagrange
- Height: 6 ft (183 cm)
- Status: Imprisoned
- Criminal charges: Burglary, assault, theft, abduction, attempted murder, murder
- Penalty: Life imprisonment (2 whole life orders)

Details
- Victims: 3+
- Span of crimes: 21 March 2002 – 19 August 2004
- Date apprehended: 22 November 2004
- Imprisoned at: HM Prison Frankland

Levi Bellfield (né Rabbetts; born 17 May 1968) is a British serial killer and sex offender. He was found guilty on 25 February 2008 of the murders of Marsha McDonnell in 2003 and Amélie Delagrange in 2004, and the attempted murder of Kate Sheedy in 2004, and sentenced to life imprisonment. On 23 June 2011, Bellfield was further found guilty of the murder of Milly Dowler in 2002.

In both cases, the judges imposed a whole life order, meaning that Bellfield will serve the sentence without the possibility of parole. He is the first prisoner to receive two whole life orders.

== Biography ==
Bellfield was born Levi Rabbetts on 17 May 1968 at the West Middlesex Hospital, Isleworth, Greater London, to Jean Rabbetts and Joseph Bellfield; he is of Romani descent. When Bellfield was 10 years old, his father died of leukaemia. Bellfield and his siblings, two brothers and two sisters, were brought up on a Southwest London council estate. He attended Forge Lane Junior School, Rectory Secondary School then Feltham Comprehensive.

Bellfield fathered 11 children with five different women, the three youngest with his most recent girlfriend, Emma Mills. In May 2022, the Ministry of Justice confirmed that Bellfield was engaged and had applied to marry while in prison. He proposed to a woman who had started writing to him two years previously, before becoming a visitor on a regular basis. Bellfield would need the permission of the governor at HM Prison Frankland. In June 2023, it was announced that Bellfield had converted to Islam and taken the name Yusuf Rahim.

== Criminal history ==
Bellfield's first conviction was as a child for burglary in 1981. He was convicted of assaulting a police officer in 1990. He also has convictions for theft and driving offences. By 2002, Bellfield had nine convictions and had spent almost a year in prison for them. In an interview with the media, Detective Chief Inspector Colin Sutton of the Metropolitan Police, who led the murder investigation, said of Bellfield: "When we started dealing with him he came across as very jokey, like he's your best mate. But he's a cunning individual, violent. He can switch from being nice to being nasty, instantly."

Bellfield searched for victims on streets he knew well. Detectives tracked down some of his ex-girlfriends, who all described a similar pattern of behaviour when they got involved with him. "He was lovely at first, charming, then completely controlling and evil. They all said the same," said Detective Sergeant Jo Brunt. At the time of the attacks, Bellfield ran a wheel-clamping business which operated in and around West Drayton, where he lived. Sutton speculated:

[Bellfield] has a massive ego to feed, he thinks he's God's gift to everyone. He drives around in his car, feels a bit 'whatever' and sees some young blonde girl. Young blonde girl says 'go away' and he thinks 'you dare to turn down Levi Bellfield, you're worth nothing' and then she gets a whack over the head. It is shown in the case of Kate Sheedy. She was smart enough to think she didn't like the look of his car and crosses the road. He thinks 'You think you're so clever' and whoosh, he runs her over.

Bellfield was seen driving around in his van, talking to young girls at bus stops, while under police surveillance. Amélie Delagrange was seen by CCTV cameras which showed her walking towards Twickenham Green after she missed her stop on the bus home. She may have stopped and spoken to Bellfield between the last two sightings of her. She was attacked shortly afterwards.

Bellfield was arrested early on the morning of 22 November 2004, on suspicion of the murder of Delagrange. On 25 November, he was charged with three counts of rape in Surrey and West London. On 9 December 2004, he was charged with assaulting a woman in Twickenham between 1995 and 1997 and remanded in custody. Bellfield was rearrested and charged with Delagrange's murder on 2 March 2006, along with the attempted murder of Kate Sheedy and the attempted murder and causing grievous bodily harm to Irma Dragoshi. On 25 May 2006, Bellfield was charged with the murder of Marsha McDonnell.

== Victims ==
=== Milly Dowler ===
Amanda Jane "Milly" Dowler was a 13-year-old girl who went missing on leaving Walton-on-Thames railway station on 21 March 2002 and was found dead in Yateley Heath Woods, Yateley, six months later. In August 2009, Surrey Police submitted a dossier to the Crown Prosecution Service (CPS) containing evidence of Bellfield's involvement in the murder of Dowler. On 30 March 2010, Bellfield was charged with the kidnapping and murder of Dowler, as well as the attempted kidnapping of the 12-year-old girl Rachel Cowles on 20 March 2002. Bellfield did not give evidence at his trial and denied any involvement in Dowler's death. On 23 June 2011 a jury convicted him of Dowler's murder.

=== Marsha McDonnell ===
Marsha Louise McDonnell, a 19-year-old woman, was beaten over the head with a blunt instrument near her home in Hampton on 4 February 2003. The wound was inflicted shortly after she got off the 111 bus from Kingston upon Thames at the stop on Percy Road. She died in hospital two days after being admitted. Bellfield sold his Vauxhall Corsa car for £1,500 six days after the murder, having bought it for £6,000 just five months earlier.

=== Kate Sheedy ===
Kate Sheedy, then aged 18, was deliberately run over as she crossed the road near an entrance to an industrial estate in Isleworth on 28 May 2004; her mother called an ambulance and she survived with multiple injuries and spent several weeks in hospital. Nearly four years later, Sheedy gave evidence against Bellfield when he was tried for her attempted murder. Sheedy had described the car after the attack as a white people carrier with blacked-out windows and a broken wing mirror; Bellfield was found to have owned a Toyota Previa matching that description at the time of the attack.

=== Amélie Delagrange ===
Amélie Delagrange was a 22-year-old French student visiting England. She was found at Twickenham Green on the evening of 19 August 2004, with serious head injuries, and died in hospital the same night. Within 24 hours, the police established that she might have been killed by the same person who had killed Marsha McDonnell 18 months earlier. Bellfield reportedly confessed to the murder while on remand.

=== Charges of abduction and attempted murder ===
Bellfield was also charged with the abduction and false imprisonment of Anna-Maria Rennie, then aged 17, in Whitton on 14 October 2001. Rennie identified him in a video identity parade four years later. He was also charged with the attempted murder of Irma Dragoshi, then aged 39, in Longford on 16 December 2003. The jury failed to reach verdicts on either of these charges.

=== Additional alleged victims ===
==== Patsy Morris ====
On 16 June 1980, Patricia "Patsy" Joyce Morris, a 14-year old schoolgirl from Feltham, London, was murdered by strangulation. She disappeared on the day of her death, having been seen leaving her school during her lunch break. It was believed Morris left school because she had forgotten her raincoat that morning, returning home to change into dry clothes.

Two days later, on the evening of 18 June, Morris's body was found by a police dog handler on Hounslow Heath. She was discovered face down, fully clothed, in a copse beside a path on the edge of the Heath, a quarter of a mile from her home in Cygnet Avenue. She had been strangled with a ligature and there were no signs of sexual assault.

In February 2008, police revealed they were investigating a possible confession to the murder made by Bellfield. He was said to have been obsessed with the murder when it occurred and remained 'fascinated' by the unsolved killing. Bellfield was alleged to have made the confession to a cellmate while on remand. It was then revealed that Bellfield had attended Feltham Comprehensive with Morris and that he was her childhood boyfriend. Morris's family told the press that they had not known they had known each other, and her sister stated: "We did not know him. It was a shock when we found out they knew each other. Friends told us about it. It is horrendous."

Bellfield would have been 12 at the time of Morris's murder, which occurred a year before he received his first conviction, for burglary, aged 13. As a pupil he was known to have repeatedly played truant and was known to often frequent Hounslow Heath when he should have been at school. He was also known to have not attended school the day of the murder. Former partners of Bellfield recounted that he had a hatred of blond women and targeted them for attacks, and it was noted that Morris was blonde. Some claimed that Morris's death could have been the start of Bellfield's violent obsession with blondes.

After it was revealed that Bellfield was being investigated by police for the murder of Morris, her father George stated that he was certain that the teenage boy who had given him a death threat in a call at the time was Bellfield, saying: "He's a local man, which is why it could be him. And it's terrifying to think that someone of 12 or 13 could have done it".

==== Judith Gold ====
After Bellfield's 2008 conviction, police revealed they were reviewing the murder of 51-year-old Judith Gold in Hampstead in October 1990. Described as an "attractive and vivacious" middle-class housewife, she had died yards from her home after being hit several times in the face by an unidentified weapon. Police believed Bellfield could have been responsible for this alongside around 20 other unsolved attacks on women in London. These attacks, which took place between 1990 and around 2004, were all linked to Bellfield because the police researched the frequency of blunt-force trauma attacks on women and children using objects such as hammers; they found that these were so rare that only one unsolved attack in Greater London in that time period could realistically be ruled out as being the work of Bellfield.

The circumstances of Gold's murder were somewhat mysterious: police were unsure why she had dressed as if for a business meeting just before she left her home at around 5:30 a.m. on the day she was killed, 20 October 1990. She left her home above the Midland Bank in Hampstead High Street and was found battered only yards away by a paperboy in Old Brewery Mews, while it was still pitch black. The place she was found was very dark due to recent problems with street lighting. Unusually, no witnesses reported hearing any screams, struggle or anything else suspicious, and her housemates reported having not heard her get up and leave for unexplained reasons in the middle of the night. Her husband had died two years previously and she lived with her 19-year-old daughter and a family friend.

Gold worked as an insurance and mortgage agent and also as a freelance financier, and was also known as Judith Silver. There was no sign of sexual assault and the motive also appeared not to be robbery as her handbag and jewellery were left untouched, although her very distinctive chain which she wore round her neck had been taken.

In February 1991, The Guardian had reported that the murder was believed to be linked to an "international financial swindle". Scotland Yard detectives said at the time that they were investigating fraudulent loan schemes in which Gold may have been involved, and it was found that she was involved in an "international advanced-fee fraud". Gold did not usually wake up early and her job did not involve working on Saturdays, so investigators theorised that she had arranged a meeting with someone and knew the killer. Her work was described as "shadowy" and involved negotiating large low-interest loans with businesspeople, which her daughter disliked her doing and which she said made her mother visibly stressed in the days before she died.

The lead detective on the case said in 1994: "We're sure she got in too deep and that's what led to her death." It was found that Gold had written the number of the local police station on the back of her chequebook. The day before her murder, Gold had mysteriously left the house and her daughter noticed that her car had been reversed into its parking space when she returned, something she never did, raising the possibility she had gone to meet someone then and that person had driven her car back home. In February 2022, it was reported that Bellfield confessed to the murder of Gold.

==== Russell murders ====
Regarding the 1996 murders of 45-year-old Lin Russell and her six-year-old daughter Megan Russell, BBC Cymru Wales reported that Bellfield had allegedly confessed to the murders to a fellow prisoner, giving details that "would only be known by the killer". Bellfield denied the confession. A 2017 BBC Two programme, The Chillenden Murders, in which a team of independent experts re-examined the evidence, supported the idea Bellfield should be investigated for the killings. The legal team of Michael Stone, convicted of the crimes, maintains Bellfield is the true perpetrator of the attack.

In December 2017, The Sunday Times reported that Bellfield's ex-wife Johanna Collings had told investigators in the Delagrange case that he was with her on the day of her 25th birthday, the time of the Russell murders, and had spent all day in Twickenham and Windsor, 100 miles away from the scene of the murders which occurred at around 4.30 p.m. It was an alibi which detectives found credible. Collings had helped detectives convict Bellfield for his previous murders, such as in the Milly Dowler murder, giving evidence that he knew well the rural area where her body was left. In regards to the Russell murders, however, she clarified in a BBC documentary in 2017, although she was wrong about the date being a weekend:

My daughter was born in '96 and that was the day of my birthday. He [Bellfield] never left my side, all day and all night, so there's absolutely no way he could have got from Twickenham, where I lived, or Windsor, where I kept my horses, to Kent, done what they say he did, and got back without me not knowing he was there. I can hand on my heart, I hate to say it, but I can say hand on my heart he didn't do it.

In February 2022, it was claimed by Stone's lawyer, Paul Bacon, that Bellfield had confessed to the murders of Lin and Megan Russell in a four-page statement with details he claimed only the killer would know. However, as well as his former wife previously saying it was not possible that he could have been in Kent on the day, a member of Stone's legal team also later admitted that there was nothing in Bellfield's statement which was not already in the public domain, suggesting he could have fabricated it using known evidence. The detective responsible for investigating Bellfield's known crimes, Colin Sutton, also stated to the press: "Knowing Bellfield as I do, this could be him playing mind games". The Metropolitan Police previously investigated allegations that Bellfield was involved in the Russell murders and found no evidence to support the claims.

In 2023, Bellfield's lawyer claimed that Bellfield had admitted to the murders during a conversation with a prison psychologist. Stone's lawyer declared that a signed confession by Bellfield had been handed over to the CCRC. In July 2023, the CCRC announced that the case would not be referred to the Court of Appeal. However, this decision was overturned three months later and the CCRC began a review of Stone's conviction based on the new evidence.

==== Elizabeth Chau ====
In October 2022, police were made aware that Bellfield had confessed to the abduction, rape and murder of 19-year-old Elizabeth Chau, who disappeared in 1999, and to the attempted murders of five other women. Chau went missing in West London on 16 April 1999, when she left her home in West Ealing at noon to attend Thames Valley University. She was last seen by a friend on Ealing Broadway at 5.50 p.m. that day. The confession was not made public until April 2023, and Bellfield was not interviewed over the murder until the following month when he claimed in a recorded interview that he had abducted and killed Chau and pointed to the location of the body on a map. The family of Chau accused the Metropolitan Police of not taking the case seriously because of their race.

After several months of investigation, the Metropolitan Police announced in November 2023 that they had concluded Bellfield was not responsible for Chau's disappearance. Bellfield had claimed to have lain in wait for her in his car near Ealing police station, but CCTV footage from the night of Chau's disappearance did not show him or his car. As a result, police decided not to dig up the site where Bellfield said he had buried Chau.

==== Sarah Spurrell ====
In January 2004, 23-year-old Sarah Spurrell was struck three times with a hammer in a dark street in the East Sussex town of Hastings. Spurrell survived the attack due to the intervention of a bystander and later informed the police, but was allegedly told that they lacked the resources to investigate the assault. Spurrell later said that she felt police considered her case an "utter joke". In March 2023 Bellfield, who was named as a suspect in the case in 2008, reportedly confessed to the attack on Spurrell and several other attempted murders and assaults. Spurrell was not made aware of Bellfield's confession until she was informed by journalists working for ITV News, for which she criticised the police.

==== Further developments ====
Police were informed in early 2015 that Bellfield, in his cell at HM Prison Wakefield, had admitted to unsolved rape and murder cases. The Metropolitan Police co-ordinated the subsequent investigations of ten police forces. On 9 November 2016, they issued a statement which said: "All lines of inquiry have now been exhausted and the decision has been taken to close this investigation as there is no evidence to link the individual to any case for which he has not already been convicted." It was later revealed by police that Bellfield may have lied about other murders so he could inflict pain on the victims' families.

== Conviction and imprisonment ==
Bellfield was found guilty of the murders of McDonnell and Delagrange, as well as the attempted murder of Sheedy, on 25 February 2008, more than three years after the last of the three attacks. The following day, he was sentenced to life imprisonment with a whole life order. Bellfield was not in court to hear his sentence as he had refused to attend court owing to what he said was "unfair press coverage" following his conviction.

On 30 March 2010, Bellfield was charged with Dowler's abduction and murder, pre-dating the earliest of the other three charges by almost a year. He was named as the prime suspect in connection with the murder in the immediate aftermath of his first trial in 2008. As a result, the inquest into Dowler's death was adjourned. On 6 October 2010, he appeared in court via video link and was formally charged with one count each of attempted abduction, actual abduction and murder.

Bellfield's second trial began at the Old Bailey on 10 May 2011, and on 23 June the jury found him guilty. He was again sentenced to life imprisonment the following day and the trial judge once again imposed a whole life order. The trial of Bellfield on another charge, that of the attempted abduction of an 11-year-old girl who was offered a lift in the Walton area by a man in a red car on the day preceding this murder, was abandoned due to newspapers publishing prejudicial material.

On 27 January 2016, Surrey Police announced that Bellfield had admitted, for the first time, abducting, raping and murdering Dowler after being interviewed about whether he had an accomplice. Bellfield later issued a denial that he made any such confession, but Surrey Police stood by its earlier statement. As of 2020, Bellfield was imprisoned in HM Prison Frankland in County Durham.

== Media ==
The investigation that led to Bellfield's arrest was dramatised by ITV in a three-part television series that premiered in early-2019; Manhunt was adapted from the memoir of Colin Sutton, with actor Martin Clunes playing Sutton. The third episode of the eight-part series Making a Monster, commissioned by the Crime & Investigation channel, focuses on Bellfield's character and motivations. The Real Manhunter aired on Sky Crime in 2021 with the second episode exploring the Bellfield investigation. Colin Sutton and his original team of Metropolitan Police detectives described everything from the moment Bellfield was identified through to his arrest, trial and conviction.

== See also ==
- List of serial killers in the United Kingdom
- Murders of Eve Stratford and Lynne Weedon
- David Smith – contemporary killer of women who also operated from south-west London
- Murder of Alison Shaughnessy – when some of the charges against Bellfield were forced to be dropped in 2011 due to prejudicial reporting, it was compared to the Shaughnessy case
- Colin Campbell – infamous 1980s killer and abductor of women in west London
- List of prisoners with whole-life orders
