= Murder of Milly Dowler =

2002 murder of English schoolgirl

- Photograph of Dowler
- Location: Walton-on-Thames, Surrey, England
- Date: 21–22 March 2002
- Attack type: Kidnapping and murder (strangulation)
- Perpetrator: Levi Bellfield
- Sentence: Life imprisonment (whole life order)
- Judge: Alan Wilkie

On 21 March 2002, 13-year-old Milly Dowler went missing from Walton-on-Thames in Surrey, England. She was last seen walking home from school along Station Avenue. Following an extensive search, her remains were discovered in Yateley Heath Woods in Hampshire, on 18 September.

On 23 June 2011, Levi Bellfield, already subject to three life sentences with a whole life tariff imposed for the murders of Marsha McDonnell and Amélie Delagrange and the attempted murder of Kate Sheedy, all of which had taken place after Dowler's murder, was found guilty of abducting and murdering Dowler. He received another whole-life sentence. On 27 January 2016, Surrey Police announced that Bellfield had admitted to abducting, raping and murdering Dowler.

Dowler's parents established a charity called Milly's Fund to "promote public safety, and in particular the safety of children and young people." The case generated debate over the treatment of victims and witnesses in court after Dowler's family criticised the way they were cross-examined during Bellfield's trial.

Dowler's murder played a significant role in the News International phone hacking scandal. In 2011, reports revealed how journalists at the News of the World newspaper had accessed Dowler's voicemail after she was reported missing, giving her parents false hope she was still alive. The resulting outcry from the British public contributed to the closure of the newspaper and led to a range of investigations and inquiries into phone hacking and media ethics in British media.

== Disappearance ==
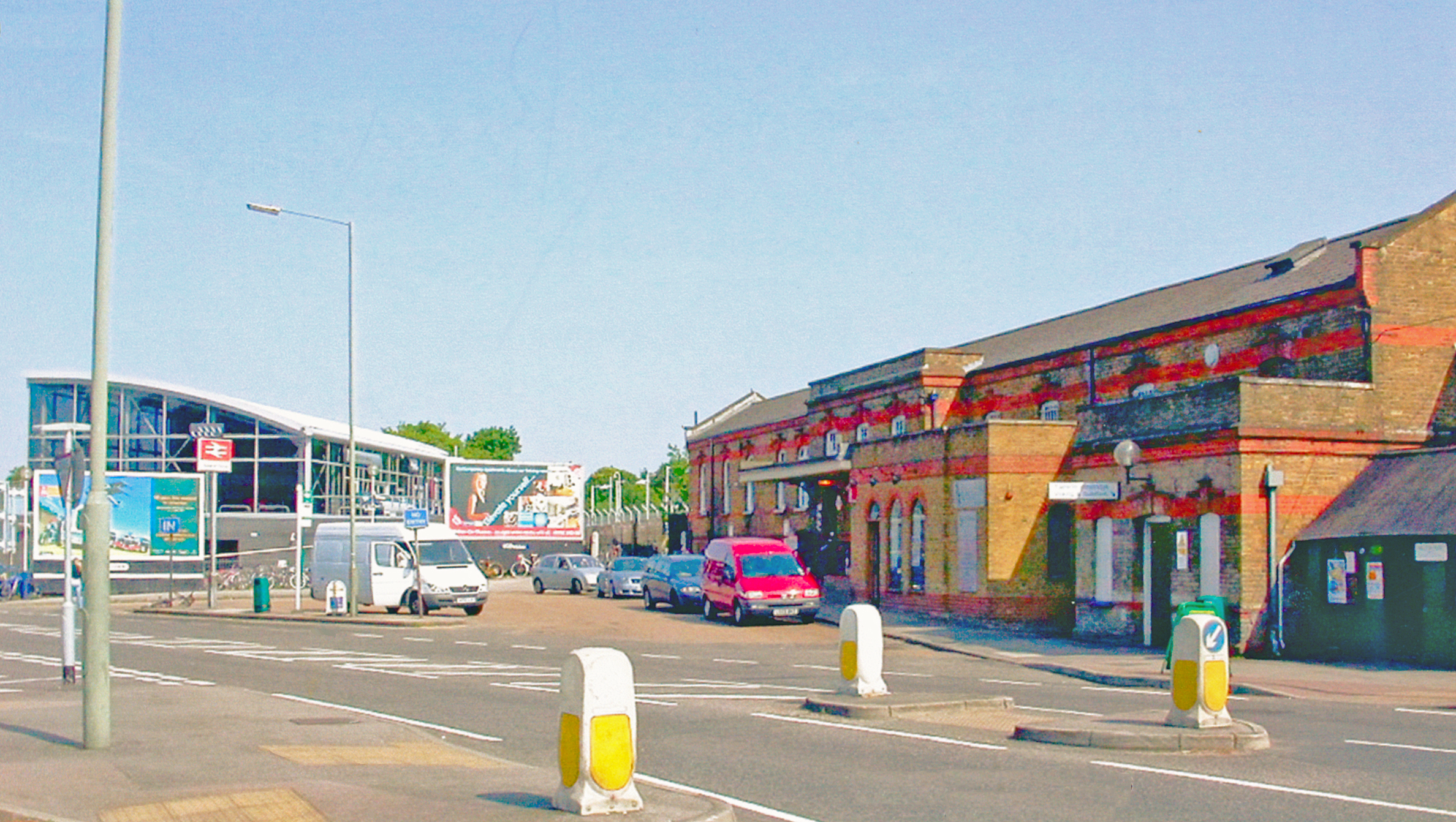
Dowler was last seen walking along Station Avenue by Walton-on-Thames railway station.

At 3:07 p.m. on 21 March 2002, 13-year-old Amanda Jane "Milly" Dowler left Heathside School in Weybridge, Surrey, and walked to Weybridge railway station with a friend. The girls travelled to Walton-on-Thames railway station, one stop before Dowler's usual stop of Hersham, and went to the station café. After Dowler telephoned her father at 3:47 p.m. to say she would be home in half an hour, the girls left the café at 4:05 p.m., with Dowler walking home alone. She was last seen three minutes later walking along Station Avenue, by a friend of her sister who was waiting at a bus stop.

A closed-circuit television camera located further along the road showed no images of Dowler. A red Daewoo Nexia, which belonged to Levi Bellfield's girlfriend Emma Mills, was photographed driving past by the same camera at 4:32 p.m. In an April 2009 interview, Bellfield said that he was driving this car.

When Dowler failed to return home, she was reported missing to the police at 7:00 p.m. A nationwide search for her followed, with 100 police officers and helicopters searching fields, streets and rivers around Hersham. Detectives who had investigated the abduction of Sarah Payne were called in to help. Police and the Dowler family made many appeals for information, including a reconstruction on the BBC's Crimewatch UK. A plea was also made by Pop Idol winner Will Young, whose concert Dowler had attended shortly before her disappearance.

The Crimewatch UK appeal included a direct appeal to Dowler, suggesting that she may have run away from home rather than fallen into the hands of an abductor or murderer. Her mother expressed hope that her daughter had run away, but said that she could not think of a reason why she would want to do so. The Independent reported in 2011 that Dowler had, some time previously, written a mock leaving-home letter and notes showing she had been unhappy.

A week after Dowler's disappearance, the police stated that she was probably not taken by force. They reasoned that while she was unlikely to have gone off with someone she did not know of her own free will, no-one had come forward who had witnessed a struggle despite a number of apparent sightings of her prior to her disappearance. This suggested the possibility that she had willingly entered the home or vehicle of someone she knew.

On 23 April 2002, the discovery of a body in the River Thames prompted media speculation that the body might be that of Dowler, but the body was identified the following day as that of 73-year-old Maisie Thomas, who went missing in March 2001 and whose death was not believed to be suspicious. In June 2002, despite further searches, the offer of a £100,000 reward by national tabloid newspaper The Sun and her parents continuing to send text messages to her mobile telephone in hope of a reply, Dowler remained missing. That month, police told her parents that she was probably dead.

== Body discovery and murder investigation ==
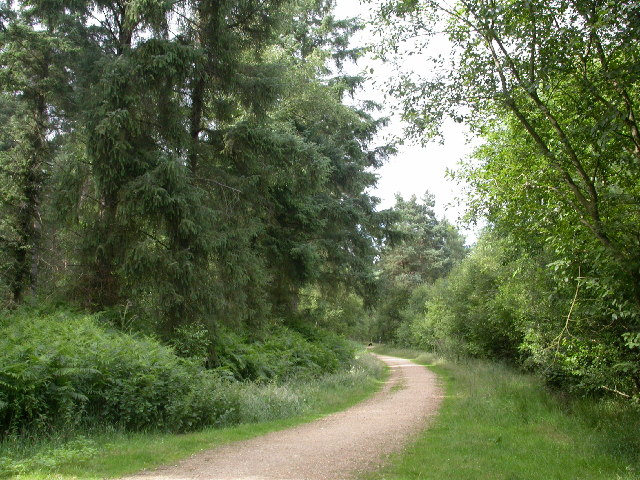
Dowler's remains were located in Yateley Heath Woods near Yateley, Hampshire.

On 18 September 2002, human remains were discovered by mushroom pickers in Yateley Heath Woods near Yateley, Hampshire. They were later confirmed through dental records as Dowler's. Due to the severity of the decomposition, the cause of death could not be ascertained. No items of Dowler's clothing or possessions—the purse, rucksack, or mobile phone—she had with her at the time of her disappearance have ever been recovered. The discovery of the body led the police to reclassify the case as a homicide investigation. Undertaken by Surrey Police, the investigation was code-named Operation Ruby.

On 22 November 2002, police set up a road block near the spot where the body was found. Some 6,000 motorists in the area were questioned, but no leads were discovered. Surrey Police initially considered Dowler's father a suspect, but later apologised for the missed opportunities their attention to this track may have caused. On 23 March 2003, DNA of an unidentified male was discovered on an item of Dowler's clothing in her bedroom, suggesting that her killer may have met her before. This link was ruled out within three months, around the same time that a DNA link to a church robbery in Sunderland was also ruled out.

Paul Hughes was convicted of making death threats and was jailed for five years after sending letters to Dowler's sister threatening to kill her and claiming to have killed Dowler. Hughes sent the letters while imprisoned for indecently assaulting a 12-year-old girl; the prison service apologised for not screening mail effectively. Leanne Newman, of Tewkesbury, Gloucestershire, repeatedly phoned Dowler's parents, school and the police, pretending to be Dowler. Newman was jailed in April 2003 for five months after pleading guilty to five counts of making phone calls to cause annoyance, inconvenience, or needless anxiety. Gary Farr, of Retford, Nottinghamshire, repeatedly e-mailed Dowler's parents, friends, and police officers working on the case, claiming that she was still alive and had been smuggled out of the country to work as a prostitute and stripper at nightclubs in Poland, and that her alleged death had been a cover-up. Farr was sectioned indefinitely under the Mental Health Act on 19 October 2006 for being a serious psychological danger to the public after admitting a charge of harassment.

In March 2008, an unnamed man was arrested over the disposal of a car linked to the murder investigation, but was released later that same day. In October 2009, Bedfont Lakes Country Park in West London was searched by police in the hope of finding the red Daewoo Nexia, but they recovered neither the car nor anything else of interest to their inquiry. The car remains unfound.

On 25 February 2008, Surrey Police confirmed that Levi Bellfield was their prime suspect in the murder inquiry and that they were "very interested" in questioning him, following his conviction of the murders of two young female students and the attempted murder of a third. On 30 March 2010, Bellfield was charged with Dowler's abduction and murder. As a result, the inquest into her death was adjourned. On 6 October 2010, Bellfield appeared in court via video link, as he was already serving three life sentences for murder and attempted murder, and was formally charged in relation to the Dowler case.

== Trial of Bellfield ==
Bellfield's trial began on 10 May 2011 at the Central Criminal Court before Mr Justice Wilkie and concluded on 23 June 2011; the jury found him guilty. He was sentenced to life imprisonment the following day, and the trial judge recommended a whole life tariff in line with his previous murder convictions three years earlier. The trial of Bellfield on another charge for the attempted abduction of Rachel Cowles, an 11-year-old girl known to have been offered a lift in the Walton area by a man in a red car on 20 March 2002, was abandoned due to newspapers publishing prejudicial material. The judge ordered that the charge should remain on file.

=== Post-trial ===
The murder of Dowler and the resulting investigation and trial were the subject of a special Crimewatch programme, titled Taken: The Milly Dowler Story, which was broadcast on BBC One on 30 June 2011. It featured interviews with witnesses, Dowler's family, and investigators. The programme explored how Bellfield was caught, and featured a reconstruction of how the crime was believed to have unfolded based on court transcripts.

On 27 January 2016, another arrest was made in the Dowler case, leading Bellfield to be interviewed about whether he had an accomplice. Surrey Police announced that Bellfield admitted in this interview to the abduction, rape, and murder of Dowler, and that the individual they had arrested had been released without charge. On 12 February 2016, Bellfield changed his story, denying that he had confessed to Dowler's murder.

==== Reactions to court proceedings ====
After Bellfield's sentencing, the Dowler family strongly criticised their treatment during the trial. Dowler's sister Gemma described the day that her parents were cross-examined by Bellfield's defence lawyer as "the worst day of my life". Her mother told reporters outside the Old Bailey:

For us, the trial has been a truly awful experience. We have had to hear Milly's name defamed in court; she has been portrayed as an unhappy, depressed young girl... the Milly we knew was a happy, vivacious, fun-loving girl. Our family life has been scrutinised and laid open for everyone to inspect. We've had to lose our right to privacy and sit through day after harrowing day of the trial in order to get a man convicted of this brutal murder. The lengths the system goes to protect his human rights seems so unfair compared to what we as a family have had to endure.

Dowler's father, Bob, commented on Bellfield's refusal to give evidence in court, and to appear for sentencing. He added:

My family's had to pay too high a price for this conviction. The trial has been a truly mentally-scarring experience on an unimaginable scale; you had to have been there to truly understand. During our questioning, my wife and I both felt as if we were on trial; we despair of a justice system that is so loaded in favour of the perpetrator of the crime.

The then-Chief Constable of Surrey Police Mark Rowley, who oversaw the investigation, joined the Director of Public Prosecutions in calling for changes and for greater protection of victims and witnesses during court cases. Rowley said it was a "most bizarre and distressing coincidence" that the Dowler family had their privacy "destroyed" at a time when footballers and celebrities were being granted super-injunctions to protect details of their personal lives.

The then-Justice Secretary Kenneth Clarke rejected calls for a review of criminal cases. Clarke said that, while Bellfield had been convicted of previous murders, he had to be presumed innocent in the Dowler case and found guilty by a jury in a full court process. To avoid prejudicing the trial, the court did not allow evidence to be introduced of Bellfield's "obsession" with schoolgirls and his attempts to procure sex from them.

== Voicemail tampering investigation ==
The Guardian reported on 4 July 2011 that Scotland Yard had discovered Dowler's voicemail had been accessed by journalists working for the News of the World and the newspaper's private investigator Glenn Mulcaire. The Guardian also reported that, during the police investigation into that newspaper's phone hacking activities, detectives discovered that journalists had deleted some messages—potential evidence—in Dowler's voicemail box because it was full, in order to free up space for new messages, to which they could listen. The deletions after Dowler was missing led family and friends to think that she was still alive. It was later reported that Dowler's phone automatically deleted messages 72 hours after they were listened to.

Dowler's parents announced via their solicitor that they would pursue a claim for damages against the News of the World. In September 2011, it was reported that the Dowler family had been offered £2 million (equivalent to US$3.2 million at the time) in personal damages. In January 2012, it was reported that Surrey Police and other police forces knew soon after Dowler's death that News of the World staff had accessed her mobile phone messages, but did not take issue with this. Instead, a senior Surrey officer invited newspaper staff to a meeting to discuss the case.

Incidents relating to the aftermath were depicted in the 2025 ITV drama about the phone hacking scandal, The Hack.

== Legacy ==
Dowler's parents, Sally and Bob Dowler, launched a charity called Milly's Fund on the day of her memorial service in October 2002. Its mission was "to promote public safety, and in particular the safety of the children and young people". The charity provides risk assessment advice to teenagers, youth workers, and educators. Its work includes the "Teach UR Mum 2 TXT" campaign, which encourages children and parents to stay in contact via text messaging, including a glossary for parents of commonly-used SMS abbreviations.

The campaign was awarded "Best Use of Mobile for Accessibility" at the 2004 GSM Association Awards. Milly's Fund commissioned a five-part soap opera titled Watch Over Me (2003), which encourages personal safety for teenagers, to be distributed to every school in the UK.

At the 2005 Hampton Court Palace Flower Show, a garden designed in memory of Dowler by Penny Smith won the Tudor Rose award, the show's highest honour. The garden was designed in the style of a 1950s police house garden with flowers and vegetables, and was constructed with the assistance of students from the Merrist Wood campus of Guildford College.

In 2005, the family announced that Milly's Fund would be transferred to the Suzy Lamplugh Trust and was wound up that year.

A magenta sweet pea was named after Dowler and made publicly available by Matthewman's Sweetpeas.

The investigation that led to Bellfield's arrest was dramatised in the three-part 2019 television series Manhunt, with Martin Clunes playing Colin Sutton, the detective in charge of the Delagrange investigation.

== See also ==
- List of solved missing person cases (2000s)
- Murder of Patsy Morris, unsolved 1980 murder of Bellfield's childhood girlfriend
- Murders of Eve Stratford and Lynne Weedon
